= 2001–02 Halifax Town A.F.C. season =

Halifax Town
2001–02 season
- Manager: Paul Bracewell; Tony Parks; Neil Redfearn; Alan Little
- Stadium: The Shay
- League Division 3: 24th
- FA Cup: 2nd Round
- Top goalscorer: League: Paul Harsley; All: Paul Harsley

The 2001–02 season saw Halifax Town compete in League Division 3, where they finished in 24th position.

== Statistics ==
=== Appearances and goals ===
No.	Pos	Nat	Player	Total		Division 3		F.A. Cup		League Cup		League Trophy	
No.	Pos	Nat	Player	Apps	Goals	Apps	Goals	Apps	Goals	Apps	Goals	Apps	Goals
1	GK	(England) ENG	Lee Butler	27	0	21+1	0	3+0	0	1+0	0	1+0	0
2	DF	(England) ENG	Paul Harsley	50	12	45+0	11	3+0	1	1+0	0	1+0	0
3	DF	(England) ENG	Dominic Ludden	3	0	2+0	0	1+0	0	0+0	0	0+0	0
4	DF	(England) ENG	Andy Woodward	33	1	29+1	1	2+0	0	1+0	0	0+0	0
5	DF	(England) ENG	Chris Clarke	28	0	24+0	0	3+0	0	1+0	0	0+0	0
6	DF	(England) ENG	Paul Stoneman	34	1	32+0	1	0+0	0	1+0	0	1+0	0
7	MF	(England) ENG	Craig Middleton	32	3	21+8	2	1+0	1	0+1	0	1+0	0
8	MF	(England) ENG	Neil Redfearn	35	6	27+3	6	3+0	0	1+0	0	1+0	0
9	FW	(Scotland) SCO	Steve Kerrigan	34	0	23+7	0	2+0	0	1+0	0	1+0	0
10	FW	(England) ENG	Gary Jones	40	4	20+15	4	1+2	0	0+1	0	1+0	0
11	FW	(England) ENG	Craig Midgley	28	3	12+12	3	2+0	0	1+0	0	0+1	0
12	DF	(England) ENG	Mark Jules	39	0	34+1	0	1+1	0	1+0	0	1+0	0
13	GK	(England) ENG	Barry Richardson	24	0	24+0	0	0+0	0	0+0	0	0+0	0
14	DF	(England) ENG	Steve Swales	31	1	24+4	1	1+0	0	1+0	0	0+1	0
15	DF	(England) ENG	Graham Mitchell	47	0	41+2	0	3+0	0	0+0	0	1+0	0
16	DF	(England) ENG	Matthew Clarke	35	1	22+9	1	3+0	0	0+0	0	1+0	0
17	MF	(Republic of Ireland) IRL	Alan Reilly	2	0	0+2	0	0+0	0	0+0	0	0+0	0
18	FW	(England) ENG	Ian Fitzpatrick	32	8	26+3	8	3+0	0	0+0	0	0+0	0
20	FW	(England) ENG	Steve Oleksewycz	2	0	0+2	0	0+0	0	0+0	0	0+0	0
21	MF	(England) ENG	Robert Herbert	14	0	11+1	0	0+2	0	0+0	0	0+0	0
21	FW	(England) ENG	Jamie Wood	19	1	10+6	0	1+0	1	1+0	0	0+1	0
22	GK	(England) ENG	Peter Crookes	1	0	1+0	0	0+0	0	0+0	0	0+0	0
23	MF	(England) ENG	Peter Wright	17	0	3+11	0	0+2	0	0+1	0	0+0	0
24	MF	(England) ENG	Craig Smith	2	0	0+2	0	0+0	0	0+0	0	0+0	0
25	DF	(England) ENG	Nicky Heinemann	3	0	3+0	0	0+0	0	0+0	0	0+0	0
25	MF	(England) ENG	Scott Houghton	7	0	7+0	0	0+0	0	0+0	0	0+0	0
25	MF	(Scotland) SCO	Grant Smith	12	0	11+0	0	0+0	0	0+0	0	1+0	0
26	DF	(England) ENG	Nathan Winder	1	0	0+1	0	0+0	0	0+0	0	0+0	0
27	MF	(England) ENG	Steve Bushell	25	1	25+0	1	0+0	0	0+0	0	0+0	0
28	FW	(England) ENG	Marc Richards	5	0	5+0	0	0+0	0	0+0	0	0+0	0
29	FW	(England) ENG	Andy Farrell	9	0	7+2	0	0+0	0	0+0	0	0+0	0

== Competitions ==
=== League Division 3 ===
11 August 2001 1	Lincoln City	1–2	Halifax Town	Lincoln
	Thorpe 44 '	Report	Midgley 38 ' Harsley 39 ' Redfearn (yellow card) 59 ' Clarke (yellow card) 82 '	Stadium: Sincil Bank; Attendance: 3,753; Referee: Alan Butler

18 August 2001 2	Halifax Town	1–1	Exeter City	Halifax
	Swales 22 ' (yellow card) 41 ' Redfearn (yellow card) 67 '	Report	Kerr 2 ' (yellow card) 88 ' Whitworth (yellow card) 72' (yellow-red card) 90 '	Stadium: The Shay; Attendance: 1,937; Referee: Graham Salisbury

25 August 2001 3	Southend United	4–1	Halifax Town	Southend-on-Sea
	Richards 45', 90 ' Cort (yellow card) 45 ' Johnson 56 ' Webb 80 '	Report	Jules (yellow card) 25 ' Butler (yellow card) 39 ' Woodward (yellow card) 45 ' Midgley (yellow card) 45 ' Redfearn 66' (pen.) (yellow card) 86 ' Stoneman (yellow card) 79 '	Stadium: Roots Hall; Attendance: 3,525; Referee: Paul Rejer

27 August 2001 4	Halifax Town	0–2	Oxford United	Halifax
	Kerrigan (yellow card) 11 '	Report	Scott 6 ' (yellow card) 29' (yellow-red card) 45 ' Gray 12 ' (yellow card) 65 ' Bolland (yellow card) 62 '	Stadium: The Shay; Attendance: 2,271; Referee: Phil Joslin

1 September 2001 5	York City	1–0	Halifax Town	York
	Proctor 90 '	Report	Redfearn (yellow card) 52 ' C. Clarke (yellow card) 55 ' M. Clarke (yellow card) 88 '	Stadium: Bootham Crescent; Attendance: 2,646; Referee: Frazer Stretton

8 September 2001 6	Halifax Town	0–0	Macclesfield Town	Halifax
	Mitchell (yellow card) 40 ' Jules (yellow card) 49 ' Redfearn (yellow card) 77 '	Report	Keen (yellow card) 64 ' Munroe (yellow card) 80 ' Tracey (yellow card) 82 ' Hitchen (yellow card) 90 '	Stadium: The Shay; Attendance: 1,714; Referee: Roger Furnandiz

15 September 2001 7	Swansea City	0–2	Halifax Town	Swansea
	Phillips (yellow card) 36 '	Report	Harsley 25', 46 ' Clarke (yellow card) 26 '	Stadium: Vetch Field; Attendance: 3,794; Referee: Keith Hill

18 September 2001 8	Halifax Town	1–0	Mansfield Town	Halifax
	Stoneman (yellow card) 24 ' Jones 29 ' Smith (yellow card) 66 ' Harsley (yellow card) 81 '	Report		Stadium: The Shay; Attendance: 1,880; Referee: George Cain

22 September 2001 9	Halifax Town	0–0	Leyton Orient	Halifax
		Report		Stadium: The Shay; Attendance: 2,021; Referee: Brian Curson

25 September 2001 10	Rochdale	2–0	Halifax Town	Rochdale
	Griffiths (yellow card) 18 ' Platt 62', 77 '	Report	Middleton (yellow card) 63 '	Stadium: Spotland Stadium; Attendance: 3,410; Referee: Frazer Stretton

29 September 2001 11	Hull City	3–0	Halifax Town	Hull
	Dudfield 23 ' Reddy 73', 85 '	Report	Harsley (yellow card) 26 '	Stadium: Boothferry Park; Attendance: 9,572; Referee: Paul Alcock

5 October 2001 12	Halifax Town	0–0	Scunthorpe United	Halifax
	Redfearn (yellow card) 4' (yellow-red card) 57 ' Stoneman (yellow card) 61 ' Swales (yellow card) 63 ' Smith (yellow card) 82 '	Report	Carruthers (yellow card) 27 ' Kell (yellow card) 57 ' Jackson (yellow card) 79 '	Stadium: The Shay; Attendance: 2,603; Referee: Ray Olivier

13 October 2001 13	Plymouth Argyle	3–0	Halifax Town	Plymouth
	Coughlan 16 ' Phillips 23 ' Hodges 26 '	Report	Redfearn (yellow card) 55 ' Mitchell (yellow card) 77 ' Swales (yellow card) 85 '	Stadium: Home Park; Attendance: 5,065; Referee: Mark Warren

20 October 2001 14	Halifax Town	0–0	Bristol Rovers	Halifax
	Swales (yellow card) 75 ' Clarke (yellow card) 90 '	Report	Plummer (yellow card) 1 ' Bryant (yellow card) 84 '	Stadium: The Shay; Attendance: 1,898; Referee: Mike Ryan

23 October 2001 15	Halifax Town	2–4	Luton Town	Halifax
	Harsley 6 ' Fitzpatrick (yellow card) 24 ' (goal) 78 ' Kerrigan (yellow card) 45 '	Report	Crowe 31', 45 ' Nicholls 86 ' Forbes 88 ' Perrett (yellow card) 49 '	Stadium: The Shay; Attendance: 2,140; Referee: Mike Pike

27 October 2001 16	Carlisle United	0–0	Halifax Town	Carlisle
	Winstanley (yellow card) 45 ' Foran (yellow card) 48 ' Morley (yellow card) 78 '	Report	Clarke (yellow card) 73 ' Stoneman (yellow card) 75 ' Smith (yellow card) 90 '	Stadium: Brunton Park; Attendance: 3,157; Referee: Lee Cable & James Tattan

3 November 2001 17	Halifax Town	2–2	Darlington	Halifax
	Redfearn 22 ' Harsley (yellow card) 75 ' Kerrigan (yellow card) 76 ' Mitchell (yellow card) 87 ' Fitzpatrick 90 '	Report	Campbell 16 ' (yellow card) 31 ' Jeannin (yellow card) 16 ' Wainwright 71 '	Stadium: The Shay; Attendance: 2,192; Referee: Paul Taylor

10 November 2001 18	Rushden & Diamonds	2–1	Halifax Town	Irthlingborough
	Partridge 32 ' Thomson 72 '	Report	Clarke (yellow card) 52 ' Redfearn (yellow card) 58 ' (goal) 89 ' Swales (yellow card) 66 ' Kerrigan (yellow card) 75 '	Stadium: Nene Park; Attendance: 3,883; Referee: David Crick

20 November 2001 19	Hartlepool United	3–0	Halifax Town	Hartlepool
	Lee (yellow card) 22' (yellow-red card) 72 ' Westwood (yellow card) 47 '	Report	Fitzpatrick (yellow card) 17 ' Middleton (red card) 24 ' Wood (yellow card) 76 '	Stadium: Victoria Park; Attendance: 2,963; Referee: Phil Richards

24 November 2001 20	Halifax Town	2–0	Torquay United	Halifax
	Bushell (yellow card) 44 ' Middleton 45 ' Fitzpatrick 57 '	Report	Hill (yellow card) 49 ' Hanson (yellow card) 87 '	Stadium: The Shay; Attendance: 1,681; Referee: Jeff Winter

1 December 2001 21	Cheltenham Town	2–1	Halifax Town	Cheltenham
	Victory 17 ' Howells (yellow card) 33 ' Alsop 66 '	Report	Harsley 14 ' Clarke (yellow card) 17 ' Middleton (yellow card) 52 ' Bushell (yellow card) 83 '	Stadium: Whaddon Road; Attendance: 3,304; Referee: Clive Penton

15 December 2001 22	Halifax Town	1–2	Shrewsbury Town	Halifax
	Crookes (red card) 84 ' Harsley 88 '	Report	Atkins 69', 82' (pen.); Drysdale (yellow card) 62 '	Stadium: The Shay; Attendance: 1,703; Referee: Michael Jones

26 December 2001 23	Macclesfield Town	1–1	Halifax Town	Macclesfield
	Smith 89 '	Report	Bushell 33 ' Wood (yellow card) 35 ' Woodward (red card) 57 ' Fitzpatrick (yellow card) 61 '	Stadium: Moss Rose; Attendance: 2,421; Referee: Mike Ryan

29 December 2001 24	Oxford United	6–1	Halifax Town	Oxford
	Moody 25', 33', 83' (pen.); Scott 69 ' Savage 79 ' Omoyinmi 84 '	Report	Harsley 48 ' Wood (red card) 23 ' Stoneman (yellow card) 36 ' (red card) 65 '	Stadium: Kassam Stadium; Attendance: 6,046; Referee: Alan Butler

12 January 2002 25	Exeter City	0–0	Halifax Town	Exeter
	Barlow (yellow card) 51 ' Flack (yellow card) 70 '	Report	Clarke (yellow card) 56 ' Kerrigan (yellow card) 66 ' Middleton (yellow card) 85 '	Stadium: St James Park; Attendance: 2,763; Referee: Mick Fletcher

19 January 2002 26	Halifax Town	3–0	Lincoln City	Halifax
	Jones 30', 66 ' Fitzpatrick 85 '	Report		Stadium: The Shay; Attendance: 2,007; Referee: Richard Beeby

22 January 2002 27	Kidderminster Harriers	2–0	Halifax Town	Kidderminster
	Foster 15', 89' (pen.); Appleby (yellow card) 15 ' Stamps (yellow card) 67 '	Report	Fitzpatrick (yellow card) 45 ' Clarke (yellow card) 60 '	Stadium: Aggborough Stadium; Attendance: 2,295; Referee: Rob Harris

26 January 2002 28	Scunthorpe United	4–0	Halifax Town	Scunthorpe
	Thom 19 ' Torpey 23', 90 ' Calvo-Garcia (yellow card) 80 ' (goal) 84 '	Report	Stoneman (yellow card) 55 ' Jones (yellow card) 57 '	Stadium: Glanford Park; Attendance: 3,465; Referee: Roger Furnandiz

29 January 2002 29	Halifax Town	1–1	Southend United	Halifax
	Jones 16 ' Stoneman (yellow card) 31' (yellow-red card) 87 ' Herbert (yellow card) 67 '	Report	Belgrave (yellow card) 38 ' Woodward 82' (o.g.)	Stadium: The Shay; Attendance: 1,251; Referee: Frazer Stretton

2 February 2002 30	Halifax Town	0–1	Hull City	Halifax
	Woodward (yellow card) 80 '	Report	Williams (yellow card) 10 ' Johnsson 38 ' Holt (yellow card) 53 '	Stadium: The Shay; Attendance: 3,400; Referee: Andy Hall

9 February 2002 31	Bristol Rovers	2–0	Halifax Town	Bristol
	Ommel 39 ' Ellington 72 '	Report	Harsley (yellow card) 53 '	Stadium: Memorial Stadium; Attendance: 6,921; Referee: Joe Ross

12 February 2002 32	Halifax Town	1–1	York City	Halifax
	Fitzpatrick 13 ' Swales (yellow card) 75 '	Report	Potter (yellow card) 27 ' Mitchell 48' (o.g.); Parkin (yellow card) 64 '	Stadium: The Shay; Attendance: 2,818; Referee: Howard Webb

16 February 2002 33	Halifax Town	0–2	Plymouth Argyle	Halifax
	Bushell (yellow card) 42 '	Report	Hodges 41 ' Wotton 43' (pen.)	Stadium: The Shay; Attendance: 2,330; Referee: Trevor Parkes

23 February 2002 34	Halifax Town	0–1	Swansea City	Halifax
	Stoneman (yellow card) 21 ' Middleton (yellow card) 67 '	Report	Watkin 10 ' O'Leary (yellow card) 41 ' Lacey (yellow card) 64 ' Phillips (yellow card) 90 '	Stadium: The Shay; Attendance: 1,601; Referee: Colin Webster

26 February 2002 35	Mansfield Town	2–1	Halifax Town	Mansfield
	Kelly 53 ' Greenacre 66 '	Report	Fitzpatrick 31 ' Stoneman (yellow card) 47 ' Middleton (yellow card) 67 ' Richardson (yellow card) 82 '	Stadium: Field Mill; Attendance: 4,513; Referee: Roy Burton

2 March 2002 36	Leyton Orient	3–1	Halifax Town	London
	Canham 31', 48 ' Christie 63 ' Gough (yellow card) 90 '	Report	Middleton (yellow card) 21 ' Redfearn 51 ' Stoneman (yellow card) 67 ' Fitzpatrick (yellow card) 90 ' Kerrigan (yellow card) 90 '	Stadium: Brisbane Road; Attendance: 4,748; Referee: Paul Armstrong

5 March 2002 37	Halifax Town	1–2	Rochdale	Halifax
	Stoneman (yellow card) 12' (yellow-red card) 39 ' Redfearn 32 ' Mitchell (yellow card) 90 '	Report	McEvilly (yellow card) 63 ' (goal) 81 ' McCourt 90 '	Stadium: The Shay; Attendance: 2,825; Referee: Mark Cowburn

9 March 2002 38	Shrewsbury Town	3–0	Halifax Town	Shrewsbury
	Heathcote 1 ' Rodgers (yellow card) 11 ' (goal) 55 ' Murray (yellow card) 61 ' Aiston 70 '	Report		Stadium: Gay Meadow; Attendance: 3,729; Referee: Graham Laws

12 March 2002 39	Halifax Town	1–0	Kidderminster Harriers	Halifax
	Midgley 9 '	Report	Broughton (yellow card) 53 ' Joy (yellow card) 76 '	Stadium: The Shay; Attendance: 1,227; Referee: John Brandwood

16 March 2002 40	Halifax Town	4–1	Cheltenham Town	Halifax
	Midgley 25 ' Fitzpatrick 53 ' (yellow card) 75 ' Mitchell (yellow card) 73 ' Harsley 81' (pen.), 85 ' Farrell (yellow card) 90 '	Report	Griffin (yellow card) 11 ' Victory 14 ' Walker (yellow card) 27 ' Victory (yellow card) 31 ' Book (red card) 78 '	Stadium: The Shay; Attendance: 1,870; Referee: Peter Walton

23 March 2002 41	Luton Town	5–0	Halifax Town	Luton
	Spring 21 ' Coyne 32 ' Howard 49 ' Crowe 75 ' Valois 87 ' Nicholls (yellow card) 90 '	Report	Middleton (yellow card) 81 ' Jones (red card) 83 ' Fitzpatrick (yellow card) 84 ' Swales (yellow card) 86 '	Stadium: Kenilworth Road; Attendance: 6,830; Referee: Phil Prosser

29 March 2002 42	Halifax Town	2–2	Carlisle United	Halifax
	Harsley (yellow card) 14 ' Woodward 22 ' Redfearn (yellow card) 42 ' (goal) 56 '	Report	Foran (yellow card) 14 ' (goal) 90 ' Stevens 34 ' (yellow card) 68 ' Andrews (yellow card) 62 '	Stadium: The Shay; Attendance: 2,728; Referee: Roy Pearson

1 April 2002 43	Darlington	5–0	Halifax Town	Darlington
	Clark 9', 16' (pen.); Conlon (yellow card) 48 ' (goal) 60 ' Heckingbottom (yellow card) 54 ' Ford 64 ' Sheeran 89 '	Report	Clarke (red card) 15 '	Stadium: Feethams; Attendance: 3,401; Referee: Mark Cooper

6 April 2002 44	Halifax Town	0–2	Hartlepool United	Halifax
	Smith (yellow card) 86 '	Report	Watson 9 ' Lee 63 ' Coppinger (yellow card) 73 '	Stadium: The Shay; Attendance: 1,838; Referee: Tony Bates

13 April 2002 45	Torquay United	2–4	Halifax Town	Torquay
	Ashford 39 ' Woods (yellow card) 58 ' Richardson 71 '	Report	Stoneman 45 ' Harsley 63 ' Middleton 78 ' Clarke (yellow card) 30 ' (goal) 82 ' Mitchell (yellow card) 26 '	Stadium: Plainmoor; Attendance: 2,692; Referee: Peter Jones

20 April 2002 46	Halifax Town	2–4	Rushden & Diamonds	Halifax
	Middleton (yellow card) 10 ' Harsley 23' (pen.); Redfearn (red card) 55 ' Fitzpatrick 85 '	Report	Lowe 46', 49 ' Wardley 62 ' Hall 76 ' Burgess (red card) 87 '	Stadium: The Shay; Attendance: 2,699; Referee: Mike Pike

=== F.A. Cup ===
17 November 2001 1	Halifax Town	2–1	Farnborough Town	Halifax
	Middleton 35 ' Wood 52 ' (yellow card) 78 ' Fitzpatrick (yellow card) 73 '	Report	Piper (yellow card) 19 ' (goal) 51 ' Patterson (yellow card) 78 '	Stadium: The Shay; Attendance: 1,914; Referee: Graham Frankland

8 December 2001 2	Halifax Town	1–1	Stoke City	Halifax
	Harsley 85 ' Redfearn (yellow card) 45 ' Woodward (yellow card) 83 '	Report	Cooke 27 ' Shtanyuk (yellow card) 45 '	Stadium: The Shay; Attendance: 3,335; Referee: Scott Mathieson

12 December 2001 2	Stoke City	3–0	Halifax Town	Stoke-on-Trent
	Guðjónsson 22 ' Iwelumo 27 ' Gunnarsson 47 ' Vandeurzen (yellow card) 41 ' Shtanyuk (yellow card) 71 '	Report	Kerrigan (yellow card) 28 ' Harsley (yellow card) 88 ' Wright (red card) 90 '	Stadium: Britannia Stadium; Attendance: 4,356; Referee: Scott Mathieson

=== Football League Cup ===
21 August 2001 1	Barnsley	2–0	Halifax Town	Barnsley
	Tinkler 27 ' Dyer 79 '	Report	Stoneman (yellow card) 9 '	Stadium: Oakwell; Attendance: 5,418; Referee: Roy Pearson

=== Football League Trophy (LDV Vans Trophy) ===
16 October 2001 1	Huddersfield Town	0–0	Halifax Town	Huddersfield
	Thorrington (yellow card) 23 '	Report	Clarke (yellow card) 69 '	Stadium: McAlpine Stadium; Attendance: 3,570; Referee: Colin Webster
