= 1999 Football League Third Division play-off final =

Association football match

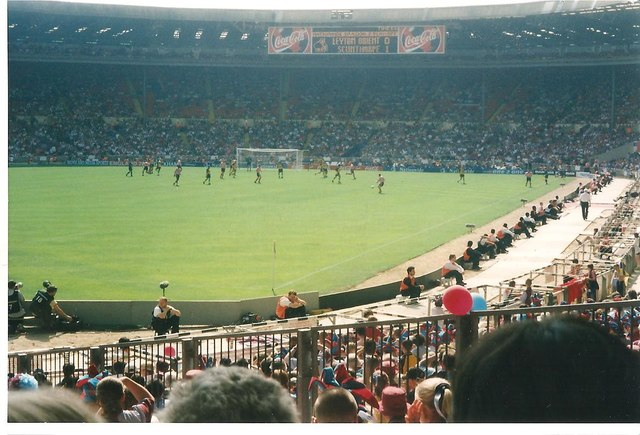
- The final took place at Wembley Stadium
Scunthorpe United	Leyton Orient
1	0
- Date: 29 May 1999
- Venue: Wembley Stadium, London
- Referee: Clive Wilkes
- Attendance: 36,985
- Weather: Warm

The 1999 Football League Third Division play-off final was an association football match which was played on 29 May 1999 at Wembley Stadium, London, between Scunthorpe United and Leyton Orient. It was to determine the fourth and final team to gain promotion from the Football League Third Division to the Second Division. The top three teams of the 1998–99 Football League Third Division, Brentford, Cambridge United and Cardiff City, gained automatic promotion to the Second Division, while those placed from fourth to seventh place in the table took part in play-offs. The winners of the play-off semi-finals competed for the final place for the 1999–2000 season in the Second Division. The losing semi-finalists were Rotherham United and Swansea City who had been defeated by Leyton Orient and Scunthorpe United respectively.

The referee for the final, which was played in front of 36,985 spectators, was Clive Wilkes. In the sixth minute, Gareth Sheldon took the ball round Dean Smith, the Leyton Orient captain, and played a chipped cross to the near post: Scunthorpe's Alejandro Calvo García scored with a header past Scott Barrett. Scunthorpe dominated the first half but Leyton Orient made two substitutions at half-time and started the second half with more pressure. Scunthorpe's goalkeeper Tom Evans made a number of saves and Martin Ling cleared Darryn Stamp's shot in the final minute of the game. The match ended 1–0 to Scunthorpe who were promoted to the Second Division.

Scunthorpe United finished their following season in 23rd place in the Second Division, losing four of their last five matches, and were relegated back to the Third Division. Leyton Orient ended their following season in 19th position in the Third Division.

== Route to the final ==
Football League Third Division final table, leading positions
Pos	Team	Pld	W	D	L	GF	GA	GD	Pts
1	Brentford	46	26	7	13	79	56	+23	85
2	Cambridge United	46	23	12	11	78	48	+30	81
3	Cardiff City	46	22	14	10	60	39	+21	80
4	Scunthorpe United	46	22	8	16	69	58	+11	74
5	Rotherham United	46	20	13	13	79	61	+18	73
6	Leyton Orient	46	19	15	12	68	59	+9	72
7	Swansea City	46	19	14	13	56	48	+8	71

Scunthorpe United finished the regular 1998–99 season in fourth position in the Third Division, the fourth tier of the English football league system, two places and two points ahead of Leyton Orient. Both therefore missed out on the three automatic places for promotion to the Second Division and instead took part in the play-offs to determine the fourth promoted team. Scunthorpe United finished six points behind Cardiff City (who were promoted in third place), seven behind Cambridge United (who were promoted in second place) and eleven behind league winners Brentford.

Leyton Orient's opposition for their play-off semi-final were Rotherham United with the first match of the two-legged tie taking place at Brisbane Road in Leyton on 16 May 1999. Chris Brown, writing in The Guardian suggested that the pressure affected the players and that it resulted in "a scrappy goalless match". Leyton Orient applied pressure on the Rotherham defence in the early stages with a series of corners and Amara Simba twice missed chances to score. The second half saw an unmarked Danny Hudson miss with a header from a John Varty cross and the match ended 0–0. The second leg was played three days later at Millmoor in Rotherham. The game ended goalless in regular time and went into extra time where the deadlock remained, the tie ending 0–0 on aggregate so had to be decided by a penalty shootout. Leyton Orient's goalkeeper Scott Barrett saved penalties from both Andy Roscoe and Paul Hurst, and Matt Lockwood scored the decisive goal to give his side a 4–2 win.

Scunthorpe United faced Swansea City in the other semi-final and the first leg was held at the Vetch Field in Swansea on 16 May 1999. Matthew Bound went close on 20 minutes but his shot from a Nick Cusack free kick went over the Scunthorpe crossbar. A minute before half-time, Bound put Swansea City ahead: Tony Bird was fouled by Russ Wilcox and Bound headed in the resulting free kick from Michael Howard from around 20 yards (18 m). Despite applying more pressure in the second half, Scunthorpe failed to score and Bird missed two chances for Swansea, striking one shot high and another against the post, and the match finished 1–0 to Swansea. The second leg took place at Glanford Park in Scunthorpe three days later. Andy Dawson put the home side ahead after two minutes to level the tie on aggregate. The goal was followed by a period of Scunthorpe pressure that included misses from both Jamie Forrester and Paul Harsley. With no further goals in regular time, the match went into extra time and Gareth Sheldon scored two minutes in to make it 2–0 to Scunthorpe. Bird then scored for Swansea City in the 98th minute before Sheldon increased Scunthorpe's lead in the 102nd minute. John Eyre then fouled Howard and was sent off after a 20-player fight erupted. The game ended 3–1 to Scunthorpe who progressed to the final 3–2 on aggregate.

== Match ==
=== Background ===
This was Leyton Orient's second appearance in the play-offs having won the 1989 Football League Fourth Division play-off final 2–1 on aggregate against Wrexham over two legs. They had played in the Third Division since being relegated in the 1994–95 season. Leyton Orient had twice played at Wembley Stadium in the 1930s as Clapton Orient when Lea Bridge Stadium, their home ground, was undergoing work. Scunthorpe United were taking part in their fifth play-offs, having lost in the semi-finals three times and the 1992 Football League Fourth Division play-off final in a penalty shootout against Blackpool. They had played in the fourth tier of English football since suffering relegation in the 1983–84 season. Both matches between the sides during the regular season ended in home wins: Leyton Orient won 1–0 at Brisbane Road in October 1998 while Scunthorpe United claimed a 2–0 victory at Glanford Park the following March. Simba and Tony Richards were lead scorers for Leyton Orient with 11 goals each. Forrester led the scoring for Scunthorpe United with 23 goals (20 in the league, 2 in the FA Cup and 1 in the League Cup) followed by Eyre on 17 (15 in the league, 2 in the FA Cup).

The referee for the final was Clive Wilkes. Leyton Orient adopted a 4–4–2 formation while Scunthorpe United played as a 3–4–3. The match was broadcast live in the United Kingdom on Sky Sports.

=== Summary ===
The match kicked off around 3 p.m. on 29 May 1999 at Wembley Stadium in front of 36,985 spectators in warm conditions. In the sixth minute, Sheldon went round Dean Smith, the Leyton Orient captain, and played a chipped cross to the near post where Alejandro Calvo García headed the ball past Barrett to give Scunthorpe the lead. Forrester then crossed for Chris Hope whose header went over the Leyton Orient crossbar. Dawson sent a free kick wide of the post before Barrett made saves from both him and Sheldon. Leyton Orient made two substitutions at half-time, with Craig Maskell and Alex Inglethorpe coming on for Stuart Hicks and Richards and started the second half with more pressure. Maskell passed to Steve Watts but Scunthorpe's goalkeeper Tom Evans gathered the ball at his feet. Watts also saw his attempted shot go wide of the Scunthorpe goal. In the 86th minute, Simba passed to Inglethorpe but his shot was saved by Evans. In the last minute, Barrett then denied Harsley's attempt to score before Martin Ling cleared Darryn Stamp's shot from the rebound. The match ended 1–0 to Scunthorpe who were promoted to the Second Division.

=== Details ===
29 May 1999	Scunthorpe United	1–0	Leyton Orient	Wembley Stadium, London
15:00	Calvo García 7'	Report		Attendance: 36,985; Referee: Clive Wilkes

GK	1	Tom Evans
RB	2	Paul Harsley
CB	3	Andy Dawson
CB	4	Richard Logan (yellow card)
LB	5	Russ Wilcox
RM	6	Chris Hope
CM	7	Justin Walker
CM	8	Jamie Forrester (substituted off) 85'
FW	9	Gareth Sheldon
FW	10	John Gayle (substituted off) 78' (yellow card)
LM	11	Alejandro Calvo García (substituted off) 76'
Substitutes:
LM	12	Gary Bull (substituted on) 85'
FW	13	Darryn Stamp (substituted on) 78'
MF	14	Steve Housham (substituted on) 76'
Manager:
Brian Laws

GK	1	Scott Barrett
RB	2	Roger Joseph (yellow card)
CB	3	Matt Lockwood
CB	4	Dean Smith
LB	5	Stuart Hicks (substituted off) 46'
RM	6	Simon Clark
CM	7	Martin Ling
CM	8	Tony Richards (substituted off) 46'
FW	9	Steve Watts
FW	10	Amara Simba
LM	11	Billy Beall
Substitutes:
FW	12	Craig Maskell (substituted on) 46'
FW	13	Alex Inglethorpe (substituted on) 46'
Manager:
Tommy Taylor

== Post-match ==
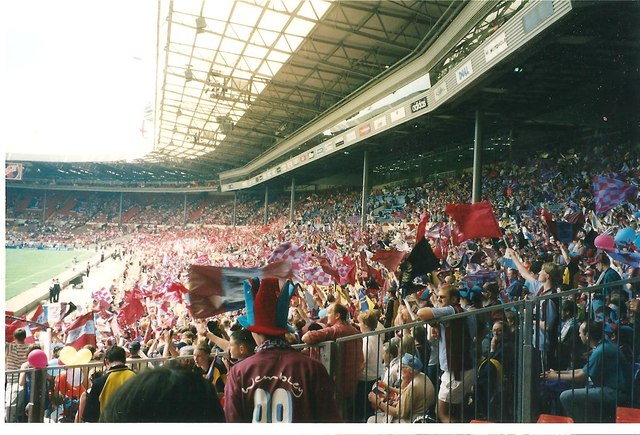
Scunthorpe United supporters celebrating after the final whistle

The Scunthorpe manager Brian Laws said "it's a better achievement getting promotion here than winning trophies with Nottingham Forest ... I've had a few lows and this is one of the highs." Spanish goalscorer Calvo García said he was unaware of Scunthorpe United before his move from Real Sociedad, but noted "the people there have made both me and my girlfriend very happy, and to clinch promotion at Wembley — you cannot ask for anything more than that." His mother was in the crowd having made her first trip from Spain to England, despite a fear of flying.

Scunthorpe United finished their following season in 23rd place in the Second Division, losing four of their last five matches, and were relegated back to the Third Division. Leyton Orient ended their following season in 19th position in the Third Division.
