= 1999–2000 Scunthorpe United F.C. season =

Scunthorpe United
1999–2000 season
- Manager: Brian Laws
- Stadium: Glanford Park
- Second Division: 23rd (relegated)
- FA Cup: First round
- League Cup: First round
- Football League Trophy: Northern quarter finals
- Top goalscorer: Ipoua (9)
- Average home league attendance: 4,064

During the 1999–2000 English football season, Scunthorpe United F.C. competed in the Football League Second Division.

== Season summary ==
In the 1999-2000 season, after a successful play-off final win to ensure promotion the season before, Scunthorpe weren't able to maintain their Second Division status and were relegated back to the Third Division in 23rd place.

== Final league table ==
Pos	Team	Pld	W	D	L	GF	GA	GD	Pts	Promotion or relegation
20	Oxford United	46	12	9	25	43	73	−30	45	
21	Cardiff City (R)	46	9	17	20	45	67	−22	44	Relegation to the Third Division
22	Blackpool (R)	46	8	17	21	49	77	−28	41	Relegation to the Third Division
23	Scunthorpe United (R)	46	9	12	25	40	74	−34	39	Relegation to the Third Division
24	Chesterfield (R)	46	7	15	24	34	63	−29	36	Relegation to the Third Division

Rules for classification: 1) Points; 2) Goal difference; 3) Goals scored
(R) Relegated

== Results ==
Scunthorpe United's score comes first

=== Legend ===
Win	Draw	Loss

=== Football League Second Division ===
Date	Opponent	Venue	Result	Attendance	Scorers
7 August 1999	Wigan Athletic	A	0–3	7,481	
14 August 1999	Wycombe Wanderers	H	0–1	4,092	
21 August 1999	Notts County	A	0–3	5,506	
28 August 1999	Bournemouth	H	3–1	3,376	Humphreys (2, 1 pen), Ipoua
30 August 1999	Cardiff City	A	1–1	8,006	Ipoua
4 September 1999	Bristol Rovers	H	0–2	4,496	
11 September 1999	Colchester United	A	1–0	3,280	Hodges
18 September 1999	Bristol City	H	1–2	4,542	Guinan
25 September 1999	Chesterfield	H	0–0	4,321	
2 October 1999	Stoke City	A	0–1	13,068	
10 October 1999	Burnley	A	2–1	10,752	Ipoua (2)
16 October 1999	Preston North End	H	1–1	5,336	Ipoua (pen)
19 October 1999	Oxford United	H	1–0	3,829	Ipoua
23 October 1999	Chesterfield	A	1–1	3,464	Fickling
2 November 1999	Cambridge United	A	3–1	3,285	Hope, Harsley, Hodges
6 November 1999	Millwall	H	1–4	4,550	Cornforth
12 November 1999	Brentford	A	3–4	4,657	Ipoua (pen), Harsley, Jandro
23 November 1999	Gillingham	H	1–4	3,444	Ipoua
27 November 1999	Reading	A	1–1	6,142	Hodges
4 December 1999	Wigan Athletic	H	1–2	3,463	Hodges
18 December 1999	Bury	H	0–2	3,137	
26 December 1999	Oldham Athletic	A	1–1	5,998	Hope
28 December 1999	Blackpool	H	1–0	4,476	Omoyinmi
3 January 2000	Luton Town	A	1–4	5,574	Hodges
15 January 2000	Wycombe Wanderers	A	1–2	4,850	Sheldon
22 January 2000	Notts County	H	1–0	4,035	Ipoua
29 January 2000	Bournemouth	A	1–1	4,802	Dawson
1 February 2000	Wrexham	H	0–2	2,851	
5 February 2000	Cardiff City	H	0–0	3,614	
12 February 2000	Bristol Rovers	A	1–1	8,236	Hope
19 February 2000	Reading	H	2–2	4,082	Torpey, Quailey
26 February 2000	Bristol City	A	1–2	9,897	Quailey
4 March 2000	Colchester United	H	0–0	4,253	
7 March 2000	Millwall	A	2–1	8,772	Logan, Quailey
11 March 2000	Cambridge United	H	0–3	3,964	
18 March 2000	Gillingham	A	1–3	6,822	Harsley
21 March 2000	Brentford	H	0–0	2,686	
25 March 2000	Oldham Athletic	H	1–2	3,807	Quailey
28 March 2000	Wrexham	A	1–3	2,139	Quailey
1 April 2000	Bury	A	0–3	3,546	
8 April 2000	Luton Town	H	1–2	3,811	Dawson
15 April 2000	Blackpool	A	2–0	5,542	Bull, Sheldon
22 April 2000	Preston North End	A	0–1	15,518	
24 April 2000	Stoke City	H	0–2	5,435	
29 April 2000	Oxford United	A	0–2	6,752	
6 May 2000	Burnley	H	1–2	5,862	Hodges

=== FA Cup ===
Round	Date	Opponent	Venue	Result	Attendance	Goalscorers
R1	29 October 1999	Rushden & Diamonds	A	0–2	4,112	

=== League Cup ===
Round	Date	Opponent	Venue	Result	Attendance	Goalscorers
R1 1st Leg	10 August 1999	Huddersfield Town	H	0–2	3,398	
R1 2nd Leg	24 August 1999	Huddersfield Town	A	0–0 (lost 0-2 agg)	4,345	

=== Football League Trophy ===
Round	Date	Opponent	Venue	Result	Attendance	Goalscorers
NR2	8 January 2000	Lincoln City	A	2–1	3,617	Hodges, Sheldon
NQF	25 January 2000	Chesterfield	H	1–2	2,532	Stamp

== Squad ==
Note: Flags indicate national team as defined under FIFA eligibility rules; some limited exceptions apply. Players may hold more than one non-FIFA nationality.

No.	Pos.	Nation	Player
1	GK	NIR	Tom Evans
2	DF	ENG	Paul Harsley
3	DF	ENG	Andy Dawson
4	MF	ENG	Richard Logan
5	DF	ENG	Russ Wilcox
6	DF	ENG	Chris Hope
7	MF	ENG	Justin Walker
8	MF	ENG	Lee Hodges
9	FW	ENG	Gareth Sheldon
10	FW	ENG	Steve Torpey
11	MF	ESP	Jandro
12	FW	ENG	Gary Bull
13	GK	ENG	Ross Turner
14	MF	ENG	Steve Housham

No.	Pos.	Nation	Player
15	DF	ENG	Ashley Fickling
16	DF	ENG	Mark Jackson
17	MF	ENG	Wayne Graves
18	DF	ENG	Nathan Stanton
19	FW	ENG	Darryn Stamp
20	MF	ENG	Lee Marshall
21	DF	ENG	Brian Laws
22	GK	ENG	Leigh Herrick
23	MF	ENG	Matt Sparrow
24	FW	ENG	Mark Anderson
25	FW	CMR	Guy Ipoua
26	DF	NIR	Richard Clarke
27	MF	ENG	Terry Barwick
29	FW	ENG	James Morris

=== Left club during season ===
Note: Flags indicate national team as defined under FIFA eligibility rules; some limited exceptions apply. Players may hold more than one non-FIFA nationality.

No.	Pos.	Nation	Player
22	FW	ENG	Ritchie Humphreys (on loan from Sheffield Wednesday)
13	GK	ENG	Tim Clarke (to Kidderminster Harriers)
26	FW	ENG	Steve Guinan (on loan from Nottingham Forest)
10	FW	ENG	John Gayle (to Shrewsbury Town)
26	MF	TTO	Clint Marcelle (on loan from Barnsley)
13	GK	FRA	Lionel Pérez (on loan from Newcastle United)

No.	Pos.	Nation	Player
16	DF	ENG	Sean McAuley (to Rochdale)
13	GK	DEN	Morten Hyldgaard (on loan from Coventry City)
27	MF	ENG	John Cornforth (to Exeter City)
26	MF	ENG	Emmanuel Omoyinmi (on loan from West Ham United)
27	FW	ENG	Richard Hodgson (Released)
28	DF	FRA	Stéphane Pounewatchy (Retired)
