= List of people from Walsall =

Walsall (/ˈwɔːlsɔːl/, or /ˈwɒlsɔːl/; locally /ˈwɔːrsʌl/) is a large market town and administrative centre in West Midlands County, England. Historically part of Staffordshire, it is located 9 miles (14 km) north-west of Birmingham, 7 miles (11 km) east of Wolverhampton and 9 miles (14 km) from Lichfield. This list a list of notable people who were born in, lived in, or were otherwise strongly associated with Walsall.

== Culture ==
=== Acting ===
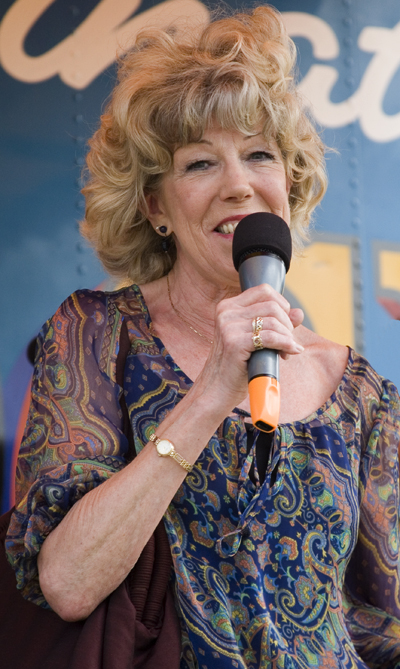
Sue Nicholls, 2010

- Bobby Ash (1925–2007), British-Canadian actor born in Walsall
- Zoe Dawson (born 1979 in Walsall) actress, minor roles in the BBC soap opera Doctors
- Don Gilet (born 1967 in Caldmore) actor, roles in BBC productions Babyfather, EastEnders and 55 Degrees North.
- Jeffrey Holland (born Jeffrey Michael Parkes, 1946 in Walsall) actor, roles in TV sitcoms and in Hi-de-Hi!, attended Queen Mary's Grammar School.
- Matthew Marsden (born 1973 in West Bromwich) stage and film actor, brought up on the Yew Tree Estate in Walsall and schooled in Wednesbury and Great Barr.
- Peter McEnery (born 1940 in Walsall) stage TV and film actor. Gave Hayley Mills her first "grown-up" screen kiss in the 1964 film The Moon-Spinners.
- Sue Nicholls (born 1943 in Walsall) actress, played Audrey Roberts in Coronation Street.
- Erin O'Connor (born 1978 in Brownhills) model and TV actress, attended Brownhills Community School
- Meera Syal (born 1961) comedian, writer, playwright, singer, journalist, producer and actress. Brought up in Essington and attended Queen Mary's High School.
- Richard Wattis (born 1912 in Wednesbury – 1975), actor
- Frank Windsor (born 1927 in Walsall) actor, mainly on TV. Attended Queen Mary's Grammar School. Played DS John Watt in Z-Cars from 1962 to 1965.

=== Music ===
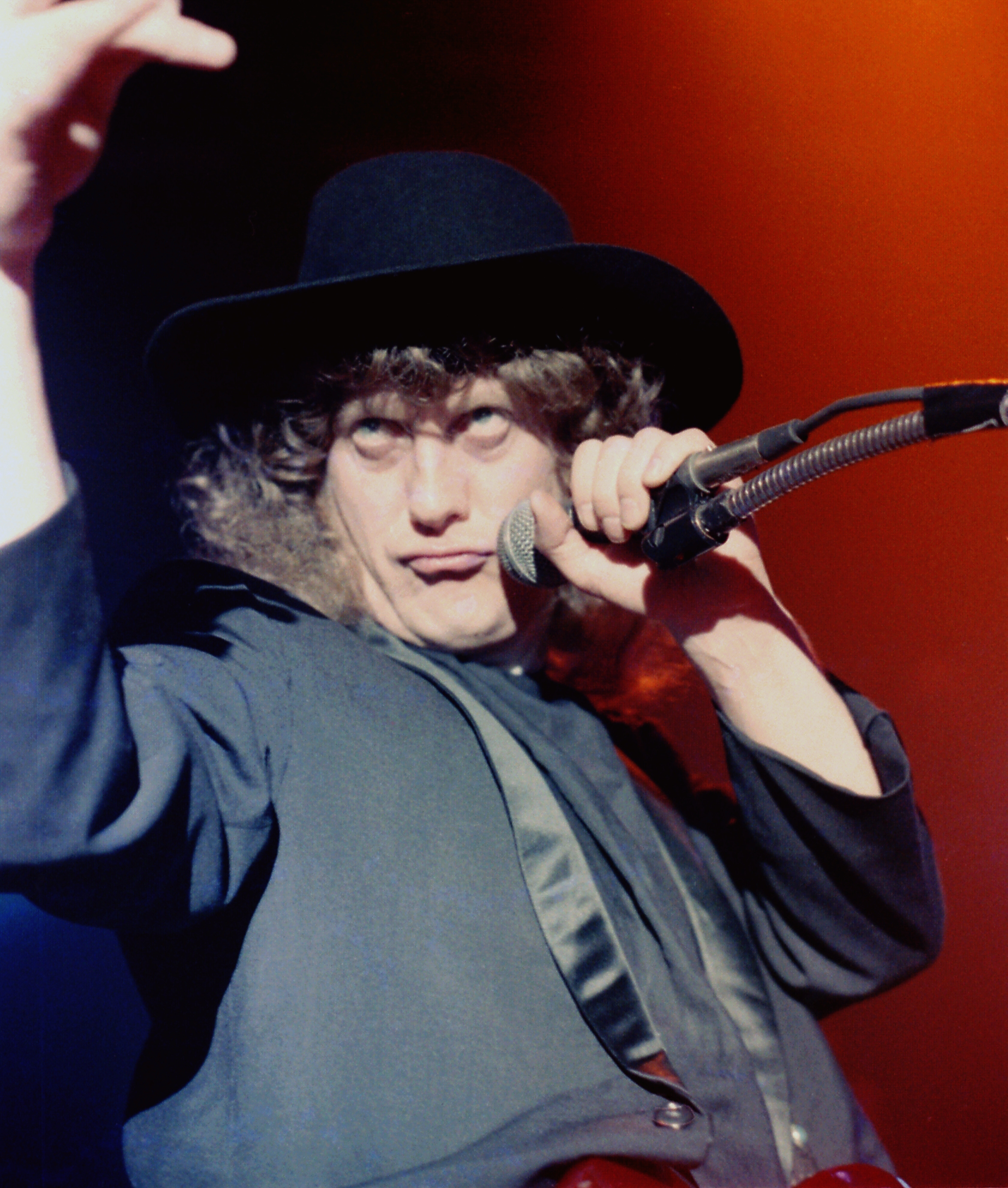
Noddy Holder, 1981

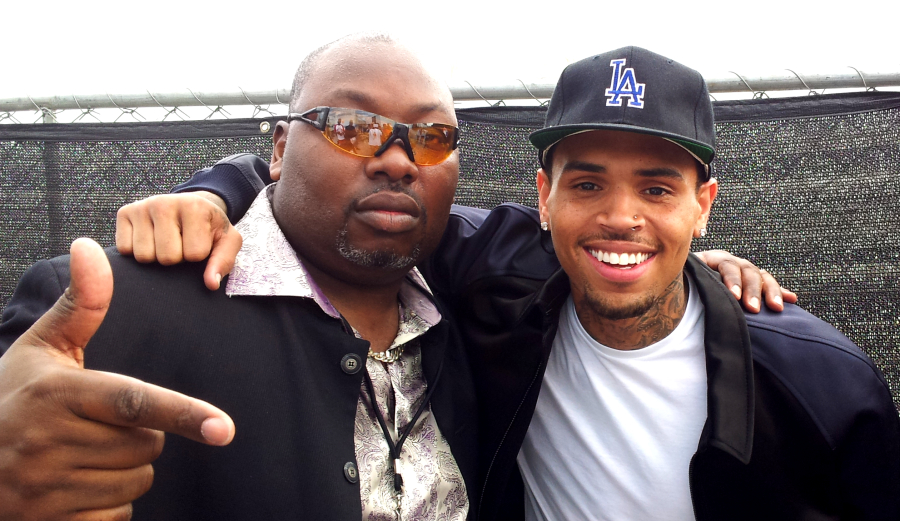
Mark Duffus (Blak Prophetz) & Chris Brown at Los Angeles Awards, USA, 2013

- Joe Hicklin, vocalist of Big Special
- Amar (born 1982), British Indian singer
- Andy C (born 1976), DJ, record producer and co-founder of RAM Records
- Blak_Prophetz aka Mark Duffus (born 1967 in Caldmore Green, Walsall) DJ, Musician, Record_Producer, Rapper attended Whitehall Infants, Blue Coat C of E Junior and Secondary School. Founder/Owner of the Record label Digital_Jukebox_Records.
- Rob Collins (1963 in Rowley Regis – 1996) musician, original keyboardist of The Charlatans (the English band, not the American band)
- Martin Degville (born 1961 in Walsall) lead singer and co-songwriter of the English pop band Sigue Sigue Sputnik.
- Goldie aka Clifford Joseph Price, (born 1965 in Walsall) musician, DJ, graffiti artist, visual artist and actor, attended St. Francis of Assisi RC Secondary School in Aldridge
- Rob Halford (born 1951 in Sutton Coldfield) raised in Walsall, singer songwriter, lead vocalist for the heavy metal band Judas Priest.
- Noddy Holder (born 1946 in Caldmore) musician and actor, English lead singer and guitarist in glam rock band Slade
- Tom Major-Ball (1879 in Bloxwich – 1962) music hall and circus performer and father of John Major, former Prime Minister
- Frank Mullings (1881 in Walsall – 1953) a leading English tenor with Beecham Opera Company and its successor, the British National Opera Company
- Mark Rhodes (born 1981 in Darlaston) singer and TV presenter, finished 2nd in the 2nd series of Pop Idol, lives in Wombourne.
- Jorja Smith (born 1997 in Walsall) singer-songwriter
- Connie Talbot (born 2000) from Streetly, English singer based in Walsall 2nd place in the first series of Britain's Got Talent (series 1)
- Kathryn Tickell (born 8 June 1967 in Walsall) is an English musician, noted for her mastery of the Northumbrian smallpipes and fiddle.
- Dave Walker (born 1945 in Walsall) singer and guitarist, front-man for a number of bands; including Idle Race, Savoy Brown, Fleetwood Mac, and, briefly, Black Sabbath.
- John Cooke guitarist and bassist of Napalm Death, Venomous Concept, and Malevolent Creation.

=== TV and radio ===
- Alex Lester (born 1956 in Walsall) radio broadcaster,
- Andrew Peach (born in Bloxwich c. 1970) BBC Radio presenter
- Bob Warman (born 1946) TV presenter,
- Leila Williams (born in Walsall 1937) beauty queen and Blue Peter presenter from 1958 until 1962

=== Visual arts ===
- Orlando Dutton born in Walsall 1 April 1894, was an English-born Australian monumental, figurative and architectural sculptor

== Politics ==
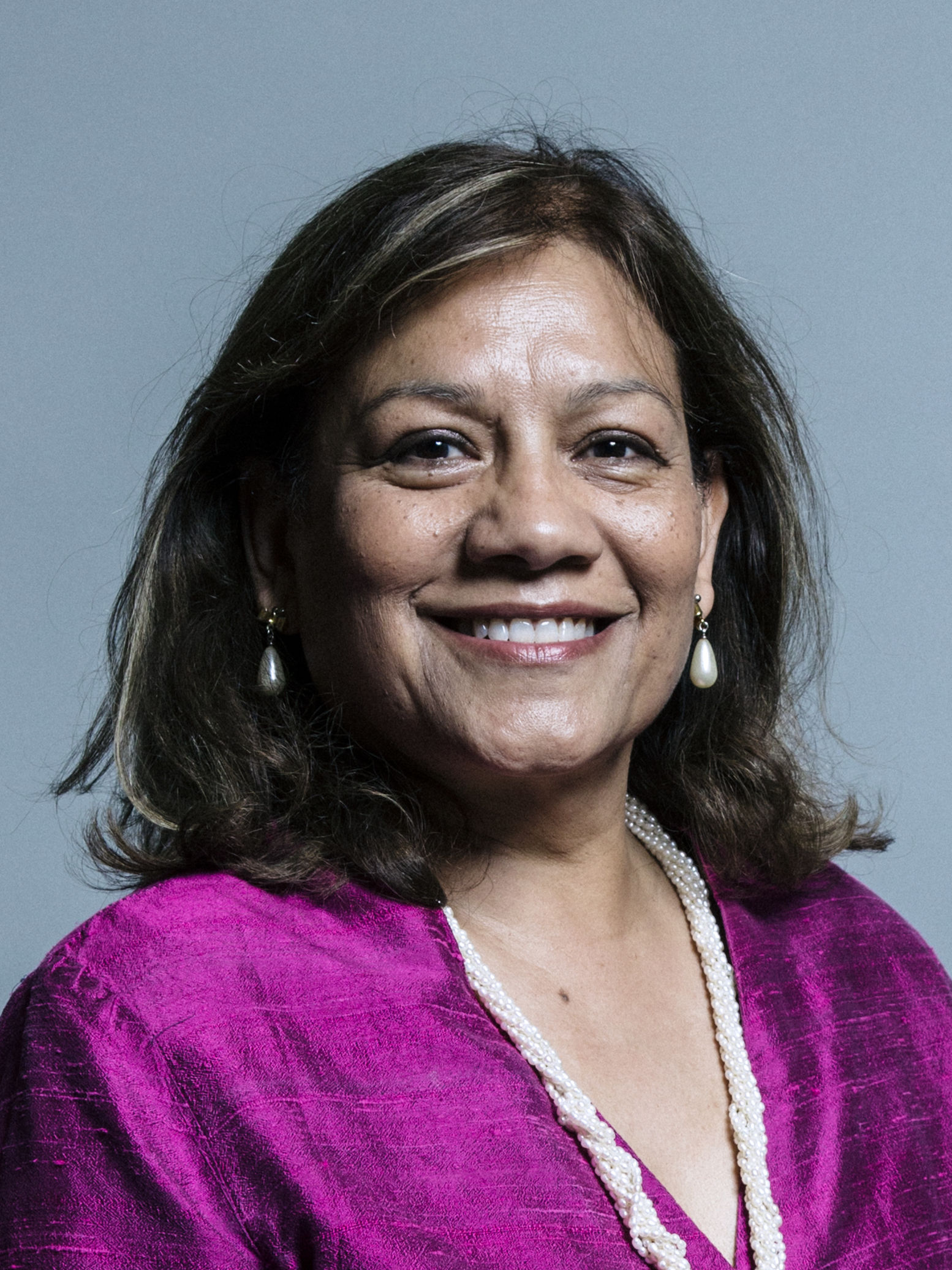
Valerie Vaz MP, 2017

- William Dixon Allott, (1817–1892) born in Walsall, Mayor of Adelaide 1873–1874
- David Ennals, Baron Ennals (1922–1995) Labour Party politician born in Walsall
- Bruce George (born 1942) Labour Party politician, MP for Walsall South 1974–2010
- Eddie Hughes (born 1968) Conservative Party politician, MP for Walsall North 2017 to date.
- Joseph Leckie (Born Glasgow 24 May 1866 – 9 August 1938) after whom Joseph Leckie school, now an academy was named. MP for Walsall 1931 - 1938.
- Sir Harmar Nicholls (later Lord Harmar-Nicholls) (1912 in Walsall – 2000) Conservative Party politician, MP for Peterborough 1950–1974. Father of Sue Nicholls (see above).
- John Stonehouse (1925 – 1988) Labour Party politician, MP for Walsall North 1974–1976, notable for his unsuccessful attempt to fake his own death in 1974
- David Winnick (born 1933) Labour Party politician, MP for Walsall North 1979–2017.
- Jenny Tonge, Baroness Tonge (born 1941 in Walsall) politician, Liberal Democrat MP for Richmond Park in London 1997–2005, made a life peer in June 2005.
- Valerie Vaz (born 1954) Labour politician and solicitor MP for Walsall South 2010 to date.

== Public service and commerce ==
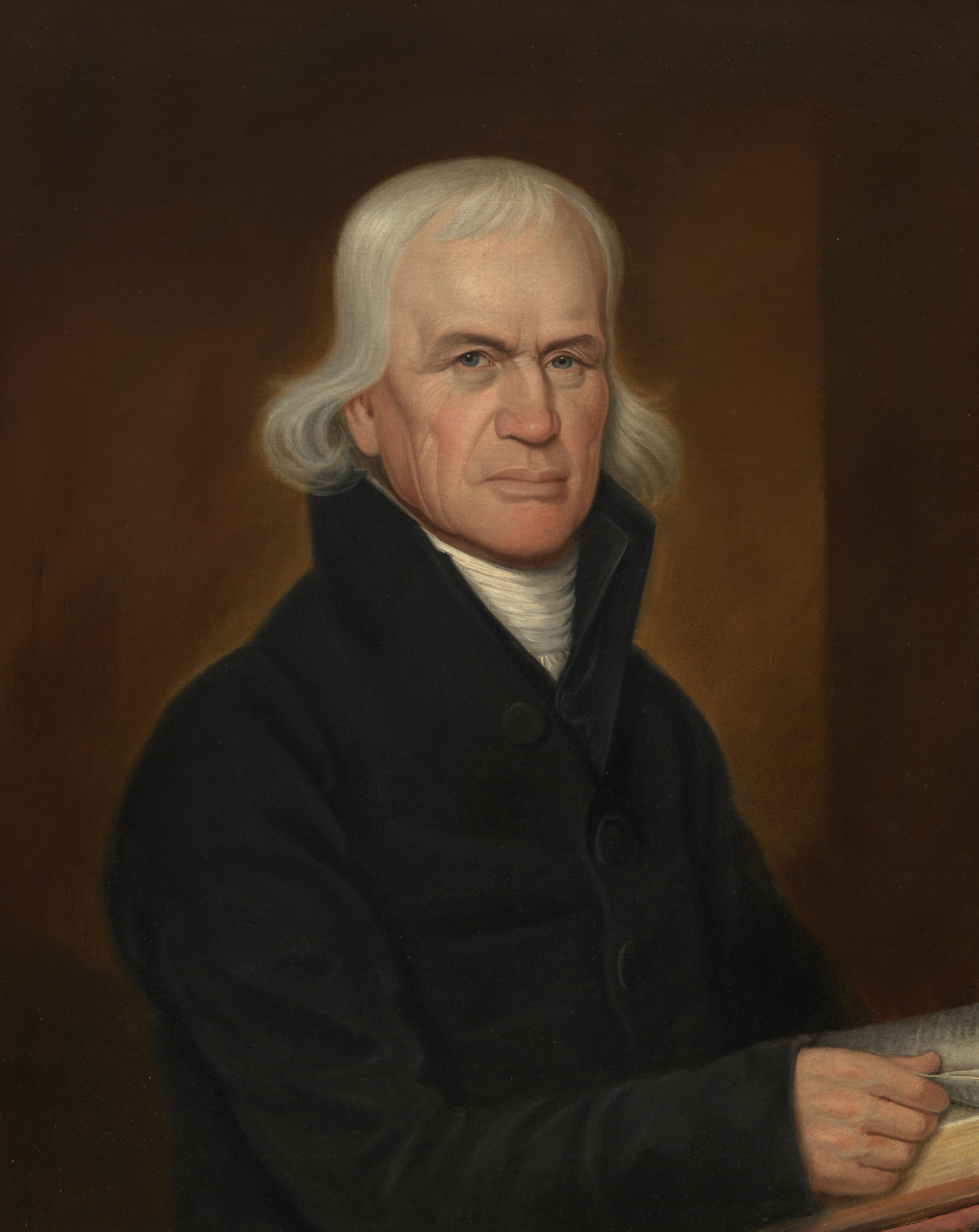
Francis Asbury

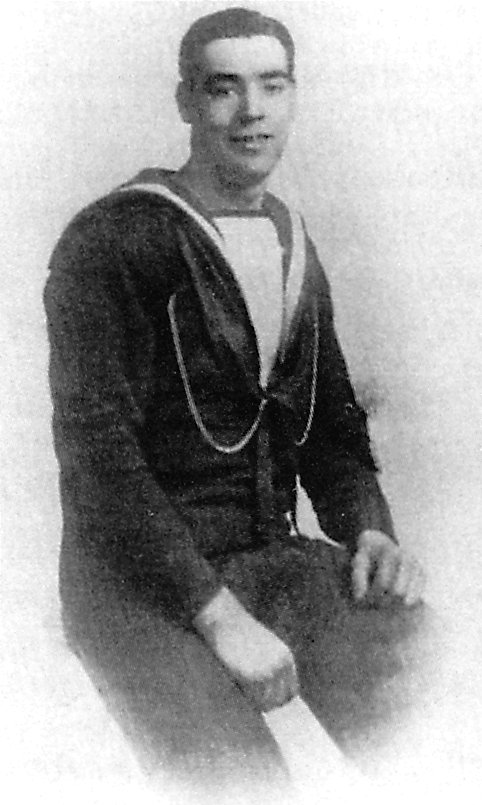
John Henry Carless, VC

- Francis Asbury (1745 Hamstead Bridge – 1816) joint founder of the Methodist movement in the United States, brought up in Gt Barr, emigrated 1771.
- Mike Ashley (born 1964), British billionaire retail entrepreneur focused in the sporting goods market
- Sir Terence Beckett (1923 in Walsall – 2013) businessman, chairman of Ford and later, director-general of the Confederation of British Industry
- Margaret Bromhall (born 1890 in Walsall) first radiotherapist appointed to a radiotherapy department, at North Middlesex Hospital in London
- John Henry Carless (1896 in Walsall – 1917) recipient of the Victoria Cross during the First World War
- Reverend Harry Moore Dauncey (1863 in Walsall – 1932) missionary in Papua New Guinea
- Sister Dora (1832–1878) Anglican nun and a nurse in Walsall. She is honoured for her compassion and her medical work by a statue in the centre of town.
- Michael L. Fitzgerald (born Walsall in 1937) Roman Catholic Cardinal, expert on Muslim-Christian relations
- Martin Fowler (born 1963 in Walsall) software developer
- Frederick Gibbs (born 1899 in Walsall) World War I Flying Ace
- Sir Harry Hinsley (1918 in Birchills – 1998) historian and cryptanalyst, worked at Bletchley Park and became Master of St John's College, Cambridge University
- James Alexander Holden (1 April 1835 – 1 June 1887) was the businessman who founded the South Australian company which eventually produced the Holden automobile.
- Samuel Leeds (born 1991), social media influencer, property trainer and investor
- Sir Len Peach (1932 in Walsall – 2016) Chief Executive of the National Health Service 1986 – 1989.
- Air Chief Marshal Stuart William Peach, Baron Peach (born Walsall, 1956) former RAF officer and Chief of the Defence Staff.
- Sir Edwin Thomas Smith (6 April 1830 – 25 December 1919) was an English-born South Australian brewer, businessman, councillor, mayor, politician and philanthropist.
- Air Vice-Marshal Sidney Webster (1900 in Walsall – 1984) aviator and senior officer in the RAF

== Sport ==
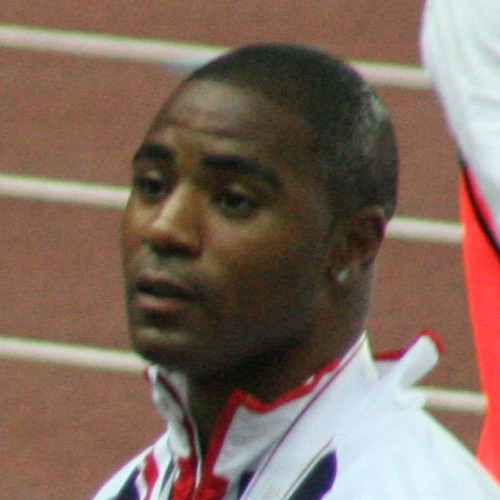
Mark Lewis-Francis, 2007

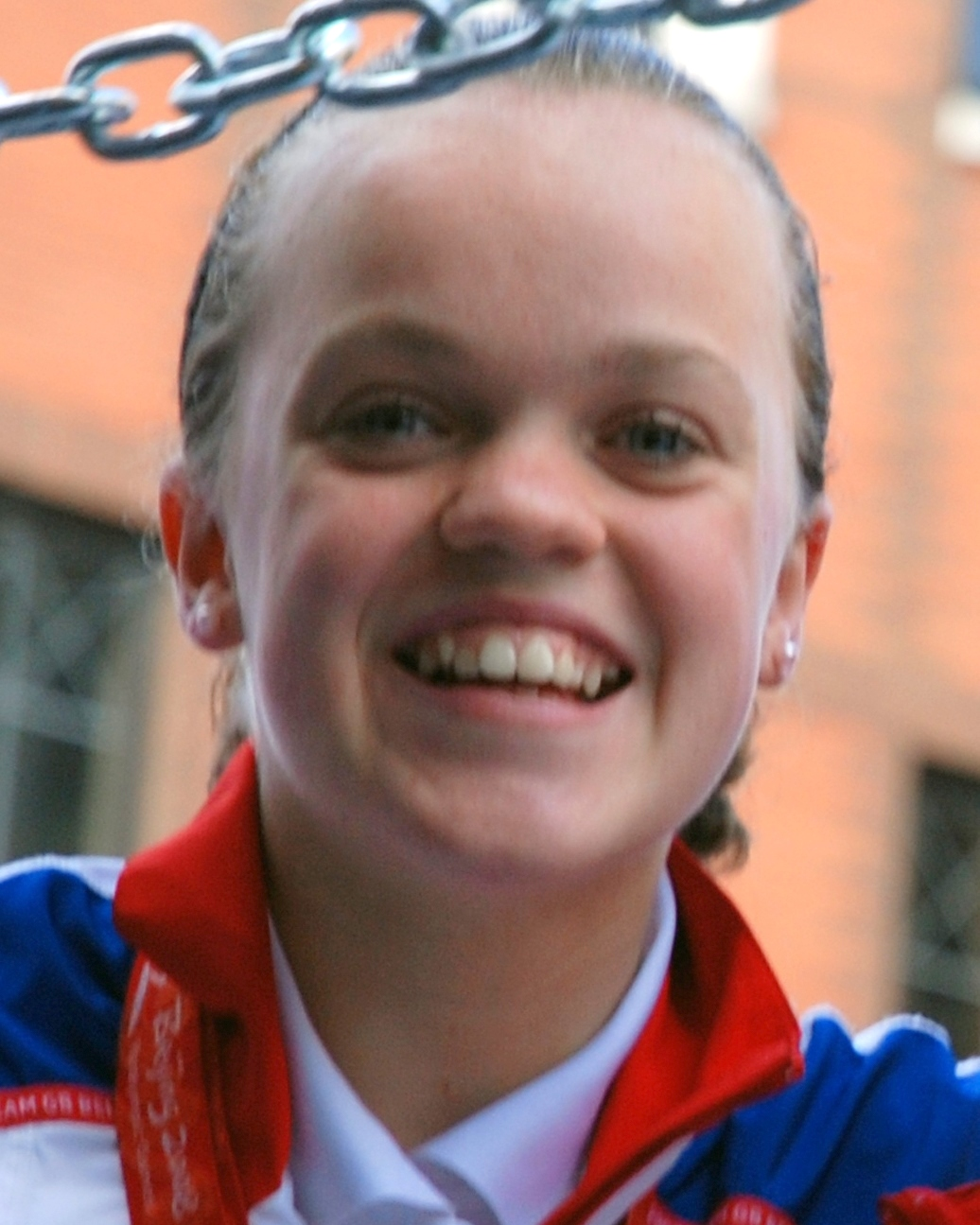
Ellie Simmonds, 2008

- Norman Ashe (born 1943), footballer
- Fred Bakewell (1908 in Walsall – 1983) was a Northamptonshire and England opening batsman, renowned largely because of his unorthodox methods
- David Brown (born 1942 in Walsall) former English cricketer, attended Queen Mary's Grammar School played in twenty six Tests from 1965 to 1969
- Colin Charvis (born 1972 in Sutton Coldfield) attended Queen Mary's Grammar School in Walsall, a former captain of the Wales national rugby union team
- Leon Drysdale (born 1991), footballer
- Nick Gillingham (born 1967 in Walsall) swimmer, competed in the 1988 Summer Olympics in Seoul and the 1992 Summer Olympics in Barcelona
- Terry Holbrook (born 1945 in Walsall) football referee formerly in the Football League and Premier League
- Dean Keates (born 1978 in Beechdale) retired footballer and former First Team manager of Walsall.
- Vaughan Lee (born 1982) Mixed Martial Artist formerly competing in UFC.
- Mark Lewis-Francis (born Darlason 1982) 100 metres sprinter, member of the gold medal winning 4x100 metres relay team at the 2004 summer Olympics.
- Robert Marshall (1869–1937), cricketer
- Rupert Moon former Llanelli and Welsh rugby international, known as the "Walsall Welshman" he became a radio and television presenter in Wales.
- Lee Naylor (born in 1980 in Mossley) former professional footballer
- Jaydon Paddock (born 2001 in Walsall), English trampoline gymnast
- David Platt (born Walsall 1966) English-born Australian darts player
- Rachel Unitt (born 1982 in Bentley) England Women's footballer
- Ellie Simmonds (born 1994) Paralympian swimmer, won gold in the 2008 and 2012 Summer Paralympics.

== Writing ==
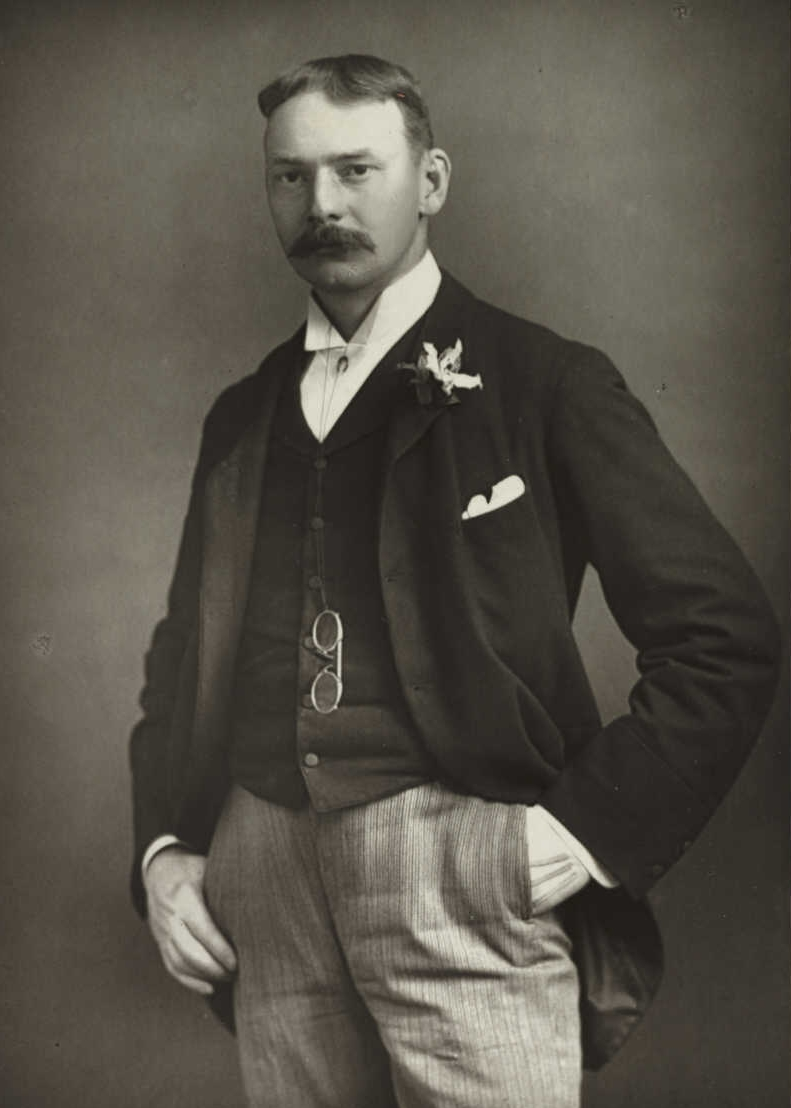
Jerome K. Jerome, 1890

- John Byrne (born 1950 in Walsall) comic book creator, raised in West Bromwich
- Peter Corey (born 1946 in Walsall) author of the Coping With children's book series and also a TV actor.
- Jerome K. Jerome (1859 in Caldmore – 1927) writer and humourist, author of comic travelogue Three Men in a Boat (1889).
- Paul McDonald (born 1961 in Walsall) comic novelist and academic.
- Sir Henry Newbolt (1862 in Bilston – 1938) poet, novelist and historian and old boy of Queen Mary's Grammar School.
- Nick Redfern (born 1964 in Pelsall) author and UFO researcher

== Science ==
- Lindon Eaves (1944–2022) geneticist and Anglican priest, born in Walsall
- John Edward Gray (1800–1875), zoologist, born in Walsall.

== Murderers ==
- Raymond Morris (1929 in Walsall – 2014) convicted of the Cannock Chase murders in the late 1960s, served 45 years in prison.
- Louise Porton (born 1996) woman who murdered her two children in 2018, formerly lived in Walsall

== Others ==
- Thomas Hughes, (1818–1876), Anglican minister and abolitionist
