= Michael Coghlan =

English footballer

Personal information
- Date of birth: 15 January 1985
- Place of birth: Sunderland, England
- Height: 1.78 m (5 ft 10 in)
- Position: Midfielder

Youth career
- –: Darlington

Senior career*
Years	Team	Apps	(Gls)
2003–2005	Darlington	3	(0)
2004	→ Harrogate Town (loan)	1	(0)
2004–2005	→ Bishop Auckland (loan)		
2005	Ryhope CA		
2005–2006	Durham City		
2006–2007	Crook Town		
2007–200?	Bishop Auckland		
200?–2011	Sunderland RCA		
2011	Jarrow Roofing		
2011–2013	Chester-le-Street Town		
2013	Seaham Red Star		
2013–	Washington		
- * Club domestic league appearances and goals

Michael Coghlan (born 15 January 1985) is an English footballer who plays for Northern League club Washington.

A midfielder, Coghlan played in the Football League for Darlington and in non-league football for numerous clubs in the north-east of England.

== Football career ==
Sunderland-born Coghlan began his football career with Darlington. As a 16-year-old, he was playing for their reserve team, and was included in the travelling squad, though not among the matchday 16, for Darlington's League Cup visit to Wolverhampton Wanderers in September 2003. A week later, he was an unused substitute for the Third Division match at home to Southend United, and on 11 October, as a member of "one of the youngest and smallest squads in the Third Division" – Coghlan himself had been dubbed "pint-sized" – he made his debut in the Football League. He entered the match as a second-half substitute with his team already two goals down at home to Bristol Rovers; it finished as a 4–0 defeat. In the Football League Trophy, against a Hull City side with eleven changes from their previous league match, Coghlan's "low, fierce shot" was blocked, rebounding to Mark Sheeran who scored to reduce Hull's lead to 2–1, but Darlington were eliminated.

He played twice more in the league in December, before joining Northern Premier League club Harrogate Town on loan in March 2004. The manager thought he "maybe struggled with the pace of the game" in his first appearance, in a defeat at Alfreton Town, and he was back with Darlington a few days later. He played regularly for the reserves in 2004–05 – according to his 2004 profile on the club's website, he had "shown he is a good passer of the ball with plenty to offer in midfield" – but in November was one of seven players with contracts due to expire at the end of the season whom manager David Hodgson listed for transfer or loan and told to prove their worth to the club. After spending time with Bishop Auckland, another Northern Premier League club, on loan, Coghlan finished the season with Darlington's reserves, and was released when his contract expired.

He then went on a tour of non-league football in the north-east of England, playing for clubs including Ryhope CA, Durham City, Crook Town, another spell at Bishop Auckland, Sunderland RCA, Jarrow Roofing, Chester-le-Street Town, Seaham Red Star, and most recently Washington.

He also captained Humbledon Plains Farm, a Sunderland-based team, to victory in the 2014 FA Sunday Cup.
