= Paul Harsley =

British footballer (born 1978)

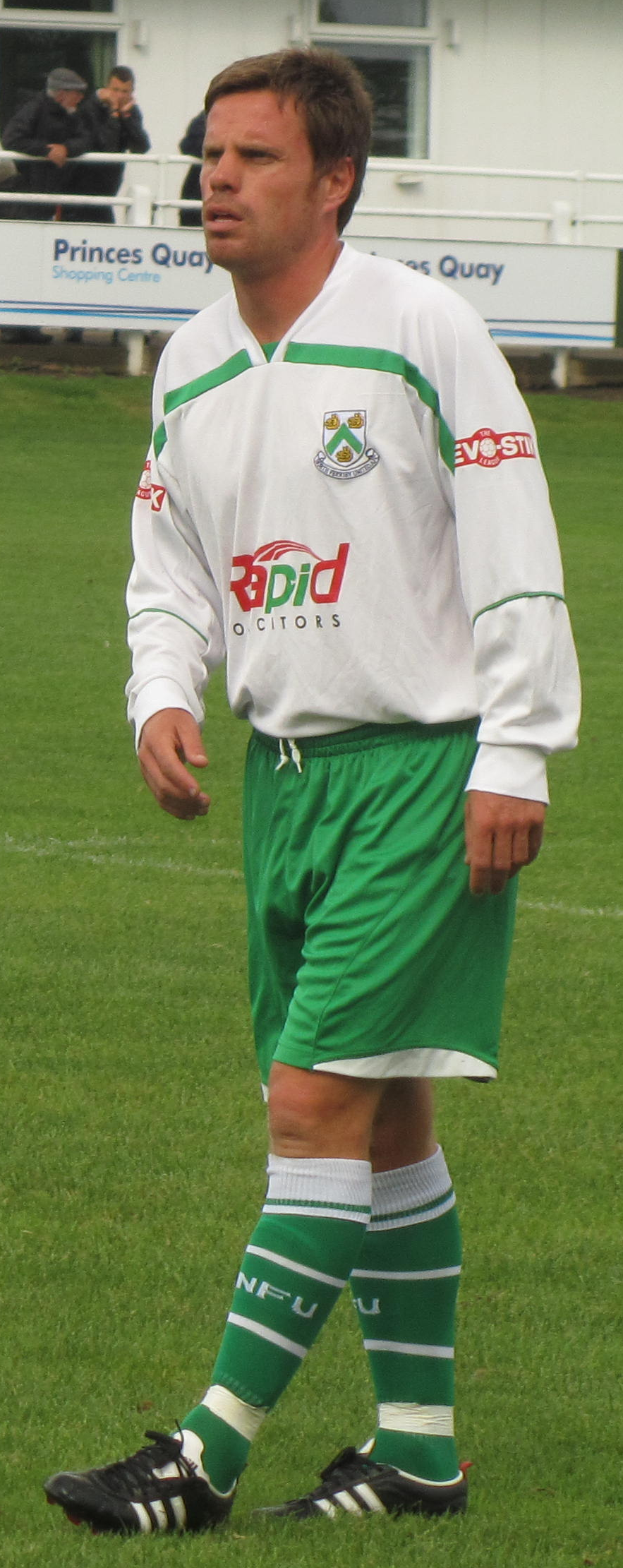
- Harsley playing for North Ferriby United in 2011

Personal information
- Full name: Paul Harsley
- Date of birth: 29 May 1978 (age 48)
- Place of birth: Scunthorpe, England
- Height: 5 ft 8 in (1.73 m)
- Position: Midfielder

Youth career
- ?–1996: Grimsby Town

Senior career*
Years	Team	Apps	(Gls)
1995–1997	Grimsby Town	0	(0)
1997–2001	Scunthorpe United	128	(5)
2001–2002	Halifax Town	45	(11)
2002–2004	Northampton Town	59	(2)
2004–2006	Macclesfield Town	107	(11)
2006–2008	Port Vale	73	(6)
2008–2010	Chesterfield	20	(1)
2009–2010	→ Darlington (loan)	3	(0)
2010	→ York City (loan)	9	(1)
2010–2012	North Ferriby United	56	(7)
Total		500	(44)

Managerial career
- 2018: Barnsley (caretaker)
- 2018–2020: Manchester City EDS
- 2022: Huddersfield Town (caretaker)
- * Club domestic league appearances and goals

Paul Harsley (born 29 May 1978) is an English former footballer and football coach.

Harsley played as a midfielder from 1996 until 2012 and made 583 league and cup appearances, scoring 52 goals. He spent the majority of his career in the English Football League, though he also had spells in the Conference Premier and Northern Premier League. His professional footballing career began at Grimsby Town in 1996, though he switched to Scunthorpe United a year later, without having appeared for Grimsby. He spent four seasons with the club, racking up 128 league appearances, before moving to Halifax Town. In 2002, he transferred to Northampton Town, and after a couple of years he moved on again to Macclesfield Town. In 2006, he signed with Port Vale, yet again he stayed just two years, though he did pick up a Player of the Season award before signing with Chesterfield. In 2010, he left Chesterfield, having been largely unsuccessful, and spending much of his time on loan at Darlington and York City. He finished his career in non-League football with two years at North Ferriby United. He made 500 league and 83 cup appearances in total, scoring 52 goals. He was named Player of the Year at Scunthorpe United (1999), Northampton Town (2003), Macclesfield Town (2005), and Port Vale (2008).

He coached at Scunthorpe United, Birmingham City and Barnsley and was appointed Barnsley's caretaker manager in February 2018. He coached Manchester City EDS from 2018 to 2020, was a first-team development coach at Birmingham until 2022, and then joined Huddersfield Town as a first-team assistant coach. In September 2022, he became Huddersfield's co-caretaker manager alongside Narcís Pèlach, following the sacking of Danny Schofield, but departed in November 2022, when new manager Mark Fotheringham replaced him with Kenny Miller.

== Career ==
=== Grimsby Town ===
Born in Scunthorpe, Lincolnshire, Harsley started his career at the Grimsby Town youth system as a trainee and signed a professional contract on 16 July 1996. He moved to his hometown club Scunthorpe United 7 July 1997, having not appeared for Grimsby's first team.

=== Scunthorpe United ===
He broke into Scunthorpe's first team on 20 September 1997, aged 18, in a 1–0 defeat at Barnet, replacing Alejandro Calvo García as a late substitute. His first season was quite successful, as he made 15 appearances in all, scoring his first professional goal against Exeter City. His second season with the club was to prove far more prolific, however. He made 42 appearances as his club won promotion via the Third Division play-off final at the end of the 1998–99 season. The final itself took place at Wembley Stadium on his 21st birthday, where they defeated Leyton Orient 1–0. He was also given the club's Player of the Year award, the Ernie Storey Memorial Trophy.

Harsley was an ever-present for Scunthorpe's Second Division season. However, he could not help the club avoid relegation in 23rd place. He maintained his first-team spot in 2000–01, but was released by the club at the end of the season, subsequently joining Halifax Town on a free transfer on 1 July 2001.

=== Halifax Town ===
He spent one season at Halifax, which proved to be highly successful on an individual level, with Harsley ending up as their top scorer with twelve goals from fifty games; however, the team performed extremely poorly, and they were relegated out of the English Football League, a full nine points below Bristol Rovers. Throughout the campaign, he was linked with big money moves to First Division clubs, but nothing came of the speculation.

=== Northampton Town ===
Unwilling to play in the Conference, in June 2002 Harsley moved on to Northampton Town, again on a free transfer. He was highly productive throughout the 2002–03 season, making 51 appearances in all competitions and picking up the club's Player of the Year award. However, he suffered his third relegation in four years, as Northampton dropped out of the Second Division in last place, 11 points from safety.

=== Macclesfield Town ===
Although he started the 2003–04 season at Northampton, on 13 February 2004, he moved to Third Division rivals Macclesfield Town. He helped them to avoid relegation, before a signing a two-year contract in May 2004. A successful season followed in 2004–05, when his club made the play-offs, finishing ahead of eighth place Darlington on goal difference. Despite ever-present Harsley scoring in the play-off semi-final, Macclesfield were knocked out by Lincoln City. At the campaign's end, he was awarded the club's Player of the Year award. The following season proved to be a disappointing one, with Macclesfield again fighting relegation. Harsley made 45 league appearances, making 55 appearances in all competitions.

=== Port Vale ===
Harsley moved to League One Port Vale on a free transfer for the start of the 2006–07 season. A quiet season for both club and player, he made a total of forty appearances. Vale were relegated in the 2007–08 season. The club's misfortune on the pitch began to depress Harsley. Though the season had its high points for Harsley as he was captain of the side and also player of the year.

=== Chesterfield ===
At the end of the season, he was out of contract, and decided to move on after turning down a new deal at Vale Park and instead signed for Chesterfield. He failed to impress in 2008–09, making less than 20 appearances all told. By February 2009 he was put on the transfer list by manager Lee Richardson.

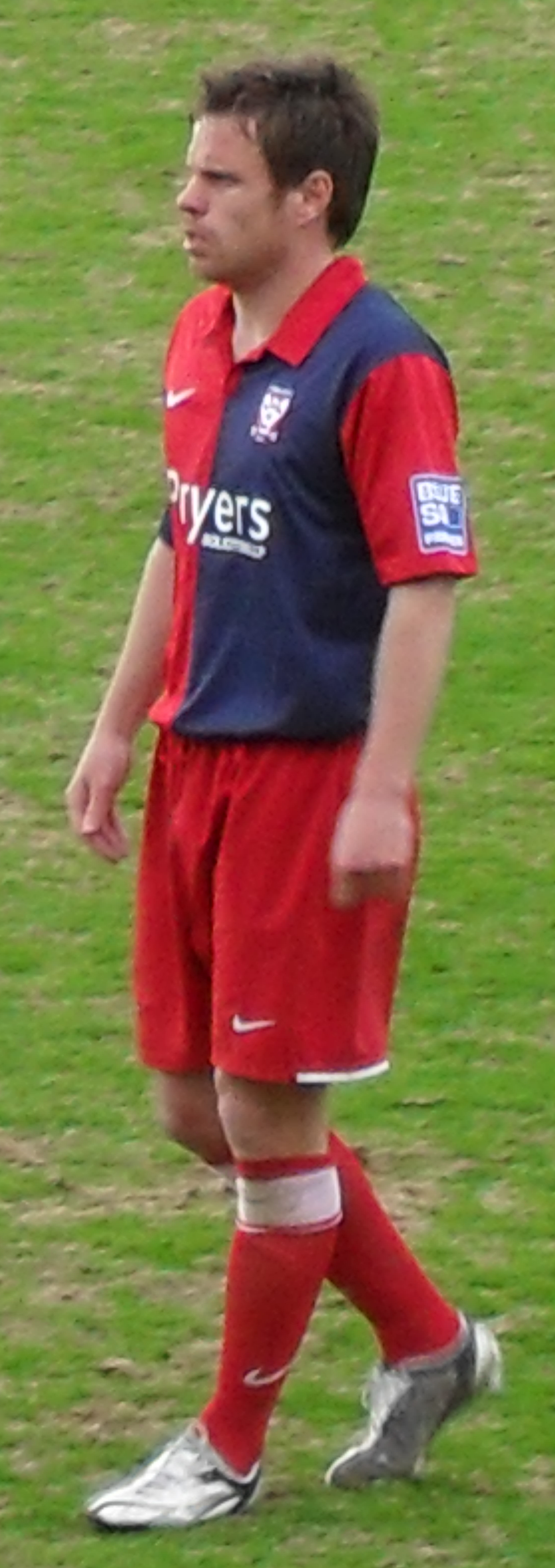
Harsley playing for York City in 2010

After starting the 2009–10 campaign just as poorly, he signed for Darlington on loan for three months on 26 November 2009, along with teammate Danny Hall. He played just three games for the club. He joined Conference Premier side York City on loan until the end of the season in March 2010, teaming up with his former Vale manager Martin Foyle. He made his first start in a 1–0 victory over Mansfield Town on 16 March, and scored his first York goal with the opener in a 4–0 victory over Grays Athletic. He finished the loan spell with nine appearances and one goal for York, helping them to a play-off position. Chesterfield announced that he would not be offered a new contract at the end of the season.

=== North Ferriby United ===
Harsley trialled with Northern Premier League Premier Division team North Ferriby United in July 2010, and he signed for them in August. He helped them to a play-off finish in 2010–11, though they lost out 2–0 to Colwyn Bay in the play-off semi-finals. He made 41 appearances in league and cup games before retiring in January 2012.

== Coaching career ==
Harsley was appointed as Centre of Excellence co-ordinator at Scunthorpe United in January 2011. In August 2015 he began working with Steve Spooner at the Birmingham City Academy. In October 2016, Harsley was appointed as Senior Professional Development Coach at Barnsley, with the responsibility of coaching the club's under-23 team. On 6 February 2018, Harsley was named as caretaker manager at Barnsley following Paul Heckingbottom's move to Leeds United. He managed the South Yorkshire derby between the "Tykes" and Sheffield Wednesday four days later, leading the team to a 1–1 draw at Oakwell. On 16 February, José Morais was named as Barnsley's new permanent manager. On 12 June 2018, Harsley was appointed EDS manager at Manchester City. He left when his contract expired in 2020.

Harsley rejoined Birmingham City, initially as lead professional development coach, took on some first-team duties when Lee Bowyer was appointed head coach in March 2021, and was confirmed as first-team development coach in June. After John Eustace took over from Bowyer, Harsley initially remained in post before leaving in August 2022 for Huddersfield Town, where he was appointed one of two assistants to head coach Danny Schofield. Following Schofield's sacking on 14 September 2022, Harsley became co-caretaker manager alongside Narcís Pèlach. Harsley reverted to his coaching role once Mark Fotheringham was appointed as manager 14 days later. On 27 November 2022, it was announced that Harsley had left Huddersfield after Fotheringham had brought in Kenny Miller to be his new co-assistant coach.

== Career statistics ==
=== Playing statistics ===
Appearances and goals by club, season and competition
Club	Season	League			FA Cup		League Cup		Other		Total	
Club	Season	Division	Apps	Goals	Apps	Goals	Apps	Goals	Apps	Goals	Apps	Goals
Scunthorpe United	1997–98	Third Division	15	1	0	0	0	0	0	0	15	1
Scunthorpe United	1998–99	Third Division	34	0	3	1	2	0	3 (Note: 1 appearance in the Football League Trophy and 2 appearances in the play-offs.)	0	42	1
Scunthorpe United	1999–2000	Second Division	46	3	1	0	2	0	2 (Note: Appearance(s) in the Football League Trophy.)	0	51	3
Scunthorpe United	2000–01	Third Division	33	1	2	0	2	0	1	0	38	1
Scunthorpe United	Total		128	5	6	1	6	0	6	0	146	6
Halifax Town	2001–02	Third Division	45	11	3	1	1	0	1	0	50	12
Northampton Town	2002–03	Second Division	45	2	3	1	1	0	2	0	51	3
Northampton Town	2003–04	Third Division	14	0	2	0	1	0	2	0	19	0
Northampton Town	Total		59	2	5	1	2	0	4	0	70	3
Macclesfield Town	2003–04	Third Division	16	2	—		—		—		16	2
Macclesfield Town	2004–05	League Two	46	3	3	0	1	0	5 (Note: 3 appearances in the Football League Trophy and 2 appearances in the play-offs.)	1	55	4
Macclesfield Town	2005–06	League Two	45	6	2	0	2	0	6	1	55	7
Macclesfield Town	Total		107	11	5	0	3	0	11	2	126	13
Port Vale	2006–07	League One	32	1	2	0	4	0	2	0	40	1
Port Vale	2007–08	League One	41	5	1	0	0	0	0	0	42	5
Port Vale	Total		73	6	3	0	4	0	2	0	82	6
Chesterfield	2008–09	League Two	17	1	1	0	1	0	0	0	19	1
Chesterfield	2009–10	League Two	3	0	0	0	1	0	1	0	5	0
Chesterfield	Total		20	1	1	0	2	0	1	0	24	1
Darlington (loan)	2009–10	League Two	3	0	0	0	0	0	0	0	3	0
York City (loan)	2009–10	Conference Premier	9	1	—		—		—		9	1
North Ferriby United	2010–11	Northern Premier Division	32	4	4	0	—		5	2	41	6
North Ferriby United	2011–12	Northern Premier Division	24	3	2	0	—		6	1	32	4
North Ferriby United	Total		56	7	6	0	0	0	11	3	73	10
Career total			500	44	29	3	18	0	36	5	583	52

=== Managerial statistics ===
Managerial record by team and tenure
Team	From	To	Record					Ref
Team	From	To	P	W	D	L	Win %	Ref
Barnsley (caretaker)	6 February 2018	16 February 2018	1	0	1	0	0.0	
Huddersfield Town (caretaker)	14 September 2022	28 September 2022	1	1	0	0	100.0	
Total			2	1	1	0	50.0	—

== Honours ==
Scunthorpe United

- Football League Third Division play-offs: 1999

Individual

- Scunthorpe United Player of the Year: 1998–99
- Northampton Town Player of the Year: 2002–03
- Macclesfield Town Player of the Year: 2004–05
- Port Vale Player of the Year: 2007–08
