= Peter Wright (footballer, born 1982) =

English footballer

Personal information
- Full name: Peter David Wright
- Date of birth: 15 August 1982 (age 44)
- Place of birth: Preston, England
- Height: 5 ft 8 in (1.73 m)
- Position: Forward

Youth career
- –1998: Blackburn Rovers
- 1998–2000: Newcastle United

Senior career*
Years	Team	Apps	(Gls)
2000–2001	Newcastle United	0	(0)
2001–2002	Halifax Town	14	(0)
2002–2003	Burscough		
2003	Southport	19	(2)
2003–2004	Northwich Victoria	22	(4)
2004–2005	Altrincham	11	(2)
2005	Bamber Bridge		
2005–2006	Chorley	41	(18)
2006–2007	Mossley	19	(8)
2007	Kendal Town		
2007	Fleetwood Town		
2010	Bamber Bridge		
2010	Kendal Town		
2010–2011	Bamber Bridge		
2011	Ashton United	12	(4)
2011–2012	Kendal Town	4	(0)
2012–2013	Leek Town	27	(15)
2013	Nantwich Town	0	(0)
2013–2015	Nelson	77	(52)
- * Club domestic league appearances and goals as of 09:51, 17 April 2016 (UTC)

Peter David Wright (born 15 August 1982) is an English professional footballer who played in the Football League, as a forward for Newcastle United and Halifax Town.

== Career ==
Wright started his career in the youth system at Blackburn Rovers before transferring to Newcastle United. In 2000, he signed his first professional contract with the FA Premier League side, featuring predominantly in the reserves. In the summer of 2001, Wright joined Football League Third Division side Halifax Town on a free transfer. It was at Halifax where he made his professional debut in a 2–1 win over Lincoln City, replacing Craig Midgley as a substitute. He spent one season at The Shay making 17 appearances in all competitions. Halifax were relegated to the Football Conference and Wright then dropped into non-league with Northern Premier League side Burscough. He spent one season with Burscough captaining them to lift the 2003 FA Trophy Final, with victory over Tamworth at Villa Park. He transferred to fellow Northern Premier League side Southport for a short spell before being handed the opportunity to move to Conference National side Northwich Victoria in November 2003 for an undisclosed fee, reported to be £3,000. He scored four goals in 22 games as Northwich finished bottom of the table.

Wright signed for Conference North side Altrincham in June 2004 on a free transfer after his contract with Northwich expired. He started the season in the first team before fracturing his eye socket, which kept him out of action for a prolonged spell. In January 2005, Wright asked to leave the club after making 14 appearances scoring twice. He dropped back into the Northern Premier League joining Bamber Bridge, however, he could not save the club from relegation. In the summer of 2005 he joined Northern Premier League First Division side Chorley, finishing as the club's top goalscorer with 22 goals. In September 2006, Mossley manager Jason Beckford brought Wright to the Northern Premier League Premier Division side, where he made a total of 25 appearances scoring nine goals. In March 2007 he transferred to league rivals Kendal Town on a free transfer. Wright also had a brief spell playing for NPL Premier Division side Fleetwood Town under dual registration. In December 2007, Wright was banned from football by the Lancashire FA for two years after striking a referee whilst playing for Ribbleton Rangers in a five-a-side tournament staged in Preston, Lancashire. He returned to football in January 2010, re-signing for NPL First Division North side Bamber Bridge. In March 2010, he moved up a division and re-joined NPL Premier Division side Kendal Town. His stay at the club however was short and he quickly re-signed for Bamber Bridge. In the summer of 2011, he joined NPL Premier Division side Ashton United.

In November 2011, Wright joined Kendal Town for the third time in his career. In the summer of 2012, Wright joined NPL Premier Division side Leek Town on a free transfer. He scored 21 goals as the club finished in mid-table. In the summer of 2013, Wright was on the move again this time to NPL Premier Division rivals Nantwich Town. His spell at the club was short as Wright was on the move again in August 2013, signing for North West Counties Football League First Division side Nelson by manager Mark Fell. He linked up with Fell for the second time in his career having previously been coached by him at Chorley in 2006, when Fell was in Paul Lodge's coaching setup. Wright had a prolific goalscoring record in his first season at the club finishing as top scorer with 38 goals in 37 games in all competitions, as Nelson finished as champions gaining promotion to the North West Counties Football League Premier Division. This goal tally included an impressive five hat-tricks, with three of these coming in consecutive games in March 2014. In May 2014, Wright extended his stay with Nelson signing a one-year contract. In October 2015, he left Nelson after two years at the club and having scored 59 goals in 91 appearances.

== Personal life ==
After finishing his professional career, Wright went on to work as a plumber full-time. He has three children with his former partner Rachel Livesey, Lewis, Jessica and Sophie. In January 2014, he helped to deliver his second child Jessica at their home in Lostock Hall, Lancashire. Less than 12 hours later he scored a last minute winner for Nelson in a 4–3 win over Daisy Hill.

== Career statistics ==
As of match played 3 October 2015.

Club statistics
Club	Season	League			FA Cup		League Cup		Other		Total	
Club	Season	Division	Apps	Goals	Apps	Goals	Apps	Goals	Apps	Goals	Apps	Goals
Newcastle United	2000–01	FA Premier League	0	0	0	0	0	0	—		0	0
Halifax Town	2001–02	Third Division	14	0	2	0	1	0	0	0	17	0
Southport	2003–04	NPL Premier Division	19	2	1	0	—		0	0	20	2
Northwich Victoria	2003–04	Conference National	22	4	0	0	—		1 (Note: Appearance in FA Trophy)	0	23	4
Altrincham	2004–05	Conference North	11	2	2	0	—		2 (Note: 1 appearance in FA Trophy, 1 appearance in Conference League Cup)	0	15	2
Chorley	2005–06	NPL Division One	41	18	4	0	—		5 (Note: 1 appearance and 1 goal in FA Trophy, 1 appearance and 1 goal in Northern Premier League Challenge Cup, 1 appearance and 1 goal in Northern Premier League Chairman's Cup, 2 appearances and 1 goal in Lancashire FA Challenge Trophy)	4	50	22
Mossley	2006–07	NPL Premier Division	19	8	1	0	—		5 (Note: 2 appearances in FA Trophy, 1 appearance in Northern Premier League Challenge Cup, 2 appearances and 1 goal in Manchester Premier Cup)	1	25	9
Ashton United	2011–12	NPL Premier Division	12	4	2	2	—		3 (Note: 1 appearance and 1 goal in FA Trophy, 1 appearance in Peter Swales Shield, 1 appearance in Manchester Premier Cup)	1	17	7
Kendal Town	2011–12	NPL Premier Division	4	0	0	0	—		3 (Note: 1 appearance in Lancashire FA Challenge Trophy, 2 appearances in Northern Premier League Challenge Cup)	0	7	0
Leek Town	2012–13	NPL Division One South	27	15	3	3	—		5 (Note: 3 appearances and 1 goal in FA Trophy, 2 appearances and 2 goals in Northern Premier League Challenge Cup)	3	35	21
Nantwich Town	2013–14	NPL Premier Division	0	0	0	0	—		0	0	0	0
Nelson	2013–14	NWCFL First Division	29	33	—		—		8 (Note: 2 appearances and 1 goal in FA Vase, 3 appearances and 1 goal in Lancashire FA Challenge Trophy, 1 appearance in NWCFL League Challenge Cup, 2 appearances and 3 goals in NWCFL First Division Challenge Cup)	5	37	38
Nelson	2014–15	NWCFL Premier Division	36	16	1	1	—		3 (Note: One appearance in FA Vase, one in NWCFL League Challenge Cup, one appearance and one goal in Lancashire FA Challenge Trophy)	1	40	18
Nelson	2015–16	NWCFL Premier Division	12	3	1	0	—		1 (Note: Appearance in FA Vase)	0	14	3
Nelson	Total		77	52	2	1	—		12	6	91	59
Career total			256	105	17	6	1	0	36	15	300	125

== Honours ==
Burscough

- FA Trophy: 2002–03

Nelson

- North West Counties Football League First Division: 2013–14
