= Sergio Ommel =

Dutch footballer (born 1977)

Personal information
- Full name: Sergio Melvin Ommel
- Date of birth: 2 September 1977 (age 49)
- Place of birth: The Hague, Netherlands
- Height: 1.90 m (6 ft 3 in)
- Position: Forward

Team information
- Current team: Fc Weesp
- Number: 9

Youth career
- 1982–1987: DIO Groningen
- 1987–1993: GVAV Rapiditas
- 1993–1997: FC Groningen

Senior career*
Years	Team	Apps	(Gls)
1997–1999	FC Groningen	33	(6)
1999–2000	Telstar	59	(15)
2000–2001	KR	8	(0)
2001–2002	Bristol Rovers	23	(8)
2002–2004	Stormvogels Telstar	60	(14)
2005–2006	APOP Kyniras Peyia		(2)
2006–2009	Quick Boys		
2009–2010	Ter Leede		
2010–2011	SV Huizen		
2011–2012	FC Lisse	21	(5)
2012–	ARC	19	(5)
- * Club domestic league appearances and goals

Sergio Ommel (born 2 September 1977 in The Hague) is a Dutch footballer, who is a professional player, who currently plays for ARC Alphen aan den Rijn.

== Career ==
Ommel's first senior club was FC Groningen, and from there he moved to Telstar. He joined Icelandic side KR in 2000, for whom he played in the qualifying rounds of the UEFA Champions League, before moving to England to join Bristol Rovers in November 2001. He remained in Bristol until the end of the 2001–02 season, when he traveled back to his home nation and signed for the newly formed Stormvogels Telstar, who were created following the merger of Stormvogels with his old club Telstar. From there he joined amateur club Quick Boys, before moving to Ter Leede in 2007. Next club was S.V. Huizen and for FC Lisse. The forward, was than 2012 signed by ARC Alphen aan den Rijn from amateur side FC Lisse.
