= Billy Beall =

English football defender

Personal information
- Full name: Matthew John Beall
- Date of birth: 4 December 1977 (age 48)
- Place of birth: Enfield, England
- Position: Midfielder

Youth career
- 1994: Norwich City

Senior career*
Years	Team	Apps	(Gls)
1996–1998	Cambridge United	82	(7)
1998–2002	Leyton Orient	84	(3)
2000	→ Dover Athletic (loan)		
2001	Cambridge City		
2002	Farnborough Town		
- * Club domestic league appearances and goals

Matthew John Beall (born 4 December 1977) is an English former footballer who played in the Football League for Cambridge United and Leyton Orient.
