= Jamie Victory =

English footballer

Personal information
- Date of birth: 14 November 1975 (age 50)
- Place of birth: Hackney, London, England
- Position: Left back

Senior career*
Years	Team	Apps	(Gls)
1994–1995	West Ham United	0	(0)
1995–1996	AFC Bournemouth	16	(1)
1996–2007	Cheltenham Town	258	(22)
Total		274	(23)
- * Club domestic league appearances and goals

Jamie Victory (born 14 November 1975) is an English former footballer. He played as a defender and was last attached to Cheltenham Town, where he wore the number three shirt and usually acted as a left full back. He was born in Hackney.

== Career ==
Early in his career he spent time at West Ham United's youth system. He signed on at Cheltenham Town on a free transfer from AFC Bournemouth in 1996.

At the start of the 2006–07 season, Victory had a testimonial game featuring the current Cheltenham Town team against a team of Cheltenham Town legends including Julian Alsop, Mike Duff, Martin Devaney, and Steve Book among others.

In May 2007, he was released by Cheltenham after eleven years with the club, and in February 2008 he retired from professional football, as the result of a recurrent pelvic injury and is currently working at the radiography department at Gloucestershire Royal Hospital.

== Honours ==
Cheltenham Town

- Football League Third Division play-offs: 2002
