= Mark Jules =

English footballer

Personal information
- Date of birth: 5 September 1971 (age 55)
- Place of birth: Bradford, England
- Positions: Left-back; winger

Youth career
- –1990: Bradford City

Senior career*
Years	Team	Apps	(Gls)
1990–1991	Bradford City	0	(0)
1991–1993	Scarborough	77	(16)
1993–1999	Chesterfield	186	(4)
1999–2002	Halifax Town	97	(1)
2002–?	Alfreton Town		
- * Club domestic league appearances and goals

Mark Jules (born 5 September 1971) is an English former footballer who played as a left-back or winger.
