= Paul Stoneman =

English footballer

Personal information
- Date of birth: 26 February 1973 (age 53)
- Place of birth: Whitley Bay, England
- Position: Defender

Team information
- Current team: West Allotment Celtic

Senior career*
Years	Team	Apps	(Gls)
1991–1994	Blackpool	43	(0)
1994–1995	Colchester United	3	(1)
1995–2005	Halifax Town	174	(17)
2005–2006	Harrogate Town	28	(0)
2006	Wakefield	27	(1)
2006–2008	Bridlington Town	?	(?)
2008–2011	Bradford Park Avenue	3	(0)

Managerial career
- 2007–2008: Bridlington Town (player-manager)
- * Club domestic league appearances and goals as of 00:16, 11 January 2008 (UTC)

Paul Stoneman (born 26 February 1973) is an English professional footballer, who plays for semi-professional club West Allotment Celtic. He plays as a defender.

Stoneman began his career with Blackpool in 1991. After three seasons with the Seasiders he joined Colchester United, with whom he spent another season.

In 1995, he signed for Halifax Town. He went on to spend ten years with the Shaymen, making 174 league appearances and scoring seventeen goals. In 2003, Stoneman became the club's youth-team coach. He left Halifax in the summer of 2005 to join Harrogate Town, and later played for Wakefield before being named player-assistant manager at Bridlington in January 2007. In January 2008 he was relieved of his duties at Bridlington and subsequently signed as a player for Bradford Park Avenue a week later.

== Honours ==
Blackpool

- Division Four play-off winner: 1991-92

Halifax Town

- Conference champion: 1998
