= Neil Gough =

English footballer (born 1981)

Personal information
- Full name: Neil Gough
- Date of birth: 1 September 1981 (age 45)
- Place of birth: Harlow, England
- Position: Forward

Senior career*
Years	Team	Apps	(Gls)
1998–2003	Leyton Orient	26	(1)
2001–2002	→ Chelmsford City (loan)	12	(7)
2002	Hampton & Richmond Borough	2	(2)
2002	Heybridge Swifts	11	(6)
2002–2003	Hereford United	0	(0)
2003	Barry Town	4	(3)
2003–2004	Chelmsford City	7	(3)
2004	St Albans City	10	(2)
2010 - 2011	Seaham Red Star	15	(11)
Total		87	(35)
- * Club domestic league appearances and goals

Neil Gough (born 1 September 1981) is an English former professional footballer who played in the Football League as a forward. He is first team coach at Basildon United Football Club.
