= Ian Fitzpatrick =

English footballer

Personal information
- Full name: Ian Matthew Fitzpatrick
- Date of birth: 22 September 1980 (age 46)
- Place of birth: Manchester, England
- Height: 5 ft 9 in (1.75 m)
- Position: Forward

Senior career*
Years	Team	Apps	(Gls)
1995–1997	England National School	18	(6)
1999–2000	Manchester United	?	(?)
1999–2000	→ Fortune FC (loan)	?	(?)
2000–2003	Halifax Town	87	(28)
2004–2005	Shrewsbury Town	27	(2)
2004	→ Forest Green Rovers (loan)	5	(0)
2005–2006	Droylsden	49	(14)
2006–2007	Radcliffe Borough	41	(24)
2007–2008	Ashton United	39	(19)
Total		268	(91)
- * Club domestic league appearances and goals

Ian Matthew Fitzpatrick (born 22 September 1980) in Manchester, England, is an English retired professional footballer who played as a striker for Manchester United, Halifax Town and Shrewsbury Town in the Football League. F.A. National School Graduate, E.S.F.A, England U15-U18 (18 Caps).

He is the younger brother of former Blackburn Rovers and Hartlepool United midfielder Lee Fitzpatrick.

Ian now works as a Premiership Academy Coach at Manchester City Football Club.
