= Matthew Clarke (footballer, born 1980) =

English footballer (born 1980)

Matt Clarke
Personal information
- Full name: Matthew Paul Clarke
- Date of birth: 18 December 1980 (age 45)
- Place of birth: Leeds, England
- Height: 6 ft 3 in (1.91 m)
- Position: Defender

Senior career*
Years	Team	Apps	(Gls)
1998–1999	Wolverhampton Wanderers	0	(0)
1999–2002	Halifax Town	78	(2)
2000	→ Gainsborough Trinity (loan)		
2000	→ Frickley Athletic (loan)		
2002–2006	Darlington	169	(13)
2006–2010	Bradford City	88	(4)
2006	→ Darlington (loan)	2	(0)
2010–2011	Hibernians		
2011–2012	Msida Saint-Joseph	17	(1)
2012–2013	Marsaxlokk		
2013	Guiseley	1	(0)
- * Club domestic league appearances and goals as of 4 November 2013

Matthew Paul Clarke (born 18 December 1980) is an English former professional footballer who played as a defender.

He started his professional career in 1998 with Wolverhampton Wanderers but was released after his first full season as a pro and without making a first team appearance. He went on to play for Halifax Town, from where he spent short loans at Gainsborough Trinity and Frickley Athletic, and Darlington before signing for Bradford City in 2006. He remained with The Bantams until 2010 before joining Maltese Premier League side Hibernians; during a three-year spell in Malta Clarke also played for Msida Saint-Joseph and Marsaxlokk. After his return to England he had a short spell with Conference North club Guiseley.

== Playing career ==
=== Early career ===
Clarke started his career as a trainee with Wolverhampton Wanderers but never made a first-team appearance. He signed for Halifax Town in 1999. In 2000, he spent short loans at Gainsborough Trinity and Frickley Athletic. He played 78 times and scored twice for Halifax.

=== Darlington ===
He then signed for Darlington in July 2002 following a trial at Manchester City the previous season. He was set to leave Darlington in May 2005 but following talks with manager David Hodgson he stayed on and was rewarded with the captaincy.

=== Bradford City ===
He signed for Bradford City in 2006 to replace Damion Stewart after playing 169 league games and scoring 13 goals for Darlington. He was sent off on his debut for City during a Football League Trophy game defeat to Scunthorpe United. He rejoined the Quakers on a month's loan during the 2006–07 season after an injury-plagued start to his Bantams career. His loan deal lasted two games because of an injury caused by driving before he returned to Bradford, for whom he made his league debut on 5 December 2006. He played just ten games in his first season for Bradford City and made his first prolonged spell in the first team during the following season when he displaced Mark Bower.

He scored his first goal for Bradford City – and first for 21 months – in a 2–0 win over Accrington Stanley on 1 January 2008. He made his first prolonged run of games in the Bradford team until he suffered a medial ligament injury in training, which allowed loan defender TJ Moncur to make his debut and play throughout February and March 2008. He missed the rest of the 2007–08 season because of the injury, but signed a new contract in April 2008, which kept him at Bradford City for the following season.

He started the following season, helping Bradford to two clean sheets in their first three league games, before he suffered another injury, after half-an-hour of a 3–2 defeat to Aldershot Town. City were 1–0 ahead when Clarke went off with a calf injury which was due to keep him out for up to a month. However, after missing a Football League Trophy derby game with Leeds United, he made a quick recovery playing in City's next league game. He was sent off after only 12 minutes of a 3–1 victory against Grimsby Town on 24 October 2008. In March 2009, Clarke and striker Barry Conlon were both dropped for a game with Exeter City and punished following a breach of club discipline. Manager Stuart McCall said: "It's an internal matter and has been dealt with in the dressing room." In the following game, Clarke scored City's equalising goal, but they fell to a 4–1 defeat to AFC Bournemouth, which prompted McCall to offer to resign if the side did not reach the play-offs.

Clarke was released from his contract with Bradford City at the end of the 2009–10 season.

=== Move to the Maltese League ===
That summer he moved to Malta to sign for Maltese Premier League side Hibernians. At the end of the season he moved clubs and joined Msida Saint-Joseph where he scored once in 17 appearances. In the summer of 2012 he signed for Marsaxlokk and eventually left the club and the country the end of the 2012–13 season.

Despite the suggestion on Grimsby Town's website that Clarke had joined the Conference National club on trial in early July 2013, joint manager Rob Scott said he was just training with Grimsby as a favour. He signed for Guiseley of the Conference North on 13 September, and left a few weeks later having made just one appearance.

== Personal life ==
He is the twin brother of fellow footballer Chris Clarke.
