= Craig Middleton =

English footballer

Personal information
- Full name: Craig Dean Middleton
- Date of birth: 10 September 1970 (age 56)
- Place of birth: Nuneaton, England
- Position: Midfielder

Senior career*
Years	Team	Apps	(Gls)
1989–1993	Coventry City	3	(0)
1993–1996	Cambridge United	59	(10)
1996–2000	Cardiff City	118	(8)
2000	→ Plymouth Argyle (loan)	6	(2)
2000–2002	Halifax Town	76	(8)
- * Club domestic league appearances and goals

Craig Dean Middleton (born 10 September 1970) is an English retired football midfielder.

Middleton began his career at Coventry City, alongside his twin brother Lee, before moving to Cambridge United in 1993. He made a number of appearances in his first year but missed the whole of the following season, 1994–95. He did manage to return to the side but a shoulder injury towards the end of the season meant he was released by the club in 1996. He signed for Cardiff City and quickly became a first team regular and would be a vital part of the Cardiff team for the next three years before falling out of favour and, after a short loan spell at Plymouth Argyle, left to join Halifax Town.
