= Steve Kerrigan (footballer) =

Scottish footballer (born 1972)

Personal information
- Full name: Steven John Kerrigan
- Date of birth: 9 October 1972 (age 54)
- Place of birth: Bellshill, Scotland
- Position: Forward

Youth career
- Newmains Juveniles

Senior career*
Years	Team	Apps	(Gls)
1992–1994	Albion Rovers	53	(22)
1994–1995	Clydebank	30	(2)
1995–1996	Stranraer	21	(8)
1996–1998	Ayr United	33	(17)
1998–2000	Shrewsbury Town	76	(26)
2000–2002	Halifax Town	78	(29)
2002–2003	Stirling Albion	14	(5)
2003–2004	Arbroath	6	(0)
2004	Berwick Rangers	6	(0)
2004–2005	Stenhousemuir	16	(0)
Total		333	(109)

Managerial career
- 2009–2010: Camelon Juniors
- 2016: Arthurlie
- 2018: Bo'ness United
- 2019: Linlithgow Rose
- 2022: Rosyth
- * Club domestic league appearances and goals as of 17:23, 27 January 2018 (UTC)

Steve Kerrigan (born 9 October 1972) is a Scottish former professional footballer who played for several clubs in the Scottish Football League and the Football League in the 1990s and 2000s.

He had various spells coaching at Junior level since ending his playing career, with the first of his managerial stints at Camelon Juniors in July 2009, succeeding Greig Denham. A short spell as boss of Arthurlie followed in 2016.

In January 2018, Kerrigan became manager at Bo'ness United having joined the club as assistant to Allan McGonigal in September 2017. In 2022 Steve joined Greig Denham at East of Scotland side Rosyth as his Assistant Manager.
