= Paul Campbell (footballer) =

English footballer

Personal information
- Full name: Paul Andrew Campbell
- Date of birth: 29 January 1980 (age 46)
- Place of birth: Middlesbrough, England
- Height: 6 ft 1 in (1.85 m)
- Position: Midfielder

Youth career
- –1998: Darlington

Senior career*
Years	Team	Apps	(Gls)
1998–2003	Darlington	61	(6)
- * Club domestic league appearances and goals

Paul Andrew Campbell (born 29 January 1980) is an English former professional footballer who played as a midfielder in the Football League for Darlington.
