= Chris Clarke (footballer, born 1980) =

English footballer

Personal information
- Full name: Christopher Edward Clarke
- Date of birth: 18 December 1980 (age 45)
- Place of birth: Leeds, England
- Height: 6 ft 3 in (1.91 m)
- Position: Defender

Youth career
- ?–1999: Wolverhampton Wanderers

Senior career*
Years	Team	Apps	(Gls)
1999–2002	Halifax Town	51	(1)
2002–2004	Blackpool	46	(2)
2004	Cambridge United	1	(0)
2004	York City	5	(0)
2004–2005	Halifax Town	4	(0)
2005	→ Leigh RMI (loan)	4	(0)
2005–2006	Guiseley	21	(2)
2006–?	Bradford Park Avenue	?	(?)
- * Club domestic league appearances and goals as of 18:35, 12 June 2011 (UTC)

Christopher Edward Clarke (born 18 December 1980) is an English footballer who plays as a defender.

== Career ==
Born in Leeds, West Yorkshire, Clarke started his career with the Wolverhampton Wanderers youth system alongside his twin brother Matthew and after being released by the club the pair signed for Third Division outfit Halifax Town in July 1999. He left the club in February 2002 after signing for Second Division side Blackpool on a two-and-a-half-year contract with the option of an additional year for a fee of £120,000 plus a sell-on clause. Clarke made his debut in a 3–0 victory at Cambridge United on 26 February. He scored Blackpool's second goal with a header in the 2002 Football League Trophy Final at the Millennium Stadium, which the team went on to win 4–1 against Cambridge. He joined Cambridge of the Third Division on a free transfer after signing a contract until the end of the 2003–04 season on 25 March 2004.

After training with York City he signed for the newly-relegated Conference National side on a one-year contract on 16 July. After making five appearances for the club. He was allowed to leave the club on a free transfer on 22 October. He subsequently re-signed for former club Halifax, now in the Conference. He made his debut in a 3–1 defeat to Chester City in an FA Cup second round game on 4 December. Having made three appearances for Halifax, Clarke joined Conference rivals Leigh RMI on a one-month loan on 18 February 2005. He was described by manager Steve Bleasdale as a "key acquisition" and after making four appearances he returned to Halifax. Having made another three appearances for Halifax he was released at the end of the 2004–05 season.

He signed for Northern Premier League Premier Division side Guiseley during the summer. Clarke left the club early in the 2006–07 season to sign for Northern Premier League First Division side Bradford Park Avenue. He played for Park Avenue in their 3–0 defeat to Eastwood Town in the play-off semi-final in April 2007.

== Career statistics ==
As of 24 October 2006.

Appearances and goals by club, season and competition
Club	Season	League^{[A]}		FA Cup		League Cup		Other^{[B]}		Total	
Club	Season	Apps	Goals	Apps	Goals	Apps	Goals	Apps	Goals	Apps	Goals
Halifax Town	1999–2000	1	0	0	0	0	0	0	0	1	0
Halifax Town	2000–01	26	1	0	0	1	0	1	0	28	1
Halifax Town	2001–02	24	0	3	0	1	0	0	0	28	0
Halifax Town	Total	51	1	3	0	2	0	1	0	57	1
Blackpool	2001–02	11	0	0	0	0	0	1	1	12	1
Blackpool	2002–03	17	1	3	0	0	0	1	0	21	1
Blackpool	2003–04	18	1	3	0	3	0	2	0	26	1
Blackpool	Total	46	2	6	0	3	0	4	1	59	3
Cambridge United	2003–04	1	0	0	0	0	0	0	0	1	0
York City	2004–05	5	0	0	0	0	0	0	0	5	0
Halifax Town	2004–05	4	0	1	0	0	0	1	0	6	0
Leigh RMI (loan)	2004–05	4	0	0	0	0	0	0	0	4	0
Guiseley	2005–06	14	2	0	0	0	0	0	0	14	2
Guiseley	2006–07	7	1	0	0	0	0	0	0	7	1
Guiseley	Total	21	2	0	0	0	0	0	0	21	2
Career total		132	5	10	0	5	0	6	1	153	6

== Honours ==
Blackpool

- Football League Trophy: 2001–02

== Footnotes ==
A. The "League" column constitutes appearances and goals (including those as a substitute) in the Football League, Football Conference and Northern Premier League.
B. The "Other" column constitutes appearances and goals (including those as a substitute) in the FA Trophy and Football League Trophy.
