= Lee Hodges (footballer, born 1978) =

English footballer and manager

Personal information
- Date of birth: 2 March 1978 (age 48)
- Place of birth: Plaistow, London, England
- Height: 5 ft 5 in (1.65 m)
- Position: Midfielder

Team information
- Current team: Herongate Athletic

Youth career
- Arsenal
- West Ham United

Senior career*
| Years | Team | Apps | (Gls) |
| 1995–1999 | West Ham United | 3 | (0) |
| 1996 | → Exeter City (loan) | 17 | (0) |
| 1997 | → Leyton Orient (loan) | 3 | (0) |
| 1997–1998 | → Plymouth Argyle (loan) | 9 | (0) |
| 1998 | → Ipswich Town (loan) | 4 | (0) |
| 1999 | → Southend United (loan) | 10 | (1) |
| 1999–2002 | Scunthorpe United | 113 | (20) |
| 2002–2003 | Rochdale | 7 | (0) |
| 2003 | → Bristol Rovers (loan) | 8 | (0) |
| 2003–2004 | Bristol Rovers | 13 | (2) |
| 2004–2006 | Thurrock | | |
| 2006–2008 | Billericay Town | | |
| 2008 | AFC Hornchurch | | |
| 2008–2009 | East Thurrock United | | |
| 2009 | Billericay Town | | |
| 2009–2010 | Tilbury | | |
| 2010 | East Thurrock United | | |
| 2010–2011 | Thurrock | | |
| 2021– | Herongate Athletic | 0 | (0) |

International career
| | England U16 | 9 | (0) |

Managerial career
- 2011–2012: Aveley
- * Club domestic league appearances and goals

Lee Hodges (born 2 March 1978) is an English footballer who plays as a midfielder for Herongate Athletic. He made three appearances in the Premier League for West Ham United and made 184 appearances in the Football League for Exeter City, Leyton Orient, Plymouth Argyle, Ipswich Town, Southend United, Scunthorpe United, Rochdale and Bristol Rovers.

== Career ==
Hodges played for Arsenal as a schoolboy and was capped nine times by England at under-16 level. He went on to join West Ham United and signed his first professional contract in March 1995. He was loaned out to Exeter City in September 1996, where he made his senior debut against Brighton & Hove Albion, and played in 17 league matches during his three months with the club. Shortly after returning to West Ham, he joined on loan Leyton Orient and made three league appearances in March 1997. Hodges moved to Plymouth Argyle on a two-month loan in November and appeared in ten matches, nine of which were in the league. He made his debut for West Ham in January 1998 and appeared in another four matches that season. Hodges played in his last match for West Ham during the 1998–99 season and subsequently went on loan to Ipswich Town, making four appearances, and Southend United. He scored his first goal in professional football during his time with Southend, the second against Barnet in May 1999.

In the summer of 1999, Hodges was transferred to Scunthorpe United for an initial fee of £50,000, having rejected West Ham's offer of a new contract in order to play more first team football. He spent three years with Scunthorpe, scoring 20 goals in 113 league matches. He was included in the PFA Third Division Team of the Year in 2001 and again the following year. He was released in the summer of 2002, and went on to sign a two-year contract with Rochdale. Having made eight appearances in all competitions for Rochdale, he joined Bristol Rovers on loan in March 2003 until the end of the season. He signed a two-year contract with Rovers in May, Hodges played in 21 league matches for the club, scoring twice, before being released at the start of the 2004–05 season and subsequently moved into non-league football with Thurrock. Two years later, Hodges joined Billericay Town.

Hodges left Billericay in 2008 to sign for AFC Hornchurch, however, his time with the club was brief and later that year he was playing for East Thurrock United. He returned to Billericay in March 2009 to take up a role as player-assistant manager. He left the club at the end of the 2008–09 season and went on to sign for Tilbury as player-coach. Hodges briefly returned to East Thurrock in the same role, and then rejoined Thurrock as a member of their coaching staff.

Hodges was appointed manager of Aveley in November 2011, however, his reign was brief. Hodges resigned after less than three months in charge, citing work and family commitments as the cause.

In June 2021, Essex Olympian League Division One club Herongate Athletic announced the signing of Hodges.

== Honours ==
Individual

- PFA Team of the Year: 2000–01 Third Division, 2001–02 Third Division
