= Leon Drysdale =

English footballer

Personal information
- Full name: Leon Anthony Drysdale
- Date of birth: 3 February 1981 (age 45)
- Place of birth: Walsall, England
- Position: Defender

Senior career*
Years	Team	Apps	(Gls)
1998–2004	Shrewsbury Town	66	(1)
2003–2004	→ Nuneaton Borough (loan)	10	(0)
2004–2005	AFC Telford United	23	(5)
2005	Cambridge United	0	(0)
2006	Hednesford Town	5	(0)
- * Club domestic league appearances and goals as of 12:38, 8 January 2011 (UTC)

Leon Anthony Drysdale (born 3 February 1981) is an English former footballer who played as a defender for Shrewsbury Town in The Football League.

He made his debut for the Shrews on 20 April 1999 in the Third Division clash with Rotherham United that ended in a 2–3 defeat at Gay Meadow.

He left the Shropshire side after their delegation, spells at AFC Telford United and Nuneaton Borough (loan) followed. He has since retired and works as a firefighter in the West Midlands.
