= Mark Sheeran =

English footballer

Personal information
- Full name: Mark John Sheeran
- Date of birth: 9 September 1982 (age 44)
- Place of birth: Newcastle upon Tyne, England
- Height: 6 ft 0 in (1.83 m)
- Position: Striker

Senior career*
Years	Team	Apps	(Gls)
2001–2004	Darlington	32	(6)
- * Club domestic league appearances and goals

Mark John Sheeran (born 9 September 1982) is an English former professional football striker who played 32 league games scoring 6 times in three years for Darlington between 2001 and 2004.
