= Gareth Sheldon =

English footballer

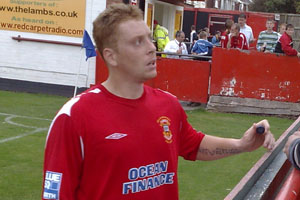

Personal information
- Full name: Gareth Richard Sheldon
- Date of birth: 31 January 1980 (age 46)
- Place of birth: Birmingham, England
- Position: Striker

Senior career*
Years	Team	Apps	(Gls)
1997–2002	Scunthorpe United	89	(8)
2002–2005	Exeter City	80	(13)
2005–2006	Kidderminster Harriers	34	(2)
2006–2007	Hereford United	8	(1)
2007	Halesowen Town	7	(0)
2007–2009	Tamworth	41	(10)
2009	King's Lynn	7	(6)
2009–2010	Atherstone Town	0	(0)
2010–2011	Bolehall Swifts	17	(4)
2011–2012	Bardon Hill		
2012–2013	Bolehall Swifts	10	(2)
2013–2014	Polesworth		

International career
2004	England C	6	(1)
- * Club domestic league appearances and goals

Gareth Richard Sheldon (born 31 January 1980) is an English former professional footballer, who last played for Midland Football Combination Division Two side Polesworth, where he played as a striker.

== Playing career ==
=== Exeter City ===
On 22 May 2002, Sheldon signed a two-year deal with Third Division side Exeter City.

=== Kidderminster Harriers ===
Sheldon's career at Exeter had alerted the attentions of Kidderminster Harriers manager Stuart Watkiss following the club's relegation to the Conference, and on 13 July 2005 they moved to sign him on a free transfer. The move failed to bring out the best in Sheldon, and following a disappointing season and the dismissal of Watkiss, he was released from his contract on 23 June 2006, having made 34 appearances and scored two goals.

=== Hereford United ===
He was picked up on the free transfer the same day by newly promoted League Two side Hereford United. However, Sheldon was unable to secure a regular first-team place. He made eight league appearances for the club, scoring once against Mansfield Town, and his contract was terminated by mutual consent on 27 February 2007.

=== Tamworth ===
On 16 May 2007, Sheldon signed for Tamworth of the Conference North division for the 2007–08 season. Playing in an advanced left-sided midfield position, he won player-of-the-year honours in an under-achieving side. Towards the end of the season, he was played in a central attacking position and his success here was carried over into Tamworth's encouraging start to the 2008–09 season.

=== Bolehall Swifts ===
Following his recovery from his long-term injury, Sheldon joined former Adders manager Daren Fulford at his new club Bolehall Swifts.

== Honours ==
Scunthorpe United

- Football League Third Division play-offs: 1999
