= Tony Richards (footballer, born 1973) =

English football defender

Personal information
- Full name: Tony Spencer Richards
- Date of birth: 17 September 1973 (age 53)
- Place of birth: Newham, England
- Position: Forward

Senior career*
Years	Team	Apps	(Gls)
1990–1993	West Ham United	0	(0)
1993	Hong Kong Rangers		
1994	Sligo Rovers		
1994	Sudbury Town		
1995–1997	Cambridge United	42	(5)
1997–2000	Leyton Orient	63	(11)
2000–2001	Barnet	33	(8)
2001–2002	Southend United	17	(2)
- * Club domestic league appearances and goals

Tony Spencer Richards (born 17 September 1973) is an English former footballer who played in the Football League for Barnet, Cambridge United, Leyton Orient and Southend United.
