= Glanford Park =

Football stadium

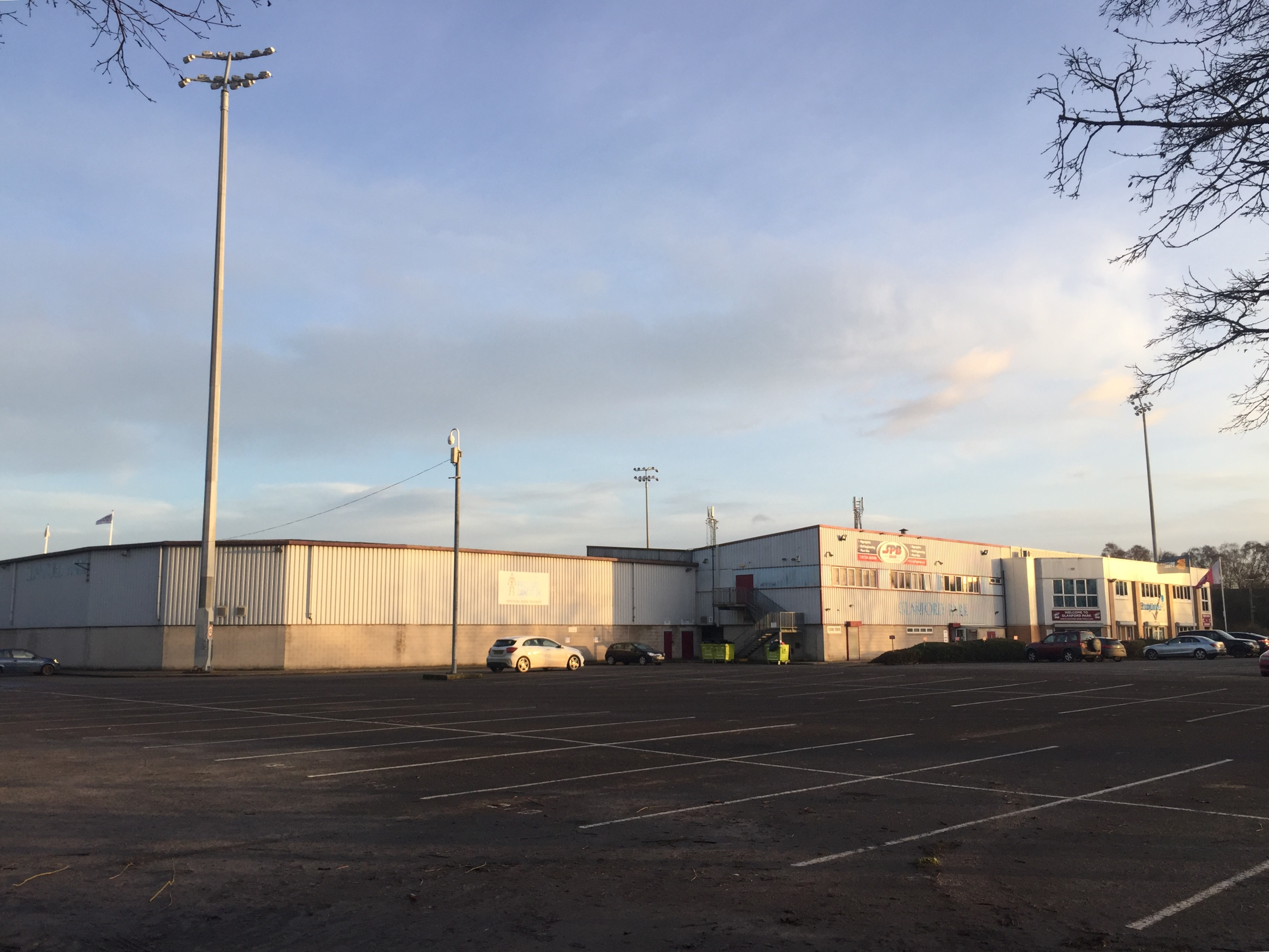
- Glandford Park as viewed from the west car park
- Interactive map of Glanford Park
- Full name: Glanford Park
- Location: Jack Brownsword Way; Scunthorpe; Lincolnshire; DN15 8TD
- Coordinates: 53°35′11″N 0°41′43″W
- Owner: The New Show Ground Community Interest Company
- Operator: Scunthorpe United
- Capacity: 9,088
- Surface: Grass
- Scoreboard: Yes
- Record attendance: 9,086; Scunthorpe United v Chester F.C. 18 May 2025
- Field size: 112 × 72 yards
- Public transit: Scunthorpe (2mi)

Construction
- Groundbreaking: 1987
- Built: 1987–1988
- Opened: 14 August 1988

Tenant
- Scunthorpe United (1988–present)

Glanford Park, currently known as The Attis Arena for sponsorship reasons, is a football stadium in Scunthorpe, Lincolnshire, England, and is the home of National League team Scunthorpe United.

Opened in 1988 at a construction cost of £2.5 million, it was the first new purpose-built Football League stadium to be built in England for 33 years, since Southend United moved to Roots Hall in 1955.

The stadium is Scunthorpe's second ground, with the Iron having previously played at the Old Show Ground from 1899 to 1988. The ground's record attendance was set at 9,086 in a National League North play-off final tie against Chester F.C. on 18 May 2025.

Glanford Park was bought on 29 November 2023 by The New Show Ground Community Interest Company, the creation of local born barrister Tahina Akther. The New Show Ground Community Interest Company is a not for profit entity, allowing Glanford Park to be held for the benefit of the community.

Between 2019 and 2022, the stadium was renamed the Sands Venue Stadium as part of a sponsorship deal. The stadium has been officially known as the Attis Arena since 6 January 2024, when the naming rights were purchased by Leeds-based company Attis Insurance Brokers.

== History ==
Scunthorpe United originally played at the Old Show Ground, which was located towards the centre of the town at the junction of Doncaster Road and Henderson Avenue. In the wake of the Bradford City disaster of 1985, it was determined that substantial improvements would have to be made to the Old Show Ground in order for it to meet new regulations, improvements which the club could not afford. Ultimately it was decided that the best course of action was to relocate to a new out of town site, with the sale of the land occupied by the Old Show Ground being used to raise much needed revenue for the club. After the club relocated, the Old Show Ground was demolished and replaced by a Safeway supermarket, which was subsequently sold to Sainsbury's in 2004.

Construction, which was undertaken by Birse Group, began during 1987 on a site located on the outskirts of Scunthorpe, close to the start of the M181 motorway and approximately 1.5 miles West of the Old Show Ground. The ground was fully completed prior to the commencement of the 1988–89 season and was officially opened at the start of the season by Princess Alexandra. Upon its completion, it was the first new Football League stadium in England for 33 years.

Glanford Park originally opened with a capacity of 11,190, both of the goal-ends being standing terraces, however this capacity was later reduced to its current value of 9,088 in 1991.

The name Glanford Park was derived from its funding by the then Glanford Borough Council, before North Lincolnshire became a unitary authority.

For all but one of its first 17 seasons (1999–2000), the stadium staged fourth tier football prior to Scunthorpe's promotion to League One in 2005, since when they have appeared in either League One or the Football League Championship for all but one season (2013–14).

Premier League side Manchester City visited Glanford Park on 24 January 2010, in the FA Cup fourth round. City won the match 4–2, which saw Robinho score his final goal in English football.

The record attendance is 9,086 for a 2–1 win against Chester FC in their National League North Playoff Final on 18 May 2025.

The record attendance for a Football League game stands at 8,921 for a 2–1 win over Newcastle United in the Championship, coming on 20 October 2009.

In May 2021, the then Scunthorpe United owner, Peter Swann revealed to fans that he had transferred Glanford Park, the training ground, car park and surrounding land to his other business Coolsilk Property and Investment Ltd, in exchange for £11 million worth of loans. At the same time, Swann told the fans they could expect stadium improvements and that the club would have a 99 year lease so they couldn't be evicted. In January 2023, David Hilton had completed a takeover of Scunthorpe and announced the deal included the stadium and surrounding land. The deal provided a four-month exclusivity period for Hilton to conclude a £3 million agreement to buy the property.

However, Hilton's legal team raised concerns about the valuation, the stadium's status as a community asset and issues of planning permission and access. Hilton did not buy the stadium within the agreed timeframe; instead he found a loophole solution: a lease agreement that let the club stay at Glanford Park for 7p a week rent – something Swann considered to be trespass and squatting.

Swann began legal proceedings to sue both Hilton and the club, with an initial court hearing at the end of August 2023 being adjourned until between January 2024 and March 2024.

On 28 September 2023, after club owner David Hilton withdrew funding, the club said that, after its 7 October league game against Brackley, future fixtures would be played at Gainsborough Trinity's home ground, The Northolme, due to a land dispute with Glanford Park's owner, Coolsilk (owned by Peter Swann). Gainsborough, however, said Scunthorpe's statement was issued without their knowledge or consent.

A further change of club ownership took place on 4 October 2023, seeing Michelle Harness and a local consortium take control of the club from David Hilton. Whilst this resolved the Club's immediate financial future the Stadium issues rumbled on. Tahina Akther, a local born Barrister, crafted a deal that enabled The New Show Ground Community Interest Company, a not for profit entity, to purchase the stadium alongside the Local Council purchasing the surrounding training fields and car parks for development. By utilising a CIC structure it ensured that Glanford Park is now "asset locked" and is for the benefit of the community going forward. The purchase was completed on 29 November. As part of the deal the local council also purchased the surrounding land including the training fields and car parks.

== Structure and facilities ==
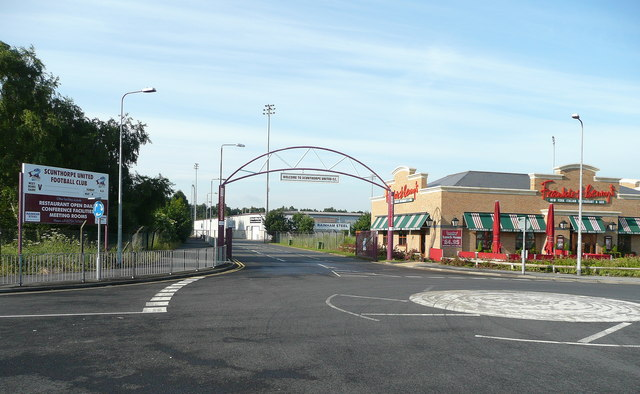
The gated archway at the entrance to Glanford Park on Jack Brownsword Way.

Glanford Park is a relatively simple affair, consisting of four single-tier stands of equal height, three of which are all seated. Although there is no seating in any of the four corners between stands the ground is still fully enclosed, with the rear wall and roof of each stand simply being extended to meet in the corners. Since February 2011, the south-west corner of the ground has been completely filled-in with the construction of the 'Legends Lounge', with the other three simply containing refreshment kiosks.

=== SPB Stand ===
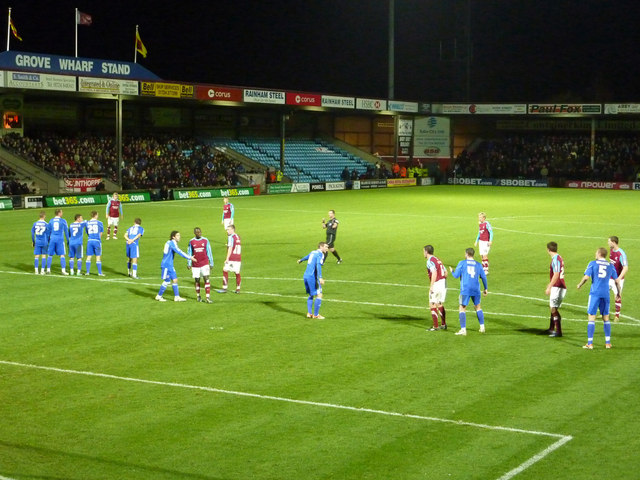
View towards the Clugston Stand (named 'Grove Wharf Stand' at time of photograph).

The SPB stand (formerly the Scunthorpe Telegraph Stand) is the West side stand, and is the ground's main stand. It runs along the entire length of the pitch and is fully seated.

The two southernmost blocks of seating are marketed as the club's family area. To the rear of the stand are the club's various executive suites. These include a restaurant which is open throughout the week, a set of executive boxes, the Sir Ian Botham Executive Lounge and the Legends Lounge, which occupies the south-west corner. Members of the media are allocated a small area of seating at the rear of the stand, and a television gantry is also positioned within the roof space.

The players' tunnel is located centrally within this stand, with the team dugouts being located on either side of the opening. The dressing rooms are naturally all located within this stand.

Other facilities located within this stand include the club's main offices, ticket office, club shop and sports injury clinic.

=== Britcon Stand ===
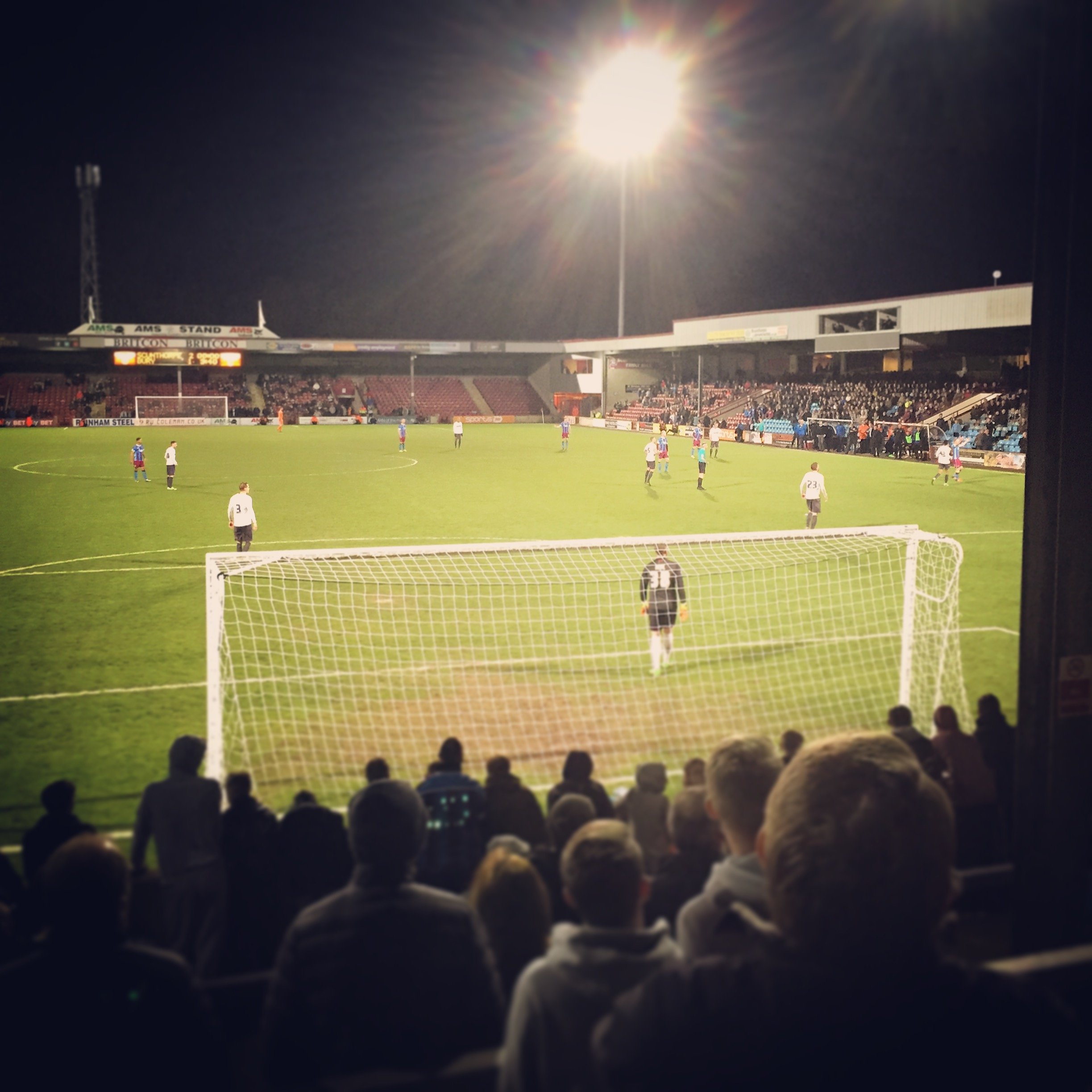
View from the Britcon Stand.

The name of this stand is the most frequently changing. It is much more commonly known as the "Doncaster Road End" among supporters, or even simpler, the "Donny Road End" or "DRE". This stand is the only terraced stand at Glanford Park, and typically houses the more vocal supporters.

The club's popular bar, 'The Iron Bar' is located below this stand and is open on match days prior to kick-off and during half-time.

The Britcon Stand was due to be fitted with seating after the 2010–11 season due to Football League regulations that all standing areas must be made seating following three seasons in the Championship, however Scunthorpe United were subsequently relegated, reprieving the terrace for the time being.

=== Clugston Stand ===
The Clugston Stand (formerly the Grove Wharf Stand prior to the start of the 2012–13 season) is the East stand of the ground, and houses seated home supporters. Disabled seating is available at the front of the stand in four allocated bays. The Clugston Stand now also features a can bar and a food outlet in the void beneath the seating with " Pukka Pies " a local favourite, which along with additional toilet facilities was installed at a cost of £100,000 in 2006.

The stadium's match day control room is located at the rear of this stand behind the seats with tea, coffee and refreshments available for anyone inside the control room. The control room spans a large space with a full non interrupted view of the pitch.

=== AMS Stand ===
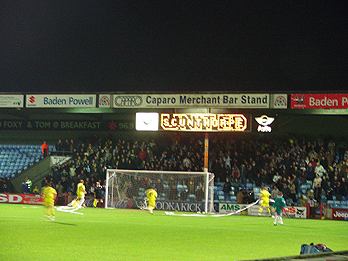
Away supporters in the AMS Stand.

The AMS Stand (also known as the South Stand or "Railway End") houses away supporters, with a maximum capacity of 1,678. Extra away seating can be made available for away fans if required by sectioning off the corner of the Clugston Stand closest to the AMS Stand, however this is only usually done for games such as local derbies. A bar for visiting fans is positioned below this stand.

The AMS Stand was originally a terrace much the same as the Britcon Stand when the stadium was first built, however it was later decided that in the interests of safety that this end should be converted to seating only. This conversion was made during 1991, with the original blue seats being sourced from Aston Villa F.C. as a part of a deal involving the sale of defender Neil Cox to the West Midlands club. These seats were replaced with newer claret-coloured seats prior to the 2007–08 season.

== International matches ==
Glanford Park has hosted several international matches during its lifetime. The first international match to be played at the stadium came on 10 September 1991, with England U21 emerging as 2–1 victors against Germany U21. Since that date Glanford Park has played host to several England U19, England U17 and England U16 games, as well as a match between Portugal U17 and Australia U17 on 25 August 2010, in which Portugal ran out as 4–3 winners.

== Future development ==
In the Scunthorpe Telegraph on 14 December 2006 it was announced that the club were looking to expand the Doncaster Road End of the stadium. Potential improvements mentioned included a second tier and expansion of the club's restaurant. In announcing the plan for expansion, the club's chairman Steven Wharton acknowledged that they were not currently filling the stadium to capacity on a regular basis, but added that he was preparing for a future situation where a larger capacity could be required, as the club were promotion contenders in League One that season, and finished the season being promoted as champions to reach the second tier of English football for the first time since the 1960s. This would have been the first major redevelopment of any stand at Glanford Park since its opening, however these plans were later shelved.

Under government regulations the club would have been required to convert the Doncaster Road End to seating if relegation from the Championship had been avoided in 2010–11. In an effort to overturn this ruling, supporters launched a Keep Scunthorpe Standing campaign. The club revealed revised expansion details in September 2010, with plans to add a three-level building behind the current terrace to include a larger supporters' bar, club shop and ticket office. The capacity of the ground would not have increased; this is due to the change from a terrace to a seating area. As it so happened, the Iron were relegated from the Championship at the end of the 2010–11 season and so these plans never came to fruition.

In January 2014, it was revealed that Scunthorpe United proposed a move to a brand new stadium, which could have seen Glanford Park closed and more than likely demolished within 30 years of being built. The projected cost of the project was £18 million and the new stadium was intended to have a capacity of 12,000. The new stadium was intended to integrate the stadium with 24/7 businesses, including a hotel, an office, training and catering facilities in order to maximize revenue for the club. It was further announced in July 2014 that the site of the new stadium was intended to form the focal point of the new 'Lincolnshire Lakes' development. The project was planned for commencement during 2015–2016 with the creation of 6,000 homes and new community facilities on land between Scunthorpe and the River Trent. Due to issues regarding procurement of the land for the new stadium and issues with one of the developers, the intended site of the new stadium was moved approximately 550 yards (500 m) to the south, and the construction start date was pushed back to some point in late 2017. In October 2017, Scunthorpe United confirmed that the proposal to relocate to the new stadium had been dropped, stating a new aim to instead redevelop and extend Glanford Park, thus securing the immediate future of the stadium for the time being. In February 2019 Mr Swann claimed in a statement on the Scunthorpe United website that promises have been broken and that the truth about what happened with the development continue to be hidden from the public. He called for a public inquiry to be held.

In July 2019 Scunthorpe United FC received planning consent for a £30 million redevelopment of their existing stadium almost a year after submitting plans to North Lincolnshire Council in August 2018.The proposal had taken over three times longer than the government's 13-week guideline for major applications. The delay was unexplained, despite repeated requests from the club for a reason regarding North Lincolnshire Council's delays in decision-making. A new stadium was planned to be constructed stand-by-stand on the current stadium site, with construction taking place over multiple seasons, allowing the club to continue playing without the need to relocate. In August 2020 Swann confirmed that the plans had been placed on hold due to the coronavirus pandemic.

== See also ==
- List of English football stadia by capacity
- Scunthorpe United F.C.
