= Alex Calvo-García =

Spanish footballer

Personal information
- Full name: Alejandro Calvo-García
- Date of birth: 1 January 1972 (age 54)
- Place of birth: Ordizia, Spain
- Height: 1.77 m (5 ft 10 in)
- Position: Midfielder

Senior career*
Years	Team	Apps	(Gls)
1989–1992	Real Sociedad B		
1992–1994	Beasain	51	(10)
1994–1996	Eibar	47	(4)
1996–2004	Scunthorpe United	239	(34)
Total		337	(48)
- * Club domestic league appearances and goals

Alejandro "Alex" Calvo-García (born 1 January 1972), sometimes known as Jandro, is a Spanish former professional footballer who played as a midfielder.

== Career ==
García was born in Ordizia, Gipuzkoa. After unsuccessfully emerging through Real Sociedad's youth ranks and playing with amateurs SD Beasain, he started his professional career with local SD Eibar also in the Basque Country, often playing as a forward. Over two seasons in the Segunda División, he scored four goals in 47 games, two of those in a 2–2 away draw with CA Osasuna on 11 December 1994.

In October 1996, aged 24, García joined English club Scunthorpe United on a free transfer. On 29 May 1999, his goal in the play-off final against Leyton Orient secured The Iron promotion to the Second Division.

During his spell at Glanford Park, García made 280 appearances and scored 45 times. He left at the end of the 2003–04 campaign, returning to Spain.

== Post-retirement ==
After retiring, García, alongside journalist Íñigo Gurruchaga, wrote a book about his days with Scunthorpe, called Scunthorpe hasta la muerte ("Scunthorpe until I die").

== Honours ==
Scunthorpe United

- Football League Third Division play-offs: 1999
