= 2008–09 Cambridge United F.C. season =

Cambridge United
2008–09 season
- Chairman: George Rolls
- Manager: Gary Brabin
- Conference National: 2nd
- FA Cup: First round (lost to Kidderminster)
- Conference League Cup: Third round (lost to A.F.C. Telford)
- FA Trophy: Second round (lost to Crawley Town)
- Top goalscorer: Scott Rendell (13)
- Highest home attendance: 7,090 (v Altrincham, League, 26 Apr)
- Lowest home attendance: 2,662 (v Northwich, League, 14 Mar)
- Average home league attendance: 3,567
Home colours	Away colours

The 2008–09 season was the 97th season in the history of Cambridge United, and the club's fourth consecutive season in the Conference National. After finishing as runners-up and losing in the play-off final during the 2007–08 season, the club were optimistic of a return to the Football League either as champions or through the play-offs.

The club appointed little-known manager Gary Brabin to guide them through the season, who joined from Southport with relatively little managerial experience. He replaced the successful Jimmy Quinn who parted company with the club by mutual consent after lengthy talks with chairman Phillip Law.

The club enjoyed a successful season, although they were not close to catching eventual champions Burton Albion for much of the season. However, in the final months some excellent form, together with the departure of Burton's manager Nigel Clough, saw the gap close and Cambridge could have won the title and promotion on the final day of the season had they beaten rather than drawn at home to Altrincham. As it was they finished runners-up for the second successive season and despite a memorable play-off campaign, which included beating Stevenage Borough 3–0 after extra time in the second leg at the Abbey Stadium to overturn a first-leg deficit, Cambridge lost the play-off final to Torquay United.

== Background ==
Cambridge United were founded in 1912 as Abbey United, named after the Abbey district of Cambridge. For many years they played amateur football until their election to the Football League in 1970. The early 1990s was Cambridge's most successful period; managed by John Beck the club won the first ever play-off final at Wembley Stadium and gained promotion from the Fourth Division before reaching two successive FA Cup quarter finals in 1990 and 1991 and winning the Third Division in 1991. The club reached the play-offs in 1992 but failed in their bid to become founder members of the Premier League. This was the club's highest final league placing to date and since then it has been in almost constant decline.

The following season the club sacked Beck and were relegated from the First Division. Further relegation followed two seasons later. United returned to Division Two but were relegated in 2002. In 2005, after 35 years in the Football League, Cambridge United were relegated into the Football Conference. This brought with it financial difficulties and the club filed for administration, coming out of it three months later after the intervention of sports minister Richard Caborn, but not before selling their Abbey Stadium home to keep the club afloat and closing the youth system.

The club's first season in the Conference National was one of stabilisation, followed by a close shave with relegation. Under the stewardship of Jimmy Quinn, the club recovered in the previous season to finish in the play-off final. However, after despite losing the 1–0 to Exeter City, the club were hoping to build on this relative success under the new management of Gary Brabin following Quinn's departure.

== Team kit ==
The team kit for the season was produced by Vandanel for the second season. The same kit was used as in the previous season, with a white and black away shirt, and amber and black striped home shirt. As for previous seasons, the kit had two different sponsors - local company Global Self Drive at home and Kershaw away.

A special edition play-off final shirt was also released and worn for that match. Produced by Vandanel, the shirt was all amber with limited black trim and sponsored by Kershaw.

== Team ==
=== First team squad ===
This table shows the squad as it stood at the end of the season.

Note: Flags indicate national team as defined under FIFA eligibility rules; some limited exceptions apply. Players may hold more than one non-FIFA nationality.

No.	Pos.	Nation	Player
1	GK	ENG	Danny Potter
2	DF	ENG	Dan Gleeson
3	DF	ENG	Anthony Tonkin
4	MF	IRL	Daryl McMahon
5	DF	ENG	Phil Bolland
6	DF	ENG	Wayne Hatswell
7	FW	ENG	Mark Beesley
8	MF	ENG	Andy Parkinson
10	MF	ENG	Jon Challinor
11	MF	ENG	Courtney Pitt

No.	Pos.	Nation	Player
12	DF	ENG	Josh Coulson
15	MF	ENG	Paul Carden
16	MF	ENG	Ben Farrell
18	MF	ENG	Robbie Willmott
21	FW	ENG	Chris Holroyd
25	MF	ENG	Jai Reason
26	DF	ENG	Rory McAuley
27	FW	ENG	Lee Phillips
28	FW	ENG	Danny Crow
30	GK	ENG	Aaron Grundy

=== Top scorers ===
Includes matched in the Conference National, FA Cup and FA Trophy. Where total goals are equal, the list is sorted in favour of league goals, and then alphabetical order.

Position	Nation	Name	Conference National	FA Cup	Total
1	(England)	Scott Rendell	13	2	15
2	(England)	Lee McEvilly	8	3	11
3	(England)	Chris Holroyd	10	0	10
4	(England)	Robbie Willmott	6	2	8
5	(England)	Mark Beesley	4	0	4
=	(England)	Danny Crow	2	2	4
=	(England)	Wayne Hatswell	4	0	4
8	(England)	Jon Challinor	2	0	2
=	(England)	Felino Jardim	2	0	2
=	(England)	Courtney Pitt	2	0	2
11	(England)	Phil Bolland	1	0	1
=	(England)	Dan Brown	1	0	1
=	(England)	Paul Carden	1	0	1
=	(England)	Mark Convery	1	0	1
=	(England)	Ben Farrell	1	0	1
=	(England)	Andy Parkinson	1	0	1
=	(England)	Lee Phillips	1	0	1
		TOTALS	60	9	69

== Match results ==
Match won	Match drawn	Match lost	Biggest win	Biggest loss	Top	Play-Off Position

=== Pre-season ===
Friendlies
Kick Off	Opponents	H / A	Result	Scorers	Attendance
12 July 2008	(England) King's Lynn	A	2 – 3	Beesley, Reed	unknown
15 July 2008	(England) Cambridge City	A	1 – 1	Beesley	910
19 July 2008	(England) Everton	H	4 – 2	Parkinson (2), Willmott, Beesley	4,495
23 July 2008	(England) Soham Town Rangers	A	4 – 2	Willmott (2), Jardim (2)	569
26 July 2008	(England) Coventry City	H	1 – 3	Farrell	1,751
28 July 2008	(England) Bedford Town	A	1 – 2	Ives	304
30 July 2008	(England) West Ham United	H	0 – 0	–	2,491
1 August 2008	(England) Braintree Town	A	Cancelled	–	–

=== League ===
Kick Off	Opponents	H / A	Result	Scorers	Attendance	Pos
9 August 2008	Northwich Victoria	A	1 – 0	Jardim 28'	1,445	6th
12 August 2008	Kidderminster Harriers	H	2 – 1	McEvilly 27', 61'	3,008	4th
16 August 2008	Barrow	H	2 – 1	McEvilly 28', Hatswell 40'	2,663	1st
23 August 2008	Eastbourne Borough	A	3 – 0	McEvilly 21', Farrell 40', Holroyd 84'	2,105	1st
25 August 2008	Kettering Town	H	0 – 2	–	3,489	2nd
30 August 2008	Weymouth	A	2 – 2	McEvilly 42', Beesley 45'	1,367	3rd
2 September 2008	Ebbsfleet United	A	1 – 1	McEvilly 45'	1,832	4th
6 September 2008	Wrexham	H	2 – 0	Beesley 28', 64'	3,076	2nd
13 September 2008	Torquay United	H	0 – 1	–	4,041	5th
20 September 2008	Mansfield Town	A	1 – 1	Brown 33'	3,171	6th
23 September 2008	Oxford United	H	1 – 3	Jardim 56'	4,170	8th
28 September 2008	Grays Athletic	H	1 – 0	McEvilly 90' (pen)	2,971	5th
4 October 2008	York City	A	0 – 0	–	2,608	6th
7 October 2008	Lewes	H	1 – 0	Challinor 90'	3,194	5th
11 October 2008	Weymouth	H	1 – 0	Challinor 11'	3,981	3rd
16 October 2008	Forest Green Rovers	A	2 – 2	Hatswell 34', Crow 66'	789	3rd
1 November 2008	Rushden & Diamonds	H	0 – 0	–	3,547	7th
15 November 2008	Crawley Town	A	2 – 2	McEvilly 51' (pen), Convery 90'	1,570	7th
18 November 2008	York City	H	1 – 0	Purkiss (OG) 51'	2,914	4th
22 November 2008	Altrincham	A	0 – 1	–	1,123	5th
29 November 2008	Ebbsfleet United	H	1 – 0	Rendell 45'	2,807	4th
6 December 2008	Torquay United	A	0 – 0	–	2,310	6th
9 December 2008	Burton Albion	A	1 – 3	Rendell 63'	1,804	6th
20 December 2008	Salisbury City	H	4 – 0	Willmott 24', Rendell 51', Holroyd 62', Pitt 63'	3,340	6th
26 December 2008	Histon	H	2 – 2	Hatswell 15', Rendell 42'	6,488	6th
28 December 2008	Stevenage Borough	H	1 – 1	Rendell 3'	3,351	6th
17 January 2009	Woking	H	4 – 1	Crow 3', 22', Beesley 66', Willmott 83'	2,696	5th
22 January 2009	Wrexham	A	0 – 2	–	3,103	6th
29 January 2009	Oxford United	H	1 – 1	Carden 72'	3,774	7th
1 February 2009	Rushden & Diamonds	A	2 – 1	Holroyd 21' (pen), Bolland 88'	2,058	3rd
17 February 2009	Kidderminster Harriers	A	3 – 1	Rendell 20' (pen), Holroyd 31', 55'	1,361	3rd
21 February 2009	Lewes	A	2 – 0	Rendell 83' (pen), Willmott 87'	962	3rd
24 February 2009	Grays Athletic	A	1 – 0	Rendell 42'	754	3rd
28 February 2009	Crawley Town	H	1 – 1	Pitt 82'	3,231	3rd
2 Match 2009	Histon	A	1 – 1	Hatswell 74'	2,579	3rd
7 March 2009	Burton Albion	H	2 – 0	Rendell 55', Willmott 76'	4,377	2nd
10 March 2009	Mansfield Town	H	2 – 1	Rendell 49', Reason 90'	2,781	2nd
14 March 2009	Northwich Victoria	H	4 – 1	Holroyd 25', Rendell 30', 37', Parkinson 80'	2,662	2nd
17 March 2009	Barrow	A	2 – 0	Holroyd 63', 83'	1,341	2nd
30 March 2009	Woking	A	1 – 0	Reason 83'	1,775	2nd
4 April 2009	Forest Green Rovers	H	0 – 1	–	3,245	2nd
7 April 2009	Stevenage Borough	A	1 – 2	Willmott 17'	3,408	3rd
11 April 2009	Eastbourne Borough	H	2 – 1	Phillips 65', Holroyd 71' (pen)	3,391	2nd
11 April 2009	Kettering Town	A	2 – 1	Holroyd 14' (pen), Willmott 74'	2,340	2nd
11 April 2009	Salisbury City	A	2 – 1	Rendell 19', Parkinson 45'	1,031	2nd
11 April 2009	Altrincham	H	0 – 0	–	7,090	2nd

==== Play-offs ====
30 April 2009 Play-off semi-final first leg	Stevenage Borough	3 – 1	Cambridge United	Stevenage
19:45	Roberts 47', Morison 61', 85'	Report	Phillips 48'	Stadium: Broadhall Way; Attendance: 4,446; Referee: Rob Whitton

4 May 2009 Play-off semi-final second leg	Cambridge United	3 – 0	Stevenage Borough	Cambridge
12:00	Willmott 56', Rendell 72', 119'	Report		Stadium: Abbey Stadium; Attendance: 6,507; Referee: Paul Tierney

17 May 2009 Play-off final	Cambridge United	0 – 2	Torquay United	London
16:00		Report	Hargreaves 35', Sills 75'	Stadium: Wembley Stadium; Attendance: 35,089; Referee: Gary Sutton

=== FA Cup ===
25 October 2008 Fourth qualifying round	Boston United	2 – 3	Cambridge United	Boston
15:00	Leabon 28', Ryan 57'	Report	Crow 8', Willmott 48', Bloomer (OG) 83'	Stadium: York Street; Attendance: 1,956; Referee: Richard West

8 November 2008 First round	Kidderminster Harriers	1 – 0	Cambridge United	Kidderminster
15:00	Richards (pen)17'	Report		Stadium: Aggborough; Attendance: 1,717; Referee: Paul Tierney

=== FA Trophy ===
13 December 2008 First round	Histon	2 – 3	Cambridge United	Impington
15:00	Midson 5', Knight-Percival 60'	Report	Rendell 46', (pen)52', Willmott 90'	Stadium: Bridge Road; Attendance: 1,146; Referee: Gary Sutton

14 January 2009 First round	Cambridge United	0 – 5	Crawley Town	Cambridge
15:00		Report	Weatherstone 10', Pittman 56', 85', 88', Quinn 90'	Stadium: Abbey Stadium; Attendance: 1,233; Referee: Michael Naylor

=== Conference League Cup ===
4 November 2008 Third round	Telford United	4 – 3	Cambridge United	Telford
19:45	Carey-Bertram 9', Rodgers 21', Fearns 54', 72'	Report	McEvilly 15', (pen)77', 90'	Stadium: New Bucks Head; Attendance: 941; Referee: P Wright

== League table ==
Pos	Team	Pld	W	D	L	GF	GA	GD	Pts	Promotion, qualification or relegation
1	Burton Albion (C, P)	46	27	7	12	81	52	+29	88	Promotion to Football League Two
2	Cambridge United	46	24	14	8	65	39	+26	86	Qualification for the Conference Premier play-offs
3	Histon	46	23	14	9	78	48	+30	83	Qualification for the Conference Premier play-offs
4	Torquay United (O, P)	46	23	14	9	72	47	+25	83	Qualification for the Conference Premier play-offs
5	Stevenage Borough	46	23	12	11	73	54	+19	81	Qualification for the Conference Premier play-offs

Source: Football Conference
Rules for classification: 1) points; 2) goal difference; 3) number of goals scored.
(C) Champions; (O) Play-off winners; (P) Promoted

== Awards ==
Awarded on 2 June 2009.

Award	Name	No.	Pos.
Internet Player of the Year	(England) Wayne Hatswell	10	DF
Internet Young Player of the Year	(England) Chris Holroyd	4	FW
Goal of the Season	(England) Paul Carden (vs Oxford United)	15	MF

== See also ==
- History of Cambridge United F.C.
- 2008–09 in English football
- 2008–09 Football Conference
