= 2009 Conference Premier play-off final =

Cambridge United	Torquay United
0	2
- Date: 17 May 2009
- Venue: Wembley Stadium, London
- Referee: G Sutton
- Attendance: 35,089

The 2009 Conference Premier play-off final, known as the 2009 Blue Square Premier play-off final for sponsorship purposes, was a football match between Cambridge United and Torquay United on 17 May 2009 at Wembley Stadium in London. It was the seventh Conference Premier play-off final and the third to be played at Wembley Stadium.

Torquay won the match 2–0 to secure promotion to League Two, thus returning to The Football League after a two-year absence. Following their victory, Torquay United announced an open-top bus parade which took place on Thursday 21 May.

== Match ==
=== Details ===
17 May 2009
16:00 BST

Cambridge United	0–2	Torquay United
	Report	Hargreaves 35'; Sills 75'

Wembley Stadium, London
Attendance: 35,089
Referee: Gary Sutton (Lincolnshire)

GK	20	Adam Bartlett
RB	2	Dan Gleeson
CB	5	Phil Bolland
CB	6	Wayne Hatswell
LB	3	Anthony Tonkin
RM	18	Robbie Willmott	(substituted off) 80'
CM	15	Paul Carden	(substituted off) 79'
CM	25	Jai Reason
LM	11	Courtney Pitt	(substituted off) 61'
CF	9	Scott Rendell
CF	27	Lee Phillips
Substitutes:
MF	4	Daryl McMahon
MF	8	Andy Parkinson	(substituted in) 61'
MF	10	Jon Challinor	(substituted in) 79'
FW	21	Chris Holroyd	(substituted in) 80'
FW	28	Danny Crow
Manager:
Gary Brabin

GK	1	Michael Poke
RB	7	Lee Mansell
CB	6	Chris Todd
CB	5	Chris Robertson
LB	3	Kevin Nicholson
RM	15	Wayne Carlisle	(substituted off) 90'
CM	11	Nicky Wroe
CM	14	Chris Hargreaves
LM	19	Danny Stevens	(substituted off) 84'
CF	8	Tim Sills
CF	9	Elliot Benyon	(substituted off) 86'
Substitutes:
GK	23	Martin Rice
MF	12	Tyrone Thompson	(substituted in) 86'
MF	16	Lee Hodges	(substituted in) 84'
MF	18	Mustapha Carayol	(substituted in) 90'
FW	17	Matt Green
Manager:
Paul Buckle

Match rules:

- 90 minutes.
- 30 minutes of extra time if necessary.
- Penalty shoot-out if scores still level.
- Five named substitutes
- Maximum of three substitutions.
