= 2008 Conference Premier play-off final =

Cambridge United	Exeter City
0	1
- Date: 18 May 2008
- Venue: Wembley Stadium, London
- Referee: Craig Pawson (South Yorkshire)
- Attendance: 42,511

The 2008 Conference Premier play-off final, known as the 2008 Blue Square Premier play-off final for sponsorship purposes, was a football match between Cambridge United and Exeter City took place on 18 May 2008 at Wembley Stadium, London. It was contested between Cambridge United and Exeter City, with Exeter winning 1–0 and securing their return to the Football League after five years' absence.

This was the third successive conference play-off final for Adam Stansfield, and the second one in which he featured for the winning team.

== Match ==
=== Details ===
18 May 2008
16:00 BST

Cambridge United	0–1	Exeter City
	Report	Edwards 22'

Wembley Stadium, London
Attendance: 42,511
Referee: Craig Pawson (South Yorkshire)

Cambridge Utd	Exeter City

GK	1	Danny Potter
RB	7	Dan Gleeson	Booked	(substituted off) 75'
CB	5	Mark Peters
CB	6	Mark Albrighton
LB	27	Wayne Hatswell
RM	8	Rob Wolleaston
CM	4	Danny Brown		(substituted off) 67'
CM	15	Paul Carden
LM	11	Courtney Pitt
CF	10	Lee Boylan		(substituted off) 70'
CF	28	Lee McEvilly
Substitutes:
DF	3	Stephen Reed		(substituted in) 67'
DF	21	Michael Morrison
FW	17	Mark Beesley
FW	19	Leo Fortune-West		(substituted in) 75'
FW	39	Magno Vieira		(substituted in) 70'
Manager:
Jimmy Quinn

GK	27	Paul Jones
RB	2	Steve Tully
CB	5	Danny Seaborne (c)
CB	16	Matt Taylor
LB	3	George Friend
CM	4	Matthew Gill
CM	15	Rob Edwards
CM	28	Ryan Harley
RF	20	Richard Logan
CF	9	Adam Stansfield	(substituted off) 84'
LF	21	Dean Moxey
Substitutes:
GK	1	Andy Marriott
MF	10	Wayne Carlisle
MF	11	Lee Elam
MF	14	Bertie Cozic
FW	32	Ben Watson	(substituted in) 84'
Manager:
Paul Tisdale

Match rules:

- 90 minutes.
- 30 minutes of extra time if necessary.
- Penalty shoot-out if scores still level.
- Five named substitutes
- Maximum of three substitutions.
