= Holroyd (surname) =

Holroyd is a surname, and may refer to:

- Adam Holroyd (born 2004), English rugby league footballer
- Alexandre Holroyd (born 1987), French politician
- Arthur Holroyd (1806–1887), Australian lawyer and politician
- Bill Holroyd (born 1953), British investor and philanthropist
- Sir Charles Holroyd (1861–1917), English artist and curator
- Chris Holroyd (born 1986), English footballer
- Edward Dundas Holroyd (1828–1916), Australian judge
- Edwin Holroyd (1855–1914), English cricketer
- Eleanor Holroyd, New Zealand nursing academic
- Eric Holroyd (1916–2005), English racing cyclist
- Eric Holroyd (footballer) (1905–1987), English footballer
- Fanny Holroyd (1863–1924), Australian-British painter
- Fred Holroyd, British soldier and author
- George Sowley Holroyd (1758–1831), English lawyer and judge
- George Holroyd, 2nd Earl of Sheffield (1802–1876), British politician
- Glen Holroyd (born 1954), American tennis player
- Graham Holroyd (born 1975), English rugby league and rugby union footballer
- Harriet Holroyd, Countess of Sheffield (1802–1889), English courtier
- Henry Holroyd, 3rd Earl of Sheffield (1832–1909), English politician
- John Holroyd (cricketer) (1907–1975), English cricketer
- John Holroyd (civil servant) (1935–2014), English government official
- John Baker Holroyd, 1st Earl of Sheffield (1735–1821), Anglo-Irish politician and soldier
- Kate Holroyd (born 1963), British rower
- Lincoln Holroyd (1881–1961), English-American cornet player
- Michael Holroyd (born 1935), English biographer
- Norman Holroyd (1914–2002), British weightlifter
- Percy Holroyd, English rugby league footballer
- Scott Holroyd (born 1975), American actor
- Shelley Holroyd (born 1973), English female javelin thrower
- Stuart Holroyd (born 1933), British writer
- Thomas Holroyd (1821–1904), British portrait and landscape painter
- Tom Holroyd (born 2001), English rugby league footballer
