= 2021–22 National League =

National League
- Season: 2021–22

The 2021–22 National League season, known as the Vanarama National League for sponsorship reasons, was the seventh season as English football's National League, the eighteenth season consisting of three divisions, and the forty-third season overall.

Due to the curtailment of the preceding season for North and South and lower levels of competition in the English football pyramid, promotion and relegation between levels 5 and 6, and between level 6 and lower levels were suspended. These, combined with the folding of Macclesfield Town in 2020–21 and the knock-on effects of Bury's collapse in 2019–20, meant that for the 2021–22 season the three divisions had the irregular complement of 23, 22 and 21 teams, respectively.

In 2019, prior to these COVID-19 related impacts, the league had intended the 2021–22 season to be the first using a new structure in which the number of teams in its North and South divisions would increase, resulting in three 24-team divisions. On 1 July 2021, the National League confirmed its intent to achieve this structure for the 2022–23 season; accordingly the following adjustments to promotion and relegation were in effect for this season:

- As before, two teams were promoted from the National League to League Two and replaced by two teams relegated from it;
- Three teams were relegated from the National League to the two level 6 divisions, and replaced by four teams (two from each of the National League North and South); and
- Two teams were relegated from the two level 6 divisions (one from the National League North and another from the National League South) to the premier divisions of the Northern Premier League, Southern League Central or South, or Isthmian League, and replaced by eight teams (two from each division). The Football Association already clarified these relegations by November.

== National League ==
National League
- Season: 2021–22
- Dates: 21 August 2021 – 21 May 2022
- Champions: Stockport County
- Promoted: Stockport County; Grimsby Town
- Relegated: Dover Athletic; King's Lynn Town; Weymouth

=== Team changes ===
To National League

Promoted from 2020–21 National League North

- None

Promoted from 2020–21 National League South

- None

Relegated from 2020–21 League Two

- Southend United
- Grimsby Town

From National League

Promoted to 2021–22 League Two

- Sutton United
- Hartlepool United

Relegated to 2021–22 National League North

- None

Relegated to 2021–22 National League South

- None

Grimsby Town became the first former top-flight First Division club to be relegated to the National League twice, and their matches against Notts County make them the second pairing of clubs to face each other across all top five tiers of English football (after the Luton Town vs Oxford United fixture).

=== Stadia and locations ===
Locations of the 2021–22 National League clubs (Greater London shown in more detail below)
Locations of the 2021–22 National League clubs (Greater London)

Team	Location	Stadium	Capacity
Aldershot Town	Aldershot	Recreation Ground	7,200
Altrincham	Altrincham	Moss Lane	7,700
Barnet	London (Canons Park)	The Hive Stadium	6,418
Boreham Wood	Borehamwood	Meadow Park	4,502
Bromley	London (Bromley)	Hayes Lane	5,300
Chesterfield	Chesterfield	Proact Stadium	10,504
Dagenham & Redbridge	London (Dagenham)	Victoria Road	6,078
Dover Athletic	Dover	Crabble Athletic Ground	5,745
Eastleigh	Eastleigh	Ten Acres	5,250
FC Halifax Town	Halifax	The Shay	10,400
Grimsby Town	Cleethorpes	Blundell Park	9,052
King's Lynn Town	King's Lynn	The Walks	8,200
Maidenhead United	Maidenhead	York Road	4,000
Notts County	Nottingham	Meadow Lane	19,588
Solihull Moors	Solihull	Damson Park	5,500
Southend United	Southend-on-Sea	Roots Hall	12,392
Stockport County	Stockport	Edgeley Park	10,852
Torquay United	Torquay	Plainmoor	6,500
Wealdstone	London (Ruislip)	Grosvenor Vale	4,085
Weymouth	Weymouth	Bob Lucas Stadium	6,600
Woking	Woking	Kingfield Stadium	6,036
Wrexham	Wrexham	Racecourse Ground	10,771
Yeovil Town	Yeovil	Huish Park	9,566

=== Personnel and sponsoring ===
Team	Manager^{1}	Captain	Kit manufacturer	Shirt sponsor
Aldershot Town	Mark Molesley	George Fowler	Erreà	Bridges Estate Agents
Altrincham	Phil Parkinson	Jake Moult	Puma	J Davidson Ltd
Barnet	Dean Brennan	Jamie Turley	Established 1888	TIC Health
Boreham Wood	Luke Garrard	Mark Ricketts	Puma	Barnet and Southgate College
Bromley	Andy Woodman	Byron Webster	Puma	Southwark Metals
Chesterfield	Paul Cook	Gavin Gunning	Puma	Technique Learning Solutions
Dagenham & Redbridge	Daryl McMahon	Kenny Clark	Nike	West & Coe
Dover Athletic	Andy Hessenthaler	Ryan Hanson	Kappa	GSH Group
Eastleigh	Lee Bradbury	Danny Hollands	Kappa	Utilita
FC Halifax Town	Pete Wild	Niall Maher	Adidas	CORE Facility Services (Home); Nuie (Away)
Grimsby Town	Paul Hurst	Giles Coke	Macron	Young's Seafood
King's Lynn Town	Tommy Widdrington	Aaron Jones	Kappa	Charmed Interiors (home), Barsby Produce (away)
Maidenhead United	Alan Devonshire	Alan Massey	Uhlsport	G&L Scientific
Notts County	Ian Burchnall	Kyle Cameron	Puma	Sharpes of Nottingham
Solihull Moors	Neal Ardley	Kyle Storer	Surridge	John Shepherd Estate Agents
Southend United	Kevin Maher	John White	Macron	Watchlotto
Stockport County	Dave Challinor	Liam Hogan	Puma	VITA Group
Torquay United	Gary Johnson	Asa Hall	Nike	No Sponsor
Wealdstone	Stuart Maynard	Jerome Okimo	Kelme	GPF Lewis
Weymouth	David Oldfield	Josh McQuoid	Umbro	Dormeo UK
Woking	Darren Sarll	Josh Casey	Adidas	Boz's Fruit & Veg
Wrexham	Phil Parkinson	Luke Young	Macron	TikTok
Yeovil Town	Charlie Lee (caretaker manager)	Vacant	Hummel	Jurassic Fibre

=== Managerial changes ===
Team	Outgoing manager	Manner of departure	Date of vacancy	Position in table	Incoming manager	Date of appointment
Solihull Moors	(England) Mark Yates	End of interim spell	29 May 2021	Pre-season	(England) Neal Ardley	14 June 2021
Wrexham	(England) Dean Keates	End of contract	30 May 2021	Pre-season	(England) Phil Parkinson	1 July 2021
Barnet	(England) Simon Bassey	Resigned	3 June 2021	Pre-season	(Australia) Harry Kewell	10 June 2021
Aldershot Town	(England) Danny Searle	Sacked	20 September 2021	21st	(England) Mark Molesley	20 September 2021
Barnet	(Australia) Harry Kewell	Sacked	20 September 2021	22nd	(Republic of Ireland) Dean Brennan	20 September 2021
Southend United	(England) Phil Brown	Sacked	9 October 2021	20th	(Republic of Ireland) Kevin Maher	20 October 2021
Stockport County	(Scotland) Simon Rusk	Sacked	27 October 2021	10th	(England) Dave Challinor	2 November 2021
King's Lynn Town	(England) Ian Culverhouse	Sacked	29 November 2021	22nd	(England) Tommy Widdrington	10 December 2021
Weymouth	(Wales) Brian Stock	Sacked	12 January 2022	21st	(England) David Oldfield	18 January 2022
Eastleigh	(England) Ben Strevens	Sacked	26 January 2022	14th	(England) Lee Bradbury	28 February 2022
Chesterfield	(England) James Rowe	Mutual consent	4 February 2022	2nd	(England) Paul Cook	10 February 2022
Woking	(England) Alan Dowson	Sacked	28 February 2022	16th	(England) Darren Sarll	28 March 2022
Yeovil Town	(England) Darren Sarll	Signed by Woking	28 March 2022	12th	(England) Charlie Lee (caretaker)	28 March 2022
Yeovil Town	(England) Charlie Lee (caretaker)	End of caretaker spell	13 May 2022	13th	(England) Josh Staunton (caretaker)	13 May 2022

=== National League table ===
Pos	Team	Pld	W	D	L	GF	GA	GD	Pts	Promotion, qualification or relegation
1	Stockport County (C, P)	44	30	4	10	87	38	+49	94	Promotion to EFL League Two
2	Wrexham	44	26	10	8	91	46	+45	88	Qualification for the National League play-off semi-finals
3	Solihull Moors	44	25	12	7	83	45	+38	87	Qualification for the National League play-off semi-finals
4	FC Halifax Town	44	25	9	10	62	35	+27	84	Qualification for the National League play-off quarter-finals
5	Notts County	44	24	10	10	81	52	+29	82	Qualification for the National League play-off quarter-finals
6	Grimsby Town (O, P)	44	23	8	13	68	46	+22	77	Qualification for the National League play-off quarter-finals
7	Chesterfield	44	20	14	10	69	51	+18	74	Qualification for the National League play-off quarter-finals
8	Dagenham & Redbridge	44	22	7	15	80	53	+27	73	
9	Boreham Wood	44	18	13	13	49	40	+9	67	
10	Bromley	44	18	13	13	61	53	+8	67	
11	Torquay United	44	18	12	14	66	54	+12	66	
12	Yeovil Town	44	15	14	15	43	46	−3	59	
13	Southend United	44	16	10	18	45	61	−16	58	
14	Altrincham	44	15	10	19	62	69	−7	55	
15	Woking	44	16	5	23	59	61	−2	53	
16	Wealdstone	44	14	11	19	51	65	−14	53	
17	Maidenhead United	44	13	12	19	48	67	−19	51	
18	Barnet	44	13	11	20	59	89	−30	50	
19	Eastleigh	44	12	10	22	52	74	−22	46	
20	Aldershot Town	44	11	10	23	46	73	−27	43	
21	King's Lynn Town (R)	44	8	10	26	47	79	−32	34	Relegation to National League North
22	Weymouth (R)	44	6	10	28	40	88	−48	28	Relegation to National League South
23	Dover Athletic (R)	44	2	7	35	37	101	−64	1 (Note: Dover Athletic were deducted twelve points for failing to complete fixtures during the 2020–21 season.)	Relegation to National League South

Source: National League official site
Rules for classification: 1) Points; 2) Goal difference; 3) Number of goals scored; 4) Number of matches won; 5) Head-to-head results
(C) Champions; (O) Play-off winners; (P) Promoted; (R) Relegated

=== Results table ===
Home \ Away	STO	WRE	SOL	HAL	NOT	GRI	CHE	DAG	BOR	TOR	BRO	SOU	YEO	ALT	WOK	MDH	WEA	BRN	EAS	ALD	KIN	WEY	DOV
Stockport County	—	2–1	1–0	2–0	3–0	0–0	2–2	1–3	1–2	1–0	1–1	5–0	0–3	5–1	1–0	3–0	4–2	1–2	3–0	1–0	5–0	1–0	1–0
Wrexham	3–0	—	1–1	3–1	1–1	1–0	1–1	1–0	4–2	1–1	2–0	1–0	0–2	4–0	1–0	1–1	0–0	6–0	3–2	4–1	2–0	1–0	6–5
Solihull Moors	0–1	2–2	—	1–0	3–3	2–0	0–2	3–1	3–1	2–1	3–0	2–0	0–0	5–0	2–0	3–1	2–1	1–1	5–3	2–1	2–2	3–4	5–0
FC Halifax Town	3–0	1–2	0–0	—	3–2	1–0	2–0	1–0	0–1	2–0	1–0	3–1	1–0	2–0	2–1	1–2	2–0	1–0	4–0	1–1	2–0	2–0	2–1
Notts County	2–1	3–1	2–0	1–1	—	1–2	1–1	2–1	1–0	1–1	1–1	4–1	1–1	3–0	1–4	1–0	3–2	6–1	2–0	3–2	4–1	3–1	1–0
Grimsby Town	2–1	3–1	1–2	1–1	0–1	—	0–1	2–1	1–0	2–1	1–2	1–0	2–0	2–0	1–0	1–3	2–1	4–3	2–0	3–1	0–0	1–0	6–0
Chesterfield	0–1	0–2	2–3	1–1	3–1	1–4	—	2–1	2–1	2–2	2–2	2–2	1–0	2–2	0–0	1–0	2–0	4–2	1–0	0–0	1–0	4–0	3–2
Dagenham & Redbridge	0–2	3–0	5–1	1–3	1–2	3–2	2–2	—	0–0	0–0	4–2	3–0	0–1	2–3	1–1	3–0	2–2	7–3	0–1	1–0	1–1	4–2	3–1
Boreham Wood	0–0	1–1	0–3	2–2	1–1	0–0	1–1	2–0	—	2–0	2–0	1–0	2–1	2–0	0–1	4–0	1–0	0–0	1–0	1–0	3–1	1–1	1–2
Torquay United	2–1	1–0	0–2	2–3	5–1	1–3	2–0	2–2	0–0	—	0–0	1–0	3–0	1–3	0–4	1–1	5–0	2–2	0–0	4–0	2–0	3–0	2–1
Bromley	1–3	0–0	2–1	0–0	1–0	3–1	4–2	0–2	2–3	2–0	—	1–1	1–2	1–1	1–0	0–0	3–2	2–0	3–0	1–1	3–2	3–0	2–2
Southend United	0–1	2–2	1–1	1–0	0–3	1–0	0–4	0–3	1–0	1–1	2–0	—	2–1	2–0	0–2	1–1	0–1	2–1	1–0	2–3	2–1	1–1	4–1
Yeovil Town	2–1	1–2	0–0	1–0	0–2	0–2	0–2	0–3	2–2	1–2	2–1	2–0	—	1–1	2–0	0–0	0–0	1–0	2–1	0–2	1–2	1–1	1–1
Altrincham	1–4	0–2	1–2	1–1	1–0	2–3	1–0	3–0	1–1	1–2	0–1	1–2	0–1	—	2–2	2–0	4–2	1–1	4–0	1–0	4–1	5–0	3–2
Woking	1–2	2–1	2–3	2–3	0–2	0–1	3–1	1–0	0–2	0–1	0–2	2–3	0–1	3–2	—	1–0	2–0	1–2	1–2	2–3	0–3	2–0	3–2
Maidenhead United	0–2	3–2	0–4	1–0	0–1	1–1	3–2	1–4	2–0	3–4	1–0	2–1	1–1	0–0	3–2	—	0–2	1–2	2–2	2–2	2–3	2–0	2–0
Wealdstone	1–4	1–2	0–0	0–1	0–0	1–0	1–2	1–2	2–0	1–1	1–1	0–0	2–1	1–0	1–2	0–0	—	1–0	1–2	2–2	2–1	3–2	2–1
Barnet	0–5	0–3	0–2	0–0	0–5	2–2	1–4	0–2	1–0	2–1	2–4	1–3	2–2	1–1	0–2	3–0	1–3	—	1–1	2–1	0–0	3–1	6–0
Eastleigh	0–2	0–2	0–0	1–2	2–0	4–4	0–1	0–1	1–1	2–1	0–2	1–1	0–0	2–1	3–2	1–0	4–1	2–3	—	0–3	3–3	3–2	4–1
Aldershot Town	0–2	0–5	1–2	0–1	3–1	2–1	0–2	0–2	2–1	1–0	2–3	1–1	1–2	2–2	1–1	1–1	1–3	1–3	0–2	—	0–3	0–2	0–0
King's Lynn Town	0–3	2–6	0–1	2–0	2–4	0–1	0–2	1–2	0–1	2–3	1–0	0–1	2–2	0–1	0–0	1–4	0–1	1–1	3–3	0–1	—	3–0	2–1
Weymouth	1–2	1–6	2–4	0–2	1–1	0–0	1–1	1–2	0–2	1–2	2–2	0–1	0–0	1–4	2–3	3–1	1–1	1–2	1–0	0–1	1–0	—	1–1
Dover Athletic	2–5	0–1	0–0	1–3	0–3	1–3	0–0	0–2	0–1	1–3	0–1	0–1	0–2	0–1	1–4	0–1	2–3	1–2	1–0	1–2	1–1	1–2	—

Source: National League Results Grid
Legend: Blue = home team win; Yellow = draw; Red = away team win.
For upcoming matches, an "a" indicates there is an article about the rivalry between the two participants.

=== Play-offs ===
Quarter-finals
5	Notts County	1
6	Grimsby Town (a.e.t.)	2
4	FC Halifax Town	1
7	Chesterfield	2

Semi-finals
2	Wrexham	4
6	Grimsby Town (a.e.t.)	5
3	Solihull Moors	3
7	Chesterfield	1

Final
3	Solihull Moors	1
6	Grimsby Town (a.e.t.)	2

==== Quarter-finals ====
23 May 2022	Notts County	1–2 (a.e.t.)	Grimsby Town	Nottingham
19:45	Rodrigues 73' (pen.)	Report	Holohan 90+6'; Dieseruvwe 119'	Stadium: Meadow Lane; Attendance: 12,023; Referee: Sunny Sukhvir Gill

24 May 2022	FC Halifax Town	1–2	Chesterfield	Halifax
19:45	Stenson 69'		Rowe 20'; King 66'	Stadium: The Shay; Attendance: 5,661

==== Semi-finals ====
28 May 2022	Wrexham	4–5 (a.e.t.)	Grimsby Town	Wrexham
12:30	Mullin 13' (pen.), 65'; Tozer 63'; Davies 80'	Report	McAtee 15'; Waterfall 47', 119'; Taylor 72'; Dieseruvwe 78'	Stadium: Racecourse Ground; Attendance: 9,734; Referee: Adam Herczeg

29 May 2022	Solihull Moors	3–1	Chesterfield	Solihull
12:30	Dallas 15'; Gudger 35'; Howe 59'	Report	Quigley 7'	Stadium: Damson Park; Attendance: 4,026; Referee: Thomas Kirk

==== Final ====
5 June 2022
15:00 BST

Solihull Moors	1–2 (a.e.t.)	Grimsby Town
Hudlin 45+1'	Report	McAtee 69'; Maguire-Drew 111'

London Stadium, London
Attendance: 22,897
Referee: Martin Woods

=== Top scorers ===
As of match played 15 May 2022

Rank	Player	Club	Goals
1	(England) Paul Mullin	Wrexham	26
2	(England) Kabongo Tshimanga	Chesterfield	24
3	(Republic of Ireland) Paddy Madden	Stockport County	23
4	(Scotland) Andrew Dallas	Solihull Moors	19
4	(Portugal) Rúben Rodrigues	Notts County	19
4	(England) Kyle Wootton	Notts County	19
7	(England) Paul McCallum	Dagenham & Redbridge	18
7	(England) Joe Sbarra	Solihull Moors	18
7	(England) Adam Marriott	Barnet	18
10	(England) Michael Cheek	Bromley	17
10	(England) Billy Waters	FC Halifax Town	17

=== Hat-tricks ===
Player	For	Against	Result	Date
(England) Kabongo Tshimanga	Chesterfield	Barnet	4–2	14 September 2021
(England) Danny Rowe	Chesterfield	Southend United	0–4	9 October 2021
(Colombia) Ángelo Balanta	Dagenham & Redbridge	Maidenhead United	1–4	13 November 2021
(England) Kabongo Tshimanga	Chesterfield	Weymouth	4–0	13 November 2021
(England) Oliver Crankshaw	Stockport County	Wealdstone	1–4	27 November 2021
(England) Callum Roberts	Notts County	King's Lynn Town	2–4	11 January 2022
(Scotland) Andrew Dallas^{5}	Solihull Moors	Dover Athletic	5–0	22 January 2022
(England) Joe Sbarra	Solihull Moors	Eastleigh	5–3	19 March 2022
(Germany) Michael Gyasi	Dover Athletic	Wrexham	6–5	26 March 2022
(Portugal) Rúben Rodrigues	Notts County	Southend United	0–3	2 April 2022
(Wales) Connor Lemonheigh-Evans	Torquay United	Notts County	5–1	9 April 2022
(Jamaica) Junior Morias	Dagenham & Redbridge	Barnet	7–3	15 April 2022
(England) Emmanuel Dieseruvwe	Grimsby Town	Eastleigh	4–4	15 April 2022

Notes

^{5} Player scored 5 goals

=== Monthly awards ===
Each month the Vanarama National League announces their official Player of the Month and Manager of the Month.

Month	Manager of the Month	Club	Player of the Month	Club
August/September 2021	(Republic of Ireland) Daryl McMahon	Dagenham & Redbridge	(England) Kabongo Tshimanga	Chesterfield
October 2021	(England) Neal Ardley	Solihull Moors	(England) Ryan Boot	Solihull Moors
November 2021	(England) Darren Sarll	Yeovil Town	(England) Paul Mullin	Wrexham
December 2021	(Republic of Ireland) Daryl McMahon	Dagenham & Redbridge	(England) Matty Warburton	FC Halifax Town
January 2022	(England) Dave Challinor	Stockport County	(Scotland) Andrew Dallas	Solihull Moors
February 2022	(England) Luke Garrard	Boreham Wood	(Belgium) Elisha Sam	Notts County
March 2022	(England) Phil Parkinson	Wrexham	(Republic of Ireland) Paddy Madden	Stockport County
April 2022	(England) Paul Hurst	Grimsby Town	(Jamaica) Junior Morias	Dagenham & Redbridge

== National League North ==
National League North
- Season: 2021–22
- Dates: 14 August 2021 – 7 May 2022
- Champions: Gateshead
- Promoted: Gateshead; York City
- Relegated: Guiseley

The National League North consisted of 22 teams for the final time.

=== Team changes ===
Following the COVID-19 pandemic-related cancellation of the four Step 3 leagues' 2020–21 seasons, no teams were promoted to or relegated from the National League North.

To National League North

Relegated from 2020–21 National League

- None

From National League North

Promoted to 2021–22 National League

- None

=== Stadia and locations ===
Locations of the National League North 2021–22 teams

Team	Location	Stadium	Capacity
AFC Fylde	Wesham	Mill Farm	6,000
AFC Telford United	Telford	New Bucks Head	6,300
Alfreton Town	Alfreton	North Street	3,600
Blyth Spartans	Blyth	Croft Park	4,435
Boston United	Boston	Boston Community Stadium	5,061
Brackley Town	Brackley	St. James Park	3,500
Bradford (Park Avenue)	Bradford	Horsfall Stadium	3,500
Chester	Chester	Deva Stadium	6,500
Chorley	Chorley	Victory Park	4,100
Curzon Ashton	Ashton-under-Lyne	Tameside Stadium	4,000
Darlington	Darlington	Blackwell Meadows	3,300
Farsley Celtic	Farsley	The Citadel	3,900
Gateshead	Gateshead	Gateshead International Stadium	11,800
Gloucester City	Gloucester	Meadow Park	3,600
Guiseley	Guiseley	Nethermoor Park	4,200
Hereford	Hereford	Edgar Street	5,213
Kettering Town	Kettering	Latimer Park (groundshare with Burton Park Wanderers)	2,400
Kidderminster Harriers	Kidderminster	Aggborough	6,238
Leamington	Leamington	New Windmill Ground	2,300
Southport	Southport	Haig Avenue	6,008
Spennymoor Town	Spennymoor	The Brewery Field	4,300
York City	York	York Community Stadium	8,500

=== Managerial changes ===
Team	Outgoing manager	Manner of departure	Date of vacancy	Position in table	Incoming manager	Date of appointment
Gloucester City	(England) Paul Groves	Sacked	25 September 2021	20th	(England) Lee Mansell	25 September 2021
AFC Telford United	(England) Gavin Cowan	Sacked	5 October 2021	20th	(England) Dennis Greene (caretaker)	28 October 2021
Curzon Ashton	(England) Steve Cunningham	Sacked	18 October 2021	6th	(England) Adam Lakeland	28 October 2021
York City	(England) Steve Watson	Sacked	13 November 2021	11th	(England) John Askey	13 November 2021
Blyth Spartans	(England) Michael Nelson	Sacked	17 November 2021	22nd	(England) Terry Mitchell	29 November 2021
AFC Telford United	(England) Dennis Greene	End of interim spell	21 November 2021	22nd	(England) Paul Carden	21 November 2021
Chester	(England) Anthony Johnson and (England) Bernard Morley	Sacked	24 November 2021	16th	(England) Steve Watson	23 December 2021
Spennymoor Town	(England) Tommy Miller	Sacked	5 December 2021	13th	(England) Anthony Johnson and (England) Bernard Morley	13 December 2021
Boston United	(England) Craig Elliott	Sacked	4 January 2022	7th	(England) Paul Cox	21 January 2022
Kettering Town	(England) Paul Cox	Signed by Boston United	21 January 2022	8th	(England) Ian Culverhouse	23 January 2022
Farsley Celtic	(England) Neil Ross	Sacked	27 January 2022	21st	(England) Russ Wilcox	9 February 2022
AFC Fylde	(England) Jim Bentley	Sacked	4 March 2022	4th	(England) James Rowe	7 March 2022

=== National League North table ===
Pos	Team	Pld	W	D	L	GF	GA	GD	Pts	Promotion, qualification or relegation
1	Gateshead (C, P)	42	29	7	6	99	47	+52	94	Promotion to National League
2	Brackley Town	42	25	12	5	53	23	+30	87	Qualification for the National League North play-off semi-finals
3	AFC Fylde	42	24	8	10	68	37	+31	80	Qualification for the National League North play-off semi-finals
4	Kidderminster Harriers	42	21	11	10	72	35	+37	74	Qualification for the National League North play-off quarter-finals
5	York City (O, P)	42	19	9	14	58	50	+8	66	Qualification for the National League North play-off quarter-finals
6	Chorley	42	17	14	11	62	49	+13	65	Qualification for the National League North play-off quarter-finals
7	Boston United	42	18	9	15	63	57	+6	63	Qualification for the National League North play-off quarter-finals
8	Kettering Town	42	16	13	13	54	48	+6	61	
9	Alfreton Town	42	17	10	15	58	59	−1	61	
10	Spennymoor Town	42	17	9	16	55	51	+4	60	
11	Southport	42	14	15	13	60	55	+5	57	
12	Hereford	42	15	10	17	51	52	−1	55	
13	Darlington	42	14	11	17	57	58	−1	53	
14	Curzon Ashton	42	13	13	16	51	63	−12	52	
15	Leamington	42	12	12	18	39	47	−8	48	
16	Chester	42	12	11	19	70	71	−1	47	
17	Gloucester City	42	10	16	16	47	60	−13	46	
18	Bradford (Park Avenue)	42	11	11	20	46	70	−24	44	
19	Blyth Spartans	42	12	7	23	41	76	−35	43	
20	AFC Telford United	42	7	16	19	48	65	−17	37	
21	Farsley Celtic	42	9	10	23	37	78	−41	37	
22	Guiseley (R)	42	9	8	25	31	69	−38	35	Relegation to the Northern Premier League Premier Division

Source: National League official site
Rules for classification: 1) Points; 2) Goal difference; 3) Number of goals scored; 4) Number of matches won; 5) Head-to-head results
(C) Champions; (O) Play-off winners; (P) Promoted; (R) Relegated

=== Results table ===
Home \ Away	GAT	BRA	FYL	KID	YOR	CHO	BOS	KET	ALF	SPE	SOU	HER	DAR	CUR	LEA	CHE	GLO	BPA	BLY	TEL	FAR	GUI
Gateshead	—	2–0	0–3	4–0	2–0	0–1	3–1	3–1	2–1	2–1	3–1	2–1	4–2	4–0	3–1	4–3	3–0	0–0	3–0	4–1	3–1	2–1
Brackley Town	1–0	—	1–0	1–0	1–0	0–0	0–1	1–0	1–0	2–0	1–0	1–0	1–3	0–0	2–1	0–0	1–0	3–0	0–1	2–1	3–2	1–0
AFC Fylde	2–0	3–3	—	2–1	0–2	1–2	1–0	0–0	3–0	2–0	2–1	2–1	1–2	0–1	1–0	3–1	1–0	2–0	4–1	1–1	3–1	2–1
Kidderminster Harriers	2–3	0–2	0–1	—	3–0	1–1	3–1	0–0	0–1	4–0	6–0	3–0	1–0	5–0	3–0	3–1	0–0	5–1	3–0	3–0	2–1	3–0
York City	1–1	1–2	2–1	1–2	—	1–1	0–1	1–2	1–0	1–0	3–1	0–1	3–1	0–0	1–0	1–0	1–1	0–3	4–0	3–1	4–2	3–0
Chorley	2–2	0–1	2–2	1–1	2–2	—	2–1	3–1	1–2	0–2	2–1	3–2	2–1	4–3	1–0	4–1	9–0	1–1	0–1	1–0	2–1	2–0
Boston United	1–2	1–3	1–3	1–2	2–1	2–2	—	3–2	2–3	1–2	1–1	2–0	2–0	2–1	1–1	4–0	1–1	2–1	1–1	4–1	3–0	2–1
Kettering Town	1–1	3–1	1–1	0–1	2–0	2–1	2–3	—	1–0	1–2	2–1	1–1	1–3	3–0	1–1	0–0	1–0	1–0	4–0	2–2	1–1	0–2
Alfreton Town	0–4	0–1	1–1	1–4	3–0	0–1	1–1	0–0	—	3–2	2–2	3–3	0–0	4–2	1–0	0–0	1–1	5–1	0–1	3–1	0–0	2–1
Spennymoor Town	1–2	1–1	0–1	0–0	1–3	2–0	1–1	2–1	0–2	—	3–2	1–0	1–1	2–2	1–0	4–2	0–0	0–2	3–0	1–0	6–0	2–1
Southport	3–3	0–0	0–0	1–1	3–3	0–0	4–1	0–1	2–0	1–1	—	2–0	3–0	0–0	1–1	3–2	2–2	1–0	2–3	1–1	4–0	2–1
Hereford	0–2	2–2	1–4	2–0	1–1	1–0	2–1	3–0	1–2	0–2	0–1	—	1–1	2–2	1–1	1–0	2–1	3–2	2–0	1–0	0–1	2–0
Darlington	1–3	0–2	1–0	0–1	1–2	3–0	2–1	0–1	2–3	1–1	1–0	1–0	—	0–2	1–1	2–1	2–2	1–2	1–0	3–0	1–1	5–1
Curzon Ashton	0–1	0–0	2–1	1–1	0–0	1–0	0–4	1–1	1–2	0–3	0–0	3–0	2–1	—	1–2	4–3	1–2	2–1	3–2	0–0	1–2	1–1
Leamington	2–1	0–0	0–2	2–0	2–0	2–1	2–0	0–4	1–2	2–1	1–1	0–0	0–1	0–3	—	3–0	0–1	1–1	1–0	2–2	3–0	1–0
Chester	1–1	1–1	2–2	2–2	0–1	1–2	4–0	4–0	3–2	0–2	5–0	2–3	2–2	0–3	2–1	—	3–2	4–0	5–1	1–1	1–0	0–1
Gloucester City	2–4	0–1	1–0	1–3	4–0	1–1	0–0	0–2	0–0	2–0	0–1	1–0	2–2	1–2	0–0	3–3	—	0–0	2–2	2–2	2–0	4–1
Bradford (Park Avenue)	2–4	0–3	0–2	0–0	2–4	0–0	1–2	2–1	5–0	1–1	0–5	1–1	0–0	2–3	2–1	1–0	1–2	—	2–1	3–2	1–0	0–0
Blyth Spartans	2–1	0–0	0–2	1–1	0–3	0–2	0–1	1–2	2–0	3–1	1–2	1–4	2–2	1–0	0–2	1–3	2–0	1–3	—	2–0	2–1	1–0
AFC Telford United	1–1	0–2	1–2	0–1	1–1	3–0	1–1	2–2	2–3	2–0	0–3	0–0	5–0	2–1	1–1	1–3	2–1	3–0	2–2	—	2–0	0–1
Farsley Celtic	3–4	0–0	1–0	2–1	0–2	3–3	0–2	1–1	0–3	1–2	2–0	0–4	0–6	2–0	1–0	2–2	1–2	1–0	1–1	1–1	—	1–0
Guiseley	0–6	0–5	2–4	0–0	0–1	0–0	0–1	0–2	3–2	1–0	0–2	0–2	1–0	2–2	2–0	0–2	2–1	2–2	3–1	0–0	0–0	—

Source: National League North results grid
Legend: Blue = home team win; Yellow = draw; Red = away team win.

=== Play-offs ===
Quarter-finals
5	York City	2
6	Chorley	1
4	Kidderminster Harriers	1
7	Boston United	2

Semi-finals
2	Brackley Town	0
5	York City	1
3	AFC Fylde	0
7	Boston United	2

Final
5	York City	2
7	Boston United	0

==== Quarter-finals ====
11 May 2022	York City	2–1	Chorley	Huntington, York
19:45	John-Lewis 10'; Hancox 49'		Hall 25'	Stadium: York Community Stadium; Attendance: 6,394

12 May 2022	Kidderminster Harriers	1–2	Boston United	Kidderminster
19:45	Hemmings 65'		Elliott 45'; Penny 76' (o.g.)	Stadium: Aggborough Stadium; Attendance: 3,921

==== Semi-finals ====
14 May 2022	Brackley Town	0–1	York City	Brackley
15:00			John-Lewis 44'	Stadium: St. James Park (Brackley); Attendance: 1,745

15 May 2022	AFC Fylde	0–2	Boston United	Wesham
15:00			Elliott 80', 90' (pen.)	Stadium: Mill Farm Sports Village; Attendance: 2,050

==== Final ====
21 May 2022
15:00

York City	2–0	Boston United
John-Lewis 5'; Kouhyar 86'	Report

York Community Stadium, Huntington, York
Attendance: 7,448

=== Top scorers ===
Rank	Player	Club	Goals
1	(England) Macaulay Langstaff	Gateshead	28
2	(England) Nick Haughton	AFC Fylde	26
3	(England) Glen Taylor	Spennymoor Town	25
4	(England) Cedwyn Scott	Gateshead	24
5	(England) Danny Elliott	Boston United	19
6	(England) Ashley Hemmings	Kidderminster Harriers	15
7	(England) Jordan McFarlane-Archer	Southport	14
7	(Zimbabwe) Lee Ndlovu	Brackley Town	14
7	(England) JJ O'Donnell	Blyth Spartans	14
10	(England) Jason Oswell	AFC Telford United	13
10	(England) Tom Owen-Evans	Hereford	13

=== Hat-tricks ===
Player	For	Against	Result	Date
(England) Glen Taylor	Spennymoor Town	Farsley Celtic	6–0	11 September 2021
(England) Marcus Carver	Southport	Boston United	4–1	13 November 2021
(England) Jack Lambert	Darlington	Farsley Celtic	0–6	8 January 2022
(England) Matt Lowe	Brackley Town	Guiseley	0–5	8 March 2022
(England) Alex Curran	Curzon Ashton	Bradford (Park Avenue)	2–3	12 March 2022
(England) Cedwyn Scott	Gateshead	Curzon Ashton	4–0	22 March 2022

=== Monthly awards ===
Each month the Vanarama National League announces their official Player of the Month and Manager of the Month.

Month	Manager of the Month	Club	Player of the Month	Club
August/September 2021	(England) Steve Cunningham	Curzon Ashton	(England) Nick Haughton	AFC Fylde
October 2021	(England) Steve Watson	York City	(England) Ashley Hemmings	Kidderminster Harriers
November 2021	(England) Russell Penn	Kidderminster Harriers	(Barbados) Krystian Pearce	Hereford
December 2021	(England) Mike Williamson	Gateshead	(England) Cam Mason	Southport
January 2022	(England) Russell Penn	Kidderminster Harriers	(England) Greg Olley	Gateshead
February 2022	(England) John Askey	York City	(Afghanistan) Maziar Kouhyar	Hereford
March 2022	(England) Kevin Wilkin	Brackley Town	(England) Cedwyn Scott	Gateshead
April 2022	(England) Billy Heath	Alfreton Town	(England) Sam Osborne	AFC Fylde

== National League South ==
National League South
- Season: 2021–22
- Dates: 14 August 2021 – 7 May 2022
- Champions: Maidstone United
- Promoted: Maidstone United; Dorking Wanderers
- Relegated: Billericay Town

The National League South consisted of 21 teams after the 2019–20 season and did so for the final time.

=== Team changes ===
Following the COVID-19 pandemic-related cancellation of the four Step 3 leagues' 2020–21 seasons, no teams were promoted to or relegated from the National League South.

To National League South

Relegated from 2020–21 National League

- None

From National League South

Promoted to 2021–22 National League

- None

=== Stadia and locations ===
Locations of the National League South 2021–22 teams (Greater London shown in more detail below)
Locations of the National League South 2021–22 teams (Greater London clubs)

Team	Location	Stadium	Capacity
Bath City	Bath (Twerton)	Twerton Park	8,840
Billericay Town	Billericay	New Lodge	3,500
Braintree Town	Braintree	Cressing Road	4,085
Chelmsford City	Chelmsford	Melbourne Stadium	3,019
Chippenham Town	Chippenham	Hardenhuish Park	3,000
Concord Rangers	Canvey Island	Thames Road	3,300
Dartford	Dartford	Princes Park	4,100
Dorking Wanderers	Dorking	Meadowbank Stadium	3,000
Dulwich Hamlet	London (East Dulwich)	Champion Hill	3,000
Eastbourne Borough	Eastbourne	Priory Lane	4,151
Ebbsfleet United	Northfleet	Stonebridge Road	4,800
Hampton & Richmond	London (Hampton)	Beveree Stadium	3,500
Havant & Waterlooville	Havant	West Leigh Park	5,300
Hemel Hempstead Town	Hemel Hempstead	Vauxhall Road	3,152
Hungerford Town	Hungerford	Bulpit Lane	2,500
Maidstone United	Maidstone	Gallagher Stadium	4,200
Oxford City	Oxford (Marston)	Court Place Farm	2,000
Slough Town	Slough	Arbour Park	2,000
St Albans City	St Albans	Clarence Park	4,500
Tonbridge Angels	Tonbridge	Longmead Stadium	3,000
Welling United	London (Welling)	Park View Road	4,000

=== Managerial changes ===
Team	Outgoing manager	Manner of departure	Date of vacancy	Position in table	Incoming manager	Date of appointment
Welling United	(Wales) Steve Lovell	Resigned	20 September 2021	19th	(England) Peter Taylor	28 September 2021
Hemel Hempstead Town	(England) Lee Bircham	Sacked	20 September 2021	21st	(England) Mark Jones	20 September 2021
Billericay Town	(England) Kevin Watson	Sacked	5 October 2021	21st	(England) Jody Brown	8 October 2021
Oxford City	(England) David Oldfield	Signed by Weymouth	18 January 2022	4th	(England) Ross Jenkins	9 March 2022
Welling United	(England) Peter Taylor	Sacked	13 March 2022	20th	(Northern Ireland) Warren Feeney	14 March 2022
Chippenham Town	(England) Mike Cook	Resigned	9 April 2022	11th	(England) Gary Horgan	11 April 2022
Billericay Town	(England) Jody Brown	Sacked	19 April 2022	21st	(England) Danny Brown (Interim)	19 April 2022

=== National League South table ===
Pos	Team	Pld	W	D	L	GF	GA	GD	Pts	Promotion, qualification or relegation
1	Maidstone United (C, P)	40	27	6	7	80	38	+42	87	Promotion to National League
2	Dorking Wanderers (O, P)	40	25	6	9	101	53	+48	81	Qualification for the National League South play-off semi-finals
3	Ebbsfleet United	40	24	4	12	78	53	+25	76	Qualification for the National League South play-off semi-finals
4	Dartford	40	21	11	8	75	42	+33	74	Qualification for the National League South play-off quarter-finals
5	Oxford City	40	19	12	9	71	46	+25	69	Qualification for the National League South play-off quarter-finals
6	Eastbourne Borough	40	17	9	14	73	67	+6	60	Qualification for the National League South play-off quarter-finals
7	Chippenham Town	40	16	11	13	61	50	+11	59	Qualification for the National League South play-off quarter-finals
8	Havant & Waterlooville	40	15	12	13	58	55	+3	57	
9	St Albans City	40	15	7	18	55	58	−3	52	
10	Dulwich Hamlet	40	13	12	15	63	60	+3	51	
11	Hampton & Richmond Borough	40	14	9	17	56	56	0	51	
12	Hungerford Town	40	15	4	21	59	68	−9	49	
13	Slough Town	40	12	13	15	51	69	−18	49	
14	Concord Rangers	40	13	10	17	53	72	−19	49	
15	Hemel Hempstead Town	40	13	9	18	49	72	−23	48	
16	Tonbridge Angels	40	11	12	17	43	53	−10	45	
17	Braintree Town	40	11	12	17	38	54	−16	45	
18	Bath City	40	13	6	21	45	68	−23	45	
19	Chelmsford City	40	9	14	17	46	53	−7	41	
20	Welling United	40	10	8	22	46	87	−41	38	
21	Billericay Town (R)	40	9	9	22	41	68	−27	36	Relegation to the Isthmian League Premier Division

Source: National League official site
Rules for classification: 1) Points; 2) Goal difference; 3) Number of goals scored; 4) Number of matches won; 5) Head-to-head results
(C) Champions; (O) Play-off winners; (P) Promoted; (R) Relegated

=== Results table ===
Home \ Away	MAI	DOR	EBB	DAR	OXF	EAB	CHI	H&W	STA	DUL	HAM	HUN	SLO	CON	HEM	TON	BRA	BAT	CHE	WEL	BIL
Maidstone United	—	0–2	4–0	4–0	2–1	0–2	1–0	4–0	3–2	2–0	2–1	3–2	0–1	2–2	4–2	2–0	1–0	2–1	3–1	4–1	1–0
Dorking Wanderers	1–0	—	5–1	1–0	1–0	4–3	3–0	8–0	3–2	4–3	2–2	1–2	5–0	7–2	2–1	1–3	2–1	4–1	2–0	3–1	2–1
Ebbsfleet United	2–3	1–1	—	1–0	3–1	2–0	2–2	1–2	5–0	2–1	1–0	1–2	1–2	2–1	3–1	5–1	2–0	3–0	2–1	6–0	0–0
Dartford	0–1	3–2	1–0	—	0–0	3–1	3–3	1–1	3–1	1–1	2–2	1–0	3–0	0–0	1–1	1–1	0–1	2–0	2–1	4–2	1–0
Oxford City	1–3	2–4	1–0	1–1	—	0–2	1–1	3–1	3–1	2–0	1–1	1–0	3–2	3–3	2–0	5–0	1–1	5–1	1–1	3–0	1–2
Eastbourne Borough	2–3	3–2	0–1	2–7	2–2	—	2–2	1–2	1–0	2–2	0–5	5–2	3–1	2–0	1–0	3–1	6–0	2–0	2–1	3–3	1–2
Chippenham Town	1–2	4–1	2–5	4–2	1–0	1–1	—	1–0	3–1	2–0	1–1	3–2	6–1	1–0	1–2	0–1	1–1	1–4	2–3	1–3	3–0
Havant & Waterlooville	0–0	1–3	4–2	0–1	1–2	3–0	0–2	—	0–1	2–2	3–0	4–0	1–2	5–2	0–0	1–1	4–0	1–3	2–1	3–0	2–2
St Albans City	0–0	1–0	0–1	1–3	1–1	2–1	1–1	1–0	—	3–4	3–0	1–3	1–0	0–1	1–3	2–3	0–1	3–2	0–3	5–0	4–1
Dulwich Hamlet	0–0	1–3	5–2	0–2	0–2	1–1	1–1	0–1	0–0	—	4–3	3–1	1–1	4–1	2–1	1–1	1–0	3–0	1–3	0–1	1–2
Hampton & Richmond Borough	1–1	1–2	3–0	0–1	0–3	1–2	0–0	1–2	0–0	2–1	—	2–0	3–1	2–1	0–1	0–0	2–4	4–0	4–2	2–1	2–0
Hungerford Town	3–2	1–1	3–4	2–1	0–1	2–3	0–3	1–1	0–2	3–1	3–0	—	1–1	1–0	0–1	1–3	2–0	0–3	2–1	1–2	1–4
Slough Town	2–1	2–1	1–3	0–6	2–2	2–2	0–1	1–1	2–3	1–2	4–1	2–2	—	1–1	2–0	2–1	0–2	2–0	1–0	2–1	1–1
Concord Rangers	1–5	1–0	1–2	1–0	1–2	2–1	0–3	3–1	2–1	2–2	2–1	1–4	1–1	—	1–0	1–1	2–2	3–1	1–3	2–1	0–0
Hemel Hempstead Town	0–4	2–2	1–3	2–3	0–4	2–2	0–2	0–0	0–2	0–6	1–0	1–0	2–2	3–1	—	4–3	0–3	3–1	2–2	1–1	2–1
Tonbridge Angels	0–1	3–1	0–1	2–3	0–2	2–0	2–0	0–1	0–0	2–2	1–1	2–1	0–1	2–3	1–1	—	0–0	0–1	1–1	1–0	2–0
Braintree Town	1–2	2–2	1–0	2–2	1–1	0–0	1–0	0–2	0–2	1–2	0–1	1–0	1–0	0–1	3–1	1–0	—	1–3	2–2	2–2	0–1
Bath City	0–3	0–2	0–2	1–3	3–3	2–1	2–0	0–0	0–2	0–0	1–3	0–1	1–1	2–1	2–1	1–0	0–0	—	1–2	2–1	3–0
Chelmsford City	1–2	2–2	0–0	0–0	1–2	0–1	0–0	2–3	1–1	0–2	1–0	0–2	1–1	1–1	1–2	1–1	3–0	1–0	—	0–0	2–1
Welling United	3–2	0–4	2–4	0–6	0–1	0–2	1–0	2–2	2–3	1–3	2–3	1–4	2–2	2–1	1–2	1–0	1–0	1–1	1–0	—	1–0
Billericay Town	1–1	0–5	1–2	0–2	3–1	2–5	0–1	1–1	2–1	2–0	0–1	1–4	2–1	1–3	2–3	0–1	2–2	1–2	0–0	2–2	—

Source: National League official site
Legend: Blue = home team win; Yellow = draw; Red = away team win.

=== Play-offs ===
Quarter-finals
5	Oxford City	2
6	Eastbourne Borough	0
4	Dartford	0 (2)
7	Chippenham Town (p)	0 (3)

Semi-finals
2	Dorking Wanderers	3
5	Oxford City	0
3	Ebbsfleet United (a.e.t.)	1
7	Chippenham Town	0

Final
2	Dorking Wanderers (a.e.t.)	3
3	Ebbsfleet United	2

==== Quarter-finals ====
11 May 2022	Oxford City	2–0	Eastbourne Borough	Marston, Oxford
19:45	Benyon 23'; Harmon 76'	Report		Stadium: Court Place Farm; Attendance: 1,349

12 May 2022	Dartford	0–0 (2–3 p)	Chippenham Town	Dartford, Kent
19:45				Stadium: Princes Park; Attendance: 1,325; Referee: Callum Walchester
	Penalties
	Allen (penalty missed); Azeez (penalty missed); Campbell (penalty scored); Greenidge (penalty scored); Durojaiye (penalty missed)		(penalty missed) Young; (penalty scored) Mehew; (penalty missed) Greenslade; (penalty scored) Coppin; (penalty scored) Santos

==== Semi-finals ====
14 May 2022	Dorking Wanderers	3–0	Oxford City	Dorking
15:00	Prior 8'; Fuller 19'; Rutherford 48'			Stadium: Meadowbank Stadium; Attendance: 2,468

15 May 2022	Ebbsfleet United	1–0 (a.e.t.)	Chippenham Town	Northfleet
15:00	Martin 97'			Stadium: Stonebridge Road; Attendance: 2,166

==== Final ====
21 May 2022
15:00

Dorking Wanderers	3–2 (a.e.t.)	Ebbsfleet United
McShane 42'; Moore 90+9'; rutherford 97'		Bingham 22'; Tanner 90+2'

Meadowbank Stadium, Dorking
Attendance: 3,000

=== Top scorers ===
Rank	Player	Club	Goals
1	(England) Alfie Rutherford	Dorking Wanderers	30
2	(England) Shaun Jeffers	St. Albans City	27
2	(England) Ryan Seager	Hungerford Town	27
4	(England) Charley Kendall	Eastbourne Borough	25
5	(England) Joe Iaciofano	Oxford City	22
6	(Spain) Joan Luque	Maidstone United	20
7	(England) Dipo Akinyemi	Welling United	18
7	(England) Jack Barham	Maidstone United	18
9	(Saint Lucia) Dominic Poleon	Ebbsfleet United	17
9	(England) Alex Fletcher	Bath City	17

=== Hat-tricks ===
Player	For	Against	Result	Date
(Belgium) Simo Mbonkwi	Hungerford Town	Welling United	1–4	14 August 2021
(Saint Lucia) Dominic Poleon	Ebbsfleet United	Tonbridge Angels	5–1	14 August 2021
(England) Luke Holness	Braintree Town	Hemel Hempstead Town	0–3	21 August 2021
(England) Shaun Jeffers	St Albans City	Welling United	5–0	28 August 2021
(Saint Lucia) Dominic Poleon	Ebbsfleet United	Chippenham Town	2–5	28 September 2021
(England) Shaun Jeffers	St Albans City	Billericay Town	4–1	26 October 2021
(England) Jake McCarthy	Havant & Waterlooville	Chelmsford City	2–3	30 October 2021
(England) Ryan Seager	Hungerford Town	Maidstone United	3–2	30 October 2021
(England) Charley Kendall	Eastbourne Borough	Slough Town	3–1	20 November 2021
(England) Harry Parsons	Chippenham Town	Dorking Wanderers	4–1	4 December 2021
(England) Jack Barham	Maidstone United	Dartford	4–0	11 December 2021
(England) Alfie Rutherford	Dorking Wanderers	Oxford City	2–4	14 December 2021
(England) Alfie Rutherford	Dorking Wanderers	Havant & Waterlooville	8–0	26 December 2021
(England) Alfie Rutherford	Dorking Wanderers	Dulwich Hamlet	1–3	18 January 2022
(England) Matt Briggs	Dorking Wanderers	Ebbsfleet United	5–1	22 January 2022
(England) Jack Barham	Maidstone United	Eastbourne Borough	2–3	12 February 2022
(England) Jack Barham	Maidstone United	Havant & Waterlooville	4–0	2 April 2022
(England) Nana Kyei	Concord Rangers	Bath City	3–1	9 April 2022
(England) Alfie Rutherford	Dorking Wanderers	Welling United	0–4	18 April 2022
(England) Alfie Rutherford^{4}	Dorking Wanderers	Concord Rangers	7–2	23 April 2022

Notes

^{4} Player scored 4 goals

=== Monthly awards ===
Each month the Vanarama National League announces their official Player of the Month and Manager of the Month.

Month	Manager of the Month	Club	Player of the Month	Club
August/September 2021	(England) Steve King	Dartford	(England) Adebayo Azeez	Dartford
October 2021	(Germany) Dennis Kutrieb	Ebbsfleet United	(England) Shaun Jeffers	St Albans City
November 2021	(England) Gavin Rose	Dulwich Hamlet	(England) Joe Newton	Havant & Waterlooville
December 2021	(England) Hakan Hayrettin	Maidstone United	(England) Alfie Rutherford	Dorking Wanderers
January 2022	(England) Marc White	Dorking Wanderers	(England) Joe Ellul	Maidstone United
February 2022	(England) Ryan Maxwell	Braintree Town	(England) Marcus Dinanga	Dartford
March 2022	(England) Danny Bloor	Eastbourne Borough	(England) Jack Barham	Maidstone United
April 2022	(England) Hakan Hayrettin	Maidstone United	(England) Alfie Rutherford	Dorking Wanderers
