= Holroyd =

Holroyd may refer to:

== People ==
- Holroyd (surname)

== Places ==
- Holroyd, New South Wales, a suburb of Sydney, Australia
- Holroyd River, a locality in the Shire of Cook, Queensland, Australia
- City of Holroyd, a defunct local government area in western Sydney, Australia

== Other uses ==
- Holroyd v Marshall, a 1862 judicial decision of the House of Lords, U.K.
- Holroyd High School, Greystanes, New South Wales
- Holroyd River, Cape York Peninsula, Queensland, Australia

== See also ==
- Holyrood (disambiguation)
