= Daryl McMahon =

Irish footballer and manager (born 1983)

Personal information
- Full name: Daryl McMahon
- Date of birth: 10 October 1983 (age 43)
- Place of birth: Dublin, Ireland
- Height: 5 ft 11 in (1.80 m)
- Position: Midfielder

Team information
- Current team: Hornchurch (manager)

Youth career
- Cherry Orchard
- Belvedere
- 1998–2002: West Ham United

Senior career*
Years	Team	Apps	(Gls)
2002–2004	West Ham United	0	(0)
2004	→ Torquay United (loan)	1	(0)
2004	Port Vale	5	(0)
2004–2007	Leyton Orient	65	(5)
2006–2007	→ Notts County (loan)	7	(0)
2007–2009	Stevenage Borough	62	(7)
2009	Cambridge United	9	(0)
2009–2011	Farnborough	75	(11)
2011–2012	Boreham Wood	10	(0)
2012	Eastleigh	24	(3)
2012–2013	Dover Athletic	28	(3)
2013–2015	Ebbsfleet United	66	(14)
2015	Boreham Wood	11	(0)
2025	Hornchurch	1	(0)
Total		364	(43)

International career
1999–2000	Republic of Ireland U16	4	(1)
- Republic of Ireland U17
- Republic of Ireland U18

Managerial career
- 2014: Ebbsfleet United (caretaker)
- 2015–2018: Ebbsfleet United
- 2019–2020: Macclesfield Town
- 2020–2023: Dagenham & Redbridge
- 2024–: Hornchurch
- * Club domestic league appearances and goals

Daryl McMahon (born 10 October 1983) is an Irish professional football manager and former player who is manager of National League club Hornchurch.

McMahon represented the Republic of Ireland Under-16 team at the 2000 UEFA European Under-16 Football Championship. Starting as a midfielder his career at West Ham United, he switched to Port Vale in 2004 after failing to make a first-team appearance for West Ham. Later in the year, he moved on to Leyton Orient, where he would remain for three years. He then spent two seasons at Stevenage Borough, moving on to Cambridge United and then Farnborough in 2009. Two years later, he moved on to Boreham Wood, and seven months later, he moved to Eastleigh. He has also played for Torquay United and Notts County on loan. He switched to Dover Athletic in September 2012 before signing for Ebbsfleet United in June 2013. He rejoined Boreham Wood in January 2015 before returning to Ebbsfleet as manager three months later.

He managed Ebbsfleet from April 2015 to November 2018 and won promotion out of the National League South play-offs in 2017. He was appointed as manager of English Football League side Macclesfield Town in August 2019 but tendered his resignation in January 2020 amidst a financial crisis at the club. He then took charge at National League side Dagenham & Redbridge, remaining at the club until February 2023. He took charge at Hornchurch in January 2024 and led the club to the Isthmian League Premier Division title at the end of the 2023–24 season and to promotion out of the National League South play-offs in 2026.

== Playing career ==
=== West Ham United ===
McMahon started his youth career at the age of seven with Neilstown Rangers, before moving on to Cherry Orchard and then Belvedere. McMahon then began his career as a trainee with West Ham United, turning professional in August 2002. In need of first-team experience, he joined League Two Torquay United on loan in March 2004, making his debut as a late substitute for Martin Gritton in the 2–2 home draw with Yeovil Town on 3 April 2004. However, that was to be his only game for the "Gulls" as he returned to West Ham two weeks early, seemingly at his own request.

=== Port Vale ===
He was released by West Ham at the end of the 2003–04 season and joined Martin Foyle's League One Port Vale on non-contract terms in September 2004. He struggled to establish himself at Vale Park. He dropped down a division to join Leyton Orient on a free transfer two months later, after rejecting a further short-term deal at Port Vale. Teammate Dean Smith had set up the move to Brisbane Road and would himself join Orient soon after.

=== Leyton Orient ===
After impressing on a non-contract basis, he signed a six-month deal with Leyton Orient in January 2005. He played 33 games of the "O's" promotion winning campaign of 2005–06 but fell out of favour the following season and joined Notts County, back in League Two, on loan in November 2006. After his loan spell finished the following January, McMahon joined Conference National club Stevenage Borough.

=== Non-League ===
A fairly regular member of the first team at Broadhall Way, he was a sub in the FA Trophy final at Wembley. In May 2008, he signed a two-year contract with the club. On 26 November 2008, he was transfer listed by Borough, along with teammate John Martin, and in the January 2009 transfer window McMahon agreed to join fellow Conference Premier club Cambridge United.

He made his debut in a 4–1 win over Woking at the Abbey Stadium, but struggled to hold down a place in the team. He was an unused substitute in the 2009 Conference Premier play-off final, as he watched his United teammates lose their second play-off final in as many years. On 16 July 2009, caretaker Cambridge United manager, Paul Carden, announced that McMahon has left the club. He then joined Farnborough for a two-year stay. He enjoyed promotion to the Conference South with the club, as they were crowned champions of the Southern Football League Premier Division in 2009–10. The following year he helped the club to the Conference South play-off final, where they were defeated 4–2 by Ebbsfleet United. In June 2011, he signed for Boreham Wood as a player-coach on a two-year contract. McMahon's stay at Boreham Wood lasted seven months, as in January 2012 he signed for fellow Conference South club Eastleigh for an undisclosed fee. The "Spitfires" went on to post a mid-table finish in 2011–12.

He was sold to league rivals Dover Athletic for an undisclosed fee in September 2012. Eastleigh manager Richard Hill had rejected two bids from the "Whites", before Dover boss Nicky Forster put in a bid that Eastleigh director Stewart Donald felt "matched our valuation" and represented "good value". He played in the 3–2 play-off final defeat to Salisbury City on 12 May 2013.

In June 2013, he signed for Ebbsfleet United for a fee of £13,000. He became a key part of the club's passing style, but credited the club's success to manager Steve Brown. The "Fleet" finished fourth in 2013–14 and reached the play-off final, where they were beaten 1–0 by Dover Athletic; this was McMahon's fourth play-off final defeat in six years. He did, though, play in the Kent Senior Cup final, which ended in a 4–0 victory over Dover. He re-signed with Boreham Wood in January 2015 on a contract lasting until summer 2017. He was also coaching at Tottenham Hotspur and managing Ebbsfleet United, before he retired as a player at the end of the 2014–15 season.

== Management career ==
=== Ebbsfleet United ===
McMahon took charge at Conference South club Ebbsfleet United on a caretaker basis for three games in November 2014, winning two games and drawing one game in the period following the departure of Steve Brown and the appointment of Jamie Day. He was given a two-year management contract at the club in April 2015. He led the club to a second-place finish in the 2015–16 season, however, his record of play-off disappointment continued into his management career as Ebbsfleet went on to lose to Maidstone United on penalties in the play-off final. The "Fleet" again finished second in the 2016–17 season, finishing only two points behind champions Maidenhead United. He was named as Manager of the Month for January 2017 after Ebbslfeet won all four of their league games against Dartford, Chelmsford City, Poole Town and Wealdstone. However, they made up for their previous season's defeat and justified their 96-point finish after coming from 1–0 down with ten men to record a 2–1 victory over Chelmsford City in the play-off final at Stonebridge Road.

He signed a new five-year contract with the club in May 2017. He was named as National League Manager of the Month for February 2018 after four successive victories took them to the cusp of the play-offs. However, after a poor March he admitted that the focus had turned to building a promotion campaign for the following season. A late surge saw them qualify for the play-offs at the end of the 2017–18 season, though they were then beaten 4–2 by Tranmere Rovers at the semi-final stage. He left the club by "mutual consent" on 7 November 2018.

=== Macclesfield Town ===
On 19 August 2019, McMahon was appointed as manager of EFL League Two club Macclesfield Town, succeeding Sol Campbell. He got off to a good start on the pitch, however, the "Silkmen" squad released a statement to say they had gone unpaid for the month of September as HM Revenue and Customs delivered the club a winding up petition. He resigned on 2 January 2020 after financial problems resulted in players striking, which left the club unable to fulfill fixtures and punished with a six-point deduction.

=== Dagenham & Redbridge ===
Within 24 hours of leaving Macclesfield, McMahon was appointed as manager of National League side Dagenham & Redbridge. The season was suspended on 26 March due to the COVID-19 pandemic in England and no further matches were played; Dagenham were 18th in the table at the time. They finished the 2020–21 season in 12th-place, which McMahon saw as evidence the club was building in the right direction. After six wins in the first two months of the season, McMahon was awarded the league's Manager of the Month award for August/September 2021. He won the award for a second time for December 2021 after a 100% record across the month. Dagenham ended the 2021–22 season in eighth-place, missing out on the play-offs by a single point despite beating runners-up Wrexham on the final day. In May 2022, he was reported to be a contender for the vacant management position at AFC Wimbledon. On 24 February 2023, Dagenham parted company with McMahon with the side sitting in tenth position, five points off of the play-offs.

=== Coaching ===
In September 2023, McMahon joined former club Leyton Orient as a development and set-piece coach. However, he left the club three months later.

=== Hornchurch ===
On 29 January 2024, McMahon was appointed manager of Isthmian League Premier Division leaders Hornchurch. Following his appointment, the club maintained their impressive form throughout the 2023–24 season, being crowned champions with five matches remaining on 6 April. Hornchurch finished ninth in the National League South at the end of the 2024–25 season. He signed a new three-year contract in May 2025 after chairman Alex Sharp judged him to be "the best manager outside of the Football League".

He was again named as National League South Manager of the Month after his team won five of their six games in August 2025. The club were the surprise leaders of the division after three months. They ended the 2025–26 season in second place. Hornchurch defeated Torquay United by three goals to two in the play-off final to secure promotion into the National League for the first time in the club's history. He was nominated for the National League South Manager of the Season award.

He was again named as National League Manager of the Month after his team won four of their first five games in their new division.

== Personal life ==
McMahon is married to Alex, a stockbroker, and they share three children.

== Career statistics ==
=== Playing statistics ===
Appearances and goals by club, season and competition
Club	Season	League			FA Cup		League Cup		Other		Total	
Club	Season	Division	Apps	Goals	Apps	Goals	Apps	Goals	Apps	Goals	Apps	Goals
West Ham United	2002–03	Premier League	0	0	0	0	0	0	—		0	0
West Ham United	2003–04	First Division	0	0	0	0	0	0	0	0	0	0
West Ham United	Total		0	0	0	0	0	0	0	0	0	0
Torquay United (loan)	2003–04	Third Division	1	0	0	0	0	0	0	0	1	0
Port Vale	2004–05	League One	5	0	0	0	0	0	1 (Note: Appearance(s) in the EFL Trophy.)	0	6	0
Leyton Orient	2004–05	League Two	24	3	1	0	0	0	0	0	25	3
Leyton Orient	2005–06	League Two	33	2	4	0	1	1	2	0	40	3
Leyton Orient	2006–07	League One	8	0	0	0	1	0	0	0	9	0
Leyton Orient	Total		65	5	5	0	2	1	2	0	74	6
Notts County (loan)	2006–07	League Two	7	0	0	0	0	0	0	0	7	0
Stevenage Borough	2006–07	Conference National	12	0	0	0	—		4 (Note: Appearance(s) in the FA Trophy.)	1	16	1
Stevenage Borough	2007–08	Conference Premier	37	7	1	0	—		0	0	38	7
Stevenage Borough	2008–09	Conference Premier	13	0	1	0	—		0	0	14	0
Stevenage Borough	Total		62	7	2	0	0	0	4	1	68	8
Cambridge United	2008–09	Conference Premier	9	0	0	0	—		0	0	9	0
Farnborough	2009–10	Southern League	37	7	5	0	—		4	2	46	9
Farnborough	2010–11	Conference South	38	4	2	0	—		0	0	40	4
Farnborough	Total		75	11	7	0	0	0	4	2	86	13
Boreham Wood	2011–12	Conference South	10	0	0	0	—		1	0	11	0
Eastleigh	2011–12	Conference South	16	3	0	0	—		0	0	16	3
Eastleigh	2012–13	Conference South	8	0	0	0	—		0	0	8	0
Eastleigh	Total		24	3	0	0	0	0	0	0	24	3
Dover Athletic	2012–13	Conference South	28	3	0	0	—		0	0	28	3
Ebbsfleet United	2013–14	Conference South	43	9	2	0	—		3	1	48	10
Ebbsfleet United	2014–15	Conference South	23	5	2	0	—		3	1	28	6
Ebbsfleet United	Total		66	14	4	0	0	0	6	2	76	16
Boreham Wood	2014–15	Conference South	11	0	0	0	—		0	0	11	0
Hornchurch	2024–25	National League South	1	0	0	0	—		0	0	1	0
Career total			364	43	18	0	2	1	18	5	402	49

=== Managerial statistics ===
As of match played 21 November 2026

Managerial record by team and tenure
Team	From	To	Record					Ref
Team	From	To	P	W	D	L	Win %	Ref
Ebbsfleet United (caretaker)	26 November 2014	14 December 2014	3	2	1	0	66.67	
Ebbsfleet United	21 April 2015	7 November 2018	176	91	49	36	51.70	
Macclesfield Town	19 August 2019	2 January 2020	25	4	12	9	16.00	
Dagenham & Redbridge	3 January 2020	24 February 2023	143	64	27	52	44.76	
Hornchurch	29 January 2024	Present	186	98	37	51	52.69	
Total			529	255	126	148	48.20	—

== Honours ==
=== Playing honours ===
Leyton Orient

- League Two third-place promotion: 2005–06

Stevenage Borough

- FA Trophy: 2006–07

Farnborough

- Southern Football League Premier Division: 2009–10

Ebbsfleet United

- Kent Senior Cup: 2014

=== Managerial honours ===
Ebbsfleet United

- National League South play-offs: 2017

Hornchurch

- Isthmian League Premier Division: 2023–24
- National League South play-offs: 2026

Individual

- National League Manager of the Month: February 2018, August/September 2021, December 2021, August 2026
- National League South Manager of the Month: January 2017, August 2025
