= John Holroyd =

John Holroyd may refer to:

- John Holroyd (cricketer) (1907–1975), English sportsman
- John Holroyd (civil servant) (1935–2014), English government official
