= Chris Holroyd =

English footballer (born 1986)

Personal information
- Full name: Christopher Holroyd
- Date of birth: 24 October 1986 (age 40)
- Place of birth: Macclesfield, England
- Height: 5 ft 11 in (1.80 m)
- Positions: Winger; striker

Youth career
- 2003–2005: Crewe Alexandra
- 2005–2006: Chester City

Senior career*
Years	Team	Apps	(Gls)
2006–2008	Chester City	46	(4)
2008–2010	Cambridge United	59	(22)
2010–2011	Brighton & Hove Albion	16	(0)
2010	→ Stevenage (loan)	12	(6)
2011	→ Bury (loan)	4	(1)
2011–2012	Rotherham United	15	(1)
2012–2013	Preston North End	20	(1)
2012–2013	→ Macclesfield Town (loan)	19	(7)
2013	Morecambe	16	(1)
2013–2017	Macclesfield Town	160	(25)
2017–2019	Wrexham	60	(16)
2019–2020	Chorley	27	(6)
2020	Stalybridge Celtic	3	(0)
2020	Warrington Town	2	(0)
Total		459	(90)
- * Club domestic league appearances and goals

Christopher Holroyd (born 24 October 1986) is an English former professional footballer. Initially deployed solely as a striker, he was later also utilised as a winger.

Holroyd began his career at Crewe Alexandra, progressing through the club's youth system before joining Chester City for the final year of his scholarship. He signed professional terms in 2006 but left the club by mutual consent in July 2008, with a year remaining on his contract. The following month, Holroyd joined Conference Premier club Cambridge United. After scoring 15 goals during the first half of the 2009–10 season, Holroyd signed for League One club Brighton & Hove Albion in January 2010 for an undisclosed fee. He struggled for game time at Brighton and spent time on loan at Stevenage and Bury. At the end of the 2010–11 season, Holroyd was released by Brighton, and signed for Rotherham United in June 2011.

He moved to League One club Preston North End for an undisclosed fee in January 2012. At the start of the 2012–13 season, he joined Macclesfield Town on loan until January 2013. Upon returning to Preston, his contract was cancelled by mutual consent, and he signed for League Two club Morecambe on a free transfer in January 2013. Holroyd rejoined Macclesfield at the end of the season and went on to make 170 appearances over four years with the club. He then spent two years at National League club Wrexham, followed by a year at Chorley for the 2019–20 season. He had brief spells with Stalybridge Celtic and Warrington Town in 2020 before retiring later that year.

== Career ==
=== Early career ===
Holroyd began his career at Crewe Alexandra, spending five years at the club as a schoolboy and a further two years as a scholar at the club's youth academy. He was not offered a professional contract ahead of his third year of scholarship and subsequently joined Chester City. After scoring 21 goals in 28 appearances for Chester's youth team in the Football League Youth Alliance, he signed professional terms in 2006. Holroyd made his first-team debut for Chester at the start of the 2006–07 season, coming on as a 75th-minute substitute in Chester's 2–1 home defeat to Wrexham.

The following season, Holroyd scored his first goal in competitive football in a 4–2 Football League Trophy defeat to Carlisle United on 9 October 2007. Later that month, he registered his first Football League goal in Chester's 2–2 draw against Wycombe Wanderers. He made 26 appearances in all competitions during the 2007–08 season, scoring five goals. In July 2008, Holroyd was transfer-listed by Chester in an attempt to reduce the size of their squad. The following day, he left the club by mutual consent, with one year remaining on his contract, and was subsequently linked with moves elsewhere. During this period, Holroyd declined the opportunity to trial with AFC Bournemouth.

=== Cambridge United ===
Holroyd signed for Conference Premier club Cambridge United on 13 August 2008 on a one-year contract, with an option for a further year. Holroyd made his debut for Cambridge in the club's 3–0 away victory against Eastbourne Borough, scoring five minutes after coming on as a 79th-minute substitute. After his goalscoring debut, he went 16 matches without a goal before ending the run in a 4–0 victory over Salisbury City in December 2008. Holroyd featured in all three of Cambridge's play-off matches that season, including an appearance as an 80th-minute substitute in the 2–0 defeat to Torquay United in the final. He made 43 appearances in all competitions, scoring ten goals. In May 2009, the club exercised the option to extend his contract for a further year.

Ahead of the 2009–10 season, Holroyd was assigned the number nine shirt following the departure of Scott Rendell. He scored his first professional hat-trick four days later in a 4–2 victory over former club Chester City, a match in which Cambridge came from two goals behind. Holroyd scored 15 goals during the first half of the 2009–10 season, prompting assistant manager Paul Carden to state that he expected Holroyd to leave during the January transfer window. His final appearance for Cambridge came in a 1–0 home defeat to Eastbourne Borough.

=== Brighton & Hove Albion ===
Holroyd joined League One club Brighton & Hove Albion on 29 January 2010. An undisclosed fee was agreed with Cambridge on 22 January, but the transfer was delayed due to protracted negotiations over personal terms. The delay led to speculation that the deal had collapsed. Holroyd made his Brighton debut the day after signing, which Holroyd described as "a surprise", coming on as a 64th-minute substitute in a 1–0 defeat to Millwall. He made 13 appearances during the remainder of the 2009–10 season, without scoring. He featured only twice in the 2010–11 season, with competition for places increasing following the arrival of Francisco Sandaza. Brighton manager Gus Poyet stated Holroyd would benefit regular football elsewhere in order to re-establish himself as a regular first-team player. In May 2011, the club announced that he would be released upon the expiry of his contract.

==== Stevenage and Bury loans ====
Holroyd subsequently joined League Two club Stevenage on a three-month loan deal on 24 September 2010. He made his debut the following day, scoring the only goal of the game in a 1–0 victory over Lincoln City at Sincil Bank. Three days later, Holroyd scored a hat-trick in Stevenage's 4–1 win against Hereford United. After the match, Stevenage manager Graham Westley stated: "He's lethal, we knew that before he came to the club. He's been very impressive in his two games so far, his work ethic is excellent and he is a constant menace for opposition defences". Holroyd returned to Brighton on 26 December 2010, having scored six goals in 12 matches during the loan spell.

Having made only three further substitute appearances at Brighton, Holroyd joined League Two club Bury on loan on 11 March 2011, for the remainder of the 2010–11 season. Holroyd made his debut the following day, coming on as a 69th-minute substitute in a goalless draw against Rotherham United, and scored three days later a 2–1 home defeat to Torquay United. Holroyd was recalled by Brighton on 11 April 2011, having made four appearances and scored once during his loan spell.

=== Rotherham United ===
After being released by Brighton, Holroyd signed for League Two club Rotherham United on 20 June 2011 on a free transfer, agreeing a two-year contract. He made his debut on the opening day of the 2011–12 season, playing 72 minutes in a 1–0 home win against Oxford United. Holroyd scored his only goal for Rotherham in a 2–0 home victory over Aldershot Town on 5 November 2011, scoring a glancing header as the club ended a ten-game winless run. He made 19 appearances during the first half of the season, including six starts.

=== Preston North End ===
Holroyd joined League One club Preston North End for an undisclosed fee on 20 January 2012, reuniting with manager Graham Westley, who had previously signed him on loan at Stevenage. He made his debut the following day in a 2–0 home defeat to Leyton Orient, playing as a right winger and earning the club's Man of the Match award. Holroyd scored his only goal for Preston on 21 April 2012, heading in a Danny Mayor cross in a 1–1 draw away at Oldham Athletic. He made 20 appearances during his time at Preston.

In August 2012, Holroyd joined his hometown club Macclesfield Town of the Conference Premier on loan until January 2013. He made a scoring debut for the club, coming on as a substitute to score with his first touch in a 3–2 victory against Lincoln City. During his loan, Holroyd scored nine goals in 23 appearances, including a hat-trick in a 4–3 win against Stockport County at Edgeley Park. Upon returning to Preston in January 2013, Holroyd was informed he was not in the club's plans, and his contract was mutually terminated ahead of its June 2013 expiry.

=== Morecambe ===
Available on a free transfer following his loan spell at Macclesfield Town, Holroyd attracted interest from the club; however, no permanent deal was reached. He subsequently signed for League Two club Morecambe on 17 January 2013, on a contract running until the end of the 2012–13 season. Holroyd made his debut the following day, coming on as a second-half substitute in a 0–0 home draw against Cheltenham Town. He scored once in 16 appearances before leaving the club upon the expiry of his contract in June 2013.

=== Macclesfield Town ===
Holroyd rejoined hometown club, Macclesfield Town, on 19 June 2013, becoming manager John Askey's first signing following his appointment. He scored seven goals in 42 appearances during his debut season, and signed a one-year contract extension in July 2014. During the 2014–15 season, Holroyd was predominantly deployed as a right winger, scoring four goals in 40 matches as Macclesfield missed out on a play-off place by a single point. He signed a further one-year contract on 5 June 2015. He continued to feature as a winger during the 2015–16 season, before reverting to a more central striking role for the 2016–17 season, in which he scored 14 goals in 52 appearances. That season, he helped Macclesfield reach the FA Trophy final, playing the full 90 minutes in a 3–2 defeat to York City at Wembley Stadium on 21 May 2017. He declined a contract extension and departed the club upon the expiry of his contract.

=== Wrexham ===
Two days after Macclesfield's FA Trophy final defeat, Holroyd signed for fellow National League club Wrexham on 23 May 2017. He sustained a dislocated shoulder on his debut in Wrexham's 1–0 home defeat to former club Macclesfield on the opening day of the 2017–18 season. Holroyd returned to the first team five weeks later, scoring his first goal for the club in a 1–0 away victory against Tranmere Rovers on 23 September 2017. He missed the final four matches of the season due to a toe injury, but finished the campaign as Wrexham's leading goalscorer with 13 goals in 34 appearances, including a hat-trick in a 4–0 win over Torquay United at the Racecourse Ground. He signed a contract extension on 15 May 2018.

A hamstring injury disrupted the start of Holroyd's 2018–19 season, and he found starting opportunities limited throughout the campaign. He scored four goals in 30 appearances as Wrexham were defeated in the play-off quarter-finals by Eastleigh. Holroyd was released by the club upon the expiry of his contract in June 2019. Reflecting on his time at Wrexham, he described it as "one of the happiest times in my career", particularly highlighting his first season.

=== Further spells in non-League ===
Holroyd signed for newly promoted National League club Chorley on 27 June 2019. He scored his first goal for the club in a 2–2 away draw with Sutton United on 10 August 2019, and went on to score nine times in 30 appearances in all competitions. In February 2020, he joined Stalybridge Celtic of the National League North, on a contract until the end of the 2020–21 season. The season was curtailed the following month due to the COVID-19 pandemic, and Holroyd departed the club on 10 September 2020, having made three appearances.

Holroyd subsequently signed for Warrington Town on 5 October 2020, reuniting with manager Paul Carden and assistant manager Mark Beesley, both former teammates at Cambridge United. He made two substitute appearances before leaving exactly one month later, marking the final club of his playing career.

== Style of play ==
Holroyd began his career as a striker and regarded it as his primary position throughout his playing career. During his time at Preston North End, he was predominantly deployed as a right winger, a role he continued in from his second season at Macclesfield Town. He described the position as more demanding due to the increased defensive responsibilities. Possessing notable pace and skill, Holroyd's versatility enabled him to play effectively in both roles. He attributed his assist contributions to his background as a striker, stating that it gave him an understanding of attacking movement and where forwards preferred to receive the ball.

== Personal life ==
Following his retirement from professional football, Holroyd began a career in finance.

== Career statistics ==
Appearances and goals by club, season and competition
Club	Season	League			FA Cup		League Cup		Other		Total	
Club	Season	Division	Apps	Goals	Apps	Goals	Apps	Goals	Apps	Goals	Apps	Goals
Chester City	2006–07	League Two	22	0	1	0	1	0	1 (Note: Appearance(s) in Football League Trophy)	0	25	0
Chester City	2007–08	League Two	24	4	0	0	1	0	1	1	26	5
Chester City	Total		46	4	1	0	2	0	2	1	51	5
Cambridge United	2008–09	Conference Premier	35	10	2	0	—		6 (Note: Two appearances in FA Trophy; one appearance in Conference League Cup; three appearances in 2009 Conference Premier play-offs)	0	43	10
Cambridge United	2009–10	Conference Premier	24	12	3	1	—		3 (Note: Appearance(s) in FA Trophy)	2	30	15
Cambridge United	Total		59	22	5	1	0	0	9	2	73	25
Brighton & Hove Albion	2009–10	League One	13	0	—		—		—		13	0
Brighton & Hove Albion	2010–11	League One	3	0	1	0	1	0	0	0	5	0
Brighton & Hove Albion	Total		16	0	1	0	1	0	0	0	18	0
Stevenage (loan)	2010–11	League Two	12	6	0	0	—		—		12	6
Bury (loan)	2010–11	League Two	4	1	—		—		—		4	1
Rotherham United	2011–12	League Two	15	1	2	0	1	0	1	0	19	1
Preston North End	2011–12	League One	20	1	—		—		—		20	1
Preston North End	2012–13	League One	0	0	—		0	0	—		0	0
Preston North End	Total		20	1	0	0	0	0	0	0	20	1
Macclesfield Town (loan)	2012–13	Conference Premier	19	7	3	2	—		1	0	23	9
Morecambe	2012–13	League Two	16	1	—		—		—		16	1
Macclesfield Town	2013–14	Conference Premier	39	7	2	0	—		1	0	42	7
Macclesfield Town	2014–15	Conference Premier	37	4	2	0	—		1	0	40	4
Macclesfield Town	2015–16	National League	42	1	1	0	—		4	0	47	1
Macclesfield Town	2016–17	National League	42	13	3	1	—		7	0	52	14
Macclesfield Town	Total		160	25	8	1	0	0	13	0	181	26
Wrexham	2017–18	National League	34	13	1	0	—		0	0	35	13
Wrexham	2018–19	National League	26	3	2	0	—		2 (Note: One appearance and one goal in FA Trophy; one appearance in 2019 National League play-offs)	1	30	4
Wrexham	Total		60	16	3	0	0	0	2	1	65	17
Chorley	2019–20	National League	27	6	1	1	—		2	2	30	9
Stalybridge Celtic	2020–21	National League North	3	0	—		—		0	0	3	0
Warrington Town	2020–21	Northern Premier League Premier Division	2	0	—		—		0	0	2	0
Career total			459	90	24	5	4	0	30	6	517	101

== Honours ==
Macclesfield Town

- FA Trophy runner-up: 2016–17
