= Edwin Holroyd =

English cricketer

Personal information
- Born: 27 October 1855; Halifax, Yorkshire, England
- Died: 9 April 1914 (aged 58); Rochdale, Lancashire, England
- Batting: Right-handed
- Bowling: Right-arm medium pace

Domestic team information
- Years: Team
- 1878: Lancashire

Career statistics
Competition	First-class
Matches	1
Runs scored	6
Batting average	3.00
100s/50s	0/0
Top score	4
Catches/stumpings	1/0
- Source: ESPNcricinfo, 3 December 2025

Edwin Holroyd (27 October 1855 – 9 April 1914) was an English cricketer. He played in a single major cricket match for Lancashire in 1878. He also had a 12-year career representing the Rochdale Cricket Club, where he was a skilled batter.

== Early life and sole first-class match ==
Holroyd was born in Halifax, Yorkshire. He was the son of a dyer who had a business in Meanwood.

He joined Rochdale Cricket Club in 1875, beginning an association with the club that lasted over a decade. While with Rochdale, he was called into the Lancashire County Cricket Club squad for a first-class match that started on 30 May 1878 against Nottinghamshire. One of two debutants used by Lancashire in the match, the other being James Dixon, Holroyd was dismissed for two runs in the first innings and four runs in the second, both times by Alfred Shaw. As a fielder in the first innings, he secured a single catch, that of Wilfred Flowers. Holroyd did not appear in any further first-class matches in his career.

== Later career and later life ==
With Rochdale, he played matches against touring Australian teams in 1878 and 1880. During the former tour, Holroyd clean bowled Australian captain Dave Gregory and had Rochdale's highest score in their first innings. He also appeared in matches against both the United North of England Eleven and the United South of England Eleven touring clubs. In local matches, he had the second-best batting average in 1882 and the best average during 1884. He retired from Rochdale after the 1886 season.

A bookkeeper in his later years, Holroyd died on 9 April 1914.
