= Phil Bolland =

English footballer

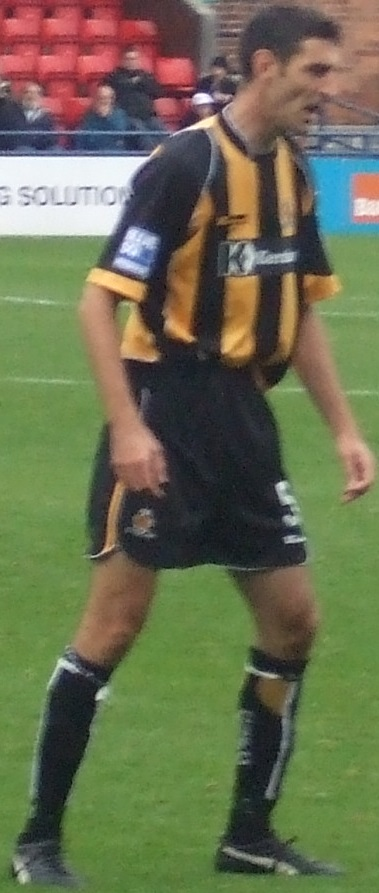

Personal information
- Full name: Philip Christopher Bolland
- Date of birth: 26 August 1976 (age 50)
- Place of birth: Liverpool, England
- Height: 6 ft 4 in (1.93 m)
- Position: Centre-back

Senior career*
Years	Team	Apps	(Gls)
1995–1996	Altrincham		
1996	Salford City		
1996	Trafford		
1996–1997	Knowsley United		
1997–2001	Southport	96	(9)
2001–2002	Oxford United	20	(1)
2002–2006	Chester City	139	(7)
2006	Peterborough United	17	(0)
2006–2008	Chester City	28	(1)
2008	Wrexham	18	(0)
2008–2009	Cambridge United	38	(0)
2009–2012	Barrow	101	(4)
2012	Droylsden	2	(0)
2012–2013	FC Halifax Town	7	(0)
2013–2014	Airbus UK Broughton	15	(3)
Total		481	(25)
- * Club domestic league appearances and goals

Philip Christopher Bolland (born 26 August 1976) is an English former footballer, who played as a centre back. He currently works as a physiotherapist for Liverpool.

== Career ==
Bolland enjoyed two spells at Chester City, having signed from Peterborough United in the summer of 2006 – just a few months after he'd moved in the opposite direction. Mark Wright has managed him at the four clubs he has been in charge of, namely Southport, Oxford, Chester and Peterborough. Bolland had earlier played in non-league football for clubs including Altrincham, Salford City, Trafford and Knowsley United.

Bolland struggled to stake a place in the first-team side at Chester under new manager Bobby Williamson in 2007–08, making just three appearances. He spent time on trial with Wrexham and it was announced in December 2007 he was no longer part of Chester's plans.

On 8 January 2008 it was announced Bolland had been released by Chester and he quickly agreed terms with Wrexham. He was released by Wrexham in May 2008 following the club's relegation to the Football Conference and signed for Cambridge United on 31 July 2008 where he would be reunited with former teammates Gary Brabin and Paul Carden, manager and assistant manager of the Conference side. He spent one season at Cambridge, before signing for Barrow AFC, also of the Conference National.

Bolland won the FA Trophy with Barrow in the 2009–10 season. In May 2011 he was offered a new contract by Barrow and became the club captain. He had a full further season at Barrow, but was released at the end of the 2011–12 season, having played over 100 league matches for the club. He then joined Droylsden.

In January 2013, it was announced that Bolland had joined Airbus UK. After helping Airbus qualify for the Europa League in his final two seasons, Bolland announced he was retiring from playing to concentrate on his physiotherapy career with Liverpool.

== Physiotherapy career ==
In 1997, Bolland graduated from the University of Manchester with a degree in physiotherapy. He began working with Liverpool in 2012 as an academy physiotherapist whilst playing semi-professionally. Bolland retired from playing 2014 and began working as full-time with Liverpool as the club's U18 Lead Physiotherapist.

== Honours ==
Chester City

- Football Conference champions: 2003–04

Southport

- FA Trophy runners-up: 1997–98

Barrow AFC

- FA Trophy winners: 2009–10
