= James Dixon (Lancashire cricketer) =

English cricketer

Personal information
- Full name: unknown

Domestic team information
- Years: Team
- 1878: Lancashire

Career statistics
Competition	FC
Matches	1
Runs scored	2
Batting average	1.00
100s/50s	–/–
Top score	2
Balls bowled	–
Wickets	–
Bowling average	–
5 wickets in innings	–
10 wickets in match	–
Best bowling	–
Catches/stumpings	–/–
- Source: CricketArchive, 8 December 2010

James Dixon (dates of birth and death unknown) was an English first-class cricketer, active 1878, who played for Lancashire in one match against Nottinghamshire at Trent Bridge. He scored 2 runs in Lancashire's first innings before being dismissed by Fred Morley. In the second innings, Dixon was dismissed by Alfred Shaw for a duck.
