= Mark Beesley =

English footballer

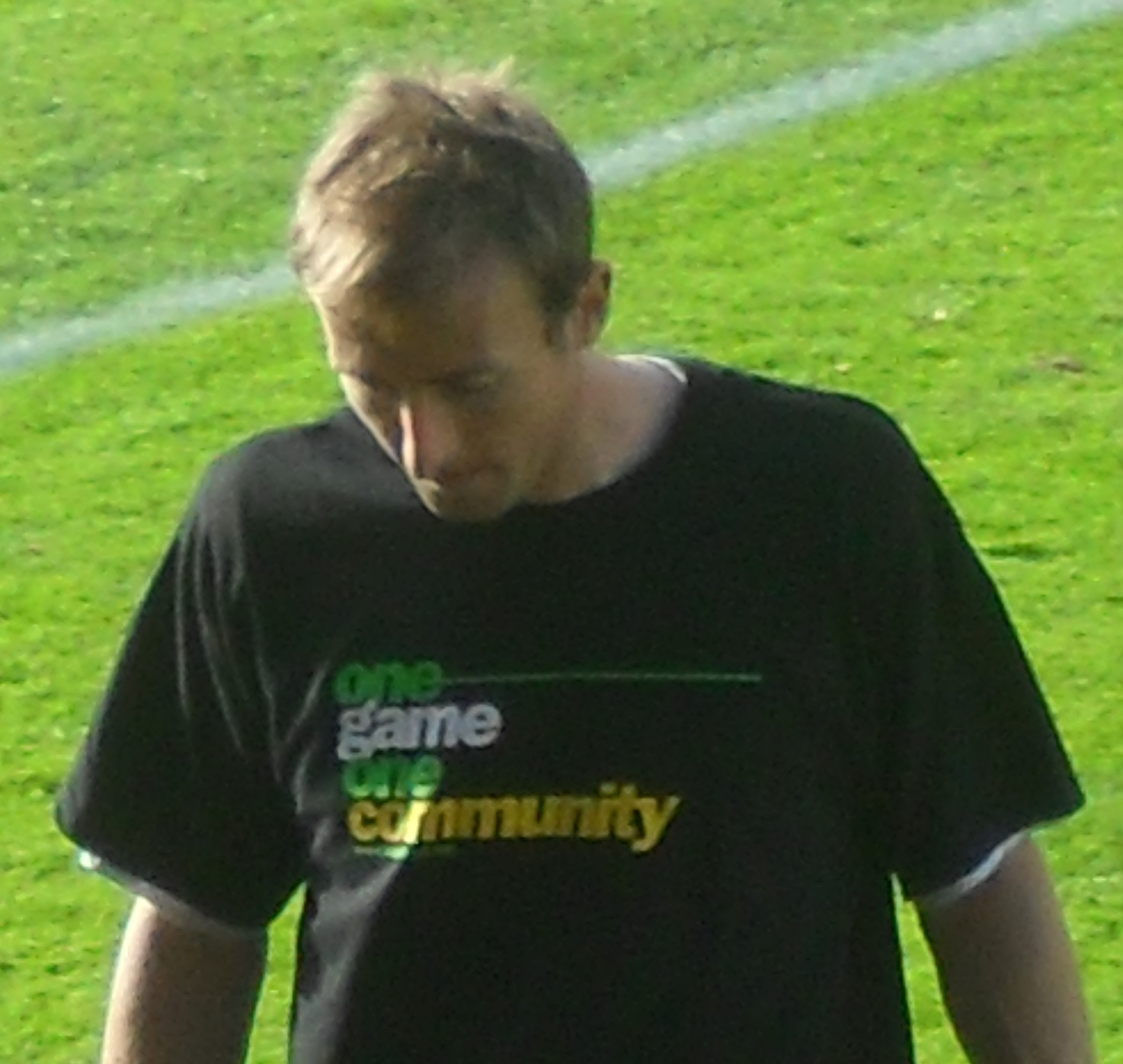
- Beesley training with York City in 2010

Personal information
- Full name: Mark Anthony Beesley
- Date of birth: 5 December 1980 (age 45)
- Place of birth: Burscough, England
- Height: 5 ft 10 in (1.78 m)
- Position: Striker

Team information
- Current team: F.C. United of Manchester (manager)

Youth career
- 1997–1999: Preston North End

Senior career*
Years	Team	Apps	(Gls)
1999–2000	Preston North End	1	(0)
2000–2003	Chester City	97	(34)
2003	→ Southport (loan)	5	(1)
2003–2004	Hereford United	12	(2)
2004–2008	Forest Green Rovers	102	(25)
2006	→ Lancaster City (loan)	5	(4)
2008–2010	Cambridge United	62	(13)
2009	→ Chester City (loan)	0	(0)
2010	→ AFC Telford United (loan)	6	(1)
2010–2011	Fleetwood Town	5	(0)
2010	→ York City (loan)	3	(0)
2010–2011	→ Altrincham (loan)	3	(0)
2011	Altrincham	15	(2)
2011–2012	Burscough		
2012	Hednesford Town		
2012–2013	Nantwich Town		
2012–2013	→ Warrington Town (loan)		
2013	Skelmersdale United		
2013	Burscough Richmond		

Managerial career
- 2021–2024: Warrington Town
- 2024–: F.C. United of Manchester
- * Club domestic league appearances and goals as of 00:30, 23 September 2024 (UTC)

Mark Anthony Beesley (born 5 December 1980) is an English former footballer who played as a striker. He is the manager of F.C. United of Manchester.

== Career ==
Born in Burscough, Lancashire, Beesley began his career at the youth system of Preston North End before signing a professional contract on 26 June 1999. He subsequently spent three and a half seasons at Chester City. Beesley scored 16 times in the 2001–02 season to help Chester avoid relegation from the Football Conference, but by the start of the 2003–04 he was out of favour with manager Mark Wright. After a spell out on loan at Southport, Beesley was allowed to join Chester's title rivals Hereford United in December 2003.

Beesley made 15 appearances for the club, scoring in Hereford's record-equalling 9–0 win over Dagenham & Redbridge, and against his former club in the 2–1 win over Chester. However, by this point Chester had sealed the Football Conference title at Hereford's expense and Beesley was to lose out in the play-offs to Aldershot Town.

He joined Forest Green Rovers on 8 June 2004 where he was initially unlucky with injuries, missing nearly an entire season with a knee injury. In August 2006 he returned to the north-west for a loan spell with Lancaster City, before returning to Forest Green, where he struck up a strong partnership with the prolific Stuart Fleetwood.

He signed for Cambridge United in January 2008 for a five-figure fee but never really enjoyed the form he had in his later stages at Forest Green. He was loaned to Chester City and AFC Telford United before being released by Cambridge manager Martin Ling at the end of the 2009–10 season.

He signed for newly promoted Conference Premier side Fleetwood Town on 29 July 2010. He joined fellow Conference Premier team York City on a one-month loan on 5 October and he made his debut later that day in a 1–0 defeat to Kettering Town. Beesley returned to Fleetwood early on 1 November after York manager Gary Mills decided to cut his loan short. He then joined Altrincham on loan until 3 January 2011 on 26 November and he made his debut a day later in a 4–0 defeat at Cambridge. After his loan spell expired, he signed permanently for Altrincham but was released at the end of the season.

In July 2011, Beesley signed for Northern Premier League Premier Division side Burscough, in his home town. He moved to promotion challenging Hednesford Town on 6 January 2012. He ended the 2011–12 season with Hednesford but left the club at the end of the season.

In June 2012, Beesley signed for Northern Premier League Premier Division outfit Nantwich Town. He left Nantwich on loan in October 2012 however and joined Warrington Town of the Northern Premier League Division One North and made his club debut on 30 October in a match against Ramsbottom United. In his next match, he scored his first goal for the club, as they beat Harrogate Railway Athletic 4–0 at home.

In February 2013, Beesley was released by Nantwich and later that month signed for Northern Premier League Division One North side Skelmersdale United. He left a few weeks later to join West Lancashire Football League Division One club Burscough Richmond in late February 2013.

== Coaching ==
Beesley was managing Burscough in 2016, but left in June of that year. He later joined Warrington Town as assistant manager to Paul Carden whilst also coaching at an academy run by Robbie Fowler. Beesley was appointed manager in December 2021, after Carden left to manage another club. In September 2024, Beesley announced his resignation following a poor start to the season.

On 21 September 2024, Beesley was appointed manager of Northern Premier League Premier Division side F.C. United of Manchester.

== Career statistics ==
As of match played 30 April 2011

Club statistics
Club	Season	League			FA Cup		League Cup		Other		Total	
Club	Season	Division	Apps	Goals	Apps	Goals	Apps	Goals	Apps	Goals	Apps	Goals
Preston North End	1999–2000	Second Division	1	0	0	0	0	0	1 (Note: Appearance in Associate Members' Cup)	0	2	0
Chester City	2000–01	Football Conference	40	12	5	1	—		7 (Note: Three appearances and three goals in Conference League Cup, three appearances in FA Trophy, one appearance in Football League Trophy)	3	52	16
Chester City	2001–02	Football Conference	35	16	0	0	—		2 (Note: One appearance and one goal in Conference Shield, one appearance in FA Trophy)	1	37	17
Chester City	2002–03	Football Conference	19	6	0	0	—		1 (Note: Appearance in Football League Trophy)	0	20	6
Chester City	2003–04	Football Conference	3	0	0	0	—		1	0	4	0
Chester City	Total		97	34	5	1	—		11	4	113	39
Southport (loan)	2003–04	NPL Premier Division	5	1	0	0	—		0	0	5	1
Hereford United	2003–04	Football Conference	12	2	0	0	—		3 (Note: One appearance in FA Trophy, one in Football Conference play-offs)	0	15	2
Forest Green Rovers	2004–05	Conference National	32	9	2	2	—		1 (Note: Appearance(s) in FA Trophy)	0	35	9
Forest Green Rovers	2005–06	Conference National	16	0	0	0	—		1	0	17	0
Forest Green Rovers	2006–07	Conference National	31	5	0	0	—		1	0	32	5
Forest Green Rovers	2007–08	Conference Premier	23	11	5	2	—		2	0	30	13
Forest Green Rovers	Total		102	25	7	4	—		5	0	114	29
Lancaster City (loan)	2006–07	Conference North	5	4	0	0	—		0	0	5	4
Cambridge United	2007–08	Conference Premier	17	7	0	0	—		1 (Note: Appearance in Conference Premier play-offs)	0	18	7
Cambridge United	2008–09	Conference Premier	28	4	2	0	—		1	0	31	4
Cambridge United	2009–10	Conference Premier	17	2	0	0	—		3	0	20	2
Cambridge United	Total		62	13	2	0	—		5	0	69	13
AFC Telford United (loan)	2009–10	Conference North	6	1	0	0	—		0	0	6	1
Fleetwood Town	2010–11	Conference Premier	5	0	0	0	—		0	0	5	0
York City (loan)	2010–11	Conference Premier	3	0	0	0	—		0	0	3	0
Altrincham (loan)	2010–11	Conference Premier	3	0	0	0	—		1	0	4	0
Altrincham	2010–11	Conference Premier	15	2	0	0	—		1	0	16	2
Career total			316	82	14	5	0	0	27	4	357	90

== Managerial statistics ==
As of match played 9 September 2023

Managerial record by team and tenure
Team	Nat	From	To	Record					Ref.
Team	Nat	From	To	G	W	D	L	Win %	Ref.
Warrington Town	(England)	23 November 2021	21 September 2024	88	40	25	23	45.45	
Career Total				88	40	25	23	45.45	—
