= Courtney Pitt =

English footballer (born 1981)

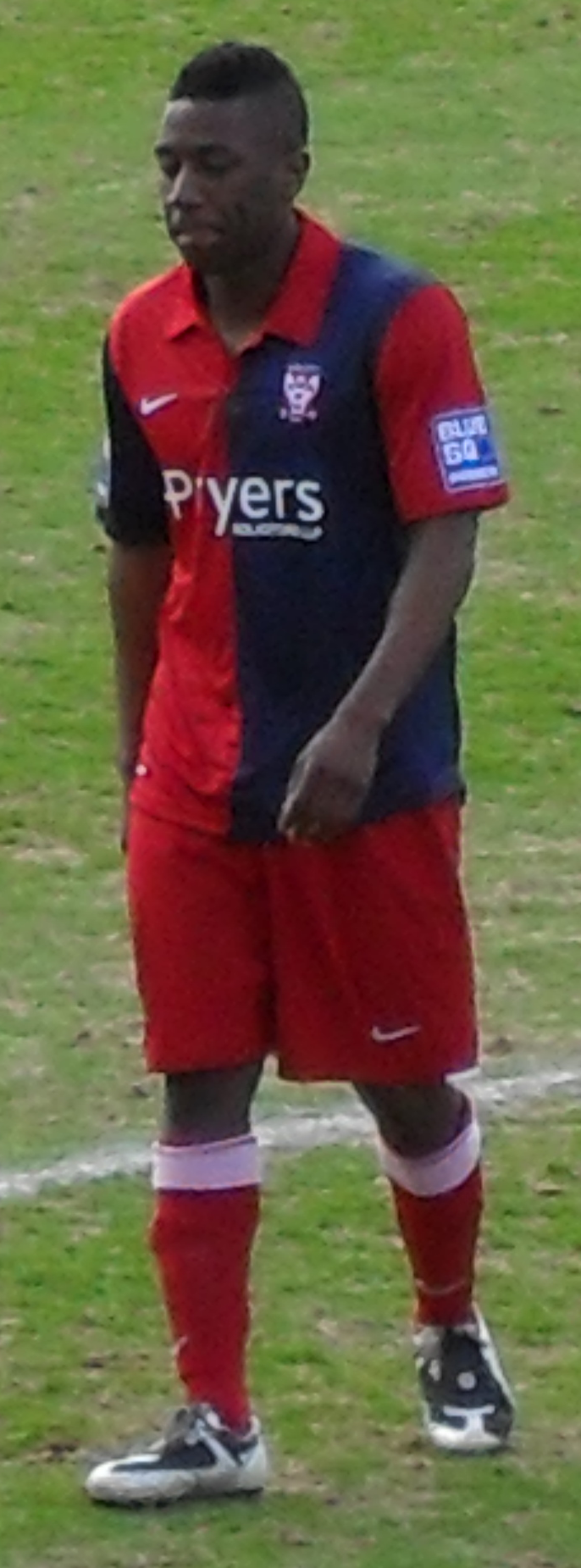
- Pitt playing for York City in 2010

Personal information
- Full name: Courtney Leon Pitt
- Date of birth: 17 December 1981 (age 44)
- Place of birth: Paddington, England
- Height: 5 ft 7 in (1.70 m)
- Position: Midfielder

Youth career
- ?–2001: Chelsea

Senior career*
Years	Team	Apps	(Gls)
2001–2004	Portsmouth	39	(3)
2003	→ Luton Town (loan)	12	(0)
2003–2004	→ Coventry City (loan)	1	(0)
2004	Oxford United	8	(0)
2004–2005	Boston United	32	(4)
2005–2010	Cambridge United	154	(15)
2010	→ York City (loan)	11	(1)
2010	Weymouth	3	(0)
2010–2012	AFC Telford United	4	(0)
2011–2012	Chasetown	14	(1)
2012	Stafford Rangers	?	(?)
Total		278	(24)
- * Club domestic league appearances and goals

Courtney Leon Pitt (born 17 December 1981) is an English retired footballer who played as a midfielder.

He previously played for Portsmouth, Luton Town, Coventry City, Oxford United, Boston United, Cambridge United, York City, Weymouth and AFC Telford United.

== Career ==
Pitt began his career with Premier League club Chelsea, progressing through the youth ranks at Stamford Bridge. Pitt joined First Division side Portsmouth on a three-year contract on 16 June 2001 when his former Chelsea coach Graham Rix took over as manager at Fratton Park, turning down the offer of a new three-year contract at Chelsea. Pitt made the switch for a tribunal set fee of £200,000 plus add-ons, and he finished his first season with the club, 2001–02, with 41 appearances and three goals.

He made his debut for Pompey on the opening day of the season, in a 2–2 draw at Wolverhampton Wanderers and he went on to become a regular member of Portsmouth's squad, making a total of 39 League appearances during the course of the season (10 of those appearances coming as a substitute). He scored three goals during the campaign, all towards the end of the season, in a 3–0 home win over Millwall, a 1–1 draw at Birmingham City and a 3–1 loss at Manchester City.

However, Rix left the club, and Harry Redknapp took over as boss of Pompey. He then brought in a number of new players, including Luton's home grown starlet Matthew Taylor, and this pushed Pitt out of the first-team squad. He failed to make an appearance during the entire 2002–03 season under Redknapp as Portsmouth gained promotion to the Premier League as Division One champions. He came to Luton Town for a trial towards the end of the season, and he was snapped up on loan just two days after Mick Harford returned to Kenilworth Road as director of football and first-team coach – he had seemingly impressed Harford during his trial and was recommended to Mike Newell.

Pitt made his debut for Luton Town on the opening day of the 2003–04 season in a 3–1 home victory over Rushden & Diamonds and he went on to feature in a further five matches for the Hatters, netting his first – and only – goal for the club with a free-kick in a 4–1 home win over Yeovil Town in the League Cup first round.

He helped the side to a 2–1 win at Stockport County and a 3–2 home win over Hartlepool United, but, unfortunately, he sustained an Achilles tendon injury and it meant he would be forced to miss two weeks of action. Manager Mike Newell therefore decided it would be silly to extend his loan spell, and he returned to his club, Portsmouth.

However, on his return to Fratton Park, Pitt worked extremely hard to regain his fitness and he recovered from the Achilles tendon injury in a matter of a fortnight and satisfied that he was now fit to resume action, manager Mike Newell re-signed Pitt on loan for a second month. His second loan spell with the club wasn't quite as successful as his first – although he did help the Hatters to a couple of home wins.

He featured as a substitute in a 1–1 home draw with Queens Park Rangers and in a 4–4 draw after extra-time at Premiership Charlton Athletic in the League Cup second round that only saw the Hatters lose in a penalty shootout.

Returning to the starting line-up in the following match, a 3–0 loss at Oldham Athletic, Pitt remained in the team for the next five matches on the left-hand side of midfield as the side continued their good home form with 3–1 victories over both Tranmere Rovers and Wycombe Wanderers, but also saw their away form cost them with a 2–2 draw at Swindon Town and losses at Brentford (4–2) and AFC Bournemouth (6–3).

In late October, following the heavy loss at Bournemouth, manager Mike Newell decided to allow Pitt to return to Portsmouth. With the club under a transfer embargo, Newell could not sign any new players unless he allowed one of his two loan players – Pitt or Gary McSheffrey – to return to their respective clubs. Wanting to sign an experienced goalkeeper, Newell took the decision to allow Pitt to return to Portsmouth with his thanks for his efforts during his time at Kenilworth Road. Pitt then enjoyed a brief loan spell with Coventry City.

He linked up with his former manager Rix for a third time at Oxford United for an undisclosed fee on 25 March 2004. However, Pitt failed to make an impact at the Kassam Stadium, and after eight appearances for the U's, he was released at the end of the 2003–04 season and began the search for a new club. After a spell with Boston United, he signed for Conference National side Cambridge United prior to the start of the 2005–06 season.

In May 2008, Pitt was one of five players released by manager Jimmy Quinn following the 2008 Conference National play-off final loss to Exeter City but was brought back to the club by Gary Brabin, Quinn's successor, on 8 July 2008. He joined Conference Premier club York City on loan until the end of the 2009–10 season on 22 January 2010. He made his debut as a 75th-minute substitute in a 1–0 defeat at Ebbsfleet United on 13 February, nearly scoring an equaliser for York but was denied by goalkeeper Lance Cronin. He scored his first goal with the winner in a 1–0 victory over Mansfield Town on 16 March. He was to be released by Cambridge following the expiration of his contract on 30 June. He came on as a substitute on 73 minutes in the 2010 Conference National play-off final at Wembley Stadium on 16 May, which was lost 3–1 to Oxford. He finished the season with 12 appearances and one goal for York.

Pitt turned out as a triallist for Wrexham in their 3–2 friendly win at AFC Sudbury on 20 July 2010. On 17 September he joined Southern Football League Premier Division side Weymouth on non-contract terms, before being released by the club on 7 October. On 19 November Pitt joined Conference North side AFC Telford United on non-contract terms after a successful trial with the club. He finished the season having made four appearances for Telford and was invited back to the club for a pre-season trial, ahead of their first Conference season. He stayed with the club until January 2012 when he left by mutual consent. On 25 February, Courtney made his debut for Chasetown against Stocksbridge Park Steels in the Northern Premier League Premier Division.

He joined Stafford Rangers in July 2012 ahead of the 2012–13 season. On 25 October Pitt left Stafford Rangers by mutual consent.

== Style of play ==
Former York City FC Manager Martin Foyle described Pitt as a player who "can take people on, is great at set-pieces and can provide an outlet on that left side".

== Personal life ==
In 2021 he graduated from Staffordshire University with a first-class degree in Physical Education and Youth Sport Coaching.

== Career statistics ==
Appearances and goals by club, season and competition
Club	Season	League^{[A]}		FA Cup		League Cup		Other^{[B]}		Total	
Club	Season	Apps	Goals	Apps	Goals	Apps	Goals	Apps	Goals	Apps	Goals
Portsmouth	2001–02	39	3	1	0	1	0	0	0	41	3
Portsmouth	2002–03	0	0	0	0	0	0	0	0	0	0
Portsmouth	2003–04	0	0	0	0	0	0	0	0	0	0
Portsmouth	Total	39	3	1	0	1	0	0	0	41	3
Luton Town (loan)	2003–04	12	0	0	0	2	1	0	0	14	1
Coventry City (loan)	2003–04	1	0	1	0	0	0	0	0	2	0
Oxford United	2003–04	8	0	0	0	0	0	0	0	8	0
Boston United	2004–05	32	4	0	0	2	1	0	0	34	5
Cambridge United	2005–06	30	5	0	0	0	0	0	0	30	5
Cambridge United	2006–07	42	3	0	0	0	0	0	0	42	3
Cambridge United	2007–08	46	3	3	0	0	0	4	0	53	3
Cambridge United	2008–09	20	2	0	0	0	0	2	0	22	2
Cambridge United	2009–10	16	2	2	1	0	0	0	0	18	3
Cambridge United	Total	154	15	5	1	0	0	6	0	165	16
York City (loan)	2009–10	11	1	0	0	0	0	1	0	12	1
Weymouth	2010–11	?	?	?	?	0	0	?	?	?	?
AFC Telford United	2010–11	4	0	3	2	0	0	0	0	4	0
Career totals		261	23	7	1	5	2	7	0	280	26

== Footnotes ==
A. The "League" column constitutes appearances and goals (including those as a substitute) in the Football League and Football Conference.
B. The "Other" column constitutes appearances and goals (including those as a substitute) in the FA Trophy and play-offs.
