= Lee Phillips (footballer, born 1980) =

English footballer

Personal information
- Full name: Lee Paul Phillips
- Date of birth: 16 September 1980 (age 46)
- Place of birth: Penzance, England
- Position: Striker

Senior career*
Years	Team	Apps	(Gls)
1996–2001	Plymouth Argyle	50	(1)
2001–2004	Weymouth	135	(50)
2002	→ Newport County (loan)	6	(4)
2004–2007	Exeter City	87	(21)
2007–2008	Torquay United	41	(12)
2008–2009	Rushden & Diamonds	20	(2)
2009	Weymouth	5	(1)
2009–2010	Cambridge United	37	(3)
2010–2012	Bath City	74	(18)
2012	→ Eastleigh (loan)	7	(0)
2012–2016	Chippenham Town	100	(28)
2016–2017	Exmouth Town		
2017–2018	Saltash United		
- * Club domestic league appearances and goals

Lee Paul Phillips (born 16 September 1980) is an English former professional footballer

== Career ==
A striker, Phillips, began his football career as a youth trainee with Plymouth Argyle, turning professional in the 1996 close season. He made his league debut, as a late substitute for Neil Illman, in Argyle's 2–0 win at home to Gillingham on 29 October 1996 and made one further appearance that season. He went on to make over 50 first team appearances for Plymouth, although over half of them were as a substitute. Although scoring just the one league goal whilst at Plymouth, it came in an extremely memorable and dramatic game. With Plymouth playing at Carlisle on the last day of the 1998/99 season, Carlisle needed to win to avoid relegation from the Football League. Phillips put Plymouth 1–0 up but Carlisle equalised and then subsequently scored the winning goal in injury time courtesy of their goalkeeper, Jimmy Glass. While at Plymouth, Phillips suffered a broken leg that many thought would end his playing career.

He recovered and resumed his career, but failed to win a regular starting place and joined Conference South side, Weymouth in January 2001, initially on loan, but on a free transfer two months later. In February 2002, Phillips joined Newport County on loan until the end of the season as Weymouth tried to cut their wage bill. Over two seasons, Phillips made 67 appearances for Weymouth, scoring 33 goals, attracting attention from a number of higher level sides, including Reading and Yeovil Town (who he had a trial with in November 2002).

On 22 February 2005, Phillips moved to Conference National side Exeter City along with teammate Steve Tully for an undisclosed fee.

Phillips joined local rivals Torquay United for a fee of £17,500 on a three-year deal on 21 June 2007 and quickly forged a successful partnership with Tim Sills.

On 15 May 2008 he joined fellow Conference team Rushden & Diamonds for an undisclosed fee.

In the January 2009 transfer window, Phillips left Rushden and rejoined Weymouth. He joined Cambridge United on 2 March.

He left Cambridge at the end of the 2009–10 season to sign for Bath City on 14 July. He departed the club two years later after their relegation to the Conference South.

On 25 June 2012 Phillips joined Chippenham Town now works at BD Plymouth as an OTL Now played for Plymouth True Blues in S.Devon division 1 with 8 goals in his first 5 games
