= John Holroyd (cricketer) =

English cricketer

John Holroyd (15 April 1907 – 15 September 1975) was an English cricketer active from 1925 to 1935 who played for Lancashire. He was born in Oldham and died in St Bees, Cumberland. He appeared in eleven first-class matches as a lefthanded batsman who bowled slow left arm orthodox. He scored 33 runs with a highest score of 18* and held two catches. He took 23 wickets with a best analysis of five for 47.
