= Dan Gleeson =

English footballer

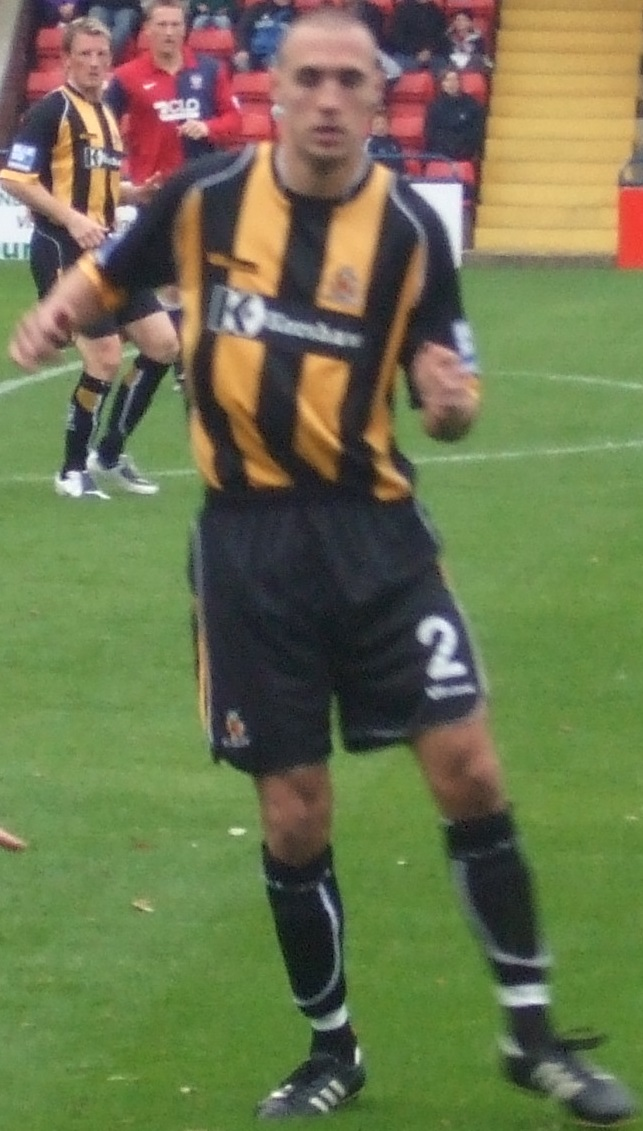
- Gleeson playing for Cambridge United in 2008

Personal information
- Full name: Daniel Edwin Gleeson
- Date of birth: 17 February 1985 (age 41)
- Place of birth: Cambridge, England
- Height: 6 ft 3 in (1.91 m)
- Position: Defender

Team information
- Current team: Godmanchester Rovers (manager)

Senior career*
Years	Team	Apps	(Gls)
2002–2006	Cambridge United	61	(1)
2003	→ Welling United (loan)	2	(0)
2006–2007	Notts County	17	(0)
2007	→ Cambridge United (loan)	8	(1)
2007–2010	Cambridge United	107	(1)
2010–2012	Luton Town	44	(0)
2012–2015	Lowestoft Town		
2015–2016	Cambridge City		
2016–2017	St Neots Town		
2017–2018	Histon		

International career
2007–2008	England C	7	(0)

Managerial career
- 2016: Cambridge City (player-manager)
- 2016–2017: St Neots Town (player-manager)
- 2023–: Godmanchester Rovers
- * Club domestic league appearances and goals

Daniel Edwin Gleeson (born 17 February 1985) is an English former professional footballer who played as a right back.

== Career ==
Born in Cambridge, Cambridgeshire, Gleeson joined Cambridge United as a trainee in 2001 and his debut on 1 November 2003, in Division Three against Kidderminster Harriers. He made a total of 51 Football League and Conference appearances for Cambridge before signing for Notts County in July 2006. He rejoined Cambridge on loan in March 2007, where he has been an established player for the Conference National side. The deal was made permanent in the summer.

Gleeson scored his first senior goal in the 7–0 win against Weymouth in March 2007.

Following a great start to the 2007–08 season, he was rewarded by his first England National Game XI (England 'C') cap in November and signed a new deal to 2010.

On 19 May 2010 Gleeson joined Cambridge's Conference rivals Luton Town on a free transfer, signing a two-year contract. He was a regular in the side during the 2010–11 season, also playing in Luton's play-off final defeat to AFC Wimbledon. Gleeson played far fewer games the next season due to a combination of injury and being kept out of the team by Curtis Osano. On 30 May 2012, Luton manager Paul Buckle did not offer Gleeson a new contract, and he subsequently left the club.

On 2 July 2012, Gleeson signed for Lowestoft Town.

== Personal life ==
He was born just minutes from the Abbey and watched Cambridge United with his family before joining the club as a scholar.
