= Danny Brown (footballer) =

English footballer

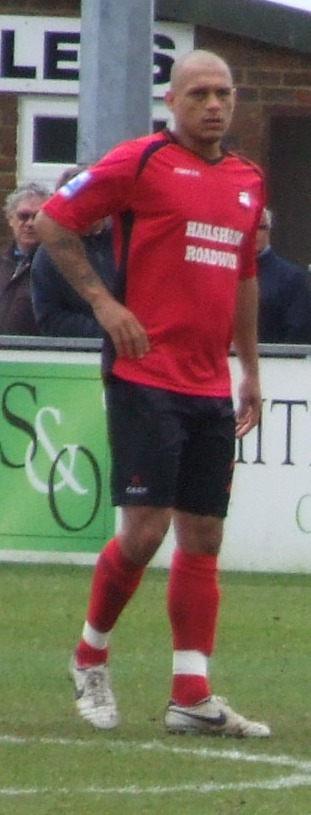
- Brown playing for Eastbourne Borough

Personal information
- Date of birth: 12 September 1980 (age 46)
- Place of birth: Bethnal Green, London, England
- Position: Midfielder

Team information
- Current team: Billericay Town (Manager)

Youth career
- Watford

Senior career*
Years	Team	Apps	(Gls)
1998–1999	Leyton Orient	7	(0)
1999–2003	Barnet	93	(8)
2003–2005	Oxford United	16	(0)
2005–2006	Crawley Town	37	(1)
2006–2009	Cambridge United	47	(2)
2008	→ Eastbourne Borough (loan)	5	(0)
2009–2011	Eastbourne Borough	60	(1)
2010	→ Harlow Town (loan)		
2011–2013	Harlow Town	16	(1)

Managerial career
- 2022–: Billericay Town
- * Club domestic league appearances and goals

Daniel Brown (born 12 September 1980) is an English former footballer who manages Billericay Town.

== Career ==
In November 2008, Brown transferred to Conference National side Eastbourne Borough on a loan lasting until 1 January. In January, after much interest by other big clubs, Brown signed a contract at Eastbourne Borough lasting until the end of the season. In the absence of Captain Paul Armstrong, he was made the club captain. In April 2009, Brown was enjoying his time at Eastbourne stating he made the right choice and was in talks to extend his part-time contract for another year. In May 2009, it was confirmed that Brown had signed a two-year deal at Priory Lane. Brown departed Priory Lane in January 2011 to join Harlow Town after a loan spell there.

== Coaching career ==
Danny Brown retired from playing in 2015 and went into coaching, acting as interim manager at Billericay Town F.C. after the departure of manager Kevin Watson. Brown was again appointed as Interim Manager of Billericay Town on 19 April with the club sitting bottom of the league, one point from safety, with just four matches remaining. Brown was unable to save the club from relegation, a 2–1 defeat in the penultimate game of the season seeing the club relegated to the Isthmian League.
