= Paul Carden =

English footballer

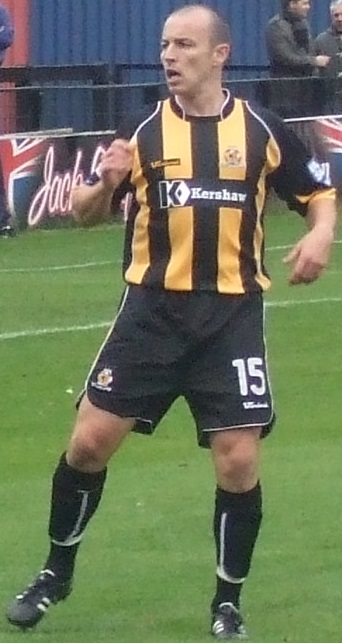
- Carden playing for Cambridge United in 2008

Personal information
- Full name: Paul Andrew Carden
- Date of birth: 29 March 1979 (age 47)
- Place of birth: Liverpool, England
- Position: Midfielder

Team information
- Current team: Warrington Town (manager)

Senior career*
Years	Team	Apps	(Gls)
1996–1998	Blackpool	1	(0)
1998–2000	Rochdale	46	(0)
2000	→ Chester City (loan)	11	(0)
2000–2001	Chester City	35	(0)
2001	Doncaster Rovers	16	(1)
2001–2005	Chester City	120	(3)
2005–2006	Peterborough United	44	(0)
2006	Burscough	0	(0)
2006–2007	Burton Albion	27	(1)
2007–2008	Accrington Stanley	4	(0)
2007	→ Cambridge United (loan)	2	(0)
2008	→ Cambridge United (loan)	17	(0)
2008	Wrexham	0	(0)
2008–2011	Cambridge United	102	(3)
2011	→ Luton Town (loan)	10	(0)
2011–2012	Luton Town	1	(0)
Total		436	(8)

Managerial career
- 2009: Cambridge United (caretaker)
- 2009: Cambridge United (caretaker)
- 2015: Southport
- 2016: Tranmere Rovers (caretaker)
- 2016–2021: Warrington Town
- 2021–2022: AFC Telford United
- 2023–2024: Nantwich Town
- 2024–: Warrington Town
- * Club domestic league appearances and goals

Paul Andrew Carden (born 29 March 1979) is an English former professional footballer and coach, who manages Warrington Town.

While playing at Cambridge United, Carden was also the club's assistant manager. He previously played for Blackpool, Rochdale, Chester City, Doncaster Rovers, Peterborough United, Accrington Stanley, and Burton Albion. He was a player and coach at Luton Town before leaving in January 2013, and was manager of Southport between January and November 2015.

== Playing career ==
Born in Liverpool, Merseyside, Carden made his Football League debut as a 17-year-old apprentice for Blackpool in December 1996 in a local derby defeat by Preston North End. That was to be his only first-team action for Blackpool but he enjoyed regular football with Rochdale, who he joined in March 1998. However, after falling out of favour he joined Chester City in March 2000, shortly before they were relegated out of the Football League. It was to be the start of a long association with the Cheshire club.

Carden had two spells with Chester (a brief stint at Doncaster Rovers in 2001 falling in between) and was a regular for most of his time there, chalking up more than 200 first-team appearances for the Blues. He captained the side to the Football Conference title in 2003–04 and a return to the Football League for both Carden and the club. The following season saw him named as the club's player of the season, but he was then released by new manager Keith Curle.

Carden teamed up with his former boss Mark Wright at Peterborough. His debut ironically came against Chester on the opening day of 2005–06. Later in the season, after Wright had departed, Carden became one of the central characters of the Big Ron Manager documentary series on Sky, with Ron Atkinson drafted in to help new boss Steve Bleasdale.

On 18 October 2006 it was announced that Carden had his contract with Peterborough terminated by mutual consent. He promptly registered with Burscough, who his brother Adam plays for, but immediately joined Burton Albion on a three-month loan, with a view to a permanent deal when the January transfer window opened. Carden, however, initially failed to complete the move following interest from Bury – a move failed to materialise and he signed a deal with Burton on 31 January 2007 until the end of the season. Four months later, he returned to Football League circles with Accrington Stanley but was allowed to join Cambridge United on loan in November 2007. After briefly returning to Stanley, Carden was allowed to join Cambridge for the remainder of the season on 3 January 2008. Carden was influential as Cambridge reached the Conference Premier play-off final at Wembley in May 2008.

Although initially leaving Cambridge after their defeat in the play-off final to join Wrexham, Carden returned to Cambridge on 23 June 2008 as a player and assistant manager to Gary Brabin, his first management role. He was appointed as caretaker manager at Cambridge on 13 July 2009 after Brabin left the club following a second successive play-off final defeat in May. On 22 July Carden signed a three-year deal as player and assistant manager at Cambridge, despite there being no full-time manager in place at the time. Following Martin Ling's appointment as manager, Carden returned to assistant manager duties on 27 July 2009, but was forced to regain control after Ling's unexpected departure after only nine days at the club. After managing Cambridge to a win and a loss in their first two games of the season in August 2009, Ling was reappointed as manager on 12 August, leaving Carden once again as assistant manager.

On 18 February 2011, Carden signed on loan for Luton Town until the end of the 2010–11 season, linking back up with Luton assistant manager Gary Brabin, who he had previously worked with at Cambridge. During that loan spell, Carden played against Cambridge despite being the club's assistant manager. On 16 June 2011, Carden had his contract at Cambridge United terminated. On 27 August 2011, Carden was appointed first-team coach at Luton, joining up once again with Gary Brabin, who was now the club's manager. Carden was registered as a player, and made his first appearance of the season in a 2–2 draw against Ebbsfleet United. He remained with Luton as a coach until January 2013, when his contract was terminated.

== Managerial career ==
Carden was appointed Southport manager in January 2015 following the departure of Gary Brabin to Everton. Carden successfully kept Southport in the Conference Premier with some crucial wins against Halifax, Aldershot and Torquay United. However, he left the club in November 2015. He was appointed interim manager of Tranmere Rovers in September 2016 after a spell as assistant manager. On 26 October 2016, Paul Carden was named manager of Warrington Town F.C.

On 21 November 2021, National League North side AFC Telford United appointed Carden as their First Team Manager on a two-and-a-half-year contract. The club was rooted to the bottom of the league at Christmas, but their form improved following Carden's appointment and they eventually finished the 2021/22 season in 20th place, above the relegation zone. Carden was sacked on 9 October 2022 with the club rooted to the bottom of the league table.

Carden was appointed manager of Nantwich Town in February 2023. Nantwich were relegated from the Northern Premier League on 23 April 2023.

On 21 September 2024, Carden returned to former club Warrington Town, now of the National League North. Warrington were relegated from the National League North in April 2025.

== Honours ==
Chester City

- Football Conference: 2003–04
- Player of the Season: 2004–05

Warrington Town

- Northern Premier League Play-off Winners: 2018-19
