= 2010–11 Cambridge United F.C. season =

Cambridge United
2010–11 season
- Chairman: Paul Barry
- Manager: Martin Ling; Jez George
- Conference National: 17th
- FA Cup: First round
- FA Trophy: Second round
- Top goalscorer: League: Danny Wright (10); All: Danny Wright (12)
- Highest home attendance: 3,225 v Histon (1 January 2011)
- Lowest home attendance: 1,045 v Forest Green Rovers (11 December 2010)
- Average home league attendance: 2,514
Home colours	Away colours	Third colours

The 2010–11 season was the 98th full season in the history of Cambridge United. They competed in the Conference National, finishing 17th of 24, along with various cup competitions.

After relegation from the Football League in 2005, where the club had enjoyed a 35-year stay, the club were hopeful of ending their six-year spell in non-league football following a season of consolidation under manager Martin Ling, who had taken over a club that had reached two successive play-off finals, but had lost both and was in disarray off the pitch.

However, United's season never recovered from a winless 5-game opening, and after flirting with relegation for much of the season, Ling was sacked on 1 February 2011 following a further run of four straight defeats, culminating in a 4–0 thrashing at the hands of Bath City. Jez George, manager of United's youth development team CRC, was appointed caretaker manager and oversaw the team's successful avoidance of relegation to the Conference South.

== Background ==
Cambridge United were founded in 1912 as Abbey United, named after the Abbey district of Cambridge. For many years they played amateur football until their election to the Football League in 1970. The early 1990s was Cambridge's most successful period; managed by John Beck the club won the first ever play-off final at Wembley Stadium and gained promotion from the Fourth Division before reaching two successive FA Cup quarter finals in 1990 and 1991 and winning the Third Division in 1991. The club reached the play-offs in 1992 but failed in their bid to become founder members of the Premier League. This was the club's highest final league placing to date and since then it has been in almost constant decline.

The following season the club sacked Beck and were relegated from the First Division. Further relegation followed two seasons later. United returned to Division Two but were relegated in 2002. In 2005, after 35 years in the Football League, Cambridge United were relegated into the Football Conference. This brought with it financial difficulties and the club filed for administration, coming out of it three months later after the intervention of sports minister Richard Caborn, but not before selling their Abbey Stadium home to keep the club afloat and closing the youth system.

The club's first season in the Conference National was one of stabilisation, followed by a close shave with relegation. Under the stewardship of Jimmy Quinn and Gary Brabin Cambridge made two successive play-off finals but lost both to Exeter and Torquay respectively. After a season of mid-table rebuilding under new manager Martin Ling, the club were hopeful of a push for promotion at the start of the season.

== Review ==
=== July ===
Manager Martin Ling released a number of the 2009–10 at the end of that season, including established players such as Danny Potter and Courtney Pitt, and began to rebuild the squad in time for the upcoming season with the signings of a number of players. The signings of former Histon players Danny Wright and Danny Naisbitt, along with that of Kettering defender James Jennings and York winger Simon Russell, were announced at a game to celebrate the achievements of Director of Football Jez George in raising money and awareness for the club's 'Walk for Change' in May 2010.

This flurry of signings was followed the following month with the signing of another winger in the shape of Forest Green's Conal Platt, and experienced midfielder Adam Miller, who reportedly turned down interest from League One sides Sheffield Wednesday and Bradford City to join the club. The signing of veteran striker Daryl Clare on 1 July, arriving for a fee of £10,000 on a two-year contract, led Ling to claim that his squad was all-but complete.

=== August ===
Despite general optimism at the start of the season the team started badly, with no win coming until the 6th game, at home to Eastbourne Borough. Before the victory over Eastbourne, Cambridge found themselves in 23rd place, with just 3 points from a possible 15 and only 3 goals scored, the least in the league. The away loss to Mansfield Town was particularly difficult to stomach, as the winning goal game from a hotly disputed penalty. James Jennings was sent-off for the alleged handball, which to vindicate Cambridge's complaints, was rescinded on appeal.

=== September ===
September started much more positively, with a 5–0 thrashing of Gateshead at the Abbey Stadium. The game was also notable for summer signing Daryl Clare's first goal for the club, and former Histon striker Danny Wright's first at home. Following back-to-back home wins, the club moved into a mid-table position, however this brief run of good form was not to continue: only one more win was achieved, in between losses to Luton, Newport County and AFC Wimbledon. The club's fortunes were not helped by a hip injury to winger Conal Platt, and serious ankle damage to midfielder Adam Miller. Miller's injury turned out to be particularly serious – reconstructive surgery was forecast to put him out for 6 months.

=== October ===
The month started with two more losses, to Bath City and Hayes & Yeading, leaving the club in the relegation zone. This brought the run to four consecutive losses and forced the board to issue a vote of confidence in manager Martin Ling's management. This led to something of a renaissance in form – the club went unbeaten in the month's remaining four games, and won the last three, including a 3–0 home win against Lewes in the FA Cup Fourth qualifying round. Daryl Clare, who had struggled to find his old form since joining the club with just 1 goal in 13 appearances, was ruled out for 6 weeks at the end of the month with a finger injury.

=== November ===
United's injury woes continued at the start of November, with commanding centre-back Brian Saah rule out for 6 weeks after undergoing a hernia operation. This ruled Saah out of the televised FA Cup First round tie at home to Huddersfield Town, which ended goalless, earning the club a lucrative replay. In the replay at the Galpharm Stadium, although leading through a Rory McAuley goal, Huddersfield scored twice in added time to knock the U's out.

In the league, Cambridge went unbeaten through November, picking up 6 points from their 4 goals. This included a memorable comeback against Tamworth, who were 3 goals up after 58 minutes. However, the U's rallied and goals from Robbie Willmott, Jordan Patrick (his first for the first team) and Adam Marriott saw them salvage a point. Speaking to BBC Radio Cambridgeshire, Rory McAuley, who had enjoyed an increased role in the first team, said he thought the club had come through their difficulties, and were working more as a team, saying "we're willing to work for each other and to help each other."

== Team kit ==
The team kit for the season is produced by Italian manufacturers Erreà, who took over from Vandanel who produced the club's kit for the previous three seasons.

The home kit changed from the previous season's amber shirt with a black sash, to a plain amber shirt following a premature end to Vandanel's sponsorship of the club owing to financial difficulties. The amber shorts and socks are also replaced, with all-black to be worn instead. The club's association with national brewers Greene King continues, with their IPA brand entering the second of a three-year deal to be worn on the front of shirts.

Following the success of previous seasons' votes, the club's away kit was the subject of a fans' vote. Three options were given, with fans invited to text a premium rate number with their favourite option. The winning design was a light blue and black striped shirt, which received 47% of the vote, narrowly beating a light and navy design with a curve detail which received 41%. The design is intended to remain for two seasons, and new manufacturers Erreà have confirmed they will go ahead with the fans' choice of design rather than adapting it to one of their standard designs. The kit will bear the name of sponsors Kershaw for the tenth season, a local record for shirt sponsorship, breaking the company's own record from the preceding sponsorship agreement.

== Team ==
=== First team squad ===
This shows the most up-to-date Cambridge United squad following transfers during the season. To view previous players see the appearances and discipline table which includes all players to appear in a match day squad during the season.

Note: Flags indicate national team as defined under FIFA eligibility rules; some limited exceptions apply. Players may hold more than one non-FIFA nationality.

No.	Pos.	Nation	Player
1	GK	ENG	Danny Naisbitt
2	DF	ENG	Kevin Roberts
3	DF	ENG	James Jennings
4	DF	ENG	Josh Coulson
5	DF	ENG	Brian Saah
6	DF	WAL	David Partridge
7	MF	ENG	Simon Russell
8	MF	ENG	Adam Miller
9	FW	ENG	Danny Wright
10	FW	ENG	Daryl Clare
11	MF	ENG	Robbie Willmott
12	DF	ENG	Rory McAuley

No.	Pos.	Nation	Player
14	MF	IRL	Conal Platt
15	MF	ENG	Paul Carden
16	FW	ENG	Wayne Gray
17	MF	ENG	Sam Ives
18	DF	ENG	Darryl Coakley
19	FW	ENG	Adam Marriott
20	MF	ENG	Jordan Patrick
26	DF	ENG	Blaine Hudson
27	MF	ENG	Luke Berry
30	GK	ENG	Simon Brown

=== Appearances and discipline ===
No.	Pos.	Name	League		FA Cup		FA Trophy		Total		Discipline	
No.	Pos.	Name	Apps	Goals	Apps	Goals	Apps	Goals	Apps	Goals	Yellow card	Red card
1	GK	(England) Danny Naisbitt	0	0	0	0	0	0	0	0	0	0
2	DF	(England) Kevin Roberts	4	0	0	0	0	0	4	0	0	0
3	DF	(England) James Jennings	3	0	0	0	0	0	3	0	1	0
4	MF	(England) Josh Coulson	3	0	0	0	0	0	3	0	0	0
5	DF	(England) Brian Saah	4	1	0	0	0	0	4	1	0	0
6	DF	(Wales) David Partridge	2	0	0	0	0	0	2	0	1	0
7	MF	(England) Simon Russell	4	1	0	0	0	0	4	1	0	0
8	MF	(England) Adam Miller	3	0	0	0	0	0	3	0	1	0
9	FW	(England) Danny Wright	4	1	0	0	0	0	4	1	3	0
10	FW	(England) Daryl Clare	2	0	0	0	0	0	2	0	1	0
11	MF	(England) Robbie Willmott	4	0	0	0	0	0	4	0	0	0
12	DF	(England) Rory McAuley	0	0	0	0	0	0	0	0	0	0
14	MF	(Republic of Ireland) Conal Platt	4	0	0	0	0	0	4	0	0	0
15	MF	(England) Paul Carden	4	0	0	0	0	0	4	0	2	0
16	FW	(England) Wayne Gray	2	0	0	0	0	0	2	0	0	0
17	MF	(England) Sam Ives	1	0	0	0	0	0	1	0	0	0
18	DF	(England) Darryl Coakley	0	0	0	0	0	0	0	0	0	0
19	FW	(England) Adam Marriott	4	0	0	0	0	0	4	0	0	0
20	MF	(England) Jordan Patrick	0	0	0	0	0	0	0	0	0	0
26	DF	(England) Blaine Hudson	0	0	0	0	0	0	0	0	0	0
27	MF	(England) Luke Berry	0	0	0	0	0	0	0	0	0	0
30	GK	(England) Simon Brown	4	0	0	0	0	0	4	0	0	0

Last updated: 24 August 2010
Source: Cambridge United F.C. Club Statistics

=== Top scorers ===
Includes all competitive matches. The list is sorted by squad number when total goals are equal.

Position	Nation	Squad Number	Name	League	FA Cup	FA Trophy	Total
FW	(England)	9	Danny Wright	10	1	1	12
MF	(England)	N/A	Robbie Willmott	10	0	0	10
FW	(England)	16	Wayne Gray	7	1	0	8
MF	(England)	7	Simon Russell	6	1	1	8
DF	(England)	5	Brian Saah	3	0	2	5
DF	(England)	4	Josh Coulson	4	0	0	4
FW	(England)	19	Adam Marriott	3	0	1	4
FW	(England)	29	Liam Hughes	2	0	0	2
MF	(England)	20	Jordan Patrick	2	0	0	2
DF	(England)	3	James Jennings	1	0	1	2
MF	(England)	27	Luke Berry	1	0	0	1
FW	(England)	10	Daryl Clare	1	0	0	1
MF	(England)	N/A	Dean Sinclair	1	0	0	1
MF	(England)	N/A	Mark Bentley	1	0	0	1
DF	(England)	12	Rory McAuley	0	1	0	1
DF	(England)	N/A	David Partridge	0	0	1	1
DF	(England)	2	Kevin Roberts	0	0	1	1
			Own Goals	1	0	0	1
			TOTALS	53	4	8	65

Last updated: 4 September 2010
Source: BBC Sport

=== Overall ===
This table takes account of all competitive matches.

	Statistic	Notes
Games played	52	46 in the League, 3 in the FA Cup, 3 in the FA Trophy
Games won	13	11 in the League, 1 in the FA Cup, 1 in the FA Trophy
Games drawn	19	17 in the League, 1 in the FA Cup, 1 in the FA Trophy
Games lost	20	18 in the League, 1 in the FA Cup, 1 in the FA Trophy
Goals scored	65	See Top Scorers table above for distribution
Goals conceded	73	
Goal difference	8	
Clean sheets	14	
Yellow cards	73	
Red cards	6	The red card awarded to James Jennings for a deliberate handball in the 1–0 defeat at Mansfield Town on 28 August 2010 was subsequently rescinded by the FA, and is therefore not included in this total.
Worst discipline	James Jennings	2 red card, 8 yellow cards
Best result	5–0	v. Gateshead, 4 September 2010
Worst result	1–5; 0–4	v. Mansfield Town, 23 December 2010 v. Bath City, 29 January 2011
Most appearances	47	Wright
Top scorer	10	Willmott, Wright
Points	50	Out of a possible 138 (36%)

Last updated: 30 April 2011
Source: Cambridge United

== Match results ==
Match won	Match drawn	Match lost

=== Pre-season ===
Friendlies
Kick Off	Opponents	H / A	Result	Scorers	Attendance	Report
17 July 2010	(England) St Ives Town ^{[A]}	A	1–1	Hudson 46'	536	Report
21 July 2010	(England) Mildenhall Town	A	2–0	Wright 38'; Marriott 48'	Unknown	Report
24 July 2010	(England) Lowestoft Town	A	1–2	Gray 9'	542	Report
26 July 2010	(England) King's Lynn ^{[A]}	A	1–4	Unknown	Unknown	N/A
27 July 2010	(England) Colchester United	H	0–1	–	941	Report
29 July 2010	(England) Cambridge City	A	3–3	Hughes 31, 62'; Berry 88'	Unknown	Report
31 July 2010	(England) Leyton Orient	H	1–3	Willmott 90'	1,037	Report
2 August 2010	(England) Godmanchester Rovers ^{[A]}	A	2–1	Patrick 21', 70'	130 (approx)	Report
3 August 2010	(England) Bury Town	A	4–0	Miller 28; Marriott 63', 73, 82'	Unknown	Report
7 August 2010	(England) Bishop's Stortford	A	4–2	Wright 18', 28'; Miller 22'; Willmott 74'	408	Report

A. The club competed in some friendlies as a Cambridge United XI, rather than a full first team. Where indicated, a Cambridge United XI team played which featured more a mixture of squad players and trialists than in other games.

=== League ===
==== Results by round ====
Round	1	2	3	4	5	6	7	8	9	10	11	12	13	14	15	16	17	18	19	20	21	22	23	24	25	26	27	28	29	30	31	32	33	34	35	36	37	38	39	40	41	42	43	44	45	46
Ground	A	H	H	A	A	H	H	A	A	H	H	A	H	A	A	H	A	H	A	H	H	H	H	A	A	H	A	A	A	H	A	H	H	A	A	A	A	H	H	H	A	H	A	H	A	H
Result	L	D	D	D	L	W	W	L	D	W	L	L	L	L	D	W	W	D	D	D	W	L	D	W	W	L	L	L	L	L	D	L	L	W	D	L	D	D	W	D	D	D	L	W	D	L
Position	18	18	21	21	23	17	11	17	18	13	15	16	19	21	22	18	14	14	15	15	13	13	14	12	10	14	16	16	16	17	17	17	17	17	16	17	17	17	16	16	16	17	18	17	17	17

Updated to match(es) played on 30 April 2011. Source: Matches
A = Away; H = Home; W = Win; D = Draw; L = Loss

==== Matches ====
14 August 2010
15:00 BST

Wrexham	1–0	Cambridge United
Morell 25'	Report

Racecourse Ground, Wrexham
Attendance: 4,040
Referee: S. Bratt

17 August 2010
19:45 BST

Cambridge United	2–2	Crawley Town
Russell 18'; Saah 29'	Report	Tubbs 5, 8'

Abbey Stadium, Cambridge
Attendance: 2,558
Referee: M. Bull

21 August 2010
15:00 BST

Cambridge United	0–0	Southport
	Report

Abbey Stadium, Cambridge
Attendance: 2,506
Referee: M. Stewart

24 August 2010
19:45 BST

Tamworth	1–1	Cambridge United
Bradley 82'	Report	Wright 54'

The Lamb Ground, Tamworth
Attendance: 863
Referee: D. Handley

28 August 2010
15:00 BST

Mansfield Town	1–0	Cambridge United
Parker 62' (pen.)	Report	Jennings (red card) 61'

Field Mill, Mansfield
Attendance: 2,257
Referee: D. Bond

30 August 2010
15:00 BST

Cambridge United	2–0	Eastbourne Borough
Coulson 7'; Jennings 43'	Report

Abbey Stadium, Cambridge
Attendance: 2,465
Referee: S. Burt

4 September 2010
15:00 BST

Cambridge United	5–0	Gateshead
Wright 28'; Clare 53'; Russell 74'; Saah 76'; Gray 82'	Report

Abbey Stadium, Cambridge
Attendance: 2,637
Referee: A. Fearn

11 September 2010
15:00 BST

Luton Town	2–0	Cambridge United
Drury 34'; G.Pilkington 45'	Report

Kenilworth Road, Luton
Attendance: 6,691
Referee: D. Mohareb

18 September 2010
15:00 BST

Kidderminster Harries	0–0	Cambridge United
	Report

Aggborough Stadium, Kidderminster
Attendance: 1,291
Referee: A. Madley

21 September 2010
19:45 BST

Cambridge United	3–0	Kettering Town
Gray 71'; Willmott 80'; Wright 82'	Report	Westwood (red card) 90'

Abbey Stadium, Cambridge
Attendance: 2,646
Referee: Ian Cooper

25 September 2010
15:00 BST

Cambridge United	0–1	Newport County
	Report	Collins 3'

Abbey Stadium, Cambridge
Attendance: 2,648
Referee: S. J Long

29 September 2010
19:45 BST

AFC Wimbledon	3–0	Cambridge United
Franks 69,90'; Jolley 75'	Report

Kingsmeadow, Kingston upon Thames
Attendance: 3,119
Referee: Andrew Davies

2 October 2010
15:00 BST

Cambridge United	1–2	Bath City
Russell 5'	Report	Canham 28'; Mohamed 90'

Abbey Stadium, Cambridge
Attendance: 2,670
Referee: Tim Robinson

5 October 2010
19:45 BST

Hayes & Yeading United	2–0	Cambridge United
Malcolm 11'; Pritchard 71'	Report

Church Road, Hayes
Attendance: 362
Referee: Lee Collins

10 October 2010
16:00 BST

Fleetwood Town	2–2	Cambridge United
Vieira 7'; McNulty 54'	Report	Willmott 8,81'

Highbury Stadium, Fleetwood
Attendance: 2,380
Referee: Robert Merchant

16 October 2010
15:00 BST

Cambridge United	3–1	Barrow
Russell 14'; Pearson (OG) 45+2'; Coulson 89'	Report	Owen 79'

Abbey Stadium, Cambridge
Attendance: 2,726
Referee: Richard Wigglesworth

30 October 2010
15:00 BST

Gateshead	2–3	Cambridge United
Shaw 29, 54'	Report	Coulson 28'; Gray 31'; Russell 45'

Gateshead International Stadium, Gateshead
Attendance: 1,083
Referee: Peter Wright

9 November 2010
19:45 GMT

Cambridge United	1–1	Grimsby Town
Wright 22'	Report	Eagle 41'

Abbey Stadium, Cambridge
Attendance: 2,303
Referee: M Bull

13 November 2010
15:00 GMT

Kettering Town	2–2	Cambridge United
Green 66'; Furlong 70'	Report	Willmott 38, 45'

Rockingham Road, Kettering
Attendance: 1,959
Referee: M Thompson

20 November 2010
15:00 GMT

Cambridge United	3–3	Tamworth
Willmott 68'; Patrick 75'; Marriott 77'	Report	Thomas 20, 58'; Perry 32'

Abbey Stadium, Cambridge
Attendance: 2,809
Referee: Lee Collins

27 November 2010
15:00 GMT

Cambridge United	4–0	Altrincham
Wright 15, 65'; Gray 23, 56'	Report

Abbey Stadium, Cambridge
Attendance: 2,123
Referee: S J Long

28 December 2010
15:00 GMT

Cambridge United	1–5	Mansfield Town
Willmott 66'	Report	Murray 33'; Smith 37'; Duffy 73'; Coulson (OG) 90'; Mitchley 90+3'

Abbey Stadium, Cambridge
Attendance: 2,505
Referee: Lee Collins

1 January 2011
15:00 GMT

Cambridge United	0–0	Histon
	Report

Abbey Stadium, Cambridge
Attendance: 3,225
Referee: Russell Fletcher

3 January 2011
15:00 GMT

Eastbourne Borough	0–2	Cambridge United
	Report	Willmott 3'; Gray 32'

Priory Lane, Eastbourne
Attendance: 983
Referee: Tim Robinson

8 January 2011
15:00 GMT

Barrow	1–2	Cambridge United
Almond 90'	Report	Willmott 18'; Gray 54'; Jennings (red card) 85'

Holker Street, Barrow-in-Furness
Attendance: 1,015
Referee: B Khatib

22 January 2011
15:00 GMT

Cambridge United	1–3	Wrexham
Willmott 59'; Saah (red card) 64'	Report	Mangan 2'; Pogba 14'; Blackburn 20'

Abbey Stadium, Cambridge
Attendance: 2,469
Referee: Rob Whitton

25 January 2011
19:45 GMT

Crawley Town	3–0	Cambridge United
McAllister 61, 85'; Cook 69'	Report

Broadfield Stadium, Crawley
Attendance: 3,241
Referee: John Hopkins

29 January 2011
15:00 GMT

Bath City	4–0	Cambridge United
Canham 47'; Mohamed 78, 88'; Murray 83'	Report

Twerton Park, Bath
Attendance: 1,338
Referee: Carl Berry

1 February 2011
19:45 GMT

Rushden & Diamonds	2–1	Cambridge United
Smith 74'; Farrell 89'	Report	Wright 3'

Nene Park, Irthlingborough
Attendance: 1,279
Referee: S Martinson

5 February 2011
15:00 GMT

Cambridge United	0–2	Rushden & Diamonds
	Report	O'Connor 14'; Day 21'

Abbey Stadium, Cambridge
Attendance: 2,366
Referee: Russell Fletcher

12 February 2011
15:00 GMT

Grimsby Town	1–1	Cambridge United
Sinclair 8'	Report	Coulson 61'

Blundell Park, Cleethorpes
Attendance: 3,142
Referee: Andy Madley

15 February 2011
19:45 GMT

Cambridge United	0–1	Darlington
	Report	Smith 50'

Abbey Stadium, Cambridge
Attendance: 1,635
Referee: Chris Knowles

18 February 2011
19:45 GMT

Cambridge United	1–2	Kidderminster Harriers
Marriott 90+1'	Report	Canham 42'; Matt 90+2'

Abbey Stadium, Cambridge
Attendance: 1,869
Referee: Carl Berry

22 February 2011
19:45 GMT

Histon	0–2	Cambridge United
	Report	Wright 44'; Marriott 50'

Bridge Road, Impington
Attendance: 1,903
Referee: Kevin Johnson

1 March 2011
19:45 GMT

Newport County	1–1	Cambridge United
Collins 52'	Report	Russell 9'

Newport Stadium, Newport
Attendance: 1,360
Referee: A Bennett

5 March 2011
15:00 GMT

Darlington	1–0	Cambridge United
Hatch 67'	Report

The Darlington Arena, Darlington
Attendance: 2,080
Referee: Darren Bond

12 March 2011
15:00 GMT

Southport	1–1	Cambridge United
Kissock 55'	Report	Berry 90+2'; Marriott (red card) 32'

Haig Avenue, Southport
Attendance: 1,107
Referee: Robert Merchant

15 March 2011
19:45 GMT

Cambridge United	0–0	Luton Town
	Report

Abbey Stadium, Cambridge
Attendance: 2,821
Referee: Carl Berry

19 March 2011
15:00 GMT

Cambridge United	2–1	York City
Hughes 19'; Wright 78'	Report	Reed 24'

Abbey Stadium, Cambridge
Attendance: 2,471
Referee: N Kinseley

26 March 2011
15:00 GMT

Cambridge United	1–1	Forest Green Rovers
Bentley 43'	Report	Forbes 81'

Abbey Stadium, Cambridge
Attendance: 2,086
Referee: D Ford

2 April 2011
15:00 BST

Altrincham	2–2	Cambridge United
Lawton 27'; Reeves 34' (pen)	Report	Hughes 39'; Saah 59'

Moss Lane, Altrincham
Attendance: 1,161
Referee: Wayne Barratt

9 April 2011
15:00 BST

Cambridge United	1–2	AFC Wimbledon
Wright 82'	Report	Johnson 11'; Mohamed 32'

Abbey Stadium, Cambridge
Attendance: 2,907
Referee: A Madley

16 April 2011
15:00 BST

Forest Green Rovers	1–1	Cambridge United
Matthews 45+7'	Report	Sinclair 45+4'

The New Lawn, Nailsworth
Attendance: 1,092
Referee: Andy Davies

23 April 2011
15:00 BST

Cambridge United	1–0	Hayes & Yeading United
Patrick 76'; Jennings (red card) 27'	Report

Abbey Stadium, Cambridge
Attendance: 2,619
Referee: Nick Kinseley

25 April 2011
15:00 BST

York City	0–0	Cambridge United
	Report

Bootham Crescent, York
Attendance: 2,929
Referee: B Khatib

30 April 2011
17:00 BST

Cambridge United	0–1	Fleetwood Town
	Report	Harvey 77'

Abbey Stadium, Cambridge
Attendance: 2,745
Referee: M Bull

=== FA Cup ===
23 October 2010 Fourth qualifying round	Cambridge United	3 – 0	Lewes	Cambridge
15:00	Forrester 4'	Report	Gray 22'; Wright 35'; Russell 47'	Stadium: Abbey Stadium; Attendance: 1,626; Referee: Richard West

6 November 2010 First round	Cambridge United	0 – 0	Huddersfield Town	Cambridge
17:30		Report		Stadium: Abbey Stadium; Attendance: 3,127; Referee: Paul Tierney

16 November 2010 First round replay	Huddersfield Town	2 – 1	Cambridge United	Huddersfield
19:45	Peltier 91'; Roberts 94'	Report	McAuley 53'	Stadium: Galpharm Stadium; Attendance: 3,766; Referee: G Salisbury

=== FA Trophy ===
11 December 2010 First round	Cambridge United	2 – 1	Forest Green Rovers	Cambridge
15:00	Partridge 56'; Roberts 90'	Report	Klukowski 84'	Stadium: Abbey Stadium; Attendance: 1,045; Referee: W. Atkin

15 January 2010 Second round	Alfreton Town	3 – 3	Cambridge United	Alfreton
15:00	Hall 53'; Wilson 60'; Flint 73'	Report	Russell 40'; Saah 66'; Marriott 88'	Stadium: North Street; Attendance: 929; Referee: unknown

18 January 2011 Second round replay	Cambridge United	3 – 6	Alfreton Town	Cambridge
19:45	Saah 40'; Wright 69'; Jennings 89'	Report	Law 24'; Clayton 78, 96, 116'; Brown 83'; Wilson 110'	Stadium: Abbey Stadium; Attendance: 1,098; Referee: unknown

== Transfers ==
=== In ===
No.	Pos.	Nat.	Name	Age	EU	Moving from	Type	Transfer window	Ends	Transfer fee	Source
9	FW	(England)	Danny Wright	25	EU	Histon	Transfer	Summer	2012	Free	BBC Sport
3	DF	(England)	James Jennings	22	EU	Kettering Town	Transfer	Summer	2012	Free	BBC Sport
1	GK	(England)	Danny Naisbitt	31	EU	Histon	Transfer	Summer	2012	Free	BBC Sport
7	MF	(England)	Simon Russell	25	EU	York City	Transfer	Summer	2012	Free	BBC Sport
14	FW	(England)	Conal Platt	23	EU	Forest Green Rovers	Transfer	Summer	2012	Free	Cambridge United
8	FW	(England)	Adam Miller	28	EU	Gillingham	Transfer	Summer	2013	Free	BBC Sport
10	FW	(England)	Daryl Clare	31	EU	Gateshead	Transfer	Summer	2012	£10,000	BBC Sport

Last updated: 14 July 2010

=== Out ===
No.	Pos.	Nat.	Name	Age	EU	Moving to	Type	Transfer window	Transfer fee	Source
1	GK	(England)	Danny Potter	31	EU	Torquay United	Released	Summer	N/A	BBC Sport
3	DF	(England)	Aiden Palmer	23	EU	Bishop's Stortford	Released	Summer	N/A	Cambridge United
8	FW	(England)	Antonio Murray	25	EU	Histon	Released	Summer	N/A	Cambridge United
6	MF	(England)	Jai Reason	20	EU		Released	Summer	N/A	Cambridge United
8	FW	(England)	Lee Phillips	29	EU	Bath City	Released	Summer	N/A	Cambridge United
29	FW	(England)	Calum Willock	28	EU	Ebbsfleet United	Released	Summer	N/A	Cambridge United
11	MF	(England)	Courtney Pitt	28	EU	A.F.C. Telford United	Released	Summer	N/A	Cambridge United
8	MF	(England)	Ben Farrell	23	EU		Released	Summer	N/A	Cambridge United
7	FW	(England)	Mark Beesley	29	EU		Released	Summer	N/A	Cambridge United
2	DF	(England)	Dan Gleeson	25	EU	Luton Town	Transfer	Summer	Free	BBC Sport
10	FW	(England)	Danny Crow	25	EU	Luton Town	Transfer	Summer	Free	Luton Town

Last updated: 14 July 2010

== Backroom staff ==
Job title	Name
Manager	(England) Martin Ling (until 1 February 2011) (England) Jez George (appointed 1 February 2011)
Player/Assistant Manager	(England) Paul Carden
Director of Youth Football	(England) Jez George
Centre of Excellence Manager	(England) Marc Tracy
Physiotherapist	(England) Greg Reid
Consultant Orthopaedic Surgeon	(England) Dennis Edwards
Medical Officer	(England) Dr M Wharton

== See also ==
- 2010–11 in English football
- 2010–11 Football Conference
