= 1999–2000 Wolverhampton Wanderers F.C. season =

English football club season

Wolverhampton Wanderers
1999–2000 season
- Chairman: Sir Jack Hayward OBE
- Manager: Colin Lee
- Football League First Division: 7th
- FA Cup: 4th round
- League Cup: 1st round
- Top goalscorer: League: Ade Akinbiyi (16); All: Ade Akinbiyi (16)
- Highest home attendance: 25,500 (vs West Brom, 3 October 1999)
- Lowest home attendance: 13,723 (vs Wycombe, 24 August 1999)
- Average home league attendance: 21,470 (league only)

The 1999–2000 season was the 101st season of competitive league football in the history of English football club Wolverhampton Wanderers. They played the season in the second tier of the English football system, the Football League First Division.

For a second consecutive season the team finished in seventh position, missing out on the play-offs by one place. Defeat in their penultimate match to play-off rivals Bolton Wanderers ultimately doomed them to miss out.

== Results ==
=== Pre-season ===
Wolves spent several weeks of pre-season training in Sölvesborg, Sweden. They played against four local sides during this tour, their first visit to the country since 1994, before returning home to face further opposition.

13 July 1999	Olofströms IK	2–3	Wolverhampton Wanderers	Olofström, Sweden
	Olufsson 67'; Ringberg 87' (pen.)		Ekelund 21'; Emblen 28'; Sinton 51' (pen.)	Stadium: Lilla Holje; Attendance: 700

14 July 1999	IFK Hässleholm	2–3	Wolverhampton Wanderers	Hässleholm, Sweden
	Edfor 15'; Carls 78'		Robinson 37'; Jones 60'; Keane 69'	Stadium: Österås; Attendance: 558

16 July 1999	IFÖ Bromölla	0–3	Wolverhampton Wanderers	Bromölla, Sweden
			Van Riel 11'; Gustavsson 30' (o.g.); Ekelund 55'	Stadium: Strandängen; Attendance: 550

17 July 1999	Sölvesborg XI	3–4	Wolverhampton Wanderers	Sölvesborg, Sweden
	Torstensson 7' (pen.); M. Nilsson 14'; B. Nilsson 68'		Taylor 11'; Flo 62'; Keane 64'; Muscat 90' (pen.)	Stadium: Svarta Led; Attendance: 500

20 July 1999	Wolverhampton Wanderers	0–2	Liverpool	Wolverhampton
			Fowler 26'; Riedle 80'	Stadium: Molineux; Attendance: 24,630

24 July 1999	Cheltenham Town	0–1	Wolverhampton Wanderers	Cheltenham
			Robinson 8'	Stadium: Whaddon Road; Attendance: 2,357

27 July 1999	Wolverhampton Wanderers	1–1	Werder Bremen	Wolverhampton
	Bazeley 87'		Bogdanović 81'	Stadium: Molineux; Attendance: 4,485

31 July 1999	Wolverhampton Wanderers	1–1	Tottenham Hotspur	Wolverhampton
	Bazeley 74'		Iversen 53'	Stadium: Molineux; Attendance: 11,418

"Wolves XI" pre season results (all away): 0–1 vs Hereford United (21 July), 3–1 vs Tiverton (28 July), A–A vs Telford United (2 August, abandoned at half time due to lightning)

=== Football League First Division ===
A total of 24 teams competed in the Football League First Division in the 1999–2000 season. Each team played every other team twice: once at their stadium, and once at the opposition's. Three points were awarded to teams for each win, one point per draw, and none for defeats.

The provisional fixture list was released on 24 June 1999, but was subject to change in the event of matches being selected for television coverage or police concerns.

8 August 1999 1	Manchester City	0–1	Wolverhampton Wanderers	Manchester
13:00 BST		Report	Keane 30'	Stadium: Maine Road; Attendance: 31,755 (2,100 away); Referee: Terry Heilbron

14 August 1999 2	Wolverhampton Wanderers	1–1	Portsmouth	Wolverhampton
15:00 BST	Keane 48'	Report	Allen 36'	Stadium: Molineux; Attendance: 21,024 (1,216 away); Referee: Roger Furnandiz

21 August 1999 3	Queens Park Rangers	1–1	Wolverhampton Wanderers	London
15:00 BST	Peacock 75'	Report	Corica 35'	Stadium: Loftus Road; Attendance: 13,238 (1,674 away); Referee: Tony Leake

28 August 1999 4	Wolverhampton Wanderers	1–2	Walsall	Wolverhampton
15:00 BST	Robinson 31'	Report	Barras 3'; Rammell 45'	Stadium: Molineux; Attendance: 24,439 (3,189 away); Referee: Paul Robinson

11 September 1999 5	Wolverhampton Wanderers	0–1	Huddersfield Town	Wolverhampton
15:00 BST		Report	Stewart 60' (pen.)	Stadium: Molineux; Attendance: 20,385 (1,264 away); Referee: Rob Harris

19 September 1999 6	Nottingham Forest	1–1	Wolverhampton Wanderers	Nottingham
13:00 BST	Allou 46'	Report	Bazeley 18'	Stadium: City Ground; Attendance: 20,694 (1,516 away); Referee: Roy Pearson

25 September 1999 7	Sheffield United	3–0	Wolverhampton Wanderers	Sheffield
15:00 BST	Smith 56', 69'; Devlin 58'	Report		Stadium: Bramall Lane; Attendance: 14,163 (1,009 away); Referee: Paul Danson

28 September 1999 8	Crystal Palace	1–1	Wolverhampton Wanderers	London
19:45 BST	Bradbury 55'	Report	Akinbiyi 43'	Stadium: Selhurst Park; Attendance: 12,720 (928 away); Referee: Clive Wilkes

3 October 1999 9	Wolverhampton Wanderers	1–1	West Bromwich Albion	Wolverhampton
13:00 BST	Akinbiyi 41'	Report	Carbon 76'	Stadium: Molineux; Attendance: 25,500 (3,196 away); Referee: William Burns

9 October 1999 10	Wolverhampton Wanderers	1–0	Bolton Wanderers	Wolverhampton
15:00 BST	Akinbiyi 3'	Report		Stadium: Molineux; Attendance: 18,665 (987 away); Referee: Paul Taylor

16 October 1999 11	Barnsley	1–2	Wolverhampton Wanderers	Barnsley
15:00 BST	Hignett 81'	Report	Taylor 5'; Akinbiyi 33'	Stadium: Oakwell; Attendance: 14,923 (1,237 away); Referee: Alan Wilkie

19 October 1999 12	Fulham	0–1	Wolverhampton Wanderers	London
19:45 BST		Report	Emblen 56'	Stadium: Craven Cottage; Attendance: 13,160 (1,424 away); Referee: Mike Dean

23 October 1999 13	Wolverhampton Wanderers	2–2	Port Vale	Wolverhampton
15:00 BST	Sedgley 47'; Curle 89' (pen.)	Report	Walsh 80'; Rougier 84'	Stadium: Molineux; Attendance: 20,488 (653 away); Referee: Phil Richards

26 October 1999 14	Wolverhampton Wanderers	1–0	Sheffield United	Wolverhampton
19:45 BST	Emblen 89'	Report		Stadium: Molineux; Attendance: 24,402 (745 away); Referee: David Pugh

31 October 1999 15	West Bromwich Albion	1–1	Wolverhampton Wanderers	West Bromwich
13:00 GMT	McDermott 13'	Report	Akinbiyi 82'	Stadium: The Hawthorns; Attendance: 21,097 (5,100 away); Referee: Kevin Lynch

6 November 1999 16	Wolverhampton Wanderers	3–0	Grimsby Town	Wolverhampton
15:00 GMT	Akinbiyi 6', 79', 89'	Report		Stadium: Molineux; Attendance: 19,036 (406 away); Referee: Chris Foy

20 November 1999 17	Wolverhampton Wanderers	1–1	Swindon Town	Wolverhampton
15:00 GMT	Flo 81'	Report	Onuora 27' (pen.)	Stadium: Molineux; Attendance: 19,917 (596 away); Referee: Steve Baines

24 November 1999 18	Ipswich Town	1–0	Wolverhampton Wanderers	Ipswich
19:45 GMT	Scowcroft 56'	Report		Stadium: Portman Road; Attendance: 15,731 (685 away); Referee: George Cain

27 November 1999 19	Tranmere Rovers	1–0	Wolverhampton Wanderers	Birkenhead
15:00 GMT	Allison 50'	Report		Stadium: Prenton Park; Attendance: 8,017 (1,383 away); Referee: Mike Riley

3 December 1999 20	Wolverhampton Wanderers	4–1	Manchester City	Wolverhampton
19:45 GMT	Akinbiyi 5'; Branch 18', 40'; Muscat 68'	Report	Goater 30'	Stadium: Molineux; Attendance: 21,635 (3,196 away); Referee: Steve Bennett

14 December 1999 21	Crewe Alexandra	1–0	Wolverhampton Wanderers	Crewe
19:45 GMT	Tait 83'	Report		Stadium: Gresty Road; Attendance: 6,018 (908 away); Referee: Roger Furnandiz

17 December 1999 22	Wolverhampton Wanderers	2–1	Birmingham City	Wolverhampton
19:45 GMT	Akinbiyi 39'; Pollet 63'	Report	Hughes 15'	Stadium: Molineux; Attendance: 19,724 (1,757 away); Referee: Tony Leake

26 December 1999 23	Stockport County	3–2	Wolverhampton Wanderers	Stockport
13:30 GMT	Dinning 31'; Moore 51', 90'	Report	Emblen 12'; Pollet 37'	Stadium: Edgeley Park; Attendance: 10,278 (2,236 away); Referee: Graham Laws

28 December 1999 24	Wolverhampton Wanderers	1–0	Norwich City	Wolverhampton
15:00 GMT	Branch 57'	Report		Stadium: Molineux; Attendance: 25,072 (2,904 away); Referee: Frazer Stretton

3 January 2000 25	Blackburn Rovers	1–1	Wolverhampton Wanderers	Blackburn
15:00 GMT	Østenstad 39'	Report	Naylor 36'	Stadium: Ewood Park; Attendance: 24,743 (2,464 away); Referee: Graham Frankland

11 January 2000 26	Wolverhampton Wanderers	2–3	Charlton Athletic	Wolverhampton
19:45 GMT	Flo 18'; Pringle 76' (o.g.)	Report	Rufus 41'; Pringle 45'; Robinson 71'	Stadium: Molineux; Attendance: 18,464 (539 away); Referee: Mark Halsey

15 January 2000 27	Portsmouth	2–3	Wolverhampton Wanderers	Portsmouth
15:00 GMT	Igoe 19'; Claridge 23'	Report	Sedgley 73'; Branch 85'; Akinbiyi 89'	Stadium: Fratton Park; Attendance: 13,255 (1,498 away); Referee: Andy Butler

22 January 2000 28	Wolverhampton Wanderers	3–2	Queens Park Rangers	Wolverhampton
15:00 GMT	Sedgley 22'; Branch 23'; Akinbiyi 29'	Report	Peacock 79'; Slade 89'	Stadium: Molineux; Attendance: 20,069 (1,445 away); Referee: Scott Mathieson

29 January 2000 29	Walsall	1–1	Wolverhampton Wanderers	Walsall
15:00 GMT	Barras 80'	Report	Emblen 76'	Stadium: Bescot Stadium; Attendance: 9,422 (2,000 away); Referee: Peter Jones

5 February 2000 30	Wolverhampton Wanderers	2–1	Crystal Palace	Wolverhampton
15:00 GMT	Sedgley 15'; Pollet 47'	Report	Martin 64'	Stadium: Molineux; Attendance: 20,756 (1,203 away); Referee: Trevor Jones

12 February 2000 31	Charlton Athletic	2–0	Wolverhampton Wanderers	London
15:00 GMT	Stuart 48'; Brown 69'	Report		Stadium: The Valley; Attendance: 20,043 (1,650 away); Referee: David Laws

16 February 2000 32	Wolverhampton Wanderers	4–0	Tranmere Rovers	Wolverhampton
19:45 GMT	Akinbiyi 35', 88'; Naylor 45'; Bazeley 69'	Report		Stadium: Molineux; Attendance: 18,186 (423 away); Referee: John Kirkby

26 February 2000 33	Wolverhampton Wanderers	3–0	Nottingham Forest	Wolverhampton
15:00 GMT	Pollet 8'; Bazeley 20'; Branch 25'	Report		Stadium: Molineux; Attendance: 24,444 (1,500 away); Referee: Steve Lodge

4 March 2000 34	Huddersfield Town	2–0	Wolverhampton Wanderers	Huddersfield
15:00 GMT	Smith 20', 34'			Stadium: McAlpine Stadium; Attendance: 17,214 (2,133 away); Referee: David Elleray

7 March 2000 35	Grimsby Town	1–0	Wolverhampton Wanderers	Cleethorpes
19:45 GMT	Clare 18'	Report		Stadium: Blundell Park; Attendance: 5,575 (713 away); Referee: Barry Knight

11 March 2000 36	Wolverhampton Wanderers	2–1	Ipswich Town	Wolverhampton
15:00 GMT	Flo 4', 46'	Report	Scowcroft 75'	Stadium: Molineux; Attendance: 22,652 (2,585 away); Referee: Mike Jones

18 March 2000 37	Swindon Town	1–2	Wolverhampton Wanderers	Swindon
15:00 GMT	Williams 82'	Report	Muscat 58'; Robinson 85'	Stadium: County Ground; Attendance: 8,748 (3,281 away); Referee: Mike Pike

21 March 2000 38	Wolverhampton Wanderers	2–0	Crewe Alexandra	Wolverhampton
19:45 GMT	Sedgley 14'; Taylor 68'	Report		Stadium: Molineux; Attendance: 20,444 (346 away); Referee: David Crick

25 March 2000 39	Wolverhampton Wanderers	2–2	Stockport County	Wolverhampton
15:00 GMT	Curle 43' (pen.); Emblen 90'	Report	Lawson 16'; Dinning 62'	Stadium: Molineux; Attendance: 25,065 (678 away); Referee: Rob Styles

1 April 2000 40	Birmingham City	1–0	Wolverhampton Wanderers	Birmingham
15:00 BST	Holdsworth 53'	Report	Curle (penalty missed) 24'	Stadium: St Andrew's; Attendance: 29,050 (2,925 away); Referee: Eddie Wolstenholme

8 April 2000 41	Wolverhampton Wanderers	2–1	Blackburn Rovers	Wolverhampton
15:00 BST	Muscat 40' (pen.); Nielsen 72'	Report	Duff 54'	Stadium: Molineux; Attendance: 22,286 (2,153 away); Referee: David Pugh

15 April 2000 42	Norwich City	1–0	Wolverhampton Wanderers	Norwich
15:00 BST	Roberts 50'	Report		Stadium: Carrow Road; Attendance: 15,910 (1,426 away); Referee: Andy D'Urso

22 April 2000 43	Wolverhampton Wanderers	2–0	Barnsley	Wolverhampton
15:00 BST	Akinbiyi 43', 52'	Report		Stadium: Molineux; Attendance: 21,251 (2,313 away); Referee: Anthony Bates

30 April 2000 44	Wolverhampton Wanderers	3–0	Fulham	Wolverhampton
13:00 BST	Nielsen 50'; Muscat 60' (pen.); Taylor 90'	Report		Stadium: Molineux; Attendance: 19,912 (616 away); Referee: William Burns

3 May 2000 45	Bolton Wanderers	2–1	Wolverhampton Wanderers	Bolton
20:00 BST	Jensen 60'; Gudjohnsen 70'	Report	Pollet 45'	Stadium: Reebok Stadium; Attendance: 18,871 (2,568 away); Referee: Kevin Lynch

7 May 2000 46	Port Vale	0–1	Wolverhampton Wanderers	Burslem
13:30 BST		Report	Robinson 85'	Stadium: Vale Park; Attendance: 8,525 (1,971 away); Referee: Clive Wilkes

Final table

Pos	Team	Pld	W	D	L	GF	GA	GD	Pts	Qualification or relegation
5	Birmingham City	46	22	11	13	65	44	+21	77	Qualification for the First Division play-offs
6	Bolton Wanderers	46	21	13	12	69	50	+19	76	Qualification for the First Division play-offs
7	Wolverhampton Wanderers	46	21	11	14	64	48	+16	74	
8	Huddersfield Town	46	21	11	14	62	49	+13	74	
9	Fulham	46	17	16	13	49	41	+8	67	

Rules for classification: 1) Points; 2) Goal difference; 3) Goals scored

Source: Statto.com Results summary

Overall								Home						Away					
Pld	W	D	L	GF	GA	GD	Pts	W	D	L	GF	GA	GD	W	D	L	GF	GA	GD
46	21	11	14	64	48	+16	74	15	5	3	45	20	+25	6	6	11	19	28	−9

Source: Statto.com

Results by round

Round	1	2	3	4	5	6	7	8	9	10	11	12	13	14	15	16	17	18	19	20	21	22	23	24	25	26	27	28	29	30	31	32	33	34	35	36	37	38	39	40	41	42	43	44	45	46
Result	W	D	D	L	L	D	L	D	D	W	W	W	D	W	D	W	D	L	L	W	L	W	L	W	D	L	W	W	D	W	L	W	W	L	L	W	W	W	D	L	W	L	W	W	L	W
Position	5	6	7	13	18	19	21	22	20	18	12	10	10	9	10	10	11	11	11	10	12	10	12	10	11	11	10	6	6	6	7	7	7	7	8	7	7	7	7	7	7	7	7	7	8	7

Source: Statto.com
W = Win; D = Draw; L = Loss

=== FA Cup ===
11 December 1999 R3	Wigan Athletic	0–1	Wolverhampton Wanderers	Wigan
15:00 GMT		Report	Robinson 90'	Stadium: JJB Stadium; Attendance: 10,531 (1,392 away); Referee: Clive Wilkes

8 January 2000 R4	Sheffield Wednesday	1–1	Wolverhampton Wanderers	Sheffield
15:00 GMT	Alexandersson 9'	Report	Sedgley 68'	Stadium: Hillsborough; Attendance: 18,506 (7,450 away); Referee: Graham Barber

18 January 2000 R4 rep.	Wolverhampton Wanderers	0–0 (3–4 p)	Sheffield Wednesday	Wolverhampton
19:45 GMT		Report		Stadium: Molineux; Attendance: 25,201 (1,500 away); Referee: Graham Barber
	Penalties
	Curle (penalty scored); Simpson (penalty missed); Branch (penalty missed); Sedgley (penalty scored); Corica (penalty scored)		(penalty scored) Hinchcliffe; (penalty scored) Jonk; (penalty scored) Sibon; (penalty missed) Cresswell; (penalty scored) Donnelly

=== League Cup ===
10 August 1999 R1.1	Wycombe Wanderers	0–1	Wolverhampton Wanderers	High Wycombe
19:45 BST		Report	Curle 54' (pen.)	Stadium: Adams Park; Attendance: 4,564 (1,316 away); Referee: Rob Styles

24 August 1999 R1.2	Wolverhampton Wanderers	2–4 (3–4 agg.)	Wycombe Wanderers	Wolverhampton
19:45 BST	Larkin 71'; Emblen 89'	Report	Muscat 11' (o.g.); McSporran 26', 59'; Ryan 85'	Stadium: Molineux; Attendance: 13,723 (572 away); Referee: Mike Pike

== Players ==
=== Statistics ===
Key:
‡ On loan from another club * First appearance(s) for the club

- # = Squad number
- Pos = Playing position
- P = Number of games played
- G = Number of goals scored
- GK = Goalkeeper
- DF = Defender
- MF = Midfielder
- FW = Forward
- = Yellow cards
- = Red cards
- † Permanent player left club during the season
- ¤ Loaned to another club for part or all of season

Correct as of the season's end. Starting appearances are listed first, followed by substitute appearances in parentheses where applicable.

No.	Pos	Name	P	G	P	G	P	G	P	G	A yellow card	A red card	Notes
No.	Pos	Name	League		FA Cup		League Cup		Total		Discipline		Notes
1	GK	(England) Mike Stowell	18	0	0	0	2	0	20	0	0	0	
2	DF	(Australia) Kevin Muscat	45	4	2	0	2	0	49	4	8	1	
3	DF	(England) Darren Bazeley	46	3	3	0	2	0	51	3	3	0	
4	MF	(Wales) Carl Robinson	21(12)	3	3	1	2	0	26(12)	4	5	0	
5	DF	(England) Keith Curle (c)	44(1)	2	2	0	2	1	48(1)	3	6	0	
6	MF	(England) Neil Emblen	45(1)	5	3	0	2	1	50(1)	6	0	0	
7	MF	(England) Paul Simpson	1(12)	0	0(2)	0	0(1)	0	1(15)	0	0	0	
8	MF	(England) Simon Osborn	22(3)	0	0(1)	0	0	0	22(4)	0	7	1	
9	FW	(Norway) Håvard Flo	9(10)	4	0(2)	0	2	0	11(12)	4	1	0	
10	FW	(Republic of Ireland) Robbie Keane †	2	2	0	0	0(1)	0	2(1)	2	0	0	
10	FW	(Nigeria) Ade Akinbiyi	36(1)	16	3	0	0	0	39(1)	16	4	1	
11	MF	(England) Andy Sinton	31(4)	0	3	0	2	0	36(4)	0	1	0	
12	DF	(England) Lee Naylor	24(6)	2	3	0	2	0	29(6)	2	4	0	
13	GK	(England) Matt Murray	0	0	0	0	0	0	0	0	0	0	
14	MF	(Australia) Steve Corica †	10(5)	1	1(1)	0	2	0	13(6)	1	0	0	
14	MF	(Denmark) Allan Nielsen ‡	7	2	0	0	0	0	7	2	0	0	
15	MF	(England) Steve Sedgley	32(6)	5	2	1	0	0	34(6)	6	3	0	
16	MF	(Germany) Robert Niestroj ¤	0(1)	0	0	0	0	0	0(1)	0	0	0	
17	FW	(England) Mark Jones ¤	0(1)	0	0	0	0	0	0(1)	0	0	0	
18	DF	(Wales) Ryan Green	0	0	0	0	0	0	0	0	0	0	
19	DF	(Wales) Ady Williams ¤	0(1)	0	0	0	0	0	0(1)	0	0	0	
20	GK	(Australia) Steve Mautone †	0	0	0	0	0	0	0	0	0	0	
20	FW	(England) Michael Branch ‡	25(2)	6	2	0	0	0	27(2)	6	1	0	
21	MF	(Republic of Ireland) Keith Andrews	0(2)	0	0	0	0	0	0(2)	0	0	0	
22	FW	(Republic of Ireland) Colin Larkin	1	0	0	0	0(1)	1	1(1)	1	0	0	
23	DF	(France) Ludovic Pollet ‡	38(1)	5	3	0	0	0	41(1)	5	5	1	
24	MF	(England) Scott Taylor	18(10)	3	0	0	0	0	18(10)	3	4	0	
25	DF	(Northern Ireland) Gordon Simms	0	0	0	0	0	0	0	0	0	0	
26	FW	(Nigeria) George Ndah	3(1)	0	0	0	0	0	3(1)	0	0	0	
27	GK	(England) Michael Oakes	28	0	3	0	0	0	31	0	0	0	
28	MF	(England) Shane Tudor	0	0	0	0	0	0	0	0	0	0	
29	DF	(England) Joleon Lescott	0	0	0	0	0	0	0	0	0	0	
30	GK	(Australia) Andy Petterson ‡	0	0	0	0	0	0	0	0	0	0	
31	FW	(England) Adam Proudlock	0	0	0	0	0	0	0	0	0	0	

=== Awards ===
Award	Winner
Fans' Player of the Season	Ludovic Pollet
Young Player of the Season	Joleon Lescott

== Transfers ==
=== In ===
Date	Player	From	Fee
6 July 1999	(England) Darren Bazeley	Unattached	Free
6 July 1999	(England) Andy Sinton	Unattached	Free
5 August 1999	(Australia) Steve Mautone	Unattached	Free
7 September 1999	(Nigeria) Ade Akinbiyi	Bristol City	£3.5 million
9 October 1999	(England) Scott Taylor	Unattached	Free
21 October 1999	(Nigeria) George Ndah	Swindon Town	£1 million
22 October 1999	(France) Ludovic Pollet	(France) Lens	£350,000
29 October 1999	(England) Michael Oakes	Aston Villa	£500,000
20 January 2000	(England) Michael Branch	Everton	£500,000

=== Out ===
Date	Player	To	Fee
June 1999	(England) Mark Atkins	Released	Free
June 1999	(England) Justin Bray	Released	Free
June 1999	(Scotland) Darren Ferguson	Released	Free
June 1999	(Republic of Ireland) Dominic Foley	Released	Free
June 1999	(Barbados) Michael Gilkes	Released	Free
June 1999	(Spain) Fernando Gómez	Released	Free
June 1999	(England) Darren Middleton	Released	Free
June 1999	(England) Dean Richards	Released	Free
June 1999	(Republic of Ireland) Andy Turner	Released	Free
13 July 1999	(England) Steve Bull	Retired	–
18 August 1999	(Republic of Ireland) Robbie Keane	Coventry City	£6 million
5 November 1999	(Australia) Steve Mautone	Released	Free
14 March 2000	(Australia) Steve Corica	(Japan) Sanfrecce Hiroshima	£150,000

=== Loans in ===
Start date	Player	From	End date
15 September 1999	(France) Ludovic Pollet	(France) Lens	22 October 1999
25 November 1999	(England) Michael Branch	Everton	20 January 2000
14 February 2000	(Australia) Andy Petterson	Portsmouth	End of season
23 March 2000	(Denmark) Allan Nielsen	Tottenham Hotspur	End of season

=== Loans out ===
Start date	Player	To	End date
4 October 1999	(England) Mark Jones	Cheltenham Town	4 November 1999
6 December 1999	(Germany) Robert Niestroj	(Germany) 1. FC Nürnberg	End of season
16 February 2000	(Wales) Ady Williams	Reading	16 March 2000
22 March 2000	(Wales) Ady Williams	Reading	End of season

== Kit ==
The season retained the club's home kit from the previous season, but brought a new away kit that was again a white shirt but with a change to a black collar. Both were manufactured by Puma and sponsored by Goodyear.
