= List of Cambridge United F.C. seasons =

This is a list of all seasons played by Cambridge United in English football since the 1970–71 season, when the club were elected to the Football League. It details their record in every major competition entered, as well as the top goalscorers for each season.

The club currently play in League Two, having been relegated from League One in 2024/25 where they had competed since 2021. The club has spent the following number of seasons at each level of the English football league system since its initial election:

- Seasons at level 2: 8
- Seasons at level 3: 11
- Seasons at level 4: 22
- Seasons at level 5: 9

The club's highest position ever is 5th in the Second Division in 1991–92, the last season before the establishment of the Premier League, a playoff position. They lost the semi-final to Leicester City 6–1 on aggregate and lost their chance to become founder members of the Premier League. Their lowest position has been 17th in the Football Conference (now National League) in 2006–07 and 2010–11.

== Key ==
Key to divisions

- Division 1 – Football League First Division
- Division 2 – Football League Second Division
- Division 3 – Football League Third Division
- Division 4 – Football League Fourth Division
- League 2 – Football League Two
- Conference – Football Conference

Key to rounds

- PR – Preliminary round
- QR4 – Fourth qualifying round
- Group – Group stage
- R1 – First round, etc.
- QF – Quarter-finals
- SF – Semi-finals
- RU – Runner-up
- W – Winner

Key to positions and symbols

- 1st – Champions
- 2nd – Runners-up
- ↑ – Promoted
- ↓ – Relegated
- N/A – Competition not eligible to enter
- — – Cambridge United did not enter the competition

== Seasons ==
Season	League record									FA Cup	EFL Cup	EFL (Note: The EFL Trophy was called the Associate Members' Cup from 1983 to 1992 and the Football League Trophy from 1992 to 2016.) Trophy	Other		Top goalscorer(s) (Note: Includes goals scored in the Football League, Football Conference, FA Cup, EFL Cup, EFL Trophy, FA Trophy, and Conference League Cup.)	
Season	Division	P	W	D	L	F	A	Pts	Pos	FA Cup	EFL Cup	EFL Trophy	Competition	Result	Name	Goals
1970–71	Division 4	46	15	13	18	51	67	43	20th	R2	R1	—N/a	—	—	Ivan Hollett	12
1971–72	Division 4	46	17	14	15	62	60	48	10th	R2	R1	—N/a	—	—	Brian Greenhalgh	19
1972–73	Division 4 ↑	46	20	17	9	67	57	57	3rd	R1	R1	—N/a	—	—	Brian Greenhalgh	18
1973–74	Division 3 ↓	46	13	9	24	48	81	35	21st	R3	R2	—N/a	—	—	Brian Greenhalgh	11
1974–75	Division 4	46	20	14	12	62	44	54	6th	R3	R1	—N/a	—	—	Bobby Shinton	16
1975–76	Division 4	46	14	15	17	58	62	43	13th	R1	R1	—N/a	—	—	Tommy Horsfall	15
1976–77	Division 4 ↑	46	26	13	7	87	40	65	1st	R1	R2	—N/a	—	—	Alan Biley	20
1977–78	Division 3 ↑	46	23	12	11	72	51	58	2nd	R2	R1	—N/a	—	—	Alan Biley	23
1978–79	Division 2	42	12	16	14	44	52	40	12th	R3	R1	—N/a	—	—	Alan Biley	22
1979–80	Division 2	42	14	16	12	61	53	44	8th	R4	R2	—N/a	Anglo-Scottish Cup	Group	Tommy Finney	13
1980–81	Division 2	46	17	6	19	53	65	40	13th	R3	R4	—N/a	—	—	George Reilly; Steve Spriggs	10
1981–82	Division 2	46	13	9	20	48	53	48	14th	R3	R2	—N/a	—	—	Joe Mayo; George Reilly	8
1982–83	Division 2	42	13	12	17	42	60	51	12th	R5	R2	—N/a	—	—	George Reilly	11
1983–84	Division 2 ↓	42	4	12	26	28	77	24	22nd	R3	R2	—	—	—	Robbie Cooke	8
1984–85	Division 3 ↓	46	4	9	23	37	95	21	24th	R1	R1	R2	—	—	Robbie Cooke	7
1985–86	Division 4	46	15	9	22	65	80	54	22nd	R1	R1	QF	—	—	David Crown	27
1986–87	Division 4	46	17	11	18	60	62	62	11th	R2	R4	PR	—	—	Mark Cooper; David Crown	16
1987–88	Division 4	46	16	13	17	50	52	61	15th	R2	R1	PR	—	—	David Crown	12
1988–89	Division 4	46	18	14	14	71	62	68	8th	R3	R1	R1	—	—	Laurie Ryan	13
1989–90	Division 4 ↑	46	21	10	15	76	66	73	6th (Note: Promoted to Football League Third Division via the play-offs, beating Maidstone United 3–1 on aggregate in the semi-final and Chesterfield 1–0 in the 1990 Football League Fourth Division play-off final.)	QF	R2	PR	—	—	Dion Dublin; John Taylor	21
1990–91	Division 3 ↑	46	25	11	10	75	45	86	1st	QF	R1	SF	—	—	Dion Dublin	21
1991–92	Division 2	46	19	17	10	65	47	74	5th (Note: Lost in the play-off semi-final to Leicester City 6–1 on aggregate.)	R4	R2	—	Full Members' Cup	R2	Dion Dublin	19
1992–93	Division 1 (Note: The Second Division was renamed Division One after the teams in the First Division broke away from The Football League to form the FA Premier League.) ↓	46	11	16	19	58	69	49	23rd	R3	QF	—	Anglo-Italian Cup	Group	Steve Claridge	7
1993–94	Division 2	46	19	9	18	79	73	66	10th	R2	R2	R2	—	—	Steve Butler	21
1994–95	Division 2 ↓	46	11	15	20	52	69	48	20th	R3	R1	R2	—	—	Carlo Corazzin	19
1995–96	Division 3	46	14	12	20	61	71	54	16th	R1	R1	PR	—	—	Carlo Corazzin	12
1996–97	Division 3	46	18	11	17	53	59	65	10th	R2	R1	R1	—	—	Carlo Corazzin	8
1997–98	Division 3	46	14	18	14	63	57	60	16th	R2	R1	R1	—	—	Martin Butler	13
1998–99	Division 3 ↑	46	23	12	11	78	48	81	2nd	R2	R3	SF	—	—	Martin Butler	20
1999–2000	Division 2	46	12	12	22	64	65	48	19th	R5	R1	R1	—	—	Trevor Benjamin	23
2000–01	Division 2	46	14	11	21	61	77	53	19th	R2	R1	R2	—	—	Tom Youngs	15
2001–02	Division 2 ↓	46	7	13	26	47	93	34	24th	R1	R1	RU	—	—	Tom Youngs	11
2002–03	Division 3	46	16	13	17	67	70	61	12th	R3	R2	SF	—	—	Dave Kitson	25
2003–04	Division 3	46	14	14	18	55	67	56	13th	R2	R1	R1	—	—	Luke Guttridge	12
2004–05	League 2 ↓	46	8	16	22	39	62	30 (Note: Cambridge United were deducted 10 points for entering administration.)	24th	R2	R1	R2	—	—	Jermaine Easter; Shane Tudor	7
2005–06	Conference	42	15	10	17	51	57	55	12th	QR4	—N/a	QF	FA Trophy	R1	Fola Onibuje	11
2006–07	Conference	46	15	10	21	57	66	55	17th	QR4	—N/a	—N/a	FA Trophy	R1	Robbie Simpson	17
2007–08	Conference	46	25	11	10	68	41	86	2nd (Note: Beat Burton Albion 4–3 on aggregate in the semi-final before losing 1–0 to Exeter City in the 2008 Conference Premier play-off final.)	R3	—N/a	—N/a	FA Trophy Conference League Cup	R2 R4	Scott Rendell	19
2008–09	Conference	46	24	14	8	65	39	86	2nd (Note: Beat Stevenage Borough 4–3 on aggregate in the semi-final before losing 2–0 to Torquay United in the 2009 Conference Premier play-off final.)	R1	—N/a	—N/a	FA Trophy Conference League Cup	R2 R3	Scott Rendell	13
2009–10	Conference	44	15	14	15	65	53	59	10th	R2	—N/a	—N/a	FA Trophy	R3	Danny Crow	19
2010–11	Conference	46	11	17	18	53	61	50	17th	R1	—N/a	—N/a	FA Trophy	R2	Daniel Wright	12
2011–12	Conference	46	19	14	13	57	41	71	9th	R1	—N/a	—N/a	FA Trophy	R4	Luke Berry	9
2012–13	Conference	46	15	14	17	68	69	59	14th	QR4	—N/a	—N/a	FA Trophy	R2	Tom Elliott	15
2013–14	Conference ↑	46	23	13	10	72	35	82	2nd (Note: Promoted to Football League Two via the play-offs, beating FC Halifax Town 2–1 on aggregate in the semi-final and Gateshead 2–1 in the 2014 Conference Premier play-off final.)	R2	—N/a	—N/a	FA Trophy	W	Luke Berry	14
2014–15	League 2	46	13	12	21	61	66	51	19th	R4	R1	R1	—	—	Robbie Simpson	9
2015–16	League 2	46	18	14	14	66	55	68	9th	R2	R1	R1	—	—	Luke Berry	12
2016–17	League 2	46	19	9	18	58	50	66	11th	R3	R2	R2	—	—	Luke Berry	22
2017–18	League 2	46	17	13	16	56	60	64	12th	R2	R1	Group	—	—	Uche Ikpeazu	13
2018–19	League 2	46	12	11	23	40	66	47	21st	R1	R1	R2	—	—	Jevani Brown	8
2019–20	League 2	37	12	9	16	40	48	45	16th (Note: The 2019–20 EFL League Two was curtailed due to the COVID-19 pandemic, with league positions, promotions and relegations decided on a points-per-game basis.)	R1	R2	Group	—	—	Harvey Knibbs; Sam Smith	8
2020–21	League 2 ↑	46	24	8	14	73	49	80	2nd	R1	R2	R3	—	—	Paul Mullin	34
2021–22	League 1	46	15	13	18	56	74	58	14th	R4	R2	QF	—	—	Sam Smith	21
2022–23	League 1	46	13	7	26	41	68	46	20th	R2	R2	Group	—	—	Sam Smith	14
2023–24	League 1	46	12	12	22	39	61	48	18th	R3	R1	Group	—	—	Gassan Ahadme	13
2024–25	League 1 ↓	46	9	11	26	45	73	38	23rd	R2	R1	R2	—	—	Josh Stokes; Elias Kachunga	7

== See also ==
- History of Cambridge United F.C.
