= Hoilett =

Hoilett is a surname. Notable people with the surname include:

- Abali Hoilett (born 1983), Caymanian cricketer
- Junior Hoilett (born 1990), Canadian soccer player

== See also ==
- Rupert Hoilette
- Howlett
