= Naisbitt =

Naisbitt is a surname. Notable people with the surname include:

- Carol Naisbitt (1922–1974), victim of the 1974 Hi-Fi murders
- Danny Naisbitt (born 1978), English footballer
- John Naisbitt (1929–2021), American author and public speaker in the area of futures studies
