= Shane Tudor =

English footballer

Personal information
- Full name: Shane Anthony Tudor
- Date of birth: 10 February 1982 (age 44)
- Place of birth: Wolverhampton, England
- Height: 1.73 m (5 ft 8 in)
- Position: Winger

Youth career
- 1998–1999: Wolverhampton Wanderers

Senior career*
Years	Team	Apps	(Gls)
1999–2001	Wolverhampton Wanderers	1	(0)
2001–2005	Cambridge United	121	(21)
2005–2007	Leyton Orient	66	(6)
2007–2009	Port Vale	19	(0)
2007	→ Shrewsbury Town (loan)	0	(0)
Total		207	(27)
- * Club domestic league appearances and goals

Shane Anthony Tudor (born 10 February 1982) is an English former footballer. He played as a midfielder, primarily in the right-wing position. He scored 34 goals in 246 appearances throughout a ten-year career in the Football League.

He began his career at Wolverhampton Wanderers before moving to Cambridge United in November 2001. He played for the club in the Football League Trophy final in 2002, but severe financial difficulties caused the club to drop from the Second Division into the Conference National. He signed with Leyton Orient in May 2005 and helped the club win promotion out of League Two in 2005–06. Moving on to Port Vale in May 2007, injuries began to disrupt his career, leaving him unable to play for Shrewsbury Town despite him joining the club on loan. He retired from football in January 2009, at 26, after a knee injury ended his professional career.

== Career ==
Tudor began his career at hometown club Wolverhampton Wanderers, coming through the youth ranks before signing professional forms for the 1999–2000 season. He made his First Division debut on 23 December 2000, replacing Darren Bazeley 82 minutes into a 1–0 win over Sheffield Wednesday at Hillsborough. However, he did not feature in new manager Dave Jones's first-team plans, and so was allowed to join John Taylor's Cambridge United on a free transfer in November 2001.

He scored his first senior goal at the Abbey Stadium in the FA Cup on 17 November 2001, in a 1–1 draw with Notts County. He scored four goals in 36 appearances in the 2001–02 season; however, Cambridge were relegated after finishing bottom of the Second Division; they failed to record an away win all season. Despite this record, they managed to reach the final of the Football League Trophy at the Millennium Stadium, where they lost 4–1 to Blackpool; Tudor started the final but was replaced by Danny Jackman after 60 minutes.

In November 2002, he signed a contract with the club, which kept him with Cambridge until the summer of 2005. He scored ten goals in 34 games in 2002–03, as Cambridge posted a 12th-place finish in the Third Division. He played 40 games in 2003–04, scoring three goals, as United dropped to 13th. Tudor scored seven goals in 28 games in 2004–05 to become the club's joint top-scorer (with Jermaine Easter). It was a disappointing end to his Cambridge career, though, as the club entered administration and was relegated to the Conference National after finishing bottom of the Football League.

Tudor was unwilling to play non-League football and started looking for another club. He quickly signed for Leyton Orient on a two-year deal. Despite undergoing groin surgery in December, and also suffering ankle problems towards the end of the season, he scored five goals in 29 games from his right-wing position to help the club to promotion from League Two. His ankle injury later needed surgery. The operation was a success and saw him enjoy a return to form. His second season in the capital saw Orient retain their League One status with Tudor the main fixture on the right-wing, playing 36 times and scoring twice. At the end of the 2006–07 campaign, he was released, after he informed "O's" boss Martin Ling that he would not be signing a new contract as he wanted to move back to his Midlands roots.

In May 2007, he signed a two-year contract for fellow League One side Port Vale. He struggled to maintain his place in the side, only making 14 league appearances in his first season, as well as being sent out on loan to Shrewsbury Town, where he failed to make any appearances at all due to a hamstring injury. This was a disappointment for Tudor as he had hoped to make the move permanent, and he told the Shropshire Star "I'll be back". He caused controversy on 20 September 2008, when after a 4–1 defeat to Macclesfield Town at Vale Park he was quoting as saying "No disrespect to them [Macclesfield], but they're a shit club. Look at the size of us to them and it's a million miles away." He later apologised to the club, saying that he had been "disappointed and angry" to have been limited to a late cameo appearance in the game, though stood by his belief that Port Vale were a bigger club than Macclesfield. It was against Shrewsbury Town at the New Meadow on 11 October 2008, where Tudor sustained a knee injury. He underwent surgery which proved unsuccessful, and he retired from professional football in January 2009, aged just 26. He stated his ambition to go into management and said "It would be nice to come back and manage Port Vale one day."

== Post-retirement ==
After being forced to retire from football, he graduated with a degree in sports journalist from Staffordshire University in 2011, and two years later founded the Sporting Stars Academy in Stoke-on-Trent with former teammate Robin Hulbert.

== Career statistics ==
Appearances and goals by club, season and competition
Club	Season	League			FA Cup		League Cup		Other		Total	
Club	Season	Division	Apps	Goals	Apps	Goals	Apps	Goals	Apps	Goals	Apps	Goals
Wolverhampton Wanderers	1999–2000	First Division	0	0	0	0	0	0	—		0	0
Wolverhampton Wanderers	2000–01	First Division	1	0	0	0	0	0	—		1	0
Wolverhampton Wanderers	2001–02	First Division	0	0	0	0	0	0	—		0	0
Wolverhampton Wanderers	Total		1	0	0	0	0	0	0	0	1	0
Cambridge United	2001–02	Second Division	32	3	2	1	0	0	6 (Note: Appearance/(s) in the EFL Trophy.)	1	40	5
Cambridge United	2002–03	Third Division	27	9	5	0	2	1	4	1	38	11
Cambridge United	2003–04	Third Division	36	3	3	0	1	0	1	0	41	3
Cambridge United	2004–05	League Two	26	6	1	1	0	1	1	0	28	8
Cambridge United	Total		121	21	11	2	3	2	12	2	147	27
Leyton Orient	2005–06	League Two	33	4	5	1	1	0	0	0	39	5
Leyton Orient	2006–07	League One	33	2	2	0	1	0	0	0	36	2
Leyton Orient	Total		66	6	7	1	2	1	0	0	75	8
Port Vale	2007–08	League One	14	0	1	0	1	0	1	0	17	0
Port Vale	2008–09	League Two	5	0	0	0	1	0	0	0	6	0
Port Vale	Total		19	0	1	0	2	0	1	0	23	0
Shrewsbury Town (loan)	2007–08	League Two	0	0	—		—		—		0	0
Career total			207	27	19	3	7	2	13	2	246	34

== Honours ==
Cambridge United

- Football League Trophy runner-up: 2001–02

Leyton Orient

- Football League Two third-place promotion: 2005–06
