= Simon Russell (footballer) =

English footballer

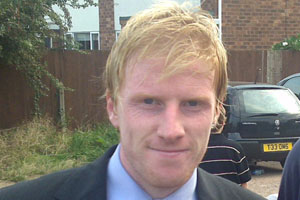
- Russell in 2009

Personal information
- Full name: Simon Craig Russell
- Date of birth: 19 March 1985 (age 41)
- Place of birth: Hull, England
- Height: 5 ft 7 in (1.70 m)
- Position: Midfielder

Youth career
- –2002: Hull City

Senior career*
Years	Team	Apps	(Gls)
2002–2004	Hull City	1	(0)
2004–2008	Kidderminster Harriers	134	(14)
2008–2010	York City	24	(0)
2009	→ Tamworth (loan)	11	(0)
2010	→ Cambridge United (loan)	15	(0)
2010–2011	Cambridge United	31	(6)
2011–2012	Lincoln City	26	(1)
2012–2013	Alfreton Town	15	(0)
2013–2016	Gainsborough Trinity	125	(26)
2016–2018	North Ferriby United	20	(1)
2018–2020	Gainsborough Trinity	1	(0)
2020–2022	Tadcaster Albion	30	(4)
Total		433	(52)
- * Club domestic league appearances and goals

Simon Craig Russell (born 19 March 1985) is an English former professional footballer who played as a midfielder.

He previously played in the Football League for Hull City and Kidderminster Harriers before moving into Non-League with York City, Tamworth, Cambridge United, Lincoln City, Alfreton Town and North Ferriby United and Gainsborough Trinity.

== Career ==
Born in Hull, East Riding of Yorkshire, Russell began his career as a trainee at Hull City. He made his first-team debut after coming on as a 60th minute substitute in a Football League Trophy match against Port Vale on 22 October 2002, which was lost 3–1. He made his league debut in the Third Division in a 4–1 victory against Kidderminster Harriers on 26 April 2003. He made no appearances for Hull's first team during the 2003–04 season, but helped the reserve team win the East Riding Senior Cup after scoring in the final, which finished 3–0. He was released by Hull in the summer of 2004 after making two substitute appearances for the club, and was signed by League Two club Kidderminster in July 2004 on a two-year contract, whose manager Jan Mølby described him as, "... [having] a tremendous engine and is likely to pop up with a goal or two."

He finished his first season aft Kidderminster with 29 appearances and 2 goals as they were relegated to the Conference National. He received a broken wrist in November 2005 that ruled him out for three months of 2005–06, but made his return after two months when he featured as a 63rd-minute substitute against Altrincham on 2 January 2006. He finished the season with 35 appearances and 2 goals. After making 52 appearances and scoring 6 goals in 2006–07, he signed a new one-year contract with the club, which saw him become their longest serving current player. He picked up a thigh injury that ruled him out of the beginning of 2007–08 and returned to action in a 3–1 victory against Droylsden on 18 September 2007. He finished the season with 36 appearances and 6 goals.

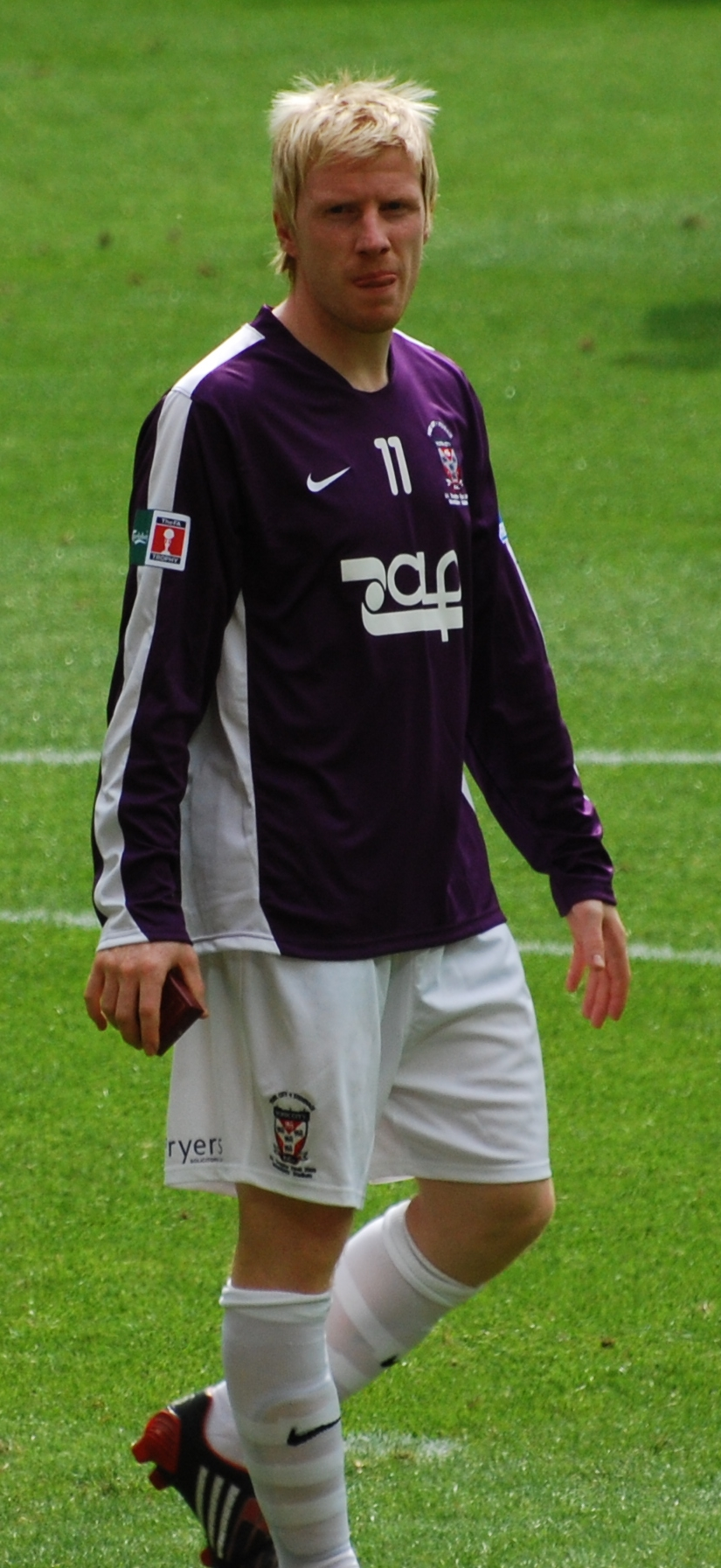
Russell after playing for York City in the 2009 FA Trophy Final

Having made three appearances for Kidderminster up to that point in 2008–09, Russell signed for fellow Conference Premier club York City on a free transfer on 22 August 2008. He made his debut a day later as a 54th-minute substitute in a 2–2 draw against Northwich Victoria. He suffered from a tight hamstring during York's match against Grays Athletic in December, which resulted in him missing the Histon match. He scored his first goal for York directly from a corner kick in a 3–1 defeat to Barrow in the Conference League Cup on 20 January 2009. He came on as a substitute in the 2009 FA Trophy Final at Wembley Stadium on 9 May 2009, which York lost 2–0 to Stevenage Borough. Russell turned down loan moves to two Conference North clubs in September 2009, as he wanted to stay and fight for his place at York.

He joined York's Conference Premier rivals Tamworth on 17 September 2009 on a one-month loan, after failing to play any matches for York up to that point in 2009–10. The loan was extended until 1 January 2010 in October. He returned to York on 19 December 2009 and joined Cambridge United on loan until the end of 2009–10 on 22 January 2010. He made his debut in a 1–0 defeat to Crawley Town on 6 February 2010. He returned to York at the end of the season after making 17 appearances on loan at Cambridge, and manager Martin Ling said Russell would be offered a permanent contract by the club if he was to be released by York. He re-signed for Cambridge permanently on a two-year contract on 10 May. Russell started 2010–11 in fine form for Cambridge, scoring his first goal in the 2–2 home draw against Crawley on 17 August and adding four more to lead the club's goalscoring charts in November.

Russell signed for newly relegated Conference Premier club Lincoln City on 20 July 2011 on a one-year contract after he was made available by Cambridge. He finished 2011–12 with 30 appearances and 1 goal for Lincoln before signing for Alfreton Town on a one-year contract on 13 July 2012. He signed for Conference North club Gainsborough Trinity on a free transfer on 10 January 2013.

Russell signed for newly promoted National League club North Ferriby United on 14 June 2016. In January 2018 Russell re-joined Gainsborough Trinity.

Russell signed for Tadcaster Albion ahead of the 2020–21 season. In June 2022, Russell announced his retirement.

== Career statistics ==
As of match played 29 April 2017

Appearances and goals by club, season and competition
Club	Season	League			FA Cup		League Cup		Other		Total	
Club	Season	Division	Apps	Goals	Apps	Goals	Apps	Goals	Apps	Goals	Apps	Goals
Hull City	2002–03	Third Division	1	0	0	0	0	0	1 (Note: Appearance in Football League Trophy)	0	2	0
Hull City	2003–04	Third Division	0	0	0	0	0	0	0	0	0	0
Hull City	Total		1	0	0	0	0	0	1	0	2	0
Kidderminster Harriers	2004–05	League Two	28	2	1	0	0	0	0	0	29	2
Kidderminster Harriers	2005–06	Conference National	31	2	1	0	—		3 (Note: Two appearances in Football League Trophy, one in FA Trophy)	0	35	2
Kidderminster Harriers	2006–07	Conference National	42	4	1	0	—		9 (Note: Appearance(s) in FA Trophy)	2	52	6
Kidderminster Harriers	2007–08	Conference Premier	30	6	1	0	—		5 (Note: Three appearances in FA Trophy, two appearances and one goal in Conference League Cup)	1	36	7
Kidderminster Harriers	2008–09	Conference Premier	3	0	—		—		—		3	0
Kidderminster Harriers	Total		134	14	4	0	—		17	3	155	17
York City	2008–09	Conference Premier	24	0	2	0	—		7 (Note: Two appearances and one goal in Conference League Cup, five appearances in FA Trophy)	1	33	1
York City	2009–10	Conference Premier	0	0	—		—		—		0	0
York City	Total		24	0	2	0	—		7	1	33	1
Tamworth (loan)	2009–10	Conference Premier	11	0	1	0	—		—		12	0
Cambridge United (loan)	2009–10	Conference Premier	15	0	—		—		2	0	17	0
Cambridge United	2010–11	Conference Premier	31	6	3	1	—		3	1	37	8
Cambridge United	Total		46	6	3	1	—		5	1	54	8
Lincoln City	2011–12	Conference Premier	26	1	1	0	—		3	0	30	1
Alfreton Town	2012–13	Conference Premier	15	0	0	0	—		0	0	15	0
Gainsborough Trinity	2012–13	Conference North	15	4	—		—		4	1	19	5
Gainsborough Trinity	2013–14	Conference North	40	10	1	0	—		1	0	42	10
Gainsborough Trinity	2014–15	Conference North	35	7	2	0	—		0	0	37	7
Gainsborough Trinity	2015–16	National League North	35	5	4	0	—		2	0	41	5
Gainsborough Trinity	Total		125	26	7	0	—		7	1	139	27
North Ferriby United	2016–17	National League	20	1	1	0	—		0	0	21	1
Career total			402	48	19	1	0	0	40	6	461	55
