= 1991–92 Cambridge United F.C. season =

Cambridge United
1991–92 season
- Manager: John Beck
- Stadium: Abbey Stadium
- Second Division: 5th (qualified for play-offs)
- Play-offs: Semi-finals
- FA Cup: Fourth round
- League Cup: Second round
- Top goalscorer: League: Dion Dublin (15); All: Dion Dublin (19)

During the 1991–92 English football season, Cambridge United competed in the Football League Second Division.

== Season summary ==
Cambridge had returned to English football's second tier after an absence of seven seasons, following two successive promotions. Few expected Cambridge to succeed at a high level after their rapid rise, five years after having to reapply for Football League status, but Cambridge managed to make the play-offs for promotion to the inaugural Premier League season with a fifth-place finish - their highest-ever placing in the Football League. Cambridge lost in the semi-finals to Leicester City - following a 1–1 draw at home in the first leg, they were hammered 5–0 at Filbert Street for a 6–1 aggregate loss - but even this cruel end to their promotion hopes did little to detract from what Cambridge had achieved in such a short period of time.

Crucial to Cambridge's success was free-scoring striker Dion Dublin; but in the off-season he left to join First Division runners-up Manchester United in a £1 million transfer, spreading doubt that Cambridge would be capable of improving and clinching promotion the next season.

== Kit ==
Influence became Cambridge's new kit manufacturers, and introduced a new home kit for the season. The kit saw a return to tradition for Cambridge, with the club returning to its tradition dark orange shirts and black shorts, with black socks also worn. Fujitsu retained their sponsorship for away kits and, following the end of Cambridge's sponsorship deal with Howlett, became the home sponsors too.

== First-team squad ==
Note: Flags indicate national team as defined under FIFA eligibility rules; some limited exceptions apply. Players may hold more than one non-FIFA nationality.

Pos.	Nation	Player
GK	ENG	Jon Sheffield
GK	ENG	John Vaughan
DF	ENG	Phil Chapple
DF	ENG	Andy Fensome
DF	ENG	Mick Heathcote
DF	ENG	Alan Kimble
DF	ENG	Gary Rowett
DF	IRL	Liam Daish
MF	ENG	Colin Bailie

Pos.	Nation	Player
MF	ENG	Michael Cheetham
MF	ENG	Danny O'Shea
MF	ENG	Dave Penney
MF	ENG	Lee Philpott
MF	ENG	Richard Wilkins
FW	ENG	Steve Claridge
FW	ENG	Dion Dublin
FW	ENG	Devon White

=== Left club during season ===
Note: Flags indicate national team as defined under FIFA eligibility rules; some limited exceptions apply. Players may hold more than one non-FIFA nationality.

Pos. / Nation / Player; FW / ENG / John Taylor (to Bristol Rovers)	Pos. / Nation / Player; FW / WAL / Lee Nogan (to Watford)

== Transfers ==
=== In ===
- (England) Devon White - (England) Bristol Rovers, exchange, March 1992

=== Out ===
- (England) John Taylor - (England) Bristol Rovers, £90,000, March 1992

== Results ==
=== Second Division ===
==== League table ====
Pos	Team	Pld	W	D	L	GF	GA	GD	Pts	Qualification or relegation
3	Derby County	46	23	9	14	69	51	+18	78	Qualification for the Second Division play-offs
4	Leicester City	46	23	8	15	62	55	+7	77	Qualification for the Second Division play-offs
5	Cambridge United	46	19	17	10	65	47	+18	74	Qualification for the Second Division play-offs
6	Blackburn Rovers (O, P)	46	21	11	14	70	53	+17	74	Qualification for the Second Division play-offs
7	Charlton Athletic	46	20	11	15	54	48	+6	71	Qualification for the First Division (Note: From the 1992–93 season, the first tier became the Premier League, the second tier - then known as the Second Division - was renamed to the First Division, and the third tier - then known as the Third Division - was renamed to the Second Division.)

Rules for classification: 1) Points; 2) Goal difference; 3) Goals scored
(O) Play-off winners; (P) Promoted

==== Results ====
- 17 August: Port Vale 2–1 Oxford United (Foyle x2; ?) attendance 6,984

7 September 1991 5	Wolverhampton Wanderers	3–1	Oxford United	Wolverhampton
15:00 BST	Dennison 3'; Bull 8'; Steele 43'		Nogan 80'	Stadium: Molineux; Attendance: 12,549

- 5 October: Ipswich Town 2–1 Oxford United (Milton, Whitton; ?) attendance 9,922

19 October 1991 13	Newcastle United	4 - 3	Oxford United	Newcastle upon Tyne
15:00 BST		[ Report]		Stadium: St James' Park; Attendance: 16,454

- 26 October: Oxford United 1–2 Leicester United (?; Wright, Thompson) attendance 5,206
- 9 November: Portsmouth 2–1 Oxford United
- 18 January: Oxford United 2–2 Port Vale (?; Houchen, Swan) attendance 4,199
- 8 February: Leicester City 2–1 Oxford United (Kitson, Wright; ?) attendance 12,128
- 21 March: Oxford United 2–1 Portsmouth

4 April 1992 39	Oxford United	1–0	Wolverhampton Wanderers	Oxford
15:00 BST	Penney 87'			Stadium: Manor Ground; Attendance: 7,165

- 25 April: Oxford United 1–1 Ipswich Town (?; Johnson) attendance 10,525
- Derby County 2–2 Oxford United
- Oxford United 2–0 Derby County

==== Play-Offs ====
10 May 1992 SF (1)	Cambridge United F.C.	1–1	Leicester City F.C.	Cambridge
15:00 BST			Russell	Stadium: Abbey Stadium; Attendance: 9,225

13 May 1992 SF (2)	Leicester City F.C.	5–0 (6-1 agg.)	Cambridge United F.C.	Leicester
19:45 BST			Wright (2), Thompson, Russell, Ormondroyd	Stadium: Filbert Street; Attendance: 21,024

=== FA Cup ===
4 January 1992 Rd 3	Coventry City F.C.	1–1	Cambridge United F.C.	Coventry
15:00 BST	Borrows (Pen)			Stadium: Highfield Road; Attendance: 11,428

14 January 1992 Rd 3 (R)	Cambridge United F.C.	1–0	Coventry City F.C.	Cambridge
19:45 BST				Stadium: Abbey Stadium; Attendance: 9,864

25 January 1992 Rd 4	Cambridge United F.C.	0–3	Swindon Town F.C.	Cambridge
15:00 BST			Shearer (2), Calderwood	Stadium: Abbey Stadium; Attendance: 7,428

=== League Cup ===
21 August 1991 Rd 1 (1)	Cambridge United F.C.	1–0	Reading F.C.	Cambridge
19:45 BST				Stadium: Abbey Stadium

28 August 1991 Rd 1 (2)	Reading F.C.	0–3 (0-4 agg.)	Cambridge United F.C.	Reading
19:45 BST				Stadium: Elm Park

25 September 1991 Rd 2 (1)	Manchester United F.C.	3–0	Cambridge United F.C.	Manchester
19:45 BST	Giggs 44', McClair 48', Bruce 66'			Stadium: Old Trafford; Attendance: 30,934

9 October 1991 Rd 2 (2)	Cambridge United F.C.	1–1 (1-4 agg.)	Manchester United F.C.	Cambridge
19:45 BST			McClair 2'	Stadium: Abbey Stadium; Attendance: 9,248
