= Brian Saah =

English footballer (born 1986)

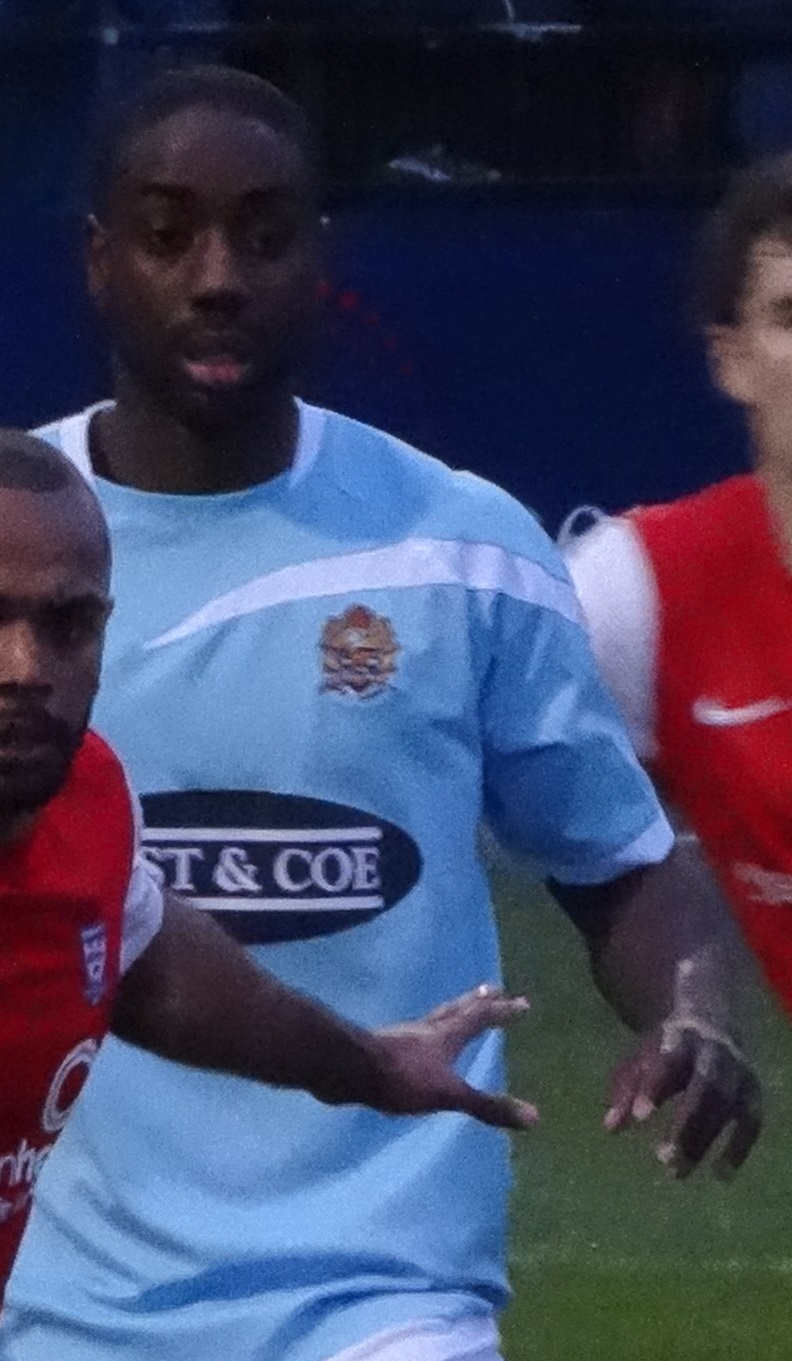
- Saah playing for Dagenham & Redbridge in 2014

Personal information
- Full name: Brian Ebo Saah
- Date of birth: 16 December 1986 (age 39)
- Place of birth: Hornchurch, England
- Height: 6 ft 1 in (1.85 m)
- Position: Defender

Team information
- Current team: West Ham United (recruitment manager)

Youth career
- –2003: Leyton Orient

Senior career*
Years	Team	Apps	(Gls)
2003–2009	Leyton Orient	93	(1)
2009–2011	Cambridge United	73	(6)
2011–2013	Torquay United	78	(2)
2013–2015	Dagenham & Redbridge	66	(0)
2015	→ Woking (loan)	8	(0)
2015–2017	Woking	80	(3)
Total		398	(12)

International career
2010	England C	1	(0)
- * Club domestic league appearances and goals

Brian Ebo Saah (born 16 December 1986) is an English former professional footballer, who is an recruitment manager for Football League Championship side West Ham United.

== Club career ==
=== Leyton Orient ===
Saah was born in Hornchurch, London. He started his career in the youth system at Leyton Orient, making his debut at the age of sixteen in a 3–0 defeat to Huddersfield Town in September 2003. He scored his first goal for the club in a Football League Trophy tie against future club Woking on 28 September 2004. Despite starting as a central midfielder, Saah was converted to a central defender and won praise for his displays deputising for first team regulars John Mackie and Gabriel Zakuani during the 2005–06 promotion season to League One. At the end of the season he was rewarded with his first professional contract.

He began to establish himself in the team and become a first team regular during the 2006–07 season, and was rewarded with a new two-year contract in March 2007. There was also speculation that Premier League club Tottenham Hotspur had offered £2 million for the defender, after scouts had been sent to see him action. However, Orient manager Martin Ling rubbished the story saying the offer would have been accepted, but still claimed that Saah was the best defender outside the Championship. He scored his first league goal in a 3–1 loss at AFC Bournemouth on 26 December 2007. Saah featured quite frequently over the next two seasons but was released at the end of his contract in May 2009, after making a total of 110 appearances scoring twice.

=== Cambridge United ===
Following his release from Orient, he spent time in pre-season at Southend United and Tranmere Rovers on trial, featuring in friendlies against Dagenham & Redbridge and Shrewsbury Town. In August 2009, Saah dropped into the non-league game, re-uniting with former Orient boss Martin Ling at Conference Premier team Cambridge United. He started in all of the U's first seventeen league games, scoring twice before a double hernia operation in November kept him out of action for six weeks. In May 2010, he signed a new two-year contract extension after in impressive first season where he made 33 league appearances and came runner-up in the Internet Player of the Year awards. He was also made club captain, taking some off-field responsibilities away from team captain Paul Carden. In January 2011, Saah found himself playing in a defensive midfield role which coincided with two back-to-back away victories. In total, Saah made eighty appearances for Cambridge scoring eight times.

=== Torquay United ===
In July 2011, Saah signed for League Two club Torquay United reuniting again with Martin Ling, despite him having a year to run on his Cambridge contract. The club didn't want him to leave, but he didn't fit into the new wage structure that the club adopted as they had to slash the playing budget by twenty-five per cent. He was made club captain in his first season at the club as the Gulls missed out on promotion via the play-offs with defeat to Cheltenham Town. Saah again remained a first team regular with Torquay during his second season with the club making 46 appearances, but rejected the offer of a new contract and chose to leave the Gulls in the summer of 2013. He stated that he wanted to find a club nearer his family home in London as his son was starting school. He left having played a total of 86 games, scoring twice.

=== Dagenham & Redbridge ===
In July 2013, he signed for his hometown club Dagenham & Redbridge in League Two on a two-year contract, after impressing in pre-season friendlies. In his first season with the club he forged a strong partnership with Scott Doe as the Daggers finished in the top half narrowly avoiding the play-offs. Featuring 48 times for the club, he was also named as runner-up in the Player of the Year awards. He also scored twice during their Football League Trophy run; once against Colchester United and once against Southend United. He started the 2014–15 season as first choice centre-back continuing his partnership with Scott Doe, but lost his place in the team around Christmas due to the emergence of loan signing Ayo Obileye. In March 2015, he was sent out on loan to Conference Premier club Woking on a 28-day loan in order to help boost their promotion push. The loan deal was extended three weeks later until the end of the season. In May 2015, Saah was released from the club after two seasons, having made 75 appearances and scoring twice.

=== Woking ===
On 6 March 2015, Saah joined Conference Premier club Woking on a 28-day loan. On 24 March 2015, Saah made his Woking debut in a 3–2 victory over Torquay United, in which he played the full 90 minutes.

On 1 August 2015, upon his release from Dagenham & Redbridge, Saah re-joined Woking on a permanent deal after his previous successful loan spell at the club. On 12 September 2015, Saah scored his first Woking goal in a 4–4 draw with Guiseley, in which he scored just before the half time break. On 12 December 2015, Saah netted in Woking's FA Trophy triumph over Boreham Wood, in which he got the equalizer before Giuseppe Sole got the winner in the remaining seconds of the fixture.

On 23 June 2016, Saah signed a new one-year deal at Woking, therefore keeping him at the club for the forthcoming season. On the opening day of the 2016–17 campaign, Saah played the full 90 minutes in Woking's 3–1 home defeat to Lincoln City. On 14 January 2017, Saah scored his first goal of the 2016–17 campaign, in Woking's 2–1 away victory against Torquay United. Netting the Cards' second in the 36th minute after teammate, Fabio Saraiva had given the Surrey-based side the lead inside the opening ten minutes. On 23 May 2017, it was announced that Saah would leave Woking upon the expiry of his current deal in June 2017.

== International career ==
In May 2010, Saah was called up to an eighteen-man squad to play for England C for an International Challenge Trophy match against the Republic of Ireland in Waterford. However, he remained an unused substitute in a 2–1 England win. He made his debut for the team in September 2010, playing in a 2–2 draw with the Wales Semi-Pro team, replacing Aden Flint as a substitute.

== Coaching career ==
Following his release from Woking, Saah decided to retire from professional football in November 2017. He re-joined Leyton Orient as academy coach in July 2019.

On 23 February 2022, following the sacking of Kenny Jackett, Saah was appointed assistant to caretaker manager Matt Harrold.

== Career statistics ==
As of match played 29 April 2017

Appearances and goals by club, season and competition
Club	Season	League			FA Cup		League Cup		Other		Total	
Club	Season	Division	Apps	Goals	Apps	Goals	Apps	Goals	Apps	Goals	Apps	Goals
Leyton Orient	2003–04	Third Division	6	0	0	0	0	0	0	0	6	0
Leyton Orient	2004–05	League Two	12	0	1	0	1	0	3 (Note: Appearance(s) in Football League Trophy)	1	17	1
Leyton Orient	2005–06	League Two	3	0	1	0	0	0	1	0	5	0
Leyton Orient	2006–07	League One	32	0	2	0	1	0	0	0	35	0
Leyton Orient	2007–08	League One	25	1	1	0	0	0	1	0	27	1
Leyton Orient	2008–09	League One	15	0	2	0	1	0	2	0	20	0
Leyton Orient	Total		93	1	7	0	3	0	7	1	110	2
Cambridge United	2009–10	Conference Premier	35	3	3	0	—		3 (Note: Appearances in FA Trophy)	0	41	3
Cambridge United	2010–11	Conference Premier	38	3	1	0	—		2	2	41	5
Cambridge United	Total		73	6	4	0	—		5	2	82	8
Torquay United	2011–12	League Two	35	1	1	0	1	0	3 (Note: One appearance in Football League Trophy, two in League Two play-offs)	0	40	1
Torquay United	2012–13	League Two	43	1	1	0	1	0	1	0	46	1
Torquay United	Total		78	2	2	0	2	0	4	0	86	2
Dagenham & Redbridge	2013–14	League Two	43	0	1	0	1	0	3	2	48	2
Dagenham & Redbridge	2014–15	League Two	23	0	2	0	1	0	1	0	27	0
Dagenham & Redbridge	Total		66	0	3	0	2	0	4	2	75	2
Woking (loan)	2014–15	Conference Premier	8	0	—		—		—		8	0
Woking	2015–16	National League	42	1	0	0	—		3	1	45	2
Woking	2016–17	National League	38	2	4	0	—		2	0	44	2
Woking	Total		88	3	4	0	—		5	1	97	4
Career total			398	12	20	0	7	0	25	6	450	18
