= James Jennings (footballer) =

British footballer (born 1987)

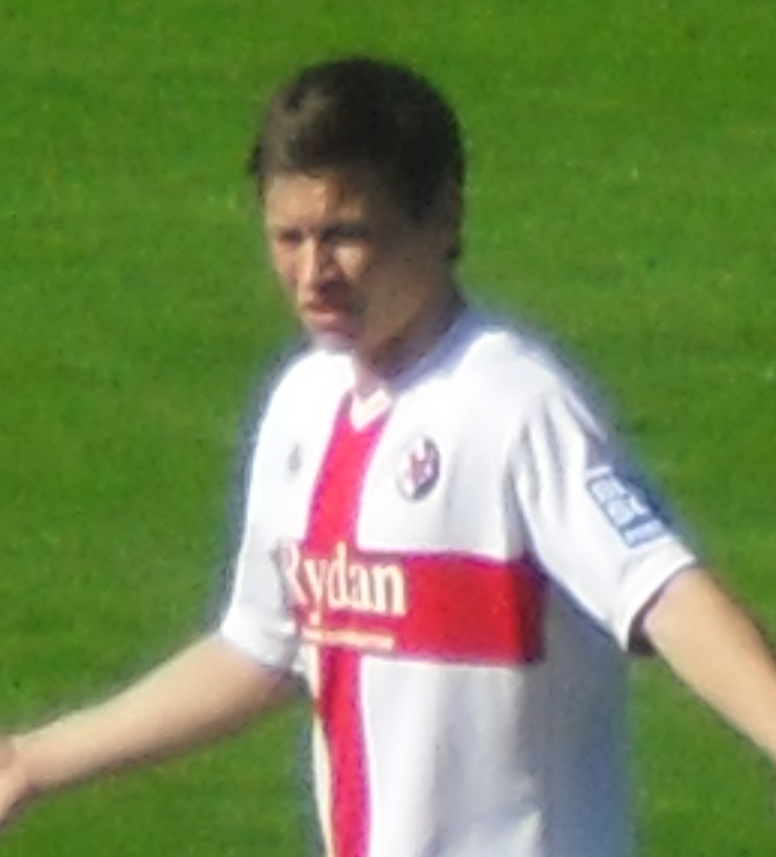

Personal information
- Full name: James Ryan Jennings
- Date of birth: 2 September 1987 (age 39)
- Place of birth: Manchester, England
- Height: 5 ft 11 in (1.80 m)
- Position: Left back

Youth career
- –2006: Manchester City

Senior career*
Years	Team	Apps	(Gls)
2006–2009	Macclesfield Town	38	(1)
2008	→ Altrincham (loan)	9	(0)
2009–2010	Kettering Town	37	(3)
2010–2013	Cambridge United	101	(6)
2013–2014	Mansfield Town	46	(4)
2014–2016	Forest Green Rovers	34	(6)
2016–2017	Cheltenham Town	3	(0)
2016–2017	→ Morecambe (loan)	13	(0)
2017	→ Wrexham (loan)	15	(0)
2017–2020	Wrexham	107	(10)
2020–2021	Stockport County	31	(2)
Total		433	(32)
- * Club domestic league appearances and goals

James Ryan Jennings (born 2 September 1987) is an English former professional footballer who played as a defender. He is working for The Professional Footballers Association (PFA) as a Player Services Executive.

== Career ==
=== Macclesfield Town ===
Born in Manchester, Jennings joined the senior Macclesfield Town team in May 2006 from Manchester City, making his debut in a 1–0 victory against Walsall in the FA Cup as a 90th-minute substitute on 21 November 2006, this led to Jennings famously playing in Macclesfield Town's 3rd Round FA Cup clash against Chelsea at Stamford Bridge in 2007 His League Two debut came in Macclesfield's first league victory of the 2006–07 as they defeated Rochdale 1–0 in December. He finished the season with 11 appearances, after which he was offered a new contract which he accepted a month later. He signed a new deal with the club until the end of the 2007–08 season in December, and after making two appearances for the team that season he joined Conference National side Altrincham on loan. He made his debut in a 2–1 victory over Northwich Victoria on 1 January 2008 and finished this spell with nine appearances before being recalled by Macclesfield in February. He made a further 20 appearances for Macclesfield after his return and was offered a new contract at the end of the season, which he subsequently signed.

=== Kettering Town ===
In the summer of 2009, Jennings left Macclesfield to join Kettering Town. His first appearance for Kettering came in a 2–1 away win over Forest Green Rovers on the opening day of the 2009–10 season. His first goal for the club came in a 2–0 home win against Grays Athletic on 6 March 2010.

=== Cambridge United ===
Jennings joined Cambridge United in summer 2010 from Kettering on a two-year deal for an undisclosed fee decided by a tribunal. He made 43 first team starts in his first season with the club. In his second season with The U's, Jennings was named as vice-captain by new manager Jez George. In January 2012, Jennings put pen to paper in a new deal keeping him at the club until the summer of 2014.

=== Mansfield Town ===
On the final day of the transfer window, 31 January 2013, Jennings left Cambridge United to join Mansfield Town for an undisclosed fee. Jennings signed an 18-month contract with The Stags. He was part of the team which won the league with Mansfield in April 2013, gaining promotion to League Two.

=== Forest Green Rovers ===
On 3 June 2014, Jennings signed for Forest Green Rovers on a two-year deal. A frustrating start to life at Forest Green saw him suffer an anterior cruciate ligament injury in pre-season training. The injury kept him out of action for eight months, however he returned to make his debut in a 2014–15 Conference National play-off semi-final second leg defeat against Bristol Rovers in front of 10,563 supporters.

He scored his first goal for the club on 22 August 2015 in a 3–1 home win against Lincoln City. He then scored twice in a 2–1 win against Bromley on 31 August 2015 to help Forest Green to a seventh straight win at the start of the 2015–16 National League season. He also scored the equaliser in a game that Forest Green went on to win 3–1 against promotion rivals Dover on 14 November 2015.

After registering a new club record highest league finish of second place, he appeared for Forest Green in the play-offs, going onto make an appearance at Wembley Stadium on 15 May 2016 in a 3–1 loss against Grimsby Town. A day later on 16 May 2016, it was confirmed that he was being released by the club at the end of his two-year contract. His efforts over the season earned him a place in the 2015–16 National League team of the year.

=== Cheltenham Town ===
On 26 May 2016 he signed for Cheltenham Town. He scored his first goal for Cheltenham in an EFL Trophy tie against Blackpool on 30 August 2016. A day later it was announced on deadline day that he had joined Cheltenham's League Two rivals Morecambe on loan until January 2017.

=== Wrexham ===
Jennings signed for Wrexham on a loan deal until the end of the 2016–17 season, following in the footsteps of his younger brother Connor who left The Racecourse to join Tranmere the previous season. Following his release from Cheltenham at the end of the season, he resigned with Wrexham on a 2-year deal on 23 May.

=== Stockport County ===
Jennings joined his hometown club Stockport County alongside his Brother Connor Jennings on 16 July 2020.

On 5 August 2021, Jennings announced his retirement from football following knee surgery and advice from a knee consultant.

== Coaching career ==
In July 2022, Jennings was appointed to the newly created role of Head of Professional Player Support at Stockport County having continued to be involved at the club since his retirement twelve months prior.

== Personal life ==
James's younger brother is Connor Jennings who also plays for Tranmere Rovers but is a striker

== Career statistics ==
Appearances and goals by club, season and competition
Club	Season	League			FA Cup		League Cup		Other		Total	
Club	Season	Division	Apps	Goals	Apps	Goals	Apps	Goals	Apps	Goals	Apps	Goals
Macclesfield Town	2006–07	League Two	9	0	2	0	0	0	0	0	11	0
Macclesfield Town	2007–08	League Two	11	0	0	0	0	0	1	0	12	0
Macclesfield Town	2008–09	League Two	18	1	1	0	0	0	0	0	19	1
Macclesfield Town	Total		38	1	3	0	0	0	1	0	42	1
Altrincham (loan)	2007–08	Conference Premier	9	0	0	0	–		0	0	9	0
Kettering Town	2009–10	Conference Premier	36	3	0	0	–		0	0	36	3
Cambridge United	2010–11	Conference Premier	38	1	3	0	–		2	1	43	2
Cambridge United	2011–12	Conference National	41	2	3	0	–		4	1	48	3
Cambridge United	2012–13	Conference National	22	3	1	0	–		2	0	25	3
Cambridge United	Total		101	6	7	0	–		8	2	116	8
Mansfield Town	2012–13	Conference National	13	0	0	0	–		0	0	13	0
Mansfield Town	2013–14	League Two	33	4	1	0	1	0	1	0	36	4
Mansfield Town	Total		46	4	1	0	1	0	1	0	49	4
Forest Green Rovers	2014–15	Conference National	1	0	0	0	–		0	0	1	0
Forest Green Rovers	2015–16	National League	33	6	3	0	–		0	0	36	6
Forest Green Rovers	Total		34	6	3	0	–		0	0	37	6
Cheltenham Town	2016–17	League Two	3	0	0	0	1	0	1	1	5	1
Morecambe (loan)	2016–17	League Two	13	0	2	0	0	0	0	0	15	0
Wrexham (loan)	2016–17	National League	15	0	0	0	–		0	0	15	0
Wrexham	2017–18	National League	40	4	1	0	–		0	0	41	4
Wrexham	2018–19	National League	37	2	4	0	–		3	0	44	2
Wrexham	2019–20	National League	30	4	4	0	–		0	0	34	4
Wrexham	Total		122	10	9	0	–		3	0	134	10
Stockport County	2021–22	National League	31	2	0	0	—		2	0	33	2
Total			433	32	21	0	2	0	16	3	482	35

== Honours ==
Individual

- National League Team of the Year: 2015–16
- National League Champions 2012/2013 Season.
