= Aiden Palmer =

English footballer

Personal information
- Full name: Aiden Witting Palmer
- Date of birth: 2 January 1987 (age 39)
- Place of birth: Enfield, England
- Height: 5 ft 8 in (1.73 m)
- Position: Left back

Youth career
- ?–2005: Leyton Orient

Senior career*
Years	Team	Apps	(Gls)
2005–2009	Leyton Orient	47	(0)
2009	→ Dagenham & Redbridge (loan)	3	(0)
2009–2010	Bishop's Stortford	3	(0)
2010	Cambridge United	15	(0)
2010–2011	Bishop's Stortford	29	(1)
2011–2013	Chelmsford City	82	(3)
2013–2015	Ebbsfleet United	64	(2)
2015	→ Chelmsford City (loan)	11	(1)
2017	Margate	9	(0)
Total		263	(7)
- * Club domestic league appearances and goals as of 21:00, 12 August 2017 (BST)

Aiden Witting Palmer (born 2 January 1987) is an English retired footballer who played in the Football League for Leyton Orient and Dagenham & Redbridge.

== Club career ==
After struggling to keep a first-team place at Leyton Orient, Palmer went on loan to Dagenham & Redbridge on 27 January 2009, and stayed for a month. He made his debut on the same day in the Daggers' 1–1 draw at Grimsby Town. On his return, he made no further appearances for Orient, and was released at the end of the season.

He was subsequently sentenced to 22 months in jail for violent disorder, after being involved with gangs. He joined Bishop's Stortford after his release.

On 11 January 2010, Palmer signed for Cambridge United on a free transfer until the end of the season as a replacement for Anthony Tonkin. The move re-united him with Martin Ling, his former manager at Leyton Orient. On 17 January 2010, Palmer made his debut for Cambridge United against Eastbourne Borough and received the man of the match award. He was released by Ling at the end of the season, whereupon he was re-signed by Bishop's Stortford.

In April 2011, Palmer went on trial with Watford. On 14 April 2011, Watford manager Malky Mackay confirmed that Palmer would remain at Watford on trial until the end of the 2010–11 season.

In June 2011, Palmer signed for Chelmsford City and made over 100 appearances in all competitions before leaving for Ebbsfleet United in June 2013. In August 2015, Palmer re-joined Chelmsford on a loan deal.

On 24 February 2017, Palmer joined Margate on non-contract terms.

On 12 August 2017, Palmer announced his retirement from football due to a reoccurring knee problem.

== Coaching career ==
In 2017, following his retirement, Palmer entered coaching, initially coaching Braintree Town's under-16's, beforing moving up to coach the club's under-18's.
