= 2004–05 Cambridge United F.C. season =

Cambridge United F.C.
2004–05 season
- Chairman: Roger Hunt
- Manager: Hervé Renard (until 12 December 2004); Steve Thompson
- League Two: 24th (relegated)
- FA Cup: First Round
- League Cup: First Round
- Top goalscorer: Shane Tudor (7)
Home colours	Away colours

The 2004–05 season was the 93rd season in the history of Cambridge United F.C., and the club's final season in the Football League after a 35-year stay since their initial election in 1970. As well as relegation to the Football Conference for the first time in the club's history, the club was in disarray off the pitch, entering administration and selling their Abbey Stadium home.

== Background ==
Cambridge United were founded in 1912 as Abbey United, named after the Abbey district of Cambridge. For many years they played amateur football until their election to the Football League in 1970. The early 1990s was Cambridge's most successful period; managed by John Beck the club won the first ever play-off final at Wembley Stadium and gained promotion from the Fourth Division before reaching two successive FA Cup quarter finals in 1990 and 1991 and winning the Third Division in 1991. The club reached the play-offs in 1992 but failed in their bid to become founder members of the Premier League. This was the club's highest final league placing to date and since then it has been in almost constant decline.

The following season the club sacked Beck and were relegated from the First Division. Further relegation followed two seasons later. United returned briefly to Division Two but were relegated in 2002. After struggling in League Two, the best Cambridge fans were hoping for during the season was to avoid relegation and the financial trouble that would bring.

== Match results ==
Win	Draw	Loss

=== League results ===
Date	Opponent	Venue	Result	Scorers	Attendance	Pos.	Ref.
7 August 2004	Wycombe Wanderers	A	1–2	Easter 70'	4,726	15th	
10 August 2004	Leyton Orient	H	1–1	Walker 53'	4,114	14th	
14 August 2004	Shrewsbury Town	H	1–0	Chillingworth 53'	3,135	10th	

=== FA Cup ===
Date	Round	Opponent	Venue	Result	Scorers	Attendance	Ref.
13 November 2004	First round	Halifax Town	A	1–3	Tudor 35'	2,368	

=== League Cup ===
Date	Round	Opponent	Venue	Result	Scorers	Attendance	Ref.
24 August 2004	First round	Watford	A	0–1	—	6,558	

=== Football League Trophy ===
Date	Round	Opponent	Venue	Result	Scorers	Attendance	Ref.
29 September 2004	First round	Boston United	A	1–0	Easter 66'	1,489	
Second round	2 November 2004	Leyton Orient	H	0–2		1,812	

== League table ==
Pos	Team	Pld	W	D	L	GF	GA	GD	Pts	Promotion or relegation
20	Chester City	46	12	16	18	43	69	−26	52	
21	Shrewsbury Town	46	11	16	19	48	53	−5	49	
22	Rushden & Diamonds	46	10	14	22	42	63	−21	44	
23	Kidderminster Harriers (R)	46	10	8	28	39	85	−46	38	Relegation to Conference National
24	Cambridge United (R)	46	8	16	22	39	62	−23	30 (Note: Cambridge United deducted 10 points for entering administration)	Relegation to Conference National

Updated to match(es) played on 15 September 2009. Source: 2004–05 League Two
Rules for classification: 1) points; 2) goal difference; 3) number of goals scored.
(R) Relegated

== See also ==
- 2004–05 in English football
- 2004–05 Football League Two
