= Barbara Howlett =

Australian fungal plant pathologist

Barbara Jane Howlett (/ˈhaʊlɪt/) is an Australian fungal plant pathologist.

== Biography ==
Howlett grew up on a farm, which is a main reason for her interest in agriculture. Howlett received her BSc with honours from the University of Melbourne in 1970, her MSc from the Australian National University in 1973, and her PhD from the University of Melbourne in 1981. She is an honorary professor at the University of Melbourne.

Howlett made major contributions to connecting genetics to applied outcomes in agricultural sciences, especially by exploring the canola (Brassica napus) and blackleg fungus (Leptosphaeria maculans) interaction and developing that into a model system. In 2003 this fungus caused 90% yield losses in parts of Australia. Using discoveries made from this event, Howlett was involved in establishing a nation-wide surveillance program to preempt disease outbreaks: as one example, this research saved canola farmers on Eyre Peninsula, South Australia, at least $18 million in 2012. Howlett was able to identify a pathogenicity gene that encodes for isocitrate lyase, an enzyme that is necessary for the fungus to colonize canola. In the early 2000s her group was the first to discover the genes underlying the synthesis of the important fungal metabolite class, the epipolythiodioxopiperazines, by finding a group of genes for the synthesis of the main toxin produced by L. maculans. In 2011 Howlett led an Australian team of researchers who, along with scientists from the French National Institute for Agricultural Research, sequenced the genome of L. maculans.

She was elected a Fellow of the American Academy of Microbiology in 2012, and Fellow of the Australian Academy of Science in 2014, which described her as a "leading international fungal plant pathologist". Howlett has served as a member of the National Science and Technology Council of Australia, which provides advice to the federal government, specifically the Prime Minister, on important scientific and technological matters.

== Publications ==
Howlett has published numerous scholarly works and edited two books:

- Evolution of Virulence in Eukaryotic Microbes (2012)
- Sustainable strategies for managing Brassica napus (oilseed rape) resistance to Leptosphaeria maculans (phoma stem canker) (2006)
