= Danny Potter =

English footballer (born 1909)

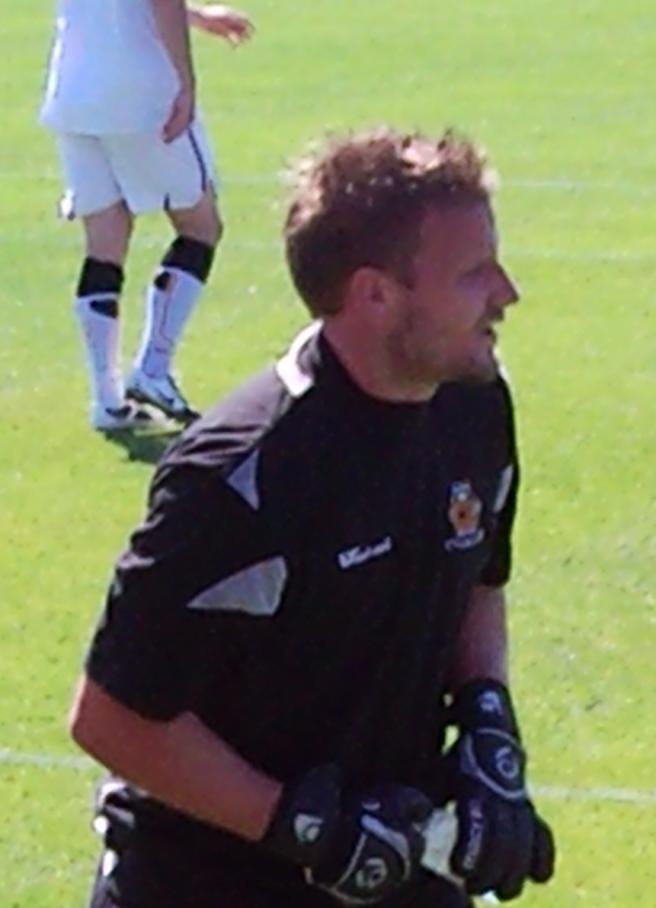

Personal information
- Full name: Daniel Raymond John Potter
- Date of birth: 18 March 1979 (age 47)
- Place of birth: Ipswich, England
- Height: 6 ft 0 in (1.83 m)
- Position: Goalkeeper

Youth career
- Chelsea

Senior career*
Years	Team	Apps	(Gls)
1997–1998	Colchester United	0	(0)
1998–2000	Exeter City	10	(0)
2000	Chelmsford City		
2000–2002	Weymouth	59	(0)
2003–2006	Canvey Island	112	(0)
2006–2007	Stevenage Borough	3	(0)
2007–2010	Cambridge United	114	(0)
2010–2011	Torquay United	9	(0)
2011–2012	Newport County	16	(0)
2012	Staines Town	9	(0)
2012	Eastbourne Borough	7	(0)
2012–2013	Leiston	7	(0)
2013	Eastbourne Borough	16	(0)
2016	Leiston	1	(0)
Total		363	(0)
- * Club domestic league appearances and goals

Daniel Raymond John Potter (born 18 March 1979) is an English retired football goalkeeper.

== Career ==
Born in Ipswich, Danny Potter started his career as a trainee at Premiership club Chelsea but after failing to make the grade there dropped into lower league football with short spells at Chelmsford City, Weymouth and Exeter City. He came to prominence when he joined Canvey Island in March 2003 along with Lee Boylan and Wayne Purser who were with him at Canvey Island, with whom he gained promotion to the Conference, and on a number of occasions proved to be a key player for them with his solid goalkeeping skills. After Canvey dropped out of the Conference, he was signed by Stevenage Borough by new manager Mark Stimson and promptly impressed in pre-season.

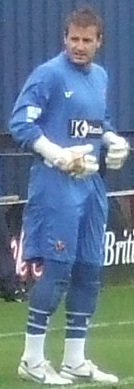
Potter playing for Cambridge United in 2008

As the 2006–07 season began, Potter was first choice, with previous first choice Alan Julian struggling with injury and Potter remained first choice until he was sent off against Crawley Town. After the Crawley game, Potter only played in one more game for the first team, a 2–1 defeat to Burton Albion.

Potter left to join Cambridge United on 22 May 2007. In his first two seasons with Cambridge, Potter helped steer the side towards successive playoff finals, although he was to miss out on the latter through a knee injury. Following the conclusion of the 2009–10 season, Potter was one of nine players released by manager Martin Ling. He joined League Two side Torquay United on 1 July.

On 29 May 2011 he joined Conference National side Newport County, the day after being non-playing substitute for Torquay when they lost 1–0 in the 2011 Football League Two play-off final to Stevenage, at Old Trafford, Manchester. Potter was released by Newport County in March 2012.

On 12 March 2012, it was announced Potter had signed for Conference South side Staines Town. Three months later, Potter signed for league rivals Eastbourne Borough. He left Eastbourne by mutual consent after playing seven games, due to changes in his personal life which made it difficult for him to continue playing for the club.

After leaving Eastbourne Potter joined Leiston in the Isthmian League. Potter rejoined Eastbourne later in the same season. He retired from football after finishing the 2012–13 season at Eastbourne.

After three years in retirement, Potter made one league appearance for Leiston in a 2–2 draw with Tonbridge Angels on 20 September 2016 and the 2–1 defeat away to Westfields in the FA Cup on 15 October 2016.

== TV role ==
In 2002, Potter appeared in Sky One's Dream Team, playing himself, for fictional club Harchester United.

== Honours ==
- Isthmian League: 2004
- FA Trophy: 2007
