= Laurie Ryan =

Laurie Ryan may refer to:

== Sportspeople ==
=== Association football ===
- Laurie Ryan (footballer, born 1963), English footballer who played in the Football League for Cambridge United
- Laurie Ryan (footballer, born 1993), Irish football midfielder who played for Athlone Town and played Gaelic football for County Clare
