= Stefan Van Riel =

Belgian footballer

Personal information
- Date of birth: 29 December 1970 (age 55)
- Place of birth: Belgium
- Position: Defender

Senior career*
Years	Team	Apps	(Gls)
1992–1994	Sint-Niklaas		
1994–1998	Eendracht Aalst	93	(4)
1998	Trelleborg	1	(0)
1998–1999	Oostende	13	(2)
1999–2002	Schoten		
2002–2005	Waasland-Beveren		
2005–2006	Tempo Overijse		
- * Club domestic league appearances and goals

Stefan Van Riel (born 29 December 1970) is a Belgian former professional footballer who played as a defender.

== Career ==
In 1992, Van Riel signed for Belgian second tier side Sint-Niklaas. In 1994, he signed for Eendracht Aalst in the Belgian top flight, where he made 97 appearances and scored 4 goals. On 21 August 1994, Van Riel debuted for Eendracht Aalst during a 3–2 win over Beerschot. On 27 August 1995, he scored his first goal for Eendracht Aalst during a 4–1 win over Lommel.

In 1998, Van Riel signed for Swedish club Trelleborg. After that, he signed for Oostende in the Belgian top flight. In 1999, he signed for Belgian third tier team Schoten after trialing for Wolverhampton Wanderers in the English second tier and Dutch second tier outfit TOP Oss. In 2002, Van Riel signed for Tempo Overijse in the Belgian fifth tier.
