= Howlett =

Howlett is a surname. Howlett was a baptismal name which means, literally, "the son of Hugh". As the naming tradition grew in Europe, baptismal names began to be introduced in many countries. Baptismal names were sometimes given in honour of Christian saints and other biblical figures. Notable people with the surname include:

- Andrew Howlett (born 1967), Australian rules footballer
- Barbara Howlett, Australian fungal plant pathologist
- Charles Howlett (1885–1932), Newfoundland dental surgeon, politician and amateur actor
- David Howlett (born 1951), British sailor
- David J. Howlett, American scholar of religion and contributor to Mormonism: A Historical Encyclopedia
- Doug Howlett (born 1978), New Zealand rugby player
- Elizabeth Howlett (born 1938), British politician
- Eric Howlett (1926–2011), American inventor
- Frank Milburn Howlett (1877–1920), British entomologist
- Gary Howlett (born 1963), Irish international footballer
- Jack Howlett (1912–1999), British mathematician and computer scientist
- Jane Howlett, Australian politician
- John Howlett (1940–2019), English author and screenwriter
- Jeffrey Howlett (1928–2005), Australian modernist architect
- Jordan Howlett (born 1998), American social media personality
- Liam Howlett (born 1971), English record producer, musician, songwriter, and leader of band "The Prodigy"
- Michael Howlett (1914–1992), American politician
- Mike Howlett (born 1950), British musician and producer
- Patrick Howlett (born 1971), Canadian visual artist
- Phil Howlett (born 1975), Tongan rugby league player
- Robert Howlett (1831–1858), British photographer
- Roger Howlett (born 1948), English cricketer
- Rosa Howlett (1863–1961), British artist and suffragette
- Stephen Howlett (born 1951), British housing association chief executive
- Virginia Howlett (born 1951), Canadian designer and painter

== Fictional characters ==
- James "Logan" Howlett, alias The Wolverine from Marvel Comics

== See also ==
- Howletts Wild Animal Park, an English zoo
- Howlite
