= Mark Jones (footballer, born 1979) =

English footballer

Personal information
- Full name: Mark Andrew Jones
- Date of birth: 7 September 1979 (age 47)
- Place of birth: Willenhall, England
- Position: Striker

Youth career
- Aston Villa
- 1994–1998: Wolverhampton Wanderers

Senior career*
Years	Team	Apps	(Gls)
1998–2000	Wolverhampton Wanderers	3	(0)
1999	→ Cheltenham Town (loan)	3	(0)
2000–2001	Chesterfield	9	(0)
2001	→ Raith Rovers (loan)	8	(4)
2001–2002	Raith Rovers	15	(1)
2002–2004	Hednesford Town		
2003	→ Bromsgrove Rovers (loan)		
- * Club domestic league appearances and goals

Mark Andrew Jones (born 7 September 1979) is an English former footballer who played as a striker.

He played in the Football League for Wolverhampton Wanderers, Cheltenham Town and Chesterfield before a spell in Scottish football with Raith Rovers.

== Career ==
Jones began his career as a trainee with Aston Villa before moving to Wolverhampton Wanderers, in a move that cost his new club £75,000 in compensation.

After turning professional, he made his senior debut on 18 August 1998 in a 5–0 League Cup win over Barnet. His first league appearance came on 7 November 1998, as a substitute in a 6–1 victory at Bristol City in the First Division that was Colin Lee's first game in charge.

The striker spent a month on loan at Cheltenham Town in October 1999, where he started his first professional games, before returning to Molineux after four appearances, but no goals. During the remainder of the 1999–2000 season at Wolves he made only one further substitute appearance as the club missed out on the play-offs by one place for the second year in succession.

Unable to break into the Wolves team he moved to Third Division Chesterfield on a free transfer in July 2000. After a handful of appearances and one goal against Rotherham United in the Football League Trophy, he was soon loaned out to Scottish First Division side Raith Rovers in February 2001. Here, he scored four times during eight games.

After a spell of substitute appearances back at Saltergate, Jones returned to Raith in a permanent deal in November 2001. He scored once for his new club during the remainder of the season and at its conclusion he was released, upon which he drifted into non-league football back in the West Midlands.

== Crown Green Bowling ==
Club

Jones has bowled for a whole host of bowling teams in the Staffordshire area including Yale, Penn, Willenhall Nordley and Amery,

In 2016 Jones won the Challenge Cup in a one shot victory over Penn.

In 2020 he left Penn to join Willenhall Nordley but went back to Penn

In 2021 he left Penn to join Willenhall Nordley.

County

In August 2017, Jones was called up to Staffordshire CBA against Potteries & District. He lost 21–12. His first win came in May, 2019 against Merseyside beating Terry Glover 21–20.

== Honours ==
Team

Willenhall Nordley - Challenge Cup Winners 2016

Player

First player to leave Penn and join Nordley twice in one year
