= Martin Ling =

English footballer (born 1966)

Personal information
- Full name: Martin Ling
- Date of birth: 15 July 1966 (age 60)
- Place of birth: West Ham, London, England
- Height: 5 ft 7 in (1.70 m)
- Position: Midfielder

Senior career*
Years	Team	Apps	(Gls)
1983–1986	Exeter City	117	(14)
1986	Swindon Town	2	(0)
1986–1991	Southend United	136	(30)
1991	→ Mansfield Town (loan)	3	(0)
1991–1996	Swindon Town	150	(10)
1996–2000	Leyton Orient	148	(8)
2000	Brighton & Hove Albion	8	(1)
2000–2001	Purfleet		
Total		564	(63)

Managerial career
- 2003–2009: Leyton Orient
- 2009–2011: Cambridge United
- 2011–2013: Torquay United
- 2015: Swindon Town
- * Club domestic league appearances and goals

Martin Ling (born 15 July 1966) is an English football manager and former player and former director of football at Leyton Orient. He played in over 100 Football League matches for each of Exeter City, Southend United, Swindon Town and Leyton Orient, before moving into management. He led Orient for more than five years from 2003 until 2009, and went on to manage Cambridge United, Torquay United and Swindon Town.

== Playing career ==
Born in West Ham, Greater London, Ling started his career with Exeter City. After a brief spell at Swindon Town in which he made just two appearances, Ling began a five-year spell with Southend United in 1986. During this period he won promotion from the Fourth Division twice, in 1987 and 1990. Swindon paid £15,000 to re-sign Ling in March 1991 where he played 150 league games. As a left-winger, he played in the Swindon side that won promotion to the Premier League (via the Division One playoffs) in 1993.

Following his success at Swindon, Ling joined Leyton Orient who he would later go on to coach and manage. He played over 150 games for Orient before transferring to Brighton and Hove Albion in 2000 for a short period. Later in 2000, Ling rejoined Orient as a coach whilst continuing to play semi-professionally for Purfleet in the Isthmian League until hanging up his boots in September 2001.

== Managerial career ==
=== Leyton Orient ===
He was appointed manager of Leyton Orient in December 2003, after a spell as caretaker manager. In the 2005–06 league campaign he guided Orient to automatic promotion from League Two on the final day of the season, and then successfully kept the club in League One in the following season. The following season, Ling was able to bring Leyton Orient to 14th position in League One, after topping the table for three months early in the season. On 18 January 2009, with Leyton Orient in 21st place and in the relegation zone, the decision was taken for Ling and his assistant Dean Smith to leave the club by mutual consent.

After leaving Orient, Ling was hired by Hibernian to set up a network of scouts in England for the Scottish Premier League club, while also identifying players himself. In May 2009, he unsuccessfully applied for the vacant managerial position at Port Vale.

=== Cambridge United ===
In July 2009, Ling was appointed the manager of Cambridge United in the Conference National, succeeding Gary Brabin who despite a successful first season had left the club due to differences with the club's chairman, George Rolls. However, after only eight days at Cambridge, Ling resigned on 4 August 2009 citing irreconcilable differences with Rolls. Cambridge United started the new season under the caretaker stewardship of Paul Carden, but after chairman Rolls left the club on 5 August 2009, Ling said he would be keen to return as manager. On 12 August, sixteen days after his initial appointment, Ling was reappointed as Cambridge manager with Carden as assistant. The Cambridge board praised his honesty, integrity and strength of character during the period between his resignation and reappointment.

After the dramatic off-field start to his Cambridge career, the on-field action started relatively calmly, with Ling guiding the club to 12th after three months of the season, including a 7–0 win over Forest Green Rovers. However, things took a dramatic turn for the worse when the club failed to win a league game between 31 October 2009 and 6 March 2010, which left them in the relegation zone in 21st place. A good end to the season – Cambridge won 9 of the final 14 games – saw Ling guide the club out of the relegation battle to a 10th-place finish.

Ling released a number of the 2009–10 squad at the end of that season, including established players such as Danny Potter and Courtney Pitt, and began to rebuild the squad in time for the upcoming season with the signings of a number of players including former Histon players Danny Wright and Danny Naisbitt in May 2010, as well as talented youngster Jai Reason. The signings of Conal Platt, Adam Miller (who reportedly turned down interest from League One sides Sheffield Wednesday and Bradford City to join the club), and veteran striker Daryl Clare, who arrived for a fee of £10,000, the signing led Ling to claim that his squad was all-but complete.

The season started really badly, however, with no win coming until the 6th game, at home to Eastbourne Borough. Despite a short FA Cup run, which ended in a 2–1 First Round replay at League One Huddersfield Town, following a televised 0–0 at the Abbey, Ling's signings generally struggled on and off the field. After four consecutive losses, including to lowly Hayes & Yeading, the board were forced to issue a vote of confidence in Ling's management. Despite this, the club's poor form continued. Following a goalless draw with Histon, there were chants of "Ling Out". However Ling refused to quit, stating "they [the fans] can moan all they like, but I'm going nowhere". Ling was sacked by the Cambridge United board after a further run of four straight defeats.

Martin Ling unsuccessfully applied for the Grimsby Town managerial vacancy a month later.

=== Torquay United ===
He was appointed Torquay United manager on 13 June 2011 after the departure of Paul Buckle to Bristol Rovers. With Buckle taking goalkeeper Scott Bevan and forward Chris Zebroski with him to the Memorial Stadium, Ling made moves for strikers Rene Howe and Taiwo Atieno, midfielders Chris McPhee and Ian Morris, defenders Brian Saah, Daniel Leadbitter and Joe Oastler, and goalkeepers Bobby Olejnik and Martin Rice.

Ling's first game in charge of United was the 2–1 friendly win over Tiverton Town. His new-look Torquay side had a good pre-season, winning against Exeter City, Bristol City, Truro City and Weston-super-Mare as well as Tiverton, and losing just once, to Burnley. Ling also had a good start in League Two, drawing against Burton Albion on the opening day of the season before recording away wins at Bristol Rovers and Aldershot Town, leaving Torquay fourth in the table after three league games.

On 2 January 2012, Ling guided Torquay United to a 2–1 win over Plymouth Argyle at Home Park; having beaten the Pilgrims 3–1 at Plainmoor earlier in the season, this ensured a first double win over Plymouth Argyle since 1972. Although they occupied an automatic promotion spot on several occasions towards the end of the season, a late loss of form – which saw United fail to win any of their last five league fixtures – meant that Torquay had to settle for a play-off place. The club was drawn to play Cheltenham Town in the play-off semi-finals, and, following a 2–0 loss at Whaddon Road, a 2–1 reverse in the home leg at Plainmoor condemned Torquay to another year in League Two.

Ling made a number of transfers ahead of the 2012–13 season, releasing forward Taiwo Atieno, defenders Lathaniel Rowe-Turner and Ed Palmer; signing Craig Easton, Ryan Jarvis, Nathan Craig, Michael Poke and Aaron Downes on free transfers; and purchasing Billy Bodin from Swindon Town for £70,000 – just £5,000 less than Torquay's record fee paid, for Leon Constantine in 2004.

Torquay also sold Olejnik to Peterborough United for £300,000, defender Mark Ellis to Crewe Alexandra for £80,000, and midfielder Eunan O'Kane to AFC Bournemouth for £150,000.

Ahead of the 2012–13 season, Ling targeted an automatic promotion berth, telling BBC Radio Devon: "I would set my sights at the top three with the play-offs as the safety ... if you don't set out to finish where the success lies, you're selling yourself short." Opening their league campaign with a 0–0 draw at newly promoted Fleetwood Town, Torquay drew four of their first five fixtures, their other early result a 4–2 win over Rochdale.

After taking the Torquay job, Ling wrote a weekly column in the local newspaper Herald Express, covering both his playing and managerial career as well as sport in general. On 28 January 2013 Assistant Shaun Taylor led Torquay to victory away at Exeter City, with Ling away suffering from an illness. It was from this point that Ling commenced a four-month absence from the club to receive treatment for depression. In his absence Alan Knill was appointed caretaker manager until such time as Ling was fit to resume his post. On 29 April 2013 Torquay United controversially announced that it would be terminating Ling's contract with immediate effect, saying that "the decision is based purely on footballing grounds, after falling from play-off contenders last season to just escaping relegation this time around, and early exits in all three cup competitions." However the club thanked Ling for his work over the last two years and wished him every success in the future.

=== Swindon Town ===
On 3 November 2015, Ling was named as manager of League One side Swindon Town, a club he had two spells with as a player. However, Ling resigned on 29 December 2015 for health reasons.

=== Return to Leyton Orient ===
On 23 June 2017 Ling was named as director of football of Conference side Leyton Orient

On 6 March 2026, it was announced that Ling had left his role as Director of Football at the club.

== Personal life ==
In August 2019 Ling discussed his mental health problems.

His son is Sam Ling.

== Honours ==
=== Player ===
Swindon Town

- Football League First Division play-offs: 1993
- Football League Second Division: 1995–96

Individual

- PFA Team of the Year: 1997–98 Third Division

=== Manager ===
Leyton Orient

- Football League Two promotion: 2005–06

Individual

- Football League Two Manager of the Month: October 2005, January 2012, March 2012
