= Conal Platt =

English semi-professional footballer

Personal information
- Full name: Conal James Platt
- Date of birth: 14 October 1986 (age 40)
- Place of birth: Preston, England
- Height: 1.76 m (5 ft 9 1/2 in)
- Position: Forward

Team information
- Current team: Waverley Park FC 2021-Present

Youth career
- Liverpool

Senior career*
| Years | Team | Apps | (Gls) |
| 2004–2005 | Liverpool | 0 | (0) |
| 2006–2007 | AFC Bournemouth | 0 | (0) |
| 2006 | → Morecambe (loan) | 3 | (0) |
| 2007 | → Weymouth (loan) | 11 | (0) |
| 2007–2008 | Weymouth | 20 | (2) |
| 2008 | → Rushden & Diamonds (loan) | 10 | (0) |
| 2008–2010 | Forest Green Rovers | 80 | (10) |
| 2010–2012 | Cambridge United | 33 | (2) |
| 2011 | → AFC Telford United (loan) | 3 | (0) |
| 2011 | → Lincoln City (loan) | 8 | (2) |
| 2012–2013 | Lincoln City | 7 | (0) |
| 2013 | Gainsborough Trinity | 9 | (0) |
| 2013–2014 | Stalybridge Celtic | 22 | (3) |
| Total | | 206 | (19) |
- * Club domestic league appearances and goals as of 23:44, 15 September 2015 (UTC)

Conal James Platt (born 14 October 1986) is a semi-professional footballer who plays as a forward.

He signed for Waverley Park FC in 2021 and won league 2 promotion with the mighty greens led by Paul Hopkins.

== Early life ==
Platt has one older brother and two younger sisters. He is eligible to play for the Republic of Ireland due to his Irish descent from his grandfather, Timothy Bryan. He was discovered by a Liverpool scout whilst playing for Fulwood and Cadley boys football club.

== Career ==
He played for Preston Schoolboys aged 14–15, one of the most successful schoolboy teams Preston ever had. Aged 16 he went on to play for Lancashire Schools, Northwest Counties Schools and was finally selected for the English Schools squad (teams are selected on where you go school not on nationality). He was also an Irish Youth international.

After finishing his high school studies at Our Lady's High School he continued his studies on a scholarship at Liverpool Football Academy. After regular appearances with both the youth team and Liverpool reserves although he was released by Liverpool at the end of the 2005 season, after failing to make the grade.

He joined AFC Bournemouth in May 2006 and made his debut after coming on as a substitute in the 75th minute in a 3–1 defeat to Southend United in the League Cup. He joined Morecambe on loan, initially for a period of one month, in November 2006. Limited to a few appearances at Morecambe, Platt picked up an injury in a match against Southport, and returned to Bournemouth when his loan ended in January 2007, before being loaned again to Weymouth. He was released by Bournemouth in May 2007 and joined Weymouth permanently.

Platt joined Rushden & Diamonds on loan in February 2008 where he made a total of 10 appearances.

On 20 May 2008 it was announced that Platt had joined Forest Green Rovers. He impressed in his first season with Forest Green and earned himself a one-year contract for the 2009–10 season.

Platt joined Cambridge United in June 2010 after featuring in 80 league games for Forest Green, whilst scoring 10 goals in a two-season spell. A compensation fee was agreed by both clubs for the transfer. Platt begun the season well, although an early injury hindered him and he never really regained full form for the rest of the 2010–11 campaign.

Platt joined fellow Conference National side AFC Telford United on loan in September 2011 for a month. He returned to Cambridge United in October 2011.

Platt was then sent out on loan again to Lincoln City and when he returned to Cambridge in January 2012 he had his contract terminated and subsequently signed an 18-month permanent contract at Sincil Bank with Lincoln. On 21 February 2012 he suffered a broken tibia following a 50/50 challenge with James Chambers in a behind-closed-doors friendly against Doncaster Rovers. The injury would keep him out of action for almost a year, with Platt describing the recovery as a mental process as well as a physical one. He returned to action as a late substitute for Nicky Nicolau is Lincoln City's 4-2 Football Conference defeat at Southport on 8 January 2013 but this would prove to be his last action for the club as he left the club by mutual consent on 7 March 2013 with the club's new manager Gary Simpson reasoning that the club's relegation battle meant that Platt was unable to be given the games needed to regain full fitness. Platt immediately joined Gainsborough Trinity on a free transfer, making nine Football Conference North appearances for the club without scoring, before leaving the club at the end of the season having returned to the North-West to live.

In July 2013 he joined Stalybridge Celtic, linking up with his former boss at Forest Green, Jim Harvey.
