= Danny Naisbitt =

English footballer

Personal information
- Full name: Daniel James Naisbitt
- Date of birth: 25 November 1978 (age 47)
- Place of birth: Bishop Auckland, England
- Height: 6 ft 1 in (1.85 m)
- Position: Goalkeeper

Youth career
- –1997: Middlesbrough

Senior career*
Years	Team	Apps	(Gls)
1997–1999	Walsall	0	(0)
1999–2003	Barnet	64	(0)
2002	→ Carlisle United (loan)	1	(0)
2003	Harlow Town		
2003	Brentford	0	(0)
2003	Cambridge City	2	(0)
2004	Hendon	1	(0)
2004	Dagenham & Redbridge	7	(0)
2004–2005	AFC Wimbledon	25	(0)
2005	→ Lewes (loan)	6	(0)
2005–2007	Cambridge City	68	(0)
2007–2010	Histon	106	(0)
2010	→ Brighton & Hove Albion (loan)	0	(0)
2010–2012	Cambridge United	59	(0)
2012–2013	Braintree Town	24	(0)
2013	Harlow Town	1	(0)
- * Club domestic league appearances and goals

Daniel James Naisbitt (born 21 November 1978) is an English football goalkeeper.

== Career ==
Born in Bishop Auckland, Naisbitt began his career as a trainee with Middlesbrough, joining Walsall turning professional in 1997, but failed to make the Walsall first team and moved to Barnet in 1999. He had a loan spell with Carlisle United in August 2002 and was released by Barnet in September 2003.

He joined Harlow Town, joining Brentford on non-contract forms as cover for Paul Smith in November 2003. Later the same month he joined Cambridge City and played one match for Hendon in March 2004. In June 2004 Naisbitt joined AFC Wimbledon, leaving to rejoin Cambridge City in October 2005. He left to join Histon in May 2007, making his competitive debut on 20 September 2007, in a televised game against Oxford United. In 2007 for Histon he kept 3 clean sheets and conceded 27 goals in 19 games, but despite that he kept his place over Marc Osborn in goal.

In March 2010, Naisbitt joined League One Brighton & Hove Albion, on loan until the end of the 2009–10 season. On the season's conclusion he signed for Histon's near neighbours Cambridge United. Naisbitt left Cambridge United on 15 May 2012 after the two parties failed to agree a new deal.

In August 2012, he signed for Conference National side Braintree Town.
