= 1999–2000 Cambridge United F.C. season =

Cambridge United
1999–2000 season
- Manager: Roy McFarland
- Football League Second Division: 19th
- FA Cup: Fifth round
- League Cup: First round
- Football League Trophy: First Round
- Top goalscorer: Trevor Benjamin (23)
Home colours

During the 1999–2000 English football season, Cambridge United F.C. competed in the Football League Second Division where they finished in 19th position on 48 points.

== Final league table ==
=== Second Division ===
Pos	Team	Pld	W	D	L	GF	GA	GD	Pts	Promotion or relegation
17	Brentford	46	13	13	20	47	61	−14	52	
18	Colchester United	46	14	10	22	59	82	−23	52	
19	Cambridge United	46	12	12	22	64	65	−1	48	
20	Oxford United	46	12	9	25	43	73	−30	45	
21	Cardiff City (R)	46	9	17	20	45	67	−22	44	Relegation to the Third Division

Rules for classification: 1) Points; 2) Goal difference; 3) Goals scored
(R) Relegated

== Results ==
Cambridge United's score comes first

=== Legend ===
Win	Draw	Loss

=== Football League Division Two ===
Match	Date	Opponent	Venue	Result	Attendance	Scorers
1	7 August 1999	Bournemouth	A	1–2	5,552	Butler 21'
2	14 August 1999	Reading	H	3–1	4,630	Kyd 35', Benjamin 59', Duncan 68'
3	21 August 1999	Chesterfield	A	2–4	2,816	Benjamin 8', Wanless 61'
4	28 August 1999	Notts County	H	1–1	4,329	Butler 58'
5	30 August 1999	Wigan Athletic	A	1–1	5,976	Taylor 77'
6	4 September 1999	Stoke City	H	1–3	4,007	Lightbourne 47' (o.g.)
7	11 September 1999	Brentford	A	2–2	4,234	Butler 48' (pen), Benjamin 81'
8	18 September 1999	Millwall	A	1–2	7,278	Butler 53' (pen)
9	25 September 1999	Gillingham	H	2–2	7,278	Butler 60' (pen), Wanless 64'
10	2 October 1999	Preston North End	A	1–2	9,522	Butler 36'
11	9 October 1999	Wycombe Wanderers	A	0–1	5,345	
12	15 October 1999	Colchester United	H	5–2	5,039	Butler 29', 85', 89', Greene (o.g.) 37', Benjamin 74'
13	19 October 1999	Burnley	H	0–1	4,320	
14	23 October 1999	Gillingham	A	1–2	6,417	Youngs 17'
15	2 November 1999	Scunthorpe United	H	1–3	3,285	Kyd 64'
16	6 November 1999	Bristol City	A	1–1	8,646	Butler 2'
17	12 November 1999	Luton Town	H	3–1	6,211	Butler 39', Benjamin 44', Kyd 59'
18	23 November 1999	Wrexham	A	1–1	3,467	Benjamin 20'
19	27 November 1999	Blackpool	A	1–2	4,040	Butler 82'
20	4 December 1999	Bournemouth	H	0–2	3,579	
21	18 December 1999	Oldham Athletic	H	2–3	3,162	Butler 43', 72'
22	26 December 1999	Oxford United	A	0–1	6,772	
23	28 December 1999	Cardiff City	H	0–0	4,250	
24	3 January 2000	Bristol Rovers	A	0–1	9,822	
25	15 January 2000	Reading	H	0–0	6,953	
26	22 January 2000	Chesterfield	H	2–0	3,819	Benjamin 44', 66'
27	5 February 2000	Wigan Athletic	H	1–1	3,755	Youngs 90'
28	12 February 2000	Stoke City	A	0–1	9,662	
29	15 February 2000	Notts County	A	3–2	4,053	Richardson 51' (o.g.), Youngs 69', Benjamin 90'
30	19 February 2000	Blackpool	H	0–2	4,636	
31	22 February 2000	Bury	A	2–0	3,088	Taylor 68', Eustace 75'
32	25 February 2000	Millwall	H	0–2	5,116	
33	4 March 2000	Brentford	A	1–1	4,987	Benjamin 2'
34	7 March 2000	Bristol City	H	3–0	3,505	Youngs 5', 76', Benjamin 87'
35	11 March 2000	Scunthorpe United	A	3–0	3,964	Taylor 15', Youngs 63', Benjamin 83'
36	18 March 2000	Wrexham	H	3–4	4,591	Youngs 29', 53' Benjamin 90'
37	21 March 2000	Luton Town	A	2–2	5,379	Benjamin 26', Ashbee 56'
38	25 March 2000	Oxford United	H	2–0	5,127	Benjamin 8', Hansen 44'
39	1 April 2000	Oldham Athletic	A	0–1	4,988	
40	4 April 2000	Bury	H	3–0	3,016	Wanless 7', Benjamin 25', Hansen 33'
41	8 April 2000	Bristol Rovers	A	1–1	4,536	Benjamin 11'
42	15 April 2000	Cardiff City	A	4–0	6,592	Taylor 20', 57', 61', Hunt 86'
43	22 April 2000	Colchester United	A	1–3	4,902	Benjamin 53'
44	24 April 2000	Preston North End	H	2–0	6,068	Hansen 8', Benjamin 44'
45	29 April 2000	Burnley	A	0–2	15,084	
46	6 May 2000	Wycombe Wanderers	H	1–2	5,335	Benjamin 36'

=== League Cup ===
Round	Date	Opponent	Venue	Result	Attendance	Scorers
R1 1st Leg	10 August 1999	Bristol City	H	2–2	2,813	Butler 50', 86'
R1 2nd Leg	24 August 1999	Bristol City	A	1–2	5,352	Butler 87'

=== FA Cup ===
Round	Date	Opponent	Venue	Result	Attendance	Scorers
R1	30 October 1999	Gateshead	H	1–0	2,970	Taylor 79'
R2	20 November 1999	Bamber Bridge	H	1–0	3,303	Butler 71' (pen)
R3	10 December 1999	Crystal Palace	H	2–0	5,631	Benjamin 74', Wanless 81'
R4	8 January 2000	Wrexham	A	2–1	7,186	Benjamin 15', Butler 52'
R5	29 January 2000	Bolton Wanderers	H	1–3	7,523	Benjamin 29'

=== Football League Trophy ===
Round	Date	Opponent	Venue	Result	Attendance	Scorers
R1	11 January 2000	Barnet	H	1–2	1,556	Youngs 27'

== Squad ==
Appearances for competitive matches only

Pos.	Name	League		FA Cup		League Cup		Football League Trophy		Total	
Pos.	Name	Apps	Goals	Apps	Goals	Apps	Goals	Apps	Goals	Apps	Goals
FW	(England) Zema Abbey	2(6)	0	0	0	0	0	0	0	2(6)	0
MF	(England) Ian Ashbee	43(2)	1	5	0	2	0	0	0	50(2)	1
FW	(Jamaica) Trevor Benjamin	42(2)	20	5	3	2	0	0	0	49(2)	23
FW	(England) Martin Butler	26	14	5	2	2	3	0	0	36	19
FW	(Jamaica) Darren Byfield	3(1)	0	0	0	0	0	0	0	3(1)	0
MF	(England) Jamie Cassidy	4(4)	0	0	0	0(1)	0	1	0	5(5)	0
DF	(England) Ben Chenery	17(1)	0	0	0	2	0	1	0	20(1)	0
FW	(England) Daniel Chillingworth	0(3)	0	0	0	0	0	0(1)	0	0(4)	0
DF	(Scotland) Tom Cowan	4	0	0	0	0	0	0	0	4	0
DF	(England) Andy Duncan	13	1	0	0	2	0	0	0	15	1
DF	(England) Scott Eustace	34(1)	1	3	0	2	0	0	0	39(1)	1
MF	(Northern Ireland) Mark Graham	0(1)	0	0	0	0(1)	0	0	0	0(2)	0
FW	(England) Steve Guinan	4(2)	0	0(2)	0	0	0	1	0	5(4)	0
MF	(Denmark) John Hansen	12(4)	3	0	0	0	0	0	0	12(4)	3
FW	(England) Jonathan Hunt	3(4)	1	0	0	0	0	0	0	3(4)	1
DF	(England) Jason Kavanagh	19	0	3	0	0	0	0	0	22	0
MF	(Wales) Adam King	0(1)	0	0	0	0	0	0	0	0(1)	0
FW	(England) Michael Kyd	12(6)	3	1	0	2	0	1	0	16(6)	3
FW	(England) Nathan Lamey	2(1)	0	0	0	0	0	0	0	2(1)	0
MF	(England) Neil MacKenzie	19(3)	0	0	0	0	0	0(1)	0	19(3)	0
GK	(England) Shaun Marshall	23(1)	0	4	0	0	0	0	0	27(1)	0
DF	(Scotland) Martin McNeil	29	0	4	0	0	0	0	0	33	0
DF	(England) Rob Miller	0(1)	0	0	0	0	0	0	0	0(1)	0
MF	(England) Neil Mustoe	28(5)	0	4	0	2	0	0	0	34(5)	0
DF	(Scotland) Scott Paterson	6	0	1	0	0	0	0	0	7	0
GK	(France) Lionel Pérez	9	0	0	0	0	0	0	0	9	0
MF	(England) David Preece	1(11)	0	0	0	0	0	1	0	2(11)	0
MF	(England) Alex Russell	14(1)	0	2	0	1	0	1	0	17(1)	0
DF	(England) Adam Tann	0	0	0	0	0	0	1	0	1	0
FW	(England) John Taylor	18(19)	6	1(3)	1	0(2)	0	0	0	19(24)	7
MF	(England) Paul Wanless	39(3)	3	4(1)	1	1	0	1	0	45(4)	4
DF	(England) Clive Wilson	27	0	4	0	2	0	1	0	34	0
FW	(England) Tom Youngs	12(10)	8	0	0	0(1)	0	1	1	13(11)	9
GK	(Netherlands) Arjan van Heusden	14(1)	0	1	0	2	0	1	0	18(1)	0

== See also ==
- 1999–2000 in English football
