= 2002 Football League Trophy final =

2002 Football League Trophy Final
- Event: 2001–02 Football League Trophy
Blackpool	Cambridge United
4	1
- Date: 24 March 2002
- Venue: Millennium Stadium, Cardiff
- Referee: R.D.Furnandiz (Doncaster)
- Attendance: 20,287

The 2002 Football League Trophy Final (known as the LDV Vans Trophy for sponsorship reasons) was the 19th final of the Football League Trophy – a domestic football cup competition for teams from the Football League Second and Third Division. The match was played at the Millennium Stadium in Cardiff, and was contested by Blackpool and Cambridge United on 24 March 2002. Blackpool won the match 4–1.

== Match details ==
24 March 2002
14:00 BST

Blackpool	4–1	Cambridge United
Murphy 6'; Clarke 54'; Hills 77'; Taylor 82'	(Report)	Wanless 28' (pen.)

Millennium Stadium, Cardiff
Attendance: 20,287
Referee: R.D.Furnandiz (Doncaster)

Blackpool	Cambridge United

GK	1	Phil Barnes
RB	3	Tommy Jaszczun	Booked
CB	26	Ian Marshall (c)	(substituted off) 39'
CB	29	Chris Clarke
CB	4	John O'Kane	Booked
LB	15	John Hills
CM	14	Lee Collins
CM	7	Richie Wellens	(substituted off) 84'
CM	24	Martin Bullock
CF	9	John Murphy
CF	10	Scott Taylor	(substituted off) 84'
Substitutes:
GK	13	James Pullen
DF	5	Ian Hughes	(substituted on) 39'
DF	11	Paul Simpson	(substituted on) 84'
MF	23	Graham Fenton
FW	25	Richard Walker	(substituted on) 84'
Manager:
Steve McMahon

GK	1	Lionel Pérez
RB	21	Adam Tann
CB	4	Andy Duncan
CB	6	Stevland Angus	(substituted off) 85'
LB	33	Fred Murray
RM	20	Shane Tudor	(substituted off) 60'
CM	14	Luke Guttridge	Booked
CM	3	Ian Ashbee
LM	7	Paul Wanless (c)
CF	9	Dave Kitson	(substituted off) 73'
CF	10	Tom Youngs
Substitute:
GK	13	Shaun Marshall
DF	25	Danny Jackman	(substituted on) 60'
DF	32	Warren Goodhind	(substituted on) 85'
MF	8	Terry Fleming
FW	31	Armand One	(substituted on) 73'
Manager:
John Taylor

MATCH RULES

- 90 minutes.
- 30 minutes of extra-time if necessary.
- Penalty shoot-out if scores still level.
- Maximum of 3 substitutions.
