= History of Cambridge United F.C. =

History of an English football club

The history of Cambridge United F.C. covers over 100 years. Since establishment in 1912 as Abbey United to play friendly games, the club grew quickly and was eventually elected to the Football League, of which it was a member for 35 years before relegation in 2005. The club came close to becoming a founding member of the Premier League in 1992 and competed in the Football League One, following promotion back to the Football League in 2014 and a subsequent promotion from Football League Two in 2021, until the 2024–25 season, after finishing 23rd in League One, where they were relegated to the Football League Two

== History ==
=== From inception to the professional league ===
The club was founded in 1912 as Abbey United (named after the Abbey district of Cambridge in which they play); although a club called Cambridge United existed in Cambridge from 1909, it was not linked to the club that exists today. The club played in local amateur leagues, with some success, for many of its early years, moving from ground to ground around Cambridge (see Cambridge United § Stadium) before settling at the Abbey Stadium. In 1949 the club turned professional, and changed its name to Cambridge United in 1951. They played in the Eastern Counties League until finishing as runners-up in 1957–58, which saw them elected to the Southern League. Three years later, Cambridge United reached the Premier Division of the Southern League.

The club was elected to the Football League in 1970 to replace Bradford (Park Avenue), after back-to-back titles in the Southern League. Eight years later they reached the Second Division and peaked at 8th place in 1980, but went back down to the Third Division in 1984 after winning just 4 league games all season. A second successive relegation followed in 1985, again after only 4 wins, and a year later Cambridge United finished third from bottom in the Fourth Division – this was the last season in which the league's bottom four clubs had to apply for re-election. Luckily, Cambridge United and the other three teams retained their league status.

Cambridge United gradually improved, and as the 1980s drew to a close, they were looking like promotion challengers.

=== Glory in the early 1990s ===
Cambridge United's biggest successes came in the late 1980s and early 1990s. They won the Fourth Division playoffs under John Beck in 1990, beating Chesterfield 1–0 at Wembley. The following year United were crowned champions of the Third Division. Their key player of this era was high scoring centre forward Dion Dublin, who had joined the club on a free transfer from Norwich City in 1988. Dublin powered Cambridge United to their best-ever league finish in 1992 – they finished 5th in the Second Division and qualified for the promotion playoffs, hoping that they would complete a unique third successive promotion and play in the first season of the new Premier League. After drawing 1–1 at home in the first leg of the semi-finals with Leicester City, they were hammered 5–0 in the second leg and their promotion dreams were over. Dublin left soon afterwards, for Manchester United in a £1million deal.

=== Decline in the mid-1990s ===
John Beck was sacked in October 1992 with Cambridge United battling relegation from the new Division One, and Birmingham midfielder Ian Atkins was named player-manager. Atkins was unable to steer the U's clear of relegation (although he did take them to the quarter-finals of the League Cup) and he was replaced by Beck's former assistant Gary Johnson.

Cambridge United finished 10th in the 1993–94 Division Two campaign, but they struggled the following season. They may be considered unlucky to be relegated as league reconstruction that season meant the team finishing 5th from bottom went down, which is where United finished.

Tommy Taylor was appointed manager just before Cambridge United's relegation to Division Three, and they were among the pre-season favourites for promotion. A 16th-place finish in 1995–96 was way below expectations, but a promising start to 1996–97 gave supporters hope for promotion success.

=== 1999 promotion glory ===
Taylor then moved to Leyton Orient and was replaced by Roy McFarland, who delivered promotion back to Division Two in 1999.

Since achieving promotion to Division Two in 1999, United have been plagued by a series of problems on and off the pitch. Historically, United have relied on big player sales to fund wages. When the player market dried up, the directors turned to loans, supporter fund-raising and eventually a ground sale to pay off debts.

=== Relegation in 2002 ===
McFarland left the club in March 2001, with John Beck returning and saving the club from relegation. However this time around Beck was less than successful and was sacked half-way through the 2001–02 season to be replaced by veteran striker John Taylor who was given the role of player-manager. Taylor took Cambridge United to the final of the LDV Vans Trophy, where they made their only appearance at the Millennium Stadium in Cardiff. The U's were easily beaten, losing 4–1. Taylor was also unable to prevent relegation to Division Three. He remained in charge until March 2004, with Cambridge United struggling in the bottom half of Division Three, when the club's board terminated his contract and named Frenchman Claude Le Roy as his successor. Le Roy won four of the remaining eight matches and kept United in the league by a comfortable margin. The following season he made way for assistant Hervé Renard, who in turn lasted just five months before being sacked and replaced by Steve Thompson. The two brightest prospects, Dave Kitson and John Ruddy were sold in 2004 and 2005 respectively, but the club's debts remained at over £500,000.

=== Relegation to the Conference ===
Thompson was unable to save Cambridge United from relegation and their demotion to the Football Conference – after 35 years in the Football League – was confirmed on 23 April 2005. This downfall comes just 14 years after the club won the old Third Division title, and just 13 years after they almost gained promotion to the inaugural season of the Premier League. With no prospect of repaying its debts of nearly £1 million, the Club filed for administration on 29 April. As part of a cost-cutting exercise, Thompson and four other backroom staff were sacked by the administrators. Coach Rob Newman took over as team manager.

=== Financial plight ===
On 22 July 2005 the club came out of administration with a deal being struck with HM Revenue and Customs at the eleventh hour, after the intervention of then sports minister Richard Caborn, and had no worries about starting the 2005–06 Conference National campaign. Rob Newman was unable to bring anything greater than a 12th-place finish in the 2005–06 Conference National final table.

Financial troubles remained, although with the burden of huge debts now lifted, and in December 2005 it was revealed that the club were in talks with their city neighbours Cambridge City about a possible merger. It was suggested by both parties that Cambridge, with a population of only 140,000, was not big enough to support two professional football clubs and a merger would be beneficial for both teams and guarantee the future of at least one team in the city. However, both sets of fans reacted badly to the news citing their club's individual identities as obstacles, with City fans particularly anxious that it would be a takeover by United rather than a merger.

Long standing Club Chairman Reg Smart resigned from his role in early 2002 after 12 years in charge. Following brief stints from Gary Harwood (2002–5) and Roger Hunt (2005–6), Terry Baker took over the reins in February 2006. However, Baker's tenure ended suddenly at a Board meeting on 5 June 2006 citing unworkable relationships within the board as his reason for resignation, which led to the appointment of Brian Attmore (Fans' Director) as Acting Chairman on 6 June. The fallout from this event led major shareholder Paul Barry to claim there are "deep divisions within the club at staff and board level" and that a new board had to be put in place to ensure stability at the club so that it could achieve the aim of promotion back to the Football League. Any new board would have to continue to deal with financial troubles which were reaffirmed with the news in late June 2006 that fans group Cambridge Fans United had loaned the club £20,000 to pay wages.

=== Revival and return to Football League ===
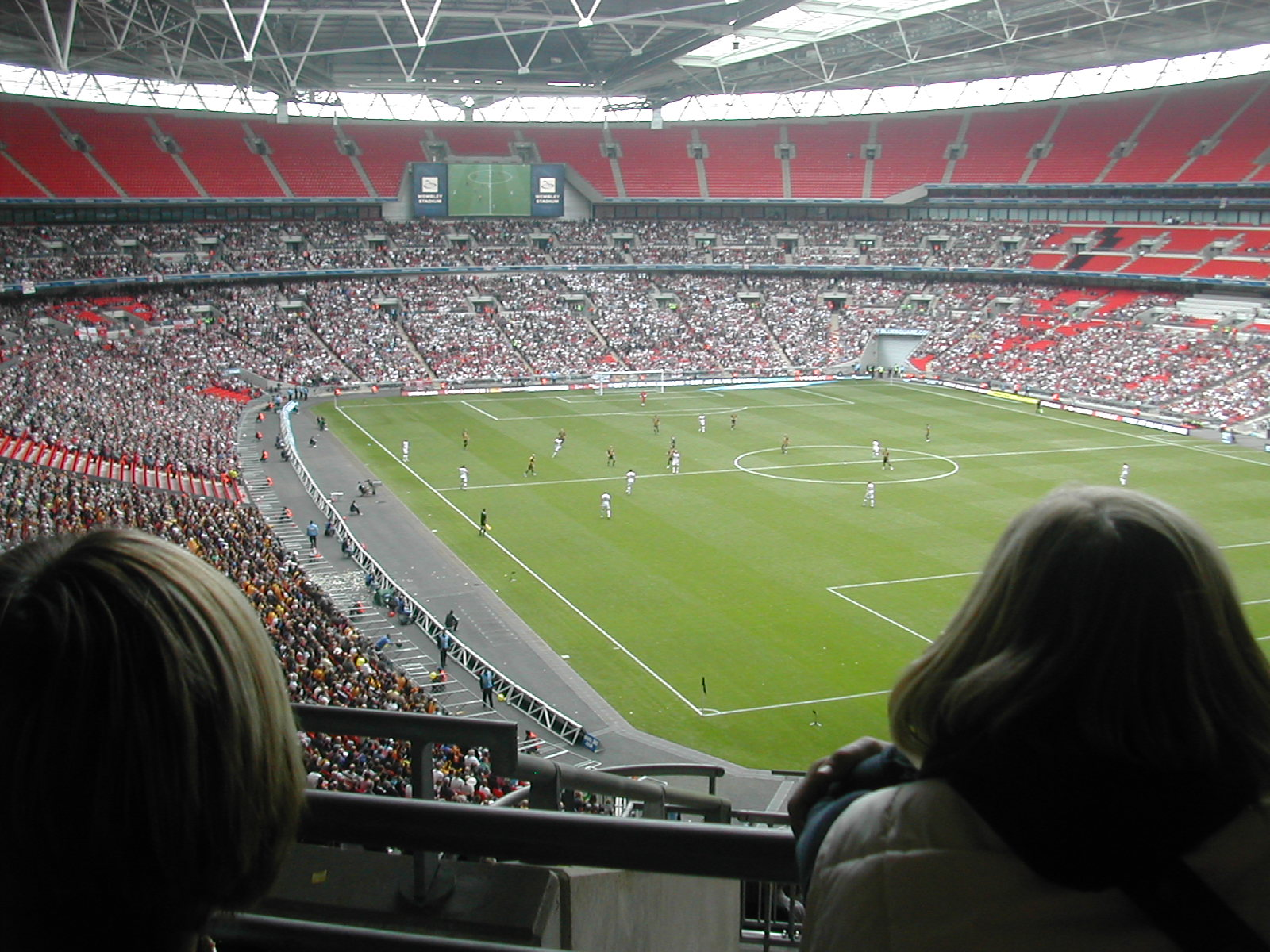
Cambridge playing Exeter City at Wembley Stadium

On the eve of the 2006–07 season, it was announced that former Norwich City striker Lee Power would be the club's new chairman taking over from Brian Attmore's interim reign. Jonny Hon was also to rejoin the board as vice-chairman after John Howard's resignation on conflict of interests grounds (owing to his ownership of Bideawhile 445 Ltd, United's landlords). Director Paul Barry also confirmed on 6 August 2006 that the club would break even for the forthcoming season after a fresh injection of funds following Howard's resignation. The team made an appalling start to the season, and Newman was sacked immediately after a 3–1 defeat by Exeter City. After speculation that Chris Wilder was leaving Halifax Town to take up the post, on 15 September 2006 the club announced Jimmy Quinn as the new manager, with Steve Castle as his assistant. In December 2006, the team suffered a humiliating 5–0 defeat to local rivals Histon in the FA Trophy, and subsequently suffered a run of six consecutive league defeats, which many supporters found unacceptable and led to calls for the manager's dismissal. A seven match unbeaten run gave renewed optimism, and although this was ended with two consecutive 5–0 defeats (against Altrincham and York City), the 7–0 demolition of Weymouth and the 4–2 victory over champions elect Dagenham & Redbridge, led to an atmosphere of positivity around the club. The U's ensured conference safety by winning five of their last seven conference games. A 1–0 away win at Aldershot on the penultimate Saturday of the 2006–07 season was followed up with another 1–0 win at home on the final day against Tamworth, ensuring the U's status for the 2007–08 season.

A strong start to 2007–08 saw Cambridge United establish themselves as one of the favourites for the Conference National title and promotion back to football league. Unfortunately Cambridge United missed out on the title to Aldershot Town who won the league and the sole automatic promotion place. Despite making it to the Conference play-off final, the U's were beaten 1–0 by Exeter City who subsequently took the second promotion place. The following season, United again finished runners-up, this time to Burton Albion and by only two points. Once again they made it to the play-off final, only to be beaten for the second year in succession – Torquay United running out 2–0 winners.

This came on the back of positive news off the field as a 26 March EGM allowed fresh investment in the club from current board members and American businessman Adrian Hanauer.

Four seasons of mid table mediocrity followed, before Cambridge United re-emerged as promotion contenders in the 2013–14 season, their second season under the management of Richard Money. They finished second in the Conference National and triumphed 2–1 over Gateshead in the playoff final to end their nine-year exile from the Football League. Money stayed for one more season at the Abbey Stadium, seeing Cambridge United take Manchester United to a replay in the third round of the FA Cup, before being succeeded as manager by Shaun Derry. The U's finished the league in 9th place with 68 points.

They finished 2016–17 season in 11th place, in a season that took in extended runs of both good and poor form. Derry was dismissed in February 2018 and was replaced on a permanent basis by his assistant, Joe Dunne, on the final day of 2017–18.

Cambridge started 2018–19 poorly, and manager Dunne was dismissed after 20 games with the club in 21st place. Colin Calderwood was appointed as his replacement in December 2018. Cambridge's second half under Calderwood was more successful, however, they could only finish in 21st place, only six points clear of the relegation zone. Following a successful start to the 2019–20 season, Calderwood was offered a new contract. However, after three heavy defeats in one month, Calderwood was sacked following a 4–0 defeat to Salford City. With the U's in 18th place, Calderwood's assistant manager Mark Bonner was placed in temporary charge until the end of the season. Under Bonner, Cambridge won four from their final seven matches before the disruption caused by the COVID-19 pandemic forced the cancellation of the season. Final league positions were decided on a points per game basis with Cambridge finishing in 16th place. This good form resulted in Bonner being handed the permanent role of head coach. During the 2020–21 season, Bonner guided Cambridge to promotion from League Two as runners-up after seven seasons in that division. Promotion was clinched on the final day with an emphatic 3–0 victory over Grimsby Town. Following this success, Bonner was handed a new three-year contract.

On 3 September 2022, a statement released by the club announced that investment from the clubs owners had allowed it to purchase the ground back from Grosvenor, thus ending a 20 year spell of being tenants at The Abbey, the club's home for 89 years.

== Seasons since 1970 ==
Cambridge United were elected to the Football League in 1970, since when they have celebrated seven promotions and suffered seven relegations. The following table shows each season since 1970 and includes seasons since they were relegated back to non-league football in 2005. Unless otherwise stated, all information is from the following source.

Season	Division	Won	Drawn	Lost	Points	League Pos	FA Cup	League Cup	Notes
1970–71	Division Four	15	13	18	43	20th	2nd round	1st round	First League season
1971–72	Division Four	17	14	15	48	10th	2nd round	1st round	
1972–73	Division Four	20	17	9	57	3rd	1st round	1st round	Promoted: 3rd of 24
1973–74	Division Three	13	9	24	35	21st	3rd round	2nd round	Relegated: 21st of 24
1974–75	Division Four	21	14	12	54	6th	3rd round	1st round	
1975–76	Division Four	14	15	17	43	13th	1st round	1st round	
1976–77	Division Four	26	13	7	65	1st	1st round	2nd round	Promoted: Champions
1977–78	Division Three	23	12	11	58	2nd	2nd round	1st round	Promoted: Runners-up
1978–79	Division Two	12	16	14	40	12th	1st round	1st round	
1979–80	Division Two	14	16	12	44	8th	4th round	2nd round	
1980–81	Division Two	17	6	19	40	13th	3rd round	4th round	
1981–82	Division Two	13	9	20	48	14th	3rd round	2nd round	New points system – 3 for a win
1982–83	Division Two	13	12	17	51	12th	5th round	2nd round	
1983–84	Division Two	4	12	26	24	22nd	3rd round	2nd round	Relegated: 22nd of 22
1984–85	Division Three	4	9	26	21	24th	1st round	1st round	Relegated: 24th of 24
1985–86	Division Four	15	9	22	54	22nd	1st round	1st round	Successful application for re-election
1986–87	Division Four	17	11	10	62	11th	2nd round	4th round	
1987–88	Division Four	16	13	17	61	15th	2nd round	2nd round	
1988–89	Division Four	18	12	14	68	8th	3rd round	1st round	
1989–90	Division Four	21	10	15	73	6th	QF	2nd round	Promoted: Playoffs
1990–91	Division Three	25	11	10	86	1st	QF	1st round	Promoted: Champions
1991–92	Division Two	19	17	10	74	5th	4th round	2nd round	Lost Playoffs v. Leicester
1993–94	Division Two	19	9	18	66	10th	2nd round	2nd round	
1994–95	Division Two	11	15	20	48	20th	3rd round	1st round	Relegated: 20th of 24
1995–96	Division Three	14	12	20	54	16th	1st round	1st round	
1996–97	Division Three	18	11	17	65	10th	2nd round	1st round	
1997–98	Division Three	14	18	14	60	16th	2nd round	1st round	
1998–99	Division Three	23	12	11	81	2nd	2nd round	3rd round	Promoted: Runners-up
1999–2000	Division Two	12	12	22	48	19th	5th round	1st round	
2000–01	Division Two	14	11	21	53	19th	2nd round	1st round	
2001–02	Division Two	7	13	26	34	24th	1st round	1st round	Relegated: 24th of 24
2002–03	Division Three	16	13	17	61	12th	3rd round	2nd round	
2003–04	Division Three	14	14	18	56	13th	2nd round	1st round	
2004–05	League Two	8	16	22	30	24th	2nd round	1st round	Relegated: 24th of 24
2005–06	Conference	15	10	17	55	12th	4th QR	Ineligible	
2006–07	Conference	15	10	21	55	17th	4th QR	Ineligible	
2007–08	Conference	25	11	10	86	2nd	3rd round	Ineligible	Lost play-off final v. Exeter
2008–09	Conference	24	14	8	86	2nd	1st round	Ineligible	Lost play-off final v. Torquay
2009–10	Conference	15	14	15	59	10th	2nd round	Ineligible	
2010–11	Conference	11	17	18	50	17th	1st round	Ineligible	
2011–12	Conference	19	14	13	71	9th	1st round	Ineligible	
2012–13	Conference	15	14	17	59	14th	4th QR	Ineligible	
2013–14	Conference	23	13	10	82	2nd	2nd round	Ineligible	Promoted: Won play-off final v. Gateshead

Updated to 4 May 2014

== Football League attendances ==
Cambridge United played their home games for their entire period in the Football League at the Abbey Stadium in Cambridge. The table below shows the high, low and average attendance for each season between inception in 1970 and relegation in 2005. Where the high attendance is above the capacity of the ground, this was possible due to terracing at the ground which meant the capacity was previously higher than the current figure of 9,617.

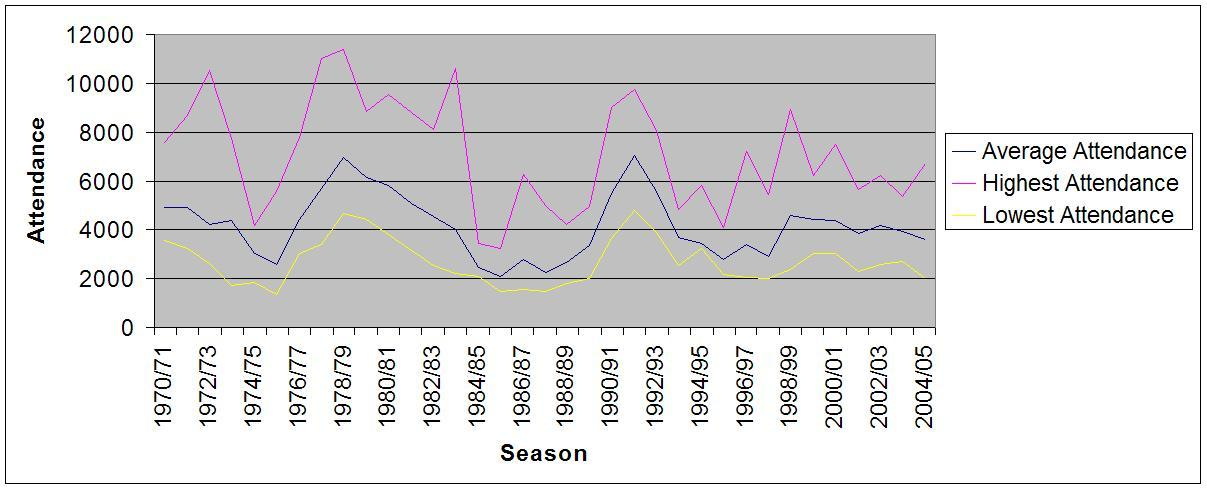

Data gathered from Soccerbase, and Official Website.

=== Notes ===
- The record attendance for a league match was 11,406 recorded against West Ham on 7 April 1979, although the record attendance at any Cambridge United game was 14,000 for a friendly against Chelsea in the 1970 pre-season
- Cambridge United's season high attendance has come against their fiercest rivals Peterborough United on nine occasions (seasons 1970–71, 1977–78, 1985–86, 1988–89, 1992–93, 1994–95, 1997–98, 2000–01 and 2001–02)

== See also ==
- List of Cambridge United F.C. managers
