= List of Cambridge United F.C. managers =

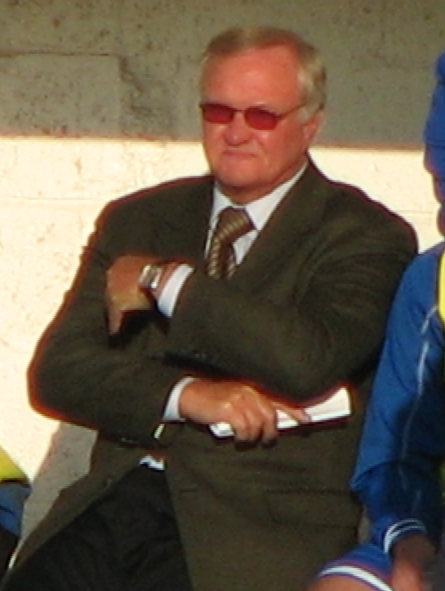

This is a list of Cambridge United managers since the 1970/71 season and the club's inception into the Football League. The club had 15 permanent managers as a League club until it was relegated to the Football Conference in 2005, as well as three who took the role on a caretaker basis. Only John Beck has held the role more than once, including a spell from 1990 to 1992 which is generally considered one of the most successful in the club's history.

The current manager of Cambridge United is Neil Harris.

== Managers since 1970 ==
This list includes all those who have managed the club since 1970, when the club joined the Football League for the first time, whether managing on a full-time or caretaker basis. Games played include all league and cup matches (if applicable), and the win percentage is calculated from the total of games.

Name	Nationality	Cambridge United career	Games	Won	Drawn	Lost	% won	Pts/game
Bill Leivers	England	1967–1974	201	71	56	74	35.3	1.34
Ron Atkinson	England	1974–1978	146	68	42	36	46.6	1.68
John Docherty	Scotland	1978–1983	251	83	69	99	33.0	1.27
John Cozens (caretaker)	England	1983–1984	6	0	3	3	0.0	0.50
John Ryan	England	1984–1985	45	6	10	29	13.3	0.62
Ken Shellito	England	1985	45	8	9	28	17.8	0.73
Christopher Turner	England	1986–1990	208	79	54	75	37.9	1.40
John Beck	England	1990–1992	159	75	46	38	47.2	1.70
Gary Johnson (caretaker)	England	1992	0	0	0	0	n/a	n/a
Ian Atkins	England	1992–1993	29	7	10	12	24.1	1.07
Gary Johnson	England	1993–1995	136	41	38	57	30.4	1.19
Tommy Taylor	England	1995–1996	74	28	17	29	37.8	1.36
Roy McFarland	England	1996–2001	232	77	68	87	33.2	1.29
John Beck	England	2001	36	9	12	15	25.0	1.08
John Taylor	England	2001–2004	135	41	37	57	30.4	1.19
Dale Brooks (caretaker)	England	2004	1	0	0	1	0.0	0.00
Claude Le Roy	France	2004	8	4	3	1	50.0	1.88
Hervé Renard	France	2004	25	4	7	14	16.0	0.76
Ricky Duncan (caretaker)	England	2004	1	0	1	0	0.0	1.00
Steve Thompson	England	2004–2005	23	5	8	10	21.7	1.00
Rob Newman	England	2005–2006	53	17	11	25	32.0	1.17
Lee Power (caretaker)	England	2006	3	1	2	0	33.3	1.67
Jimmy Quinn	Northern Ireland	2006–2008	96	44	20	32	45.8	1.58
Gary Brabin	England	2008–2009	54	27	14	13	50.0	1.76
Paul Carden (caretaker)	England	2009	2	1	0	1	50.0	1.50
Martin Ling	England	2009–2011	87	28	28	31	32.1	1.29
Jez George	England	2011–2012	83	29	27	27	34.9	1.37
Richard Money	England	2012–2015	170	67	45	58	39.4	1.45
Joe Dunne (caretaker)	Ireland	2015	1	1	0	0	100.0	3.00
Shaun Derry	England	2015–2018	124	48	29	47	38.7	1.40
Joe Dunne	Ireland	2018	40	14	8	18	35.0	1.25
Mark Bonner (caretaker)	England	2018	3	0	2	1	0.0	0.67
Colin Calderwood	Scotland	2018–2020	61	15	17	29	24.6	1.02
Mark Bonner	England	2020–2023	201	77	43	81	38.3	1.36
Barry Corr (caretaker)	Ireland	2023	1	1	0	0	100	3.00
Neil Harris	England	2023–2024	14	5	3	6	35.7	1.29
Barry Corr (caretaker)	Ireland	2024	3	0	0	3	0.0	0.00
Garry Monk	England	2024–	11	2	4	5	18.2	0.91

== Earlier Managers ==
The above table lists managers since Cambridge United's election to the Football League, however the club existed for some 58 years before 1970. Some of the managers that took charge of Cambridge in this earlier period between the end of the Second World War and 1970 include:

- Roy Kirk (1964–1966)
- Alan Moore (1960–1963)
- Bill Craig (1959–1960)
- Bert Johnson (1955–1959)
- Gerald Williams (1955)
- Bill Whittaker (1949–1955)

== Assistant Managers ==
Many people have taken the role of assistant manager at Cambridge United in its long history. These include, in recent times: John Cozens, Malcolm Webster, John Beck, Gary Johnson, Brian Owen, Tommy Taylor, Paul Clark, Danny O'Shea, David Preece, Shane Westley, Rob Newman, Tony Spearing, Steve Castle, Alan Lewer, Willy Wordsworth, Paul Carden and Nolan Keeley. The club's current assistants are Barry Corr and Kevin Betsy.

== See also ==
- History of Cambridge United F.C.
