= Rob Miller (footballer) =

English footballer

Personal information
- Full name: Robert Miller
- Date of birth: 28 March 1980 (age 46)
- Place of birth: Bedford, England
- Position: Defender

Senior career*
Years	Team	Apps	(Gls)
1998–1999	Coventry City	0	(0)
1999	Cambridge United	1	(0)
1999–2002	Stevenage Borough	39	(1)
2002	Bedford Town		
- * Club domestic league appearances and goals

Robert Miller (born 28 March 1980) is an English footballer who played in The Football League for Cambridge United. His only appearance for Cambridge came in a 2–1 defeat away at Millwall during the 1999–2000 season.
