= Lamey =

Lamey is a surname. Notable people with the surname include:

- Kevin Lamey, Jamaican footballer
- Michael Lamey, Dutch footballer
- Bob Lamey, American sportscaster
- Hubertus Lamey (1896-1981), German military general
- Terry Lamey, Australian Rugby player
- Nathan Lamey, English footballer
