= Tommy Jaszczun =

English footballer (born 1977)

Personal information
- Full name: Antony John Jaszczun
- Date of birth: 16 September 1977 (age 49)
- Place of birth: Kettering, England
- Height: 5 ft 10 in (1.78 m)
- Position: Defender

Youth career
- ?–1998: Aston Villa

Senior career*
Years	Team	Apps	(Gls)
1998–2000	Aston Villa	0	(0)
2000–2004	Blackpool	122	(0)
2004–2005	Northampton Town	32	(0)
2005–2006	Rochdale	17	(0)
2006	→ Cambridge United (loan)	16	(0)
2006–2007	Cambridge United	10	(1)
2007–2009	Kettering Town		
2009–2010	Corby Town		
2010	Kettering Town	1	(0)
2011	Corby Town	7	(1)
2012	Daventry United		
2012–2013	Brackley Town		
2012–2016	Wellingborough Whitworth		

Managerial career
- 2015–2016: Wellingborough Whitworth
- * Club domestic league appearances and goals as of 00:56, 15 March 2017 (UTC)

Antony John "Tommy" Jaszczun (born 16 September 1977) is an English former professional footballer who played as a defender.

== Career ==
=== Aston Villa ===
Born in Kettering, Northamptonshire, Jaszczun started his career as part of the Aston Villa youth team. He rarely managed to get into the first team setup, playing just once as a substitute in a League Cup tie with Chelsea, and was sold on to Blackpool for a fee believed to be £50,000.

=== Blackpool ===
Whilst at Blackpool he helped them win the Football League Trophy twice, starting both finals, in 2002 and 2004.

=== Cambridge United ===
Following a loan spell, Jaszczun joined Cambridge United in July 2006. However he was forced into retirement in March 2007 as he had been sidelined since November with a toe injury and has been unable to return to training despite an operation and prolonged rehabilitation.

=== Kettering Town ===
Jaszczun came out of early retirement to play for his hometown side, Kettering Town. He was manager Mark Cooper first signing in May 2007. However, after a successful first season, winning the Conference North, he had an injury plagued season the next, but still managed to feature against Fulham in the FA Cup. Jaszczun was released by the club in March 2009.

=== Corby Town ===
Following his release from Kettering Town, Jaszczun joined Conference North side Corby Town.

=== Kettering Town again ===
Jaszczun rejoined The Poppies for a second spell in May 2010 as a player coach. After just six months Jaszczun quit the club after he was asked to take a wage cut.

=== Corby Town again ===
On 17 January 2011, it was confirmed that Jaszczun had rejoined The Steelmen.

=== Whitworth ===
In 2012 Jaszczun joined United Counties League side Wellingborough Whitworth as player/assistant manager. In January 2016 he became manager, but resigned at the end of the 2015–16 season.

== Honours ==
Blackpool

- Football League Trophy: 2001–02, 2003–04
