= Stevland =

Stevland is a masculine given name. Notable people with this name include:

- Stevland Angus (born 1980), English footballer
- Stevland Hardaway Morris (born 1950), real name of American musician Stevie Wonder
