= Geoff Hallas =

English footballer (1930–1982)

Personal information
- Date of birth: 8 February 1930
- Place of birth: Lydgate, Lancashire, England
- Date of death: 6 June 1982 (aged 52)
- Place of death: Oldham, Greater Manchester, England
- Position: Full-back

Senior career*
Years	Team	Apps	(Gls)
- Droylsden
1949–1950	Mossley		
–1954	Warminster Town		
1954–1955	West Ham United	3	(0)
- * Club domestic league appearances and goals

Geoff Hallas (8 February 1930 – 6 June 1982) was an English footballer who played as a full-back in the Football League for West Ham United.

His career started with Droylsden and Mossley for whom he played four games in the 1949–50 season, before he went to undertake his national service.

After completing his national service he played for Warminster Town before signing for Second Division club West Ham in March 1954. He made four appearances for the club: three in the League and one in the Essex Professional Cup during the 1954–55 season.

Hallas suffered a head injury during a reserve team match against Charlton Athletic early in the 1955–56 season, which affected his sight. He thereafter retired from football on doctors advice.

The club awarded Hallas a testimonial match, jointly with Brian Moore, who had also seen his professional career cut short through injury that season. The match featured a number of big names in the All Star XI team, such as Jimmy Scoular, Cliff Holton, Roy Paul and Trevor Ford, and also included former West Ham players Harry Hooper and Eric Parsons. His benefit received from the match totalled £991 11s 3d from gate receipts and £15 0s 3d from donations.
