= Phil Barnes =

English footballer (born 1979)

Personal information
- Full name: Philip Kenneth Barnes
- Date of birth: 2 March 1979 (age 47)
- Place of birth: Sheffield, England
- Position: Goalkeeper

Youth career
- –1996: Rotherham United

Senior career*
Years	Team	Apps	(Gls)
1996–1997	Rotherham United	2	(0)
1997–2004	Blackpool	141	(0)
2004–2006	Sheffield United	1	(0)
2005	→ Torquay United (loan)	5	(0)
2006	→ Queens Park Rangers (loan)	1	(0)
2006–2009	Grimsby Town	120	(0)
2009–2012	Gainsborough Trinity	73	(0)
2012–2013	Alfreton Town	18	(0)
2013–2014	Gainsborough Trinity	41	(0)
2014–2015	Harrogate Town	36	(0)
2015–2016	Buxton	25	(0)
2016	Matlock Town	14	(0)
2017–2018	Matlock Town	41	(0)
2018–2019	Handsworth Parramore	32	(0)
Total		550	(0)
- * Club domestic league appearances and goals as of 16:58, 19 March 2014 (UTC)

Philip Kenneth Barnes (born 2 March 1979) is an English former professional footballer who played as a goalkeeper.

Barnes was active between 1996 and 2019, spending his first thirteen seasons in professional football in a career that began at Rotherham United, although he first made a name for himself as Blackpool. He notched up 141 league appearances during his spell with the Tangerines which earned him a move to Sheffield United, spending time on loan with Torquay United and Queens Park Rangers before joining Grimsby Town. He departed The Mariners in 2009 and moved into Non-League football, playing for Gainsborough Trinity, Alfreton Town, Harrogate Town, Buxton, Matlock Town and Handsworth Parramore. He retired from competitive football at the end of the 2018−19 season.

== Career ==
=== Rotherham United ===
Barnes started his career at Rotherham United, making his debut against York City in April 1997. He made two appearances for Rotherham in total.

=== Blackpool ===
Barnes then made a move to Blackpool in August 1997 for a fee of £100,000, as cover for Steve Banks, but eventually made the position his own. Following Blackpool's relegation to the Third Division in May 2000, Barnes signed a three-year contract keeping him at the club until the end of the 2002–03 season. He contributed a number of clean sheets to the Bloomfield Road club's promotion campaign, helping them to promotion to Division Two via the play-offs in May 2001. After losing his place in the first team, Barnes requested a transfer in November 2003. Having made 170 appearances in all competitions for Blackpool he left the club. In 2002 he started the final as Blackpool won the 2001–02 Football League Trophy. In 2004 Blackpool won the Football League Trophy again, but this time he was an unused substitute in the final.

=== Sheffield United ===
He then joined Sheffield United on a free transfer in July 2004, signing a one-year contract, as cover for Paddy Kenny. A regular for the reserves but making just five first-team appearances, he also went out on loan spells at Torquay United and Queens Park Rangers. Barnes was part of the United squad that earned promotion to the Premier League in the 2005–06 campaign.

=== Grimsby Town ===
In June 2006, Barnes signed a three-year contract with Grimsby Town for an undisclosed fee, to replace Steve Mildenhall after his transfer to Yeovil Town. He was named the Grimsby Supporters' Player of the Year for 2007–08. At the end of the 2007–08 season, Barnes had made over 100 appearances in all competitions for Grimsby. Barnes started the 2008–09 season by being in the League Two Team of the Week, then he was in the team of the week again for his performance against Shrewsbury Town. Later in the season after getting a throat infection Mariners manager Mike Newell was forced to replace Barnes, and in turn swooped to sign on loan Preston North End keeper Wayne Henderson to replace him. Barnes was then made available for loan, and on 24 March, Newell rejected a loan move from Shrewsbury Town for him after the two clubs could not agree on a deal regarding wages. On 25 March, Barnes left Grimsby after being told he was no longer needed by the club, his understudy Gary Montgomery was also released. The Mariners saw out the 2008–09 campaign with Henderson and former Leeds United player Jonny Lund, as the club's two professional keepers.

=== Non-League ===
Barnes joined Conference North club Gainsborough Trinity on a non-contract terms in April 2009 after the club needed an emergency goalkeeper to cover for the injured Adam Sollitt, making his debut in the final game of the 2008–09 season, a 3–2 victory over Harrogate Town. Trinity manager Steve Charles praised Barnes as he was given Man of the Match in the game, but commented signing Barnes for the 2009–10 season was unlikely due to the players desire to play at a professional level. Despite this though, Barnes signed a permanent contract for the club on 9 June 2009 as well as the club signing Darryn Stamp on the same day. Barnes was joined at Trinity by a vast number of professionals as new chairman Peter Swann boosted the club's finances to sign a higher calibre of players. Barnes would start the 2009–10 season off as the club's number 1 keeper. The Holy Blues appointed Brian Little as manager who in turn brought in former Premiership keeper Gavin Ward as his Assistant Manager and second choice keeper.

During the 2011–12 campaign a mid season injury sidelined Barnes for the remainder of the season. His understudy Andy Pettinger was also forced on to the sidelines, with the club having to bring in Dimitar Evtimov from Nottingham Forest on loan before signing youngster Michael Emery to deputise. Before the end of the season Trinity brought in a new first choice keeper in Jason White meaning Barnes was not offered a new contract at the end of the 2011–12 season but instead was invited back to pre-season training to prove his fitness, however he declined the offer and left the club.

It was announced on 28 June 2012, that Barnes had joined Conference National side Alfreton Town. Initially used as Town's first choice keeper, the club chose to loan in Jon Stewart from Burnley, however when Stewart's loan expired in late December, Barnes regained the number 1 spot. Barnes played 18 times for the club and was released at the end of the season. On 23 May 2013 it was announced Barnes had re-signed for Gainsborough.

On 27 May 2014, Barnes joined Harrogate Town on a one-year deal. In August 2015, Barnes signed a contract with Buxton. In June 2016 Barnes joined Matlock Town before retiring a few months later in September 2016. Barnes came out of retirement and rejoined Town ahead of the 2017–18 season. In July 2018 Barnes signed with Handsworth Parramore.

== Personal life ==
Barnes now works as Performer for Handsworth Precision Tools.

== Honours ==
Blackpool

- Football League Third Division play-offs: 2001
- Football League Trophy: 2001–02, 2003–04

Sheffield United

- Football League Championship second-place promotion: 2005–06

Grimsby Town

- Football League Trophy runner-up: 2007–08

Individual

- Grimsby Town Supporters' Player of the Year: 2008
