= Brian Moore (footballer, born 1933) =

Northern Irish footballer (1933–2006)

- Moore at West Ham United

Personal information
- Full name: Brian McGowan Moore
- Date of birth: 29 December 1933
- Place of birth: Belfast, Northern Ireland
- Date of death: 8 September 2006 (aged 72)
- Place of death: Cambridge, England
- Position: Inside forward

Youth career
- Glentoran

Senior career*
Years	Team	Apps	(Gls)
1953–1955	Distillery		
1955	West Ham United	9	(1)
1956–1960	Cambridge United	119	(80)
1960–	Cambridge City		
- Wisbech Town
- Boston United
- Newmarket Town
- * Club domestic league appearances and goals

Brian McGowan Moore (29 December 1933 – 8 September 2006) was an association football player from Northern Ireland who played as an inside forward in the Football League for West Ham United.

== Career ==
Born in Belfast, Moore began his career at Glentoran and had been a youth international. He joined Distillery in August 1953. He earned one representative cap with the Irish League XI, against the Football League XI at Anfield on 20 October 1954. He moved to England and joined Second Division club West Ham United in February 1955. West Ham paid a fee of £3000 and also agreed to play home and away friendly fixtures against the Belfast club.

After making his debut in a friendly against Austrian club Simmering on 19 February 1955, a match that the Hammers won 8–2, Moore was involved in the first match to be televised live from Upton Park, in another friendly against Rotterdam side Holland Sports Club on 22 March. The match against Distillery in Belfast, on 28 March, represented the first time West Ham had travelled to Northern Ireland. Moore was made captain for the game, which ended 2–2. In the return fixture at Upton Park, Moore scored in a 7–5 victory for West Ham.

Moore made his League debut on the final day of the 1954–55 season, a 1–1 draw against Nottingham Forest on 2 May 1955. He then made nine League appearances for West Ham during the 1955–56 season and also played in the finals of the Essex Professional Cup and London Challenge Cup, before an injury ended his professional career. His final match came against Middlesbrough on 26 December 1955, three days before his 22nd birthday. Moore was hit in the face with the ball, leaving him virtually blind in one eye.

The club awarded Moore a testimonial match, jointly with Geoff Hallas, who had also seen his career cut short through injury earlier in the season. The match featured a number of big names in the All Star XI team, such as Jimmy Scoular, Cliff Holton, Roy Paul and Trevor Ford, and also included former West Ham players Harry Hooper and Eric Parsons. Proceeds for the match were due to be halved between the two players, totalling £991 11s 3d from gate receipts and £15 0s 3d from donations for each player. However, a dispute between Moore and his former club, due to his subsequent registration with Cambridge United, meant that he received only £500.

After leaving West Ham, Moore played for Eastern Counties League club Cambridge United, making his debut on 10 November 1956. The 1957–58 season saw him switch to outside right and he scored a club record 68 goals, 49 in the league. He was later made club captain, but after a disagreement with incoming player-manager Alan Moore, he left in 1960 to join Cambridge City.

At City, Moore's 19 goals helped the club to the Southern Premier League title in 1962–63. He scored 34 in all competitions that season. He totalled 107 goals for the Lilywhites before leaving for Wisbech Town, where he was part of the team that suffered a 10–1 defeat at the hands of Brighton and Hove Albion in an FA Cup game in 1956.

Moore later played for Boston United and Newmarket Town. After which, he worked for Cambridge-based electrical company Pye Ltd. and managed their football team. He died of cancer in September 2006.
