= John Murphy (footballer, born 1976) =

English footballer

Personal information
- Full name: John James Murphy
- Date of birth: 18 October 1976 (age 50)
- Place of birth: St Helens, England
- Height: 6 ft 1 in (1.85 m)
- Position: Striker

Senior career*
Years	Team	Apps	(Gls)
1995–1999	Chester City	103	(20)
1999–2006	Blackpool	229	(83)
2006–2007	Macclesfield Town	23	(5)
2007–2008	Chester City	39	(9)
2008–2009	St Patrick's Athletic	1	(0)
Total		395	(117)
- * Club domestic league appearances and goals

John Murphy (born 18 October 1976) is an English former professional footballer who became a coach.

He had two spells with Chester City, having left first time round to join Blackpool in 1999. He came through the youth ranks with Chester and made his first-team debut in 1994–95. He remained with the club until the eve of the 1999–2000 season, when he moved up to Division Two by joining Blackpool, where he enjoyed a long and successful seven-year stint that included three victories at the Millennium Stadium. Two of these were winning Football League Trophy finals; he started and scored in both finals in 2002 and 2004.

Murphy rejoined Chester from Cheshire neighbours Macclesfield Town, whom he joined from Blackpool in January 2007 after making a loan move permanent. On 6 January 2007, during his loan spell, Murphy scored Macclesfield's goal in their 6–1 FA Cup Third round defeat against Chelsea at Stamford Bridge to briefly bring the tie level.

He rejoined Chester on 29 June 2007. His first league game back at the club saw Murphy feature in the starting line-up in the goalless draw with Chesterfield on 11 August 2007, with his first two goals back at the club coming in a 4–0 demolition of Dagenham & Redbridge a fortnight later. Almost inevitably, he scored on his return to Macclesfield in a 2–1 win for Chester on 29 September 2007.

Murphy signed for St Patrick's Athletic on 31 July 2008 for an undisclosed fee. After an injury-plagued spell at the club, which restricted him to one substitute league appearance, he was released on 4 February 2009.

In August 2011, Murphy became a coach at Blackpool. He left the role, citing personal reasons, in June 2022.

== Honours ==
Blackpool

- Football League Third Division play-offs: 2001
- Football League Trophy: 2001–02, 2003–04
