= James Pullen =

English footballer

Personal information
- Full name: James Daniel Pullen
- Date of birth: 18 March 1982 (age 44)
- Place of birth: Chelmsford, England
- Height: 6 ft 2 in (1.88 m)
- Position: Goalkeeper

Senior career*
Years	Team	Apps	(Gls)
1999	Heybridge Swifts	0	(0)
1999–2003	Ipswich Town	2	(0)
2001–2002	→ Blackpool (loan)	16	(0)
2003	→ Dagenham & Redbridge (loan)	9	(0)
2003–2004	Peterborough United	3	(0)
2004	→ Heybridge Swifts (loan)	0	(0)
2004	→ Hornchurch (loan)	0	(0)
2004–2005	Gravesend & Northfleet	17	(0)
2008–2010	AFC Wimbledon	68	(0)
2010–2011	Chelmsford City	29	(0)
2011	Woking	0	(0)
Total		117	(0)
- * Club domestic league appearances and goals

James Daniel Pullen (born 18 March 1982) is an English former professional footballer who played as a goalkeeper.

== Career ==
Born in Chelmsford, Pullen started his career at Heybridge Swifts. On 29 September 1999 he joined Ipswich Town on a free transfer. He made his debut in a 3–1 win against Middlesbrough in the Football League Cup on 6 November 2002.

On 11 August 2001, he moved on loan to Blackpool. He made his debut in a 2–1 win against Oldham Athletic in the Football League One on 8 September 2001. Pullen saved a last-minute penalty against Swindon Town on 10 November 2001, Danny Invincible having taken the penalty. He was an unused substitute for the final as Blackpool won the 2001–02 Football League Trophy. He played his last match for Blackpool in a 3–0 win over Wrexham in the Football League One on 1 April 2002.

On 4 August 2003, he joined Dagenham & Redbridge on a three-month loan. He made his debut in a 2–1 loss against Leigh Genesis in the Football Conference on 9 August 2003. He was sent off against Margate in the Conference on 7 October 2003, and played his last match for Dagenham & Redbridge in a 2–0 loss against Burton Albion in the Conference on 18 October 2003.

On 3 November 2003, he joined Peterborough United on a one-month loan. He made his debut in a 2–1 win against Wycombe Wanderers in the League One on 29 November 2003. He played his last match for Peterborough in a 2–1 loss against Chesterfield in the League One on 26 December 2003.

On 27 February 2004, he moved on loan to Heybridge Swifts, and then on 1 November 2004 he moved on loan to Hornchurch.

On 15 November 2004, he joined Gravesend & Northfleet on an 18-month contract. He made his debut in a 2–2 draw against Farnborough Town in the Conference on 7 December 2004. He played his last match for Gravesend & Northfleet in a 0–2 loss against Burton Albion in the Conference on 23 April 2005.

On 1 August 2008, after spells with Fisher Athletic and Eastleigh, he joined AFC Wimbledon. After over forty appearances, he was released on 26 April 2010. Subsequently, Pullen signed for hometown club Chelmsford City.

On 28 March 2011, Pullen signed with Conference South side Woking, until the end of the season, after his release from Chelmsford City. At the end of the season he retired.

== Honours ==
Blackpool

- Football League Trophy: 2001–02
