= John Hansen (footballer, born 1973) =

Danish footballer

Personal information
- Date of birth: 14 September 1973 (age 53)
- Place of birth: Denmark
- Position: Midfielder

Senior career*
Years	Team	Apps	(Gls)
1996–1998	OB	35	(5)
1998–1999	Esbjerg fB	6	(0)
2000–2001	Cambridge United	28	(3)
2001–2002	Esbjerg fB	3	(1)
- * Club domestic league appearances and goals

John Hansen (born 14 September 1973) is a Danish former professional footballer who played as a midfielder for OB, Esbjerg fB and Cambridge United.
