= Daniel Chillingworth =

English footballer

Personal information
- Full name: Daniel Thomas Chillingworth
- Date of birth: 13 September 1981 (age 45)
- Place of birth: Cambridge, England
- Height: 6 ft 0 in (1.83 m)
- Position: Striker

Youth career
- ?–2000: Cambridge United

Senior career*
Years	Team	Apps	(Gls)
2000–2005	Cambridge United	87	(13)
2001	→ Cambridge City (loan)	?	(?)
2001	→ Darlington (loan)	4	(1)
2004–2005	→ Leyton Orient (loan)	8	(2)
2005–2007	Rushden & Diamonds	22	(2)
2006	→ Notts County (loan)	13	(2)
2007–2008	Cambridge United	16	(5)
2007	→ St Albans City (loan)	1	(0)
2009	St Albans City	7	(1)
2010	St Neots Town	3	(1)
- * Club domestic league appearances and goals as of 15:21, 24 March 2014 (UTC)

Daniel Thomas Chillingworth (born 13 September 1981) is an English former footballer.
