= Shaun Marshall =

English footballer

Personal information
- Date of birth: 3 October 1978 (age 48)
- Place of birth: Fakenham, England
- Height: 6 ft 1 in (1.85 m)
- Position: Goalkeeper

Team information
- Current team: Dereham Town

Senior career*
Years	Team	Apps	(Gls)
1996–2005	Cambridge United	155	(0)
2005	→Stevenage Borough (loan)	5	(0)
2005–2006	Notts County	1	(0)
2006–2007	King's Lynn	?	(0)
2007–	Dereham Town	136	(0)
- * Club domestic league appearances and goals as of 22:19, 26 November 2007 (UTC)

Shaun Marshall (born 3 October 1978 in Fakenham, England) is a professional footballer playing with Eastern Counties League Premier Division side Dereham Town, where he plays as a goalkeeper.

Marshall started his career at Cambridge United where he made over 150 appearances. He has also played for Stevenage Borough and Notts County. He was released by King's Lynn at the end of the 2006–07 season.

== Honours ==
Cambridge United

- Football League Trophy runner-up: 2001–02
