= Paul Wanless =

English footballer (born 1973)

Personal information
- Full name: Paul Steven Wanless
- Date of birth: 14 December 1973 (age 52)
- Place of birth: Banbury, England
- Height: 6 ft 1 in (1.85 m)
- Position: Midfielder

Youth career
- Oxford United

Senior career*
Years	Team	Apps	(Gls)
1991–1995	Oxford United	32	(0)
1995–1996	Lincoln City	8	
1996	Woking (loan)	0	
1996–2003	Cambridge United	285	(50)
2003–2005	Oxford United	65	(10)
2005–2007	Forest Green Rovers	38	(10)
2007–2009	Llanelli	7	(0)
2010–	Oxford City	0	(0)

Managerial career
- 2007: Forest Green Rovers (caretaker)
- * Club domestic league appearances and goals

Paul Steven Wanless (born 14 December 1973) is an English former professional footballer who played in the Football League as a midfielder for Oxford United, Lincoln City and Cambridge United.

== Playing career ==
Wanless was born in Banbury. He began his career as a trainee at Oxford United, coming through the ranks to make a handful of first team appearances before moving to Lincoln City in 1995 on a free transfer. His chances with Lincoln were limited and he spent some time out on loan at non-league side Woking.

Wanless then left Lincoln and moved to Cambridge United, where he made nearly 350 appearances in all competitions over a seven-year period and became club captain. A return to his first club, Oxford United, in 2003 saw him make more than 60 appearances in his last spell in the Football League.

In 2005 Wanless then moved to Conference National side Forest Green Rovers where he was a pivotal part of Rovers' successful relegation battle, finishing the season as top scorer despite playing in midfield. As a result, he was voted supporters' player of the year.

Wanless joined Southern Football League Premier Division side Oxford City as a player coach in June 2010.

== Managerial career ==
Wanless had a short spell as caretaker manager of Forest Green in 2007 when Gary Owers left the club, during which he took control of two matches, both drawn. After spending a season as assistant to the new manager, Jim Harvey, he left Forest Green in May 2007 and moved to the Welsh Premier League as player-coach at Llanelli. He was then made assistant manager, and coached the side in the Uefa Champions League in a qualifying match against the Latvian champions, FK Ventspils, but left the club after two years when manager Andy Legg appointed Steve Jenkins as his assistant.

== Honours ==
Cambridge United

- Football League Trophy runner-up: 2001–02
- Football League Third Division second-place promotion: 1998–99
