= Lionel Perez (footballer) =

French footballer (born 1967)

Personal information
- Full name: Lionel Pierre Antoine Perez
- Date of birth: 24 April 1967 (age 59)
- Place of birth: Bagnols-sur-Cèze, Gard, France
- Height: 1.83 m (6 ft 0 in)
- Position: Goalkeeper

Senior career*
| Years | Team | Apps | (Gls) |
| 1989–1993 | Nîmes | 111 | (0) |
| 1993–1996 | Bordeaux | 16 | (0) |
| 1995–1996 | → Laval (loan) | 42 | (0) |
| 1996–1998 | Sunderland | 75 | (0) |
| 1998–2000 | Newcastle United | 0 | (0) |
| 1999 | → Scunthorpe United (loan) | 13 | (0) |
| 2000 | → Cambridge United (loan) | 9 | (0) |
| 2000–2002 | Cambridge United | 78 | (0) |
| 2002–2003 | Enfield | 66 | (0) |
| 2003 | Chelmsford City | 0 | (0) |
| 2003–2004 | Stevenage Borough | 31 | (0) |
| Total | | 375 | (0) |
- * Club domestic league appearances and goals

Lionel Pierre Antoine Perez (born 24 April 1967) is a French former professional footballer who played as a goalkeeper.

== Playing career ==
=== France ===
Perez was born in Bagnols-sur-Cèze, Gard. His football career started with French club, Bordeaux. However, much of this time was spent out on loan with Nîmes Olympique then Stade Lavallois.

=== Sunderland ===
Perez made his Sunderland debut, aged 29 on 19 October 1996, as a substitute for Tony Coton, in a 3–0 away defeat against Southampton. Perez won Sunderland's Player of the Year Award for the 1996–97 season.

During his time at Sunderland, Perez was famously chipped by his former Nimes team-mate Eric Cantona from 25-yards out in a 5–0 defeat away to Manchester United in December 1996. The goal is also memorable due to Cantona's celebration. Cantona later admitted his celebration was intended to humiliate Lionel because Perez refused to shake Cantona's hand before the game – Cantona stated that in his celebration he wanted Perez to "be able to see him from every possible angle."

Perez's final game for Sunderland was in the 1998 Football League First Division play-off final at Wembley Stadium against Charlton Athletic. Sunderland drew 4–4 with Clive Mendonca scoring a hat-trick for Charlton; Perez failed to save a penalty in the resulting shoot-out which Charlton won 7–6 which saw The Addicks promoted to the Premier League. Perez stated that the defeat was the worst moment of his career.

After being released by Sunderland at the end of the 1997–98 season, Perez signed for the club's arch-rivals Newcastle United on a free transfer.

=== Newcastle United ===
At Newcastle United, Perez was fourth-choice behind Steve Harper, Shay Given and John Karelse; he never made a competitive start for the Magpies and after being loaned to various clubs throughout his 21-month spell on Tyneside. Perez later stated that he regretted joining Newcastle saying: "It was the worst move in my life. The fans in Newcastle won't be very happy but they don't like me and I don't like them. It was like a bad move for them, for me. I took the money and I am not ashamed about that, if I was to do it again I would take more."

=== Cambridge United ===
While on loan with Cambridge, Perez kept four clean sheets in his first five games with Cambridge and helped the club to avoid relegation before signing permanently in July 2000. It was reported in the media that Perez took a 95% pay cut to join Cambridge. However, in an interview in 2021, Perez stated that while he did take a significant pay cut – the reported figure of 95% was not true.

He won Cambridge's player of the season award in his final season with The U's. On his final appearance with Cambridge, Perez took a penalty against Tranmere Rovers – however, his spot-kick was saved and his opposing goalkeeper Joe Murphy injured himself saving it and was substituted as a result.

In July 2022, Perez was inducted into Cambridge United's Hall of Fame. His Cambridge manager Roy McFarland said that Perez was "the best signing" he ever made.

=== Later career ===
Perez was released by Cambridge at the end of the 2002–03 season and joined non-league side Enfield in October 2002, and then Stevenage Borough in February 2003, after a short stint at Chelmsford City. He was a regular for Stevenage until in March 2004 (being voted Player of the Year), he broke his leg playing in a league match against Barnet. Perez was forced to retire at the end of the season, and he immediately took up a coaching role at the club. Perez left his coaching role at the club in April 2006.

== Coaching career ==
On leaving his coaching role with Stevenage in 2006, Perez and his family moved back to France where he had spells coaching at FC PHA Chusclan Laudun and SO Cassis Carnoux. He holds a UEFA B Licence. He has been inactive in football since 2010. In an interview in May 2021, Perez stated that he was working in a factory in his hometown Bagnols-sur-Cèze saying "I spent all my money and I need to pay the bills and raise my kids."

== Honours ==
Cambridge United

- Football League Trophy runner-up: 2001–02
