= Tom Youngs (footballer, born 1979) =

English footballer and manager (1979–2025)

Personal information
- Full name: Thomas Anthony John Youngs
- Date of birth: 31 August 1979
- Place of birth: Bury St Edmunds, Suffolk, England
- Date of death: 4 May 2025 (aged 45)
- Place of death: Bury St Edmunds, Suffolk, England
- Height: 5 ft 8 in (1.73 m)
- Position: Forward

Youth career
- 1989–1997: Cambridge United

Senior career*
| Years | Team | Apps | (Gls) |
| 1997–2003 | Cambridge United | 151 | (43) |
| 2003–2005 | Northampton Town | 26 | (0) |
| 2005 | Leyton Orient | 10 | (1) |
| 2005–2007 | Bury | 49 | (7) |
| 2007 | Stafford Rangers | 2 | (0) |
| 2007 | Cambridge City | | |
| 2007–2008 | Mildenhall Town | | |
| 2009 | Norwich United | | |
- * Club domestic league appearances and goals

Thomas Anthony John Youngs (31 August 1979 – 4 May 2025) was an English footballer who played as a forward.

== Career ==
Youngs was first scouted by Cambridge United's academy as a youngster, although he had not been interested in the game until he was eight years old.

He played for Cambridge, Northampton, Leyton Orient, Bury, Stafford Rangers, and other clubs. As a Cambridge player, Youngs was the club's top scorer for two consecutive seasons, 2000 to 2002, netting in 26 goals.

In 2011, while playing for Mildenhall Town, Youngs was forced to retire from active play following a serious hip injury that he suffered during a game against Wisbech Town, which Mildenhall went on to win 9–0. He remained with the club as assistant manager.

== Personal life and death ==
At school, Youngs got A Levels in English, Mathematics, and French. While an active footballer, he obtained a degree in Sports Journalism from Staffordshire University. Reportedly, his scholarly achievements inspired the chant, "Tom Youngs has got A Levels", while he was with Cambridge.

In 2015, Youngs was diagnosed with multiple sclerosis. In 2016, his autobiography was published.

Youngs was married and had two daughters. He died at St Nicholas Hospice in West Suffolk Hospital, Bury St Edmunds, on 4 May 2025. Youngs was 45.

== Honours ==
Cambridge United

- Football League Trophy runner-up: 2001–02

== See also ==
- Danny Wallace
- Ivaylo Yordanov
