= Andy Duncan (footballer, born 1977) =

English footballer

Personal information
- Full name: Andrew Duncan
- Date of birth: 20 October 1977 (age 49)
- Place of birth: Hexham, England
- Position: Defender

Senior career*
Years	Team	Apps	(Gls)
1997–1998	Manchester United	0	(0)
1998	→ Cambridge United (loan)	53	(1)
1998–2007	Cambridge United	266	(10)
2007–2009	Chelmsford City		
- * Club domestic league appearances and goals as of 10 Jan 2007, 16:55 UTC

Andy Duncan (born 20 October 1977) is an English former footballer who played as a centre-back.

He started his football career at Manchester United, but made no appearances and was loaned to Cambridge United on 9 January 1998. The loan was turned into a permanent move in April 1998 for a fee of £20,000.

By the end of the 2006–07 season, Duncan had made 328 appearances for United, scoring 11 times. In May 2007, he was released on a free transfer by the club. In July 2007 he was appointed to a part-time role working on the public relations/commercial side of the club and is responsible for promoting the club in an ambassadorial capacity. He has also signed as a player for Chelmsford City in the Isthmian League.

== Honours ==
Cambridge United

- Football League Trophy runner-up: 2001–02
