= Stevland Angus =

English footballer

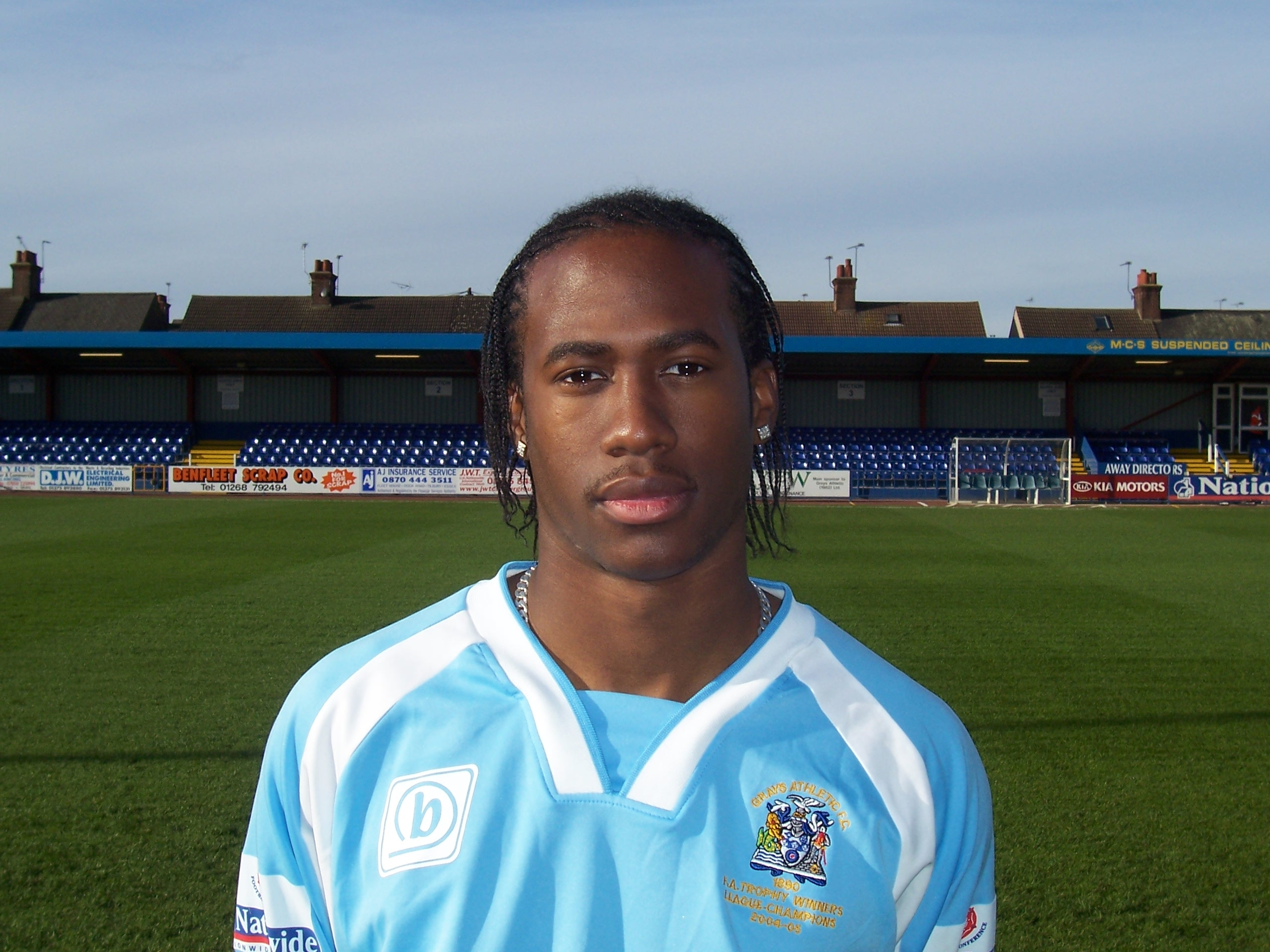

Personal information
- Full name: Stevland Dennis Angus
- Date of birth: 16 September 1980 (age 46)
- Place of birth: Westminster, England
- Position: Defender

Youth career
- 1989–1999: West Ham United

Senior career*
Years	Team	Apps	(Gls)
1999–2001	West Ham United	0	(0)
2000	→ AFC Bournemouth (loan)	9	(0)
2001–2005	Cambridge United	135	(1)
2004–2005	→ Hull City (loan)	2	(0)
2005	→ Scunthorpe United (loan)	10	(0)
2005–2006	Grays Athletic	11	(1)
2006	→ Barnet (loan)	0	(0)
2006–2007	Torquay United	38	(1)
2007	Barnet	1	(0)
- * Club domestic league appearances and goals

Stevland Dennis Angus (born 16 September 1980) is an English former footballer.

== Club career ==
Angus was born in Westminster in 1980 and began his career as a trainee with West Ham United, featuring in their 1999 FA Youth Cup win, and turning professional in August 1999. He was on the bench as West Ham won the 1999 UEFA Intertoto Cup. In need of first team experience, Angus joined League Two side AFC Bournemouth on loan in August 2000, making his league debut on 12 August 2000 in a 1–1 draw away to Bristol Rovers. He returned to West Ham after two months having made nine appearances for Bournemouth, but failed to break into the first team and was released at the end of the 2000–01 season.

In July 2001, Angus joined League One side Cambridge United on a free transfer, signing a two-year contract. Manager, John Beck, said, "He's got good pace and is a good athlete. He reads the game well and I'm looking for him to go straight into the side." He spent four years as a first team regular with Cambridge, playing 135 league games, scoring once, but towards the end of his time there fell out of favour with then manager Hervé Renard. He had loans spells with League One side Hull City and League Two side Scunthorpe United helping them both to promotion and picking up a League Two runners up medal in the 2004–05 season, before leaving Cambridge in the summer of 2005.

Angus joined Conference side Grays Athletic in September 2005, where he made 13 league and cup appearances. He joined League Two side Barnet on loan in January 2006, remaining there until the end of the season but not making any appearances due to injury. He signed a one-year contract with League Two side Torquay United for the 2006–07 season. He was a regular in the side, making 38 league and cup appearances, but was released at the end of the 2006–07 season after Torquay were relegated to the Conference. He later rejoined Barnet on a non-contract basis in August 2007. He made his debut in a 2–1 loss at Brentford, but was sent off and later released.

== Honours ==
West Ham United

- FA Youth Cup Winner: 1999

Cambridge United

- Football League Trophy Runner Up: 2001–02

Scunthorpe United

- League Two Runner Up: 2004 - 05
