= Nathan Lamey =

English footballer

Personal information
- Date of birth: 14 October 1980 (age 46)
- Place of birth: Leeds, England
- Position: Forward

Senior career*
Years	Team	Apps	(Gls)
1998–1999	Wolverhampton Wanderers	0	(0)
1999–2001	Cambridge United	6	(0)
- * Club domestic league appearances and goals

Nathan Lamey (born 14 October 1980) is an English footballer who played in The Football League for Cambridge United.
