= Adam Tann =

English association football player (born 1982)

Personal information
- Full name: Adam John Tann
- Date of birth: 12 May 1982 (age 44)
- Place of birth: Fakenham, England
- Height: 6 ft 0 in (1.83 m)
- Position: Defender

Team information
- Current team: Gorleston

Youth career
- 1995–1999: Cambridge United

Senior career*
Years	Team	Apps	(Gls)
1999–2005	Cambridge United	121	(4)
2001	→ Cambridge City (loan)	2	(0)
2005	Gravesend and Northfleet	1	(0)
2005–2006	Notts County	5	(0)
2006–2007	Leyton Orient	31	(2)
2007–2009	Notts County	54	(1)
2009–2010	Histon	41	(1)
2010–2013	Chelmsford City	68	(4)
2012–2013	→ Bury Town (loan)	23	(2)
2013–2015	Leiston	54	(3)
2015–2016	St Neots Town	54	(1)
2016–2017	AFC Sudbury	43	(2)
2018–2022	Lowestoft Town	91	(4)
2023–	Gorleston	44	(4)

International career
1999	England U18	4	(0)
- * Club domestic league appearances and goals as of 18:00, 27 April 2024 (UTC)

Adam John Tann (born 12 May 1982) is an English footballer who plays as a defender for Gorleston.

== Career ==
Born in Fakenham, Tann started his career with Cambridge United, after being awarded a professional contract at the beginning of the 1999–2000 season. He made his debut in the Football League Trophy defeat to Barnet, and remained in the reserve team until the first half of the 2001–02 season, when he appeared for the Cambridge side which finished bottom of the Division Three, and winless at home.

Tann was to move to the Lilywhites of Cambridge City on loan, but otherwise stayed with United until 2005. He then signed for Gravesend & Northfleet, making one emergency appearance before moving back to the Football League with Notts County, where he scored on his debut against Bristol City in the FA Cup.

In January 2006, he signed for Leyton Orient. Tann was diagnosed with testicular cancer in the autumn of 2006, but following a successful operation, he returned in the latter stages of the 2006–07 season. He scored an important goal in the club's history in a 2–0 away win against Bradford City to almost keep Orient safe of a place in League One for the 2007–08 season. Orient survived the next week against Nottingham Forest as results went their way.

In May 2007 he rejected a new contract at Orient to re-join former club Notts County.

His cousins Ryan Jarvis and Rossi Jarvis are also professional footballers. Ryan Jarvis was a teammate of Tann for a brief spell of the 2006/07 season, when Jarvis enjoyed a loan period at Leyton Orient. On 18 October, Tann was stretchered off Notts County's Game with Macclesfield with a suspected broken leg from a horrific tackle from Macclesfield Midfielder Gareth Evans. At the end of the 2008–09 season, Tann was released by Notts County. On 16 July 2009, Tann signed a one-year deal at Conference National outfit Histon. He left Histon at the end of the 2009–10 season and signed for Conference South team Chelmsford City. In late 2010, Adam was asked to sign a Chelmsford kit for a crazed fan of his in Australia.

== Honours ==
Cambridge United

- Football League Trophy runner-up: 2001–02
