= 2001–02 Football League Trophy =

LDV Vans Trophy

Tournament details
- Country: England; Wales
- Teams: 56

Tournament statistics
- Matches played: 57

The Football League Trophy 2001–02, known as the LDV Vans Trophy 2001–02 for sponsorship reasons, was the 21st staging of the Football League Trophy, a knock-out competition for English football clubs in Second, Third Division and the Conference. The winners were Blackpool and the runners-up were Cambridge United.

The competition began on 15 October 2001 and ended with the final on 24 March 2002 at the Millennium Stadium in Cardiff.

In the first round, there were two sections: North and South. In the following rounds each section gradually eliminates teams in knock-out fashion until each has a winning finalist. At this point, the two winning finalists face each other in the combined final for the honour of the trophy.

== First round ==
Hull City, Mansfield Town, Oldham Athletic and Tranmere Rovers from the North section all received byes.

Bristol Rovers, Luton Town, Peterborough United and Reading from the South section all received byes.

=== Northern Section ===
Date	Home team	Score	Away team
16 October	Blackpool	3–2	Stoke City
16 October	Darlington	2–1	Macclesfield Town
16 October	Doncaster Rovers	0–1	Kidderminster Harriers
16 October	Hartlepool United	0–1	Bury
16 October	Huddersfield Town	0–0	Halifax Town
Huddersfield Town won 3–1 on penalties
16 October	Leigh RMI	2–1	Scarborough
16 October	Notts County	2–0	York City
16 October	Port Vale	2–1	Carlisle United
16 October	Rochdale	2–0	Southport
16 October	Scunthorpe United	3–1	Lincoln City
16 October	Shrewsbury Town	0–1	Chesterfield
16 October	Wrexham	5–1	Wigan Athletic

=== Southern Section ===
Date	Home team	Score	Away team
15 October	Stevenage Borough	1–4	Southend United
16 October	Barnet	2–1	AFC Bournemouth
16 October	Bristol City	1–0	Torquay United
16 October	Cardiff City	7–1	Rushden & Diamonds
16 October	Cheltenham Town	2–1	Plymouth Argyle
16 October	Colchester United	1–0	Swindon Town
16 October	Dagenham & Redbridge	3–2	Leyton Orient
16 October	Exeter City	1–2	Cambridge United
16 October	Northampton Town	2–0	Oxford United
16 October	Swansea City	1–2	Brighton & Hove Albion
16 October	Yeovil Town	3–0	Queens Park Rangers
17 October	Wycombe Wanderers	1–0	Brentford

== Second round ==
=== Northern Section ===
Date	Home team	Score	Away team
30 October	Bury	2–3	Notts County
30 October	Chesterfield	1–0	Kidderminster Harriers
30 October	Hull City	3–0	Leigh RMI
30 October	Mansfield Town	0–4	Blackpool
30 October	Oldham Athletic	2–0	Tranmere Rovers
30 October	Rochdale	1–2	Port Vale
30 October	Scunthorpe United	3–0	Darlington
30 October	Wrexham	0–1	Huddersfield Town

=== Southern Section ===
Date	Home team	Score	Away team
30 October	Brighton & Hove Albion	2–1	Wycombe Wanderers
30 October	Cambridge United	1–1	Cheltenham Town
Cambridge United won 5–4 on penalties
30 October	Cardiff City	1–3	Peterborough United
30 October	Dagenham & Redbridge	3–2	Luton Town
30 October	Northampton Town	0–1	Barnet
30 October	Reading	2–1	Colchester United
30 October	Southend United	0–2	Bristol City
31 October	Bristol Rovers	1–1	Yeovil Town
Bristol Rovers won 5–4 on penalties

== Quarter-finals ==
=== Northern Section ===
Date	Home team	Score	Away team
4 December	Chesterfield	0–3	Blackpool
4 December	Huddersfield Town	4–1	Scunthorpe United
4 December	Hull City	2–1	Port Vale
4 December	Notts County	0–1	Oldham Athletic

=== Southern Section ===
Date	Home team	Score	Away team
4 December	Barnet	4–1	Reading
4 December	Bristol City	2–1	Peterborough United
4 December	Cambridge United	2–1	Brighton & Hove Albion
5 December	Bristol Rovers	4–1	Dagenham & Redbridge

== Area semi-finals ==
=== Northern Section ===
Date	Home team	Score	Away team
8 January	Hull City	0–1	Huddersfield Town
9 January	Oldham Athletic	2–5	Blackpool

=== Southern Section ===
Date	Home team	Score	Away team
5 January	Cambridge United	2–0	Barnet
9 January	Bristol City	3–0	Bristol Rovers

== Area finals ==
=== Northern Area final ===
29 January 2002

Blackpool	3–1	Huddersfield Town
Wellens 3'; Murphy 38'; Taylor 70'		Schofield 56'

Bloomfield Road, Blackpool
Attendance: 4,573
12 February 2002

Huddersfield Town	2–1 (a.e.t.)	Blackpool
Wijnhard 5' (pen.); Schofield 33'		Bullock 103'

Galpharm Stadium, Huddersfield
Attendance: 7,736

Blackpool beat Huddersfield Town 4–3 on aggregate.

=== Southern Area final ===
30 January 2002

Cambridge United	0–0	Bristol City

Abbey Stadium, Cambridge
Attendance: 3,470
19 February 2002

Bristol City	0–2	Cambridge United
		One 38', 59'

Ashton Gate, Bristol
Attendance: 12,264

Cambridge United beat Bristol City 2–0 on aggregate.

== Final ==
24 March 2002
15:00 BST

Blackpool	4–1	Cambridge United
Murphy 6'; Clarke 54'; Hills 77'; Taylor 82'		Wanless 28' (pen.)

Millennium Stadium, Cardiff
Attendance: 20,287
Referee: R. Fernandiz

BLACKPOOL:
GK	1	Phil Barnes
DF	4	John O'Kane	Yellow card
DF	26	Ian Marshall (c)	(substituted off) 39'
DF	29	Chris Clarke
DF	3	Tommy Jaszczun	Yellow card
MF	24	Martin Bullock
MF	7	Richie Wellens	(substituted off) 84'
MF	14	Lee Collins
MF	15	John Hills
FW	9	John Murphy
FW	10	Scott Taylor	(substituted off) 84'
Substitutes:
DF	5	Ian Hughes	(substituted on) 39'
MF	11	Paul Simpson	(substituted on) 84'
GK	13	James Pullen
MF	23	Graham Fenton
FW	25	Richard Walker	(substituted on) 84'
Manager:
Steve McMahon

CAMBRIDGE UNITED:
GK	1	Lionel Pérez
DF	6	Stevland Angus	(substituted off) 84'
DF	21	Adam Tann
DF	4	Andy Duncan
DF	33	Fred Murray
MF	20	Shane Tudor	(substituted off) 61'
MF	7	Paul Wanless (c)
MF	3	Ian Ashbee
MF	14	Luke Guttridge	Yellow card
FW	10	Tom Youngs
FW	9	Dave Kitson	(substituted off) 73'
Substitutes:
GK	13	Shaun Marshall
MF	8	Terry Fleming
DF	25	Danny Jackman	(substituted on) 61'
FW	31	Armand One	(substituted on) 73'
DF	32	Warren Goodhind	(substituted on) 84'
Manager:
John Taylor

MATCH RULES

- 90 minutes.
- 30 minutes of extra-time if necessary.
- Penalty shoot-out if scores still level.
- Maximum of 5 substitutions.
