= Michael Kyd =

English footballer (born 1977)

Personal information
- Date of birth: 21 May 1977 (age 49)
- Place of birth: Hackney, England
- Position: Forward

Youth career
- Stony Stratford Town
- Cambridge United

Senior career*
Years	Team	Apps	(Gls)
1995–2000	Cambridge United	124	(23)
- * Club domestic league appearances and goals

Michael Kyd (born 21 May 1977 in the London Borough of Hackney) is an English former professional footballer who played in the Football League as a forward for Cambridge United.

He first played for Stony Stratford Town before joining Cambridge United. He then came through the youth ranks at the Abbey Stadium, and played 148 games for the club in all competitions, scoring 25 goals, before he retired from professional football due to injury at the age of 23 in 2000.

Kyd later went on to have guest stints at Shepparton Soccer Club in the North Eastern Soccer League in Australia.
