= Cambridge Fans United =

Cambridge Fans United (often abbreviated to CFU) is an organisation which represents the interests of fans of the English football club Cambridge United. It was set up in 2000 to give a voice to the fans, and has since become a major shareholder in the football club using donations from supporters to finance share purchases. It is legally an Industrial and Provident Society although it is set up as a not-for-profit organisation, with any surplus in revenue reinvested in either share purchases in the club, or in its various running costs and projects.

In February 2011, CFU announced its plans to gain a controlling interest in Cambridge United and to turn it into a Community Trust Club. This followed the news that the club's owners had put the club up for sale, citing the need for new investment to take the club forward.

== Aims ==
CFU was initially formed as a supporters group to represent the views and interests of Cambridge United's fanbase, and to allow the club's continued operation. It also aimed to give fans a voice within the club through gaining a seat on the club's board, which they achieved in 2004 with the election of Brian Attmore as the first Fans' Elected Director.

=== Vision ===
After celebrating its tenth anniversary in 2010, CFU refocussed its attention to develop its vision for the next decade. It developed a Vision Statement sub-categorised into the various projects in which it has an interest:

- The club - Cambridge United Football Club is run as a sustainable business at whatever level of football, is central to the local community and with the fans fully represented at all levels.
- The organisation - CFU is run on a prudent and sustainable basis, representing all members and all fans.
- The community - CFU actively represents members and fans in the local community and with statutory, business and non-profit organisations.
- The stadium - Cambridge United's stadium meets the needs of supporters on match days, is commercially sustainable for the club and provides a vibrant resource for the wider community.
- Values - CFU is welcoming and inclusive, forward thinking, with a positive attitude to challenge.

== Achievements ==
Through CFU, fans of Cambridge United have a say in the running of the club. Since 2004 the Fans Elected Director, chosen by CFU members, has represented supporters' interests in the boardroom. We have provided assistance and support to many supporters and raised concerns when required. CFU has become one of the largest shareholders and we seek to grow our shareholding and influence at boardroom level.

In November 2003, CFU helped save the club by raising £100,000 as part of the Bridge the Gap campaign. In the following years, the financial and practical assistance we provided was crucial to Cambridge United surviving Administration. Our support has paid players' wages in difficult times.

CFU has provided financial and administrative support for the Smile Scheme, bringing many groups and individuals into contact with Cambridge United for the first time. The scheme is now sponsored and is increasingly important within the local community.

CFU has financed and provided all administration for the Junior U's scheme during the past few years. This has welcomed many new young supporters and families to the club, with over 2000 children becoming Junior U's over the years. We have also run football tournaments involving hundreds of local youngsters.

CFU has helped towards the launch of Supporters' Trusts at Peterborough United, Cambridge City and King's Lynn. We have provided both guidance and advice on a regular basis to a number of other clubs and trusts. Within the supporters' trust movement CFU are well respected and in 2004 we won 'Trust of the Year'.

CFU introduced and developed the South Stand scheme, which has seen thousands of people come to matches and also raised awareness of the club to many thousands of others. CFU have provided finance and administrative support to ensure the schemes' success.

For the past 10 years, CFU has supported Cambridge United Youth Development via finance, material items and practical assistance. We have sponsored CRC and the Youth Team as well as sponsoring individual players such as Michael Morrison. This season we will again be CRC's Match Day Sponsor and we are sponsoring goalkeeper Martin Trunca.

CFU members have freely donated their services, skills and time throughout the past ten years, working hard in many roles within the club. For example, CFU helped carry out work to improve the office portacabins, the fans' bar and the gym at the R Costings Abbey. Over the years, CFU have also donated many items ranging from training goals, bicycles, computers, televisions and radios for the blind.

CFU has instigated numerous projects to raise funds for our club. We have organised raffles, beer festivals, football tournaments, produced calendars, DVDs and fixture list posters in order to raise thousands of pounds for Cambridge United F.C. and Cambridge United Youth Development. Our support has also contributed significantly to the transfer funds available to the manager.

In 2010 CFU launched the "Cambridge 'Til I Die" book project. This will be a collection of supporters' memories and stories, providing a unique record of Cambridge United's history from the fans' perspective.
