= John Taylor (footballer, born 1964) =

English footballer and manager

Personal information
- Date of birth: 24 October 1964 (age 62)
- Place of birth: Norwich, England
- Position: Striker

Senior career*
Years	Team	Apps	(Gls)
1982	Colchester United	0	(0)
1982–1988	Sudbury Town		
1988–1992	Cambridge United	160	(46)
1992–1994	Bristol Rovers	95	(44)
1994–1995	Bradford City	36	(11)
1995–1997	Luton Town	37	(3)
1996	→ Lincoln City (loan)	5	(2)
1996	→ Colchester United (loan)	8	(5)
1997–2004	Cambridge United	172	(40)
2004	Northampton Town	8	(1)
2004	Dagenham & Redbridge	5	(1)
2004–????	Mildenhall Town		
2005–2007	Long Melford		
2007–????	Mildenhall Town		
2011–????	Walsham-le-Willows		

Managerial career
- 2001–2004: Cambridge United
- 2006–2007: Long Melford
- 2007: Newmarket Town
- Mildenhall Town
- * Club domestic league appearances and goals

John Taylor (born 24 October 1964) is an English former professional footballer. As a player, striker Taylor made over 500 league appearances, scoring 153 goals, the majority of which were for Cambridge United.

== Playing career ==
Taylor started his career as a trainee with Colchester United in 1982 but he managed just one substitute appearance for the Essex club, in a League Cup tie. Dropping out of the league, Taylor took a job as a shipping clerk and played part-time for Sudbury Town F.C. where he was spotted by Cambridge United manager Chris Turner who paid Sudbury £1,000 for his services in the Summer of 1988.

=== Cambridge United ===
Taylor had joined a young team hungry for success and after a season on the fringes of the side, he quickly built up a partnership with Dion Dublin to forge arguably the club's most successful ever striking duo. From 1989 to 1992 Cambridge United embarked on a successful run that culminated in successive promotions from Division 4 to Division 2. Much of this was down to manager John Beck and his controversial long ball methods. Beck had replaced Chris Turner as manager in January 1990. Promotion from Division 4 was achieved via a play-off final win at Wembley over Chesterfield whilst the Division 3 Championship was sewn up a year later. Coupled with this were 2 successive FA Cup Quarter-final appearances with The U's being knocked out by Crystal Palace and Arsenal.

=== Bristol Rovers ===
Cambridge United was top of the (old) Division Two in November 1991 and looking good for promotion up to what would be the first Premiership season in 1992/93. Beck's long ball tactics had become unpopular with the players, however, including Taylor. Following 46 goals in total for the club he was surprisingly off-loaded to Bristol Rovers in March 1992. Rovers striker Devon White made the opposite move and United also parted with £90,000 to complete the transfer. It remains one of the most unpopular moves in the history of the club. United eventually made the play-offs but was beaten 6–1 on aggregate in the semi-finals by Leicester City and fans still wonder what might have happened had Taylor stayed – White played just once in the final run-in, failing to score.

Taylor carried on where he left off for Rovers under their manager John Ward. He scored 44 goals in 95 appearances for the club before being sold to Bradford City for £300,000 after a proposed move to Middlesbrough fell through. A further 11 goals in 36 games followed at Bradford before Luton Town paid £200,000 to bring him back to East Anglia.

=== Luton Town ===
His time at Luton was a struggle and he suffered from injuries that contributed to his return of just 3 goals in 37 games. Loan spells at Lincoln City (who were now managed by John Beck) and Colchester United followed. Both were successful and both clubs wanted to sign him on a permanent basis. It was Cambridge United manager Roy McFarland that won the race for his signature however and he made a welcome return home to the Abbey Stadium on a free transfer in January 1997.

=== Back to Cambridge United ===
Taylor's playing career was resurrected at Cambridge. Playing with youngsters such as Trevor Benjamin, Martin Butler and Michael Kyd he was able to lend his experience and score some vital goals along the way. Taylor's goals helped United to promotion from Division 3 in 1999 and in total he went on to score a further 40 goals for the club, beating Alan Biley's long standing club record of league goals – Taylor finished his Cambridge career with 86 league goals for the club. Taylor had also been appointed Reserve Team manager after hanging up his boots and spoke of his keenness to one day go into management.

Following Roy McFarland's sacking, John Beck was once again appointed to the club as manager and Taylor remained in his role with the Reserve Team. Beck's second coming was short lived and he was sacked in November 2001. Taylor expressed his desire for the job and after an initial caretaker appointment, the role was given to him on a permanent basis in January 2002, the resounding choice of the fans.

Taylor's first game in charge was a 6–1 defeat at Tranmere Rovers and the season didn't get any easier as the club were relegated to Division Three. One highlight was an appearance in the final of the Football League Trophy where they played Blackpool at the Millennium Stadium in Cardiff, losing 4–1.

Taylor steered United to a mid-table finish in their first season back in the basement division. The following season, he was awarded a testimonial game against Leeds United to recognise 10 years service to the club. Disappointment was just around the corner however. League form had been poor and Taylor himself had been forced to put his boots back on following the controversial sale of star striker Dave Kitson to Reading. The club's board were concerned that the club could be relegated from the Football League and made the decision to sack Taylor in March 2004, finally ending his long association with the club.

== Coaching career ==
After a brief spell at Dagenham & Redbridge at the start of the 2004–05 season, Taylor became player-coach at Mildenhall Town. In August 2005 he joined Long Melford, becoming player-coach in November. He became manager of the club in February 2006. In February 2007 he left Melford to become manager of Newmarket Town but was sacked just three games into the 2007–08 season. He returned to playing, rejoining Mildenhall Town and scoring the winner on his debut, a 1–0 Eastern Counties League Premier Division victory at Lowestoft Town on 8 September 2007. He later became manager of the club.

In July 2011 he was appointed assistant manager of Walsham-le-Willows, also occasionally playing for the club. He left Walsham in 2014 after having a heart attack. His recovery was such that in August 2021, as Assistant manager of Thetford Town F.C., 56 year-old Taylor was able to select himself to play against Lakenheath F.C.

== Honours ==
=== As a player ===
Cambridge United

- Football League Third Division: 1990–91
- Football League Third Division runner-up: 1998–99
- Football League Fourth Division play-offs: 1990

=== As a manager ===
Cambridge United

- Football League Trophy runner-up: 2001–02
