= Cambridge United F.C. =

Association football club in Cambridge, England

Cambridge United
- Full name: Cambridge United Football Club
- Nickname: The U's
- Founded: 1912; 114 years ago (as Abbey United)
- Ground: Cledara Abbey Stadium
- Capacity: 7,937 (4,321 seated)
- Owner(s): Paul Barry (75.01%), Mark Green (24.99%)
- Chairman: Paul Barry
- Manager: Neil Harris
- League: EFL League One
- 2025–26: EFL League Two, 3rd of 24 (promoted)
- Website: www.cambridgeunited.com
Home colours	Away colours

Cambridge United Football Club is a professional association football club based in the city of Cambridge, England. The club competes in EFL League One, the third tier of English football, following promotion from EFL League Two. Nicknamed the U's, the club has played at the Abbey Stadium since 1932.

The club was founded in 1912 as Abbey United, and took the name Cambridge United in 1951. They played in local amateur leagues before joining the Southern League after finishing as runners-up of the Eastern Counties League in 1957–58. Under Bill Leivers's stewardship they were crowned Southern League Premier Division champions in 1968–69 and 1969–70, which helped to secure their election into the Football League in 1970. They won promotion out of the Fourth Division in 1972–73, but suffered immediate relegation. They won the Fourth Division title in 1976–77, and then secured promotion out of the Third Division the following season. They remained in the Second Division for six seasons, before they suffered consecutive relegations.

Manager John Beck led United to promotion out of the Fourth Division via play-offs in 1990 and then the Third Division title in 1990–91, with the club reaching the Second Division play-offs the following season. Two relegations in three years left Cambridge United back in the fourth tier, before promotion was secured at the end of the 1998–99 campaign. They entered the Conference in 2005, after two relegations in four seasons, where they remained for nine seasons. They finished as Conference runners-up three times, being beaten in the play-off finals in 2008 and 2009, before eventually securing promotion after winning the 2014 play-off final. After spending seven seasons in League Two, Cambridge United were promoted to League One as runners-up, in 2021, under Mark Bonner.

Although the club has traditionally worn amber and black at home, it has experimented with a number of designs of shirts including plain amber with black trim, amber and black squares, stripes, and amber with a black sash. The club had close links with Cambridge Regional College, a team that operated as a de facto reserve team between 2006 and 2014. The Cambridge United Community Trust perform a lot of charity work in the local community. The club is based at the Abbey Stadium on Newmarket Road, approximately 2 miles (3 km) east of Cambridge city centre. The stadium has a capacity of 7,937, made up of terracing and seated areas.

== History ==
=== Formation and early years ===
The club was founded in 1912 as Abbey United, named after the Abbey district of Cambridge. A club called Cambridge United existed in Cambridge from 1909, but it was not linked to the club that exists today. The club played in local amateur leagues for many of its early years, moving from ground to ground around Cambridge (see Stadium below) before settling at the Abbey Stadium. In 1949 the club turned professional, and changed its name to Cambridge United in 1951. They played in the Eastern Counties League until finishing as runners-up in 1957–58, which saw them promoted to the Southern League. Three years later, Cambridge United reached the Premier Division of the Southern League.

=== First League era: 1970–2005 ===
Final table positions since 1971

After election to the Football League in 1970, to replace Bradford (Park Avenue), the club was promoted from the Fourth Division after three seasons, but went straight back down.

Following the appointment of Ron Atkinson as manager, Cambridge United won successive promotions which took them into the Second Division in 1978 – a mere eight years after joining the Football League. Atkinson had gone to West Bromwich Albion, a First Division club, in January 1978, and was succeeded by John Docherty, who oversaw the second promotion.

Cambridge United peaked at eighth place in the Second Division in 1980. However, a terrible season in 1983–84 (setting a league record for most successive games without a win, 31, which was surpassed by Derby County in 2008) was followed by a further relegation in 1984–85 (equalling the then league record for most losses in a season, 33). These successive relegations, which also had a negative effect on the club's attendances as well as its finances, placed Cambridge United back in the Fourth Division, the lowest professional league in English football at the time. They had to apply for re-election in their first season back in the Fourth Division, and promotion would not be achieved for another four years.

The early 1990s was the U's most successful period. Soon after the appointment of new manager John Beck, the club won the first ever appearance as a professional club at Wembley Stadium, the Fourth Division playoff final in May 1990, which secured promotion to the Third Division – the club's first promotion for 12 years. Dion Dublin scored the only goal in a game against Chesterfield. Under Beck, United gained promotion from the Fourth Division and had already reached the FA Cup quarter finals in 1990, and reached them again a year later, and winning the Third Division in 1991. United reached the play-offs in 1992, after finishing 5th in the Second Division, but failed in their bid to become founder members of the Premier League. This was the club's highest final league placing to date. The following season the club sacked John Beck and were relegated from the new First Division. Further relegation followed two seasons later. United returned to Division Two but were relegated in 2002 despite a successful run in the Football League Trophy which saw them reach the final which they lost 1–4 to Blackpool at the Millennium Stadium in Cardiff.

In 2005, after 35 years in the Football League, Cambridge United were relegated into the Football Conference. This brought with it financial difficulties and the club filed for administration on 29 April. On 22 July 2005 the club came out of administration with a deal being struck with HM Revenue and Customs at the eleventh hour after the intervention of then sports minister Richard Caborn. Cambridge had sold their Abbey Stadium home earlier in the season for £1.9 million to keep the club afloat.

=== In the Conference: 2005–2014 ===
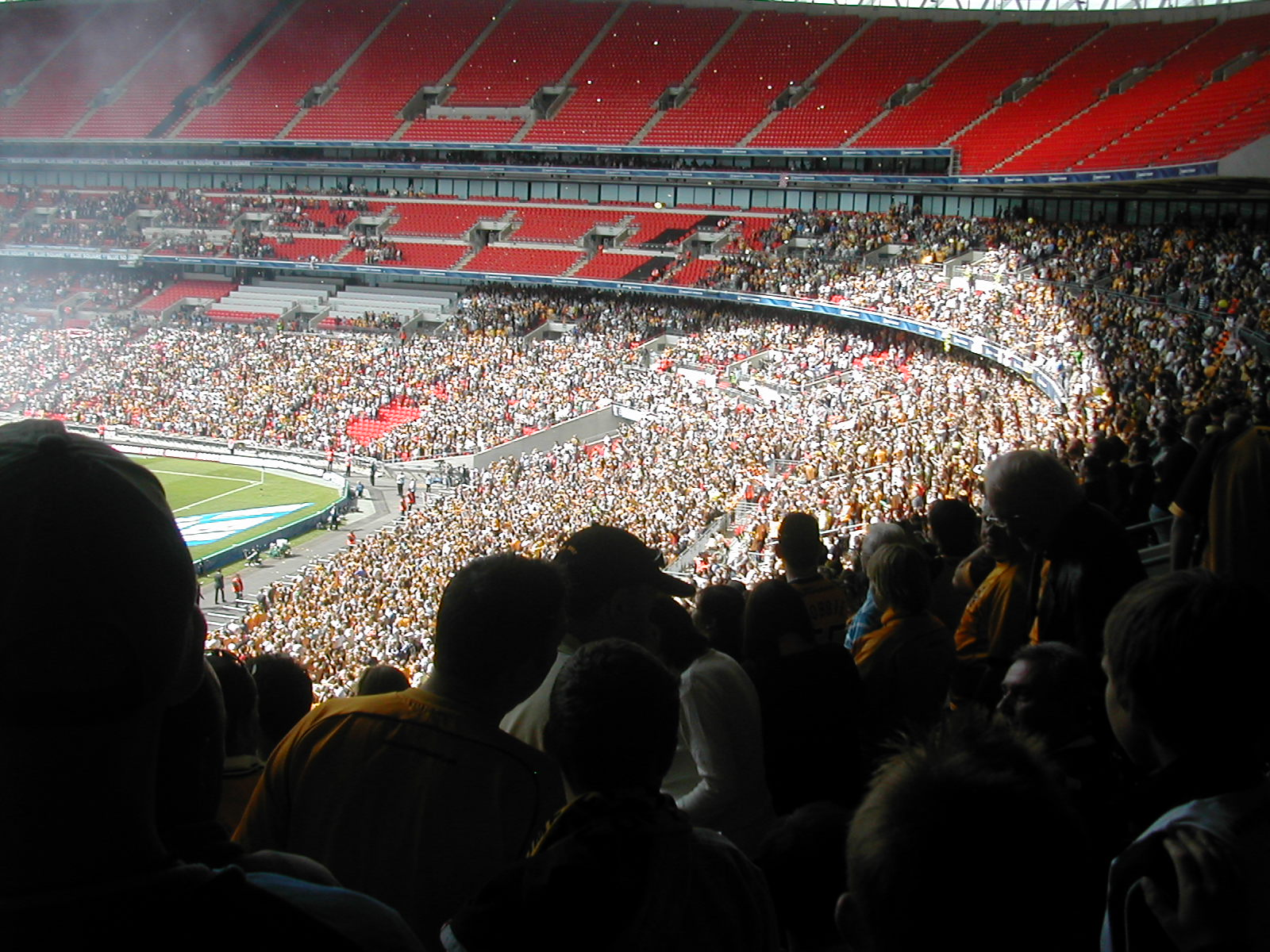
Cambridge United supporters at Wembley Stadium

On the eve of the 2006–07 season, it was announced that former Norwich City striker Lee Power would be the club's new chairman taking over from Brian Attmore's caretaking reign. Johnny Hon was also to rejoin the board as vice-chairman after John Howard's resignation on conflict of interests grounds (owing to his ownership of Bideawhile 445 Ltd, United's landlords). Jimmy Quinn was appointed manager soon after Power took charge and, after a difficult settling-in period which included a humiliating 5–0 loss to local rivals Histon, he guided Cambridge United away from another possible relegation by achieving five wins from their last seven games of the season.

After signing several respected and experienced players at the non-league level in the following close season Quinn led Cambridge to their then longest ever unbeaten start to a season (2007–08), which stretched to twelve games. Off the field, United reported several major sponsorship deals which seemed to point towards increased financial security. Halfway through the season the chairman, Lee Power, resigned. He was replaced by Wayne Purser. United finished the season in 2nd place, qualifying for the play-offs. They beat Burton Albion in the semi-final, 4–3 on aggregate, but lost 1–0 to Exeter City in the final, played at Wembley Stadium.

Following the play-off defeat many players left the club, culminating in the departure of manager Jimmy Quinn. Quinn was succeeded by former Southport manager Gary Brabin, who appointed Paul Carden as player-assistant manager. United finished the 2008–09 season again 2nd in the league, and also again reached the play-off final, overturning a 3–1 deficit to beat Stevenage Borough 4–3 on aggregate in the semi-final; however, they were beaten again at Wembley Stadium, 2–0 by Torquay United. Brabin was named as the Conference's Manager of the Season, but was sacked in the close-season after reportedly falling out with the chairman. He was replaced by Martin Ling, who resigned just eight days into the job, before the start of the 2009–10 season and was followed days later by chairman George Rolls. The new board re-appointed Ling as manager the following week.

Cambridge finished Ling's first season in 10th place – not enough for a playoff place. The following season, on 6 January 2011, with Cambridge in a similar position to where they finished the previous season, the club's owners put the club up for sale citing the need for new funds to take the club forward. Despite interest being expressed from a number of parties, no new owner has yet been found. Later the same month, the club's landlords Grosvenor Group revealed the plans for a new community stadium, including potential new locations both within the city and outside it. At the start of 2011 Martin Ling was removed from his position as manager and replaced on a temporary basis by CRC manager Jez George. He managed to steer the club towards safety, finishing 17th, which led to George's role being made permanent. After having rebuilt the squad with players from the club's youth system and with astute signings in Harrison Dunk and Tom Shaw, George managed to lead Cambridge to a 9th-place finish, a huge improvement on their previous season. As well as the league, Jez George also took Cambridge to the quarter-final of the FA Trophy (which was the furthest they had reached at the time), but lost 2–1 at home to minnows, Wealdstone. Eleven games into the following season Jez George became Director of Football, and Richard Money was announced as the new head coach of the club. The club spent much of the season in mid-table, finishing in 14th position with 59 points. The squad was greatly revamped, and United started 2013–14 with a record-breaking 16 games unbeaten. Cambridge finished the season in second place, qualifying for the play-offs. After beating FC Halifax Town 2–1, on aggregate, in the semi-final, they won 2–1 against Gateshead in the final, held at Wembley Stadium, gaining promotion back to the Football League after a nine-year absence. The club also reached their first FA Trophy final, held at Wembley Stadium, where they beat Gosport Borough 4–0.

=== 2014–present: Back in The Football League ===
In their first season back in the Football League, Cambridge United progressed to the fourth round of the FA Cup, where they drew at home with Premier League team Manchester United. The match at the Abbey Stadium ended in a goalless draw, forcing a replay at Old Trafford, which Manchester United won 3–0. In the league, Cambridge finished 19th with 51 points, 10 points above the relegation zone. The following season started poorly, and Richard Money was sacked in November 2015, to be replaced by Shaun Derry who would lead Cambridge to a 9th-place finish.

In the 2019–20 season, Mark Bonner was placed in temporary charge until the end of the season. Under Bonner, Cambridge won four from their final seven matches before the disruption caused by the COVID-19 pandemic forced the cancellation of the season with Cambridge placed in 16th after a points per game ruling. After being given the role permanently, Bonner guided Cambridge to promotion as runners-up in the 2020–21 season.

Following additional investment from the club's co-owners, United bought back the Abbey Stadium from Grosvenor in September 2022, 20 years after selling it.

In the 2022–23 season, United avoided relegation on the final day of the season after beating Forest Green Rovers 2–0 at home on the final day of the season. They were relegated to League Two at the end of the 2024–25 season after finishing 23rd. At the end of the 2025–26 season on 2 May 2026, Cambridge United drew 0–0 at Crewe Alexandra to finish third and secure an immediate return to League One.

== Colours and badge ==
The club's first shirt (1924–25)

Cambridge United have traditionally worn amber and black home kits in a variety of designs, including plain amber with black trim (e.g. 1979–1991), amber and black quarters (1996–1998) and halves (e.g. 1924–25), and a variety of stripes (e.g. 1926–1936. Only between 1957–1960 and 1970–1972 have shirts not been predominantly amber, when the club opted for white with a small amber and black detail on the shirt's sleeves. Away from home, kits have often been white with some amber and/or black detail, although recently shirts have been blue at the request of the away shirts sponsors.

Club badge from 1986-2025

The club's current crest was adopted in 2024 after a consultation, and implemented for the beginning of the 2025–26 season. The circular design incorporates the shape of Magdalene Bridge over the River Cam.

The previous crest, a large football over which the letters 'CU' are emblazoned, with three turrets on top, was worn on shirts since the 1986–87 season, with a brief change to a more 'elaborate' design between 1996 and 1998. Previously, shirts had simply been embroidered with the club's acronym 'CUFC' or a 'Book & Ball' badge used during the late 1970s. The club used a special badge to commemorate their centenary in the 2012–13 season. A design change was proposed without consultation in 2023, but was not adopted.

=== Sponsorship and manufacturers ===
A sponsor first appeared on a Cambridge United shirt for the 1985–86 season when the shirt was changed mid-season from plain amber to amber and black stripes. Spraymate were the club's first shirt sponsor, and have since been followed by an array of local and national companies: Lynfox, Howlett, Fujitsu, Beaumont Stainless Steels, Premier Travel, C and R Windows, Quicksilver (couriers), Capital Sports, The Global Group, Haart, Global Self Drive, and in 2009–10 Greene King IPA.

The teams kits have been manufactured by a number of companies, with Admiral providing the first strip on which a maker's logo appeared. The club have subsequently worn kits created by, among others, Nike, Patrick, Sporta and, Vandanel, with the latter providing the strip for the 2007–08 season and subsequently an amber shirt featuring a dramatic black sash design that polarised the opinions of fans. In the summer of 2010 the Club parted company with Vandanel, citing concerns regards the company's ability to continue to service their needs, signing a deal with Italian company Erreà. For the start of the 2013–14 season, The U's signed a deal with Genesis Sports to provide Puma team wear for the club. This deal has been continued into the 2014–15 season and saw the home shirts make a return to amber and black stripes. At the beginning of the 2019–2020 Campaign they have switched to Sportswear Company Hummel. Since the start of the 2023–24 season the kit has been produced by Umbro.

== Stadium ==
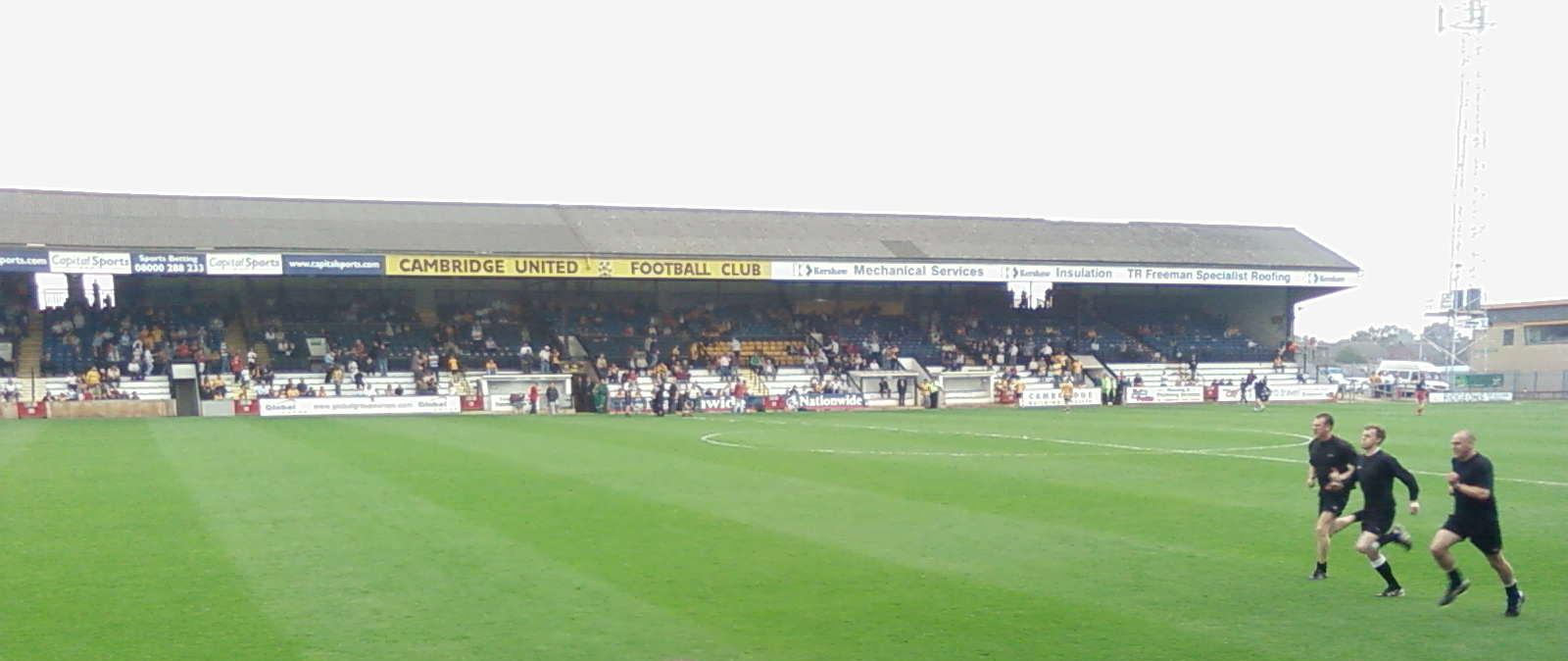
The main stand at Abbey Stadium

Cambridge United currently play their home matches at the Abbey Stadium, which has been their home since 1932. The stadium is located in the Abbey area of the city on Newmarket Road, approximately 3 kilometres (1.8miles) east of the city centre. The stadium currently has a capacity of 8,127, of which 4,376 are seated. Due to sponsorship reasons, the ground has also been known as The R. Costings Abbey Stadium and the Cambs Glass Stadium.

Before opening the Abbey with a victory over Cambridge University Press in a friendly on 31 August 1932, United had played matches at a number of venues around the city. When playing under the Abbey United name, games were played on Midsummer Common until the outbreak of World War I. When the war ended, the club moved to Stourbridge Common and, after promotion to the Cambridgeshire League Division One in 1923, moved once again to land just off Newmarket Road in Cambridge. This ground, affectionately known as the 'Celery Trenches' due to the poor state of the pitch, was christened with a 1–0 league victory over Histon Institute and became United's home for a decade. While based at the Trenches, the club established its offices at the 'Dog & Pheasant' pub on Newmarket Road, which it used as an away dressing room on matchdays, as well as a store for equipment including the pitch's goalposts. However, the Cambridgeshire FA were unhappy with the state of the pitch at this new home, and the club moved to Parker's Piece at the start of the 1930–31 season. Despite the special significance of Parker's Piece in the history of football, it being the first place where the Cambridge Rules were played out, the lack of spectator capacity and disruption caused during games meant this move was not a successful one.

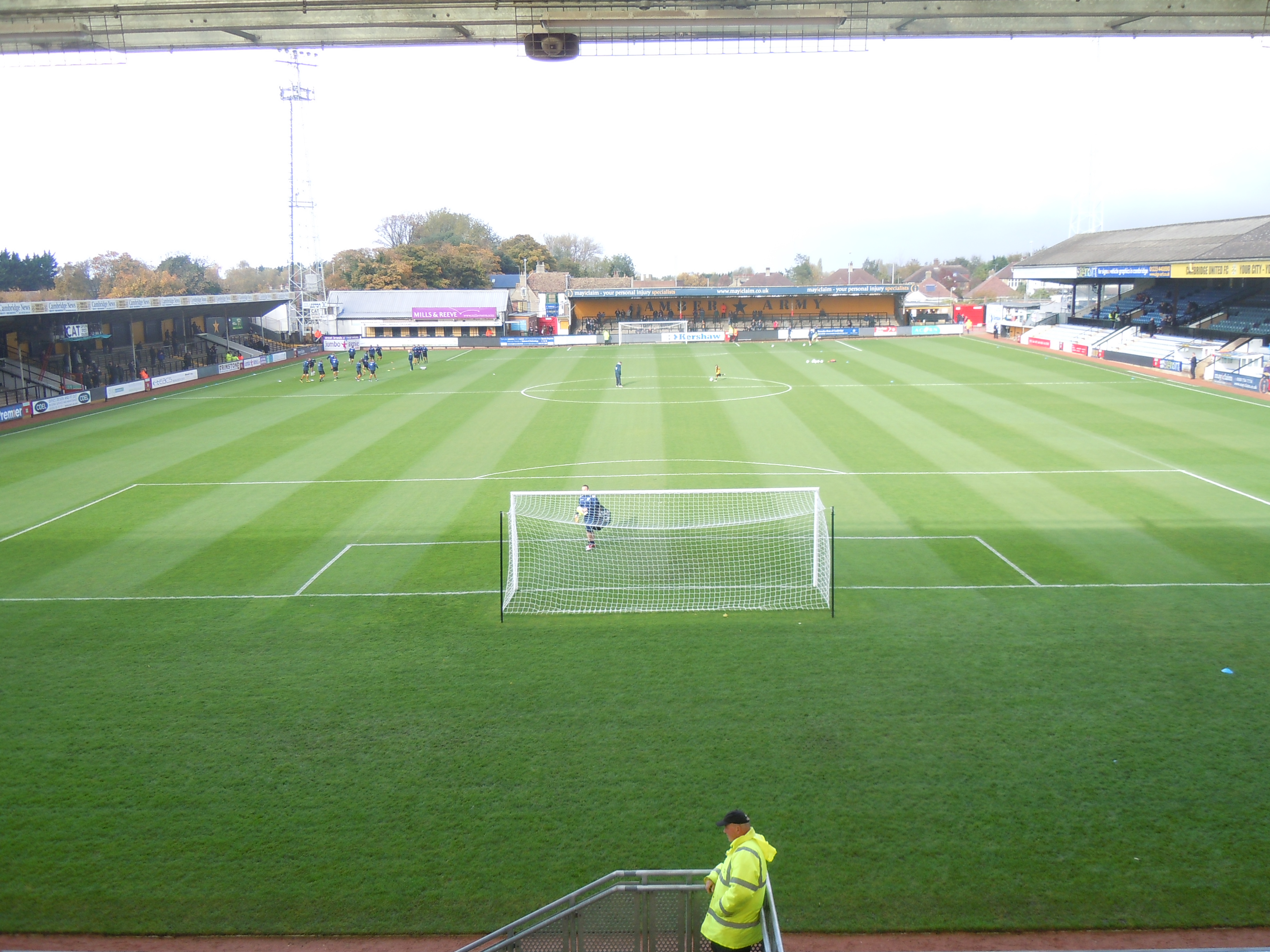
Abbey Stadium from the South Stand

In January 2006, John Howard announced plans to move out of the Abbey Stadium to a new purpose-built stadium in Milton. This was supported by Cambridgeshire Horizons. These were criticised by fans as risking the club's identity by moving out of the city and, despite Howard describing them as crucial to the club's future, little else was heard of them publicly. Subsequently, a new community stadium, that would also include conference facilities, was ruled out by a Planning Inspector's report which described it as unsuitable development in the green belt and in October 2009, Cambridge United announced its intentions to redevelop the Abbey Stadium with chairman.

The Stadium was sold by Bideawhile to Grosvenor Estates in June 2010. Soon after, the new landlords, in combination with the club and supporters group Cambridge Fans United, announced that they had signed a Memorandum of Understanding to positively work together to achieve the relocation of the club to a new stadium. In January 2011, plans for a new community stadium were unveiled at an open meeting, including potential new locations both within the city and outside it.

A final site, at Trumpington Meadows, was agreed upon and initial plans for an 8,000 capacity stadium were put forward, as part of a "Cambridge Sporting Village" incorporating housing and retail development. Objections from residents and local councils saw the proposal blocked in 2013, and plans announced in January 2015 keep the sporting village development at Trumpington, but without the new stadium. Instead Cambridge United will redevelop the Abbey Stadium. First plans were presented in May 2015, which would increase capacity of the Newmarket Road End, incorporating safe standing, complete redevelopment of the Habbin Terrace and slight expansion to the Main Stand.

Cambridge United bought back the Abbey Stadium in September 2022, and restarted planning for significant expansion and improvement of the ground, with larger new stands proposed for the terraced Newmarket Road End and Habbin Stand.

== Supporters ==
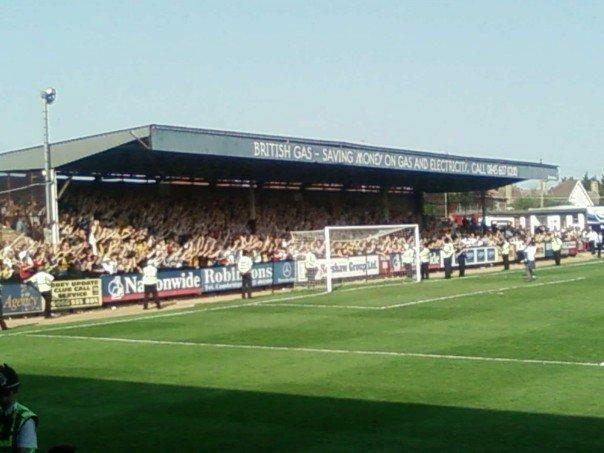
Cambridge United supporters at Abbey Stadium

Cambridge United have a number of supporters' groups and associations, some of which are independently run and some are run by the club itself. These include: an Away Travel Club, who provide travel to every away game as well as hosting fundraising events and sponsoring senior players; youth group Junior U's; Cambridge United Supporters Association, a group giving a voice to the fans in communications with the club and the media; Vice-presidents Club, who offer match day hospitality packages; and regional associations in St Ives, East Cambridgeshire, Royston, St Neots, Bedfordshire and Saffron Walden. Cambridge Fans United is an independent supporters group who are now a significant shareholder in the club with representation on the fans' behalf on the board of directors. In addition to these supporters' groups, the club currently has one independent fanzine, United in Endeavour, which raises funds for Cambridge Fans United and is sold at home games.

During their time in the Conference, attendances at the Abbey were amongst the highest in the league. Cambridge United's first two seasons in the Conference saw them post the fourth-highest average attendance figures in both years (2,607 in 2005–06 and 2,815 in 2006–07). They had the third-highest attendances in their final season in the Conference, averaging 3,085 for 2013–14.

SiFive became the main sponsor of the Cambridge United F.C. for the 2022/23 and the 2023/24 seasons. The partnership is intended to amplify both of their visions to support each other and the community, as well as establish SiFive within the city.

== Rivalries ==
Prior to election into the Football League, Cambridge City were regarded as the club's biggest rivals, although the rivalry has since waned significantly. Peterborough United are considered to be their current main rivals, something that was recognised in a survey by the Football Fans Census as a reciprocated feeling, where the two sides contest the Cambridgeshire derby. This is despite the fact the two clubs have experienced many seasons in separate divisions. Other lesser rivalries include those with Northampton Town, Colchester United, Luton Town, and Stevenage.

== Players ==
=== Current squad ===
As of 11 October 2026

Note: Flags indicate national team as defined under FIFA eligibility rules; some limited exceptions apply. Players may hold more than one non-FIFA nationality.

No.	Pos.	Nation	Player
1	GK	ENG	Jake Eastwood
2	DF	ENG	Liam Bennett
3	DF	ENG	Callum Perry (on loan from Coventry City)
4	MF	ENG	Dominic Ball (captain)
5	DF	GER	Patrick Bauer
6	DF	ENG	Kelland Watts
7	FW	ENG	Isaac Heath
8	MF	ENG	Owen Moxon (on loan from Stockport County)
9	FW	SCO	Louis Appéré
10	MF	ENG	Ben Knight
11	FW	SLE	Sullay Kaikai
12	FW	ENG	Callum Stead
13	GK	ENG	Gabriel Breeze
14	FW	MAR	Gassan Ahadme (on loan from Charlton Athletic)

No.	Pos.	Nation	Player
15	DF	IRL	Cathal Heffernan
17	MF	COD	Pelly Ruddock Mpanzu
19	FW	NIR	Shayne Lavery
21	MF	IRL	Shane McLoughlin
22	DF	ENG	Zak Bradshaw
27	FW	IRL	Glenn McConnell
29	DF	IRL	Sam Curtis (on loan from Sheffield United)
30	MF	ENG	Lohan McDougald
32	FW	ENG	Daniel Efobi
33	DF	ENG	Daniel Herd
38	MF	ENG	George Hoddle
41	DF	ENG	Jamie Murefu
44	MF	ENG	Raees Bangura-Williams (on loan from Millwall)

==== Out on loan ====
Note: Flags indicate national team as defined under FIFA eligibility rules; some limited exceptions apply. Players may hold more than one non-FIFA nationality.

No.	Pos.	Nation	Player
18	FW	ENG	Ryan Loft (at Hornchurch until 6 January 2027)
25	GK	WAL	Ben Hughes (at Braintree Town until January 2027)

No.	Pos.	Nation	Player
31	GK	ENG	JJ Briggs (at Cray Wanderers until 2 January 2027)

=== Reserves and Centre of Excellence ===
Before relegation from the Football League in 2005, Cambridge United entered a reserve team in the Football Combination. However, this ceased following financial difficulties which meant the club could not guarantee being able to put out a team for every game. In 2006 United formed Cambridge Regional College as a de facto reserve team and entered them in the Eastern Counties League Premier Division. FA rules prohibit reserve teams playing at certain levels of the football pyramid, and so the CRC name was adopted in recognition of the college's financial support, and because the team is made up almost entirely of the college's students.

Cambridge United's Centre of Excellence is widely regarded throughout professional football circles as one of the best in England. Many players have come through the youth team to establish themselves as first team players at Cambridge (for example Dan Gleeson, Daniel Chillingworth, Robbie Willmott and Josh Coulson) and go on to play at a higher level (recent examples include John Ruddy, Michael Morrison and Josh Simpson). Wales international Jack Collison was in the youth squads for several years before joining West Ham United's youth academy after the centre closed down following relegation to the Conference Premier.

The youth team won their division of the Football League Youth Alliance in both 2003–04 and 2004–05, showing the strength of the club's Centre of Excellence. The club's success in the FA Youth Cup in recent years has also far surpassed its expectation given the level of the parent club – in 2006–07 the team was the highest placed non-league team reaching the Fourth Round after seven games (including qualifying games).

=== Notable former players ===
- For all former players with a Wikipedia article see Category:Cambridge United F.C. players

Notable players include Wilf Mannion, the only former Cambridge United player to be inducted into the English Football Hall of Fame, Brian Moore, former West Ham United player who scored a club record 68 goals in 1957–58 despite blindness in one eye, and Lindsay Smith, voted Cambridge United's all-time cult hero in a poll for BBC Sport's Football Focus in August 2004. Others include Dion Dublin, who went on to score 119 Premier League goals and receive four England caps, and Luke Berry, cult hero who finished as United's top scorer in various seasons and played for Luton Town in the Premier League in the 2023–24 season.

== Club management ==
=== Club staff ===
As of 21 May 2025

Position	Staff
Chairman	Godric Smith
Chief executive officer	Alex Tunbridge
Director of Football	Mark Bonner
First-team manager	Neil Harris
First-team assistant manager	Adam Barrett
First-team coach	Liam O'Neil
First-team goalkeeper coach	Martin Davies
Head of performance	Jack Manuel
Head of medical	Hayden Clifton
Head of recruitment	Nick Tyler-Hicks
Kit manager	Jamie Cozens
Recruitment analyst	Wayne Blackman
Club doctor	Dr Boudjema Boukersi
Stadium manager	Ian Darler
Finance Manager	Anthony Jones
Academy manager	Dominic Knighton
Senior academy physiotherapist	Vacant
Head of academy coaching	Liam Bloye
Professional development-phase lead coach	Marc Forrest
Youth development-phase lead coach	Dario Seminerio
Foundation development-phase lead coach	James Nicholas
Hospitality manager	Dougie Macandrew
Supporter engagement officer	Amelia Edwards

=== Managerial history ===
Since joining the Football League in 1970, Cambridge United has had twenty-five full-time managers as well as many caretakers and player-managers.

Name	Years
Bill Leivers	1967–74
Ron Atkinson	1974–78
John Docherty	1978–83
John Ryan	1984–85
Ken Shellito	1985
Chris Turner	1986–90
John Beck	1990–92
Gary Johnson (caretaker)	1992
Ian Atkins	1992–93
Gary Johnson	1993–95
Tommy Taylor	1995–96
Roy McFarland	1996–2001
John Beck	2001
John Taylor	2001–04
Dale Brooks (caretaker)	2004
Claude Le Roy	2004
Herve Renard	2004
Ricky Duncan (caretaker)	2004
Steve Thompson	2004–05
Rob Newman	2005–06
Lee Power (caretaker)	2006
Jimmy Quinn	2006–08
Gary Brabin	2008–09
Paul Carden (caretaker)	2009
Martin Ling	2009–11
Jez George	2011–12
Richard Money	2012–15
Shaun Derry	2015–18
Joe Dunne	2018
Colin Calderwood	2018–20
Mark Bonner	2020–23
Neil Harris	2023–24
Barry Corr (caretaker)	2023, 2024
Garry Monk	2024–25
Neil Harris	2025–

== Honours ==
League

- Third Division (level 3)
  - Champions: 1990–91
  - Runners-up: 1977–78
- Fourth Division / Third Division / League Two (level 4)
  - Champions: 1976–77
  - Runners-up: 1998–99, 2020–21
  - Promoted: 1972–73, 2025–26
  - Play-off winners: 1990
- Conference Premier (level 5)
  - Play-off winners: 2014
- Southern League
  - Champions: 1968–69, 1969–70

Cup

- Football League Trophy
  - Runners-up: 2001–02
- FA Trophy
  - Winners: 2013–14
- Southern League Cup
  - Winners: 1961–62, 1964–65, 1968–69

== Club records ==
Scorelines

- Biggest league win:
  - 7–0 (v Morecambe, League Two, 19 April 2016)
  - 7–0 (v Weymouth, Conference Premier, March 2007)
  - 7–0 (v Forest Green Rovers, Conference Premier, September 2009)
- Biggest cup win:
  - 5–1 (v Bristol City, FA Cup 5th round second replay, February 1990)
  - 4–0 (v Sheffield Wednesday, FA Cup 5th round, February 1991)
  - 4–0 (v Coventry City FA Cup 2nd round, December 2016)
  - 4–0 (v Fleetwood Town FA Cup 2nd round, December 2023)
- Biggest league defeat:
  - 0–7 (v Luton Town, League Two, November 2017)
- Biggest cup defeat:
  - 0–7 (v Sunderland, League Cup second round, October 2002)

Players

- Most goals in one game: 5 – Steve Butler (v Exeter City, April 1994)
- Most League appearances: 416 – Steve Spriggs (1975–1987)
- Most League goals in one season: 32 – Paul Mullin (EFL League Two, 2020–21)
- Youngest player: Ben Worman – 16 years (v Peterborough United, 7 November 2017)
- Oldest player: John Taylor – 39 years (during 2003–04 season)
- Highest transfer fee paid: £190,000 – Steve Claridge (from Luton Town, November 1992)
- Highest transfer fee received: £1,500,000 – Trevor Benjamin (to Leicester City, July 2000)

Club

- Highest league finish: 5th in 1991-92 Football League Second Division (second tier)
- Best FA Cup performance: Quarter-finalists, 1989–90, 1990–91
- Best Football League Cup performance: Quarter-finalists, 1992–93
- Best Football League Trophy performance: Runners-up, 2001–02
- Best FA Trophy performance: Winners, 2013–14
- Most League Points in a Season: 86 (Division Three, 1990–91), (Conference, 2007–08 & 2008–09)
- Most League Goals in a Season: 87 (Division Four, 1976–77)
- Record Attendance: 14,000 (v Chelsea, May 1970)

== Charity (Cambridge United Community Trust) ==
Cambridge United Community Trust (CUCT) is the charity wing of Cambridge United Football Club.

CUCT was founded after Cambridge United were relegated from the Football League in 2005. The charity's stated mission is: "To place Cambridge United at the heart of a community where individuals respect each other and themselves, are empowered to maximise their potential and have the inspiration to fulfil this potential."

The charity operates in primary schools across Cambridgeshire including in a partnership with AstraZenenca. CUCT also delivers both health and inclusion work in the city of Cambridge.

The charity's current CEO is Ben Szreter.

== Women's team ==
There is an affiliated women's team called Cambridge United W.F.C..
