= 2004–05 Rochdale A.F.C. season =

English football club season

Rochdale
2004–05 season
- Chairman: David Kilpatrick
- Manager: Steve Parkin
- League Two: 9th
- FA Cup: Third round
- League Cup: First round
- Football League Trophy: Second round
- Top goalscorer: League: Grant Holt (17 goals); All: Grant Holt (24 goals)

The 2004–05 season was Rochdale A.F.C.'s 98th in existence and their 31st consecutive in the fourth tier of the English football league, now renamed as League Two. Rochdale finished the season in 9th place.

== Statistics ==
| No. | Pos | Nat | Player | Total | | League Two | | FA Cup | | League Cup | | League Trophy | |
| No. | Pos | Nat | Player | Apps | Goals | Apps | Goals | Apps | Goals | Apps | Goals | Apps | Goals |
|---|---|---|---|---|---|---|---|---|---|---|---|---|---|
| 20 | FW | (Kenya) KEN | Taiwo Atieno | 17 | 2 | 7+7 | 2 | 1+1 | 0 | 0+0 | 0 | 1+0 | 0 |
| 7 | MF | (New Zealand) NZL | Leo Bertos | 47 | 4 | 34+9 | 4 | 2+1 | 0 | 0+0 | 0 | 1+0 | 0 |
| 8 | MF | (England) ENG | Neil Brisco | 12 | 0 | 6+5 | 0 | 0+0 | 0 | 0+0 | 0 | 0+1 | 0 |
| 27 | DF | (England) ENG | Gary Brown | 1 | 0 | 1+0 | 0 | 0+0 | 0 | 0+0 | 0 | 0+0 | 0 |
| 6 | DF | (England) ENG | Daryl Burgess | 25 | 0 | 19+2 | 0 | 1+0 | 0 | 1+0 | 0 | 2+0 | 0 |
| 14 | MF | (Republic of Ireland) IRL | Brian Cash | 7 | 0 | 6+0 | 0 | 0+0 | 0 | 1+0 | 0 | 0+0 | 0 |
| 18 | DF | (England) ENG | Jamie Clark | 48 | 1 | 33+9 | 1 | 3+0 | 0 | 1+0 | 0 | 1+1 | 0 |
| 4 | MF | (England) ENG | Ernie Cooksey | 40 | 5 | 28+7 | 5 | 3+0 | 0 | 0+0 | 0 | 2+0 | 0 |
| 1 | GK | (Wales) WAL | Neil Edwards | 17 | 0 | 16+0 | 0 | 0+0 | 0 | 1+0 | 0 | 0+0 | 0 |
| 2 | DF | (Wales) WAL | Wayne Evans | 46 | 0 | 41+0 | 0 | 3+0 | 0 | 1+0 | 0 | 1+0 | 0 |
| 3 | DF | (England) ENG | Tony Gallimore | 39 | 0 | 32+2 | 0 | 2+0 | 0 | 1+0 | 0 | 2+0 | 0 |
| 13 | GK | (Scotland) SCO | Matt Gilks | 36 | 0 | 31+0 | 0 | 3+0 | 0 | 0+0 | 0 | 2+0 | 0 |
| 12 | DF | (England) ENG | Alan Goodall | 38 | 2 | 28+7 | 2 | 2+0 | 0 | 0+0 | 0 | 1+0 | 0 |
| 5 | DF | (Wales) WAL | Gareth Griffiths | 44 | 4 | 37+3 | 1 | 2+0 | 0 | 0+0 | 0 | 2+0 | 3 |
| 16 | DF | (England) ENG | Greg Heald | 33 | 2 | 30+0 | 2 | 2+0 | 0 | 1+0 | 0 | 0+0 | 0 |
| 9 | FW | (England) ENG | Grant Holt | 46 | 24 | 41+0 | 17 | 3+0 | 5 | 1+0 | 1 | 1+0 | 1 |
| 11 | MF | (England) ENG | Gary Jones | 45 | 8 | 40+0 | 8 | 3+0 | 0 | 1+0 | 0 | 1+0 | 0 |
| 21 | MF | (England) ENG | Ben Kitchen | 1 | 0 | 0+1 | 0 | 0+0 | 0 | 0+0 | 0 | 0+0 | 0 |
| 17 | FW | (England) ENG | Rickie Lambert | 15 | 6 | 15+0 | 6 | 0+0 | 0 | 0+0 | 0 | 0+0 | 0 |
| 17 | MF | (Northern Ireland) NIR | Pat McCourt | 8 | 0 | 3+3 | 0 | 0+0 | 0 | 0+1 | 0 | 1+0 | 0 |
| 23 | FW | (England) ENG | Leighton McGivern | 30 | 1 | 2+23 | 1 | 0+2 | 0 | 0+1 | 0 | 0+2 | 0 |
| 15 | DF | (England) ENG | Ashley Probets | 12 | 0 | 4+5 | 0 | 0+0 | 0 | 1+0 | 0 | 0+2 | 0 |
| 14 | FW | (England) ENG | Marc Richards | 5 | 2 | 4+1 | 2 | 0+0 | 0 | 0+0 | 0 | 0+0 | 0 |
| 22 | FW | (England) ENG | Marcus Richardson | 2 | 0 | 1+1 | 0 | 0+0 | 0 | 0+0 | 0 | 0+0 | 0 |
| 10 | FW | (England) ENG | Paul Tait | 42 | 3 | 27+9 | 2 | 3+0 | 0 | 1+0 | 1 | 2+0 | 0 |
| 19 | FW | (England) ENG | Kevin Townson | 1 | 0 | 1+0 | 0 | 0+0 | 0 | 0+0 | 0 | 0+0 | 0 |
| 29 | DF | (England) ENG | Scott Warner | 32 | 0 | 25+3 | 0 | 0+2 | 0 | 0+0 | 0 | 2+0 | 0 |
| 14 | MF | (England) ENG | Paul Weller | 5 | 0 | 5+0 | 0 | 0+0 | 0 | 0+0 | 0 | 0+0 | 0 |
| 26 | DF | (England) ENG | Matt Williams | 1 | 0 | 0+1 | 0 | 0+0 | 0 | 0+0 | 0 | 0+0 | 0 |

== League Two ==
| 7 August 2004 1 | Scunthorpe United | 3–1 | Rochdale | Scunthorpe |
| | Crosby (yellow card) 44'; Taylor 68'; Hayes 75'; Butler (yellow card) 81'; Sparrow 90' | Report | Brisco (yellow card) 30'; Bertos 45'; Goodall (yellow card) 56'; Tait (yellow card) 90' | Stadium: Glanford Park; Attendance: 4,409; Referee: Mike Russell |

| 10 August 2004 2 | Rochdale | 0–2 | Swansea City | Rochdale |
| | Goodall (yellow card) 20' | Report | Nugent 21'; Robinson 61'; Tate (yellow card) 71' | Stadium: Spotland Stadium; Attendance: 2,514; Referee: Andy Penn |

| 14 August 2004 3 | Rochdale | 2–0 | Southend United | Rochdale |
| | Jones 3', 60' (pen.); Holt (yellow card) 32'; Bertos (red card) 54'; Goodall (yellow card) 60' | Report | Maher (yellow card) 30'; Bentley (yellow card) 55'; Dudfield (yellow card) 83' | Stadium: Spotland Stadium; Attendance: 2,218; Referee: Russell Booth |

| 21 August 2004 4 | Wycombe Wanderers | 0–3 | Rochdale | High Wycombe |
| | | Report | Cash (yellow card) 45'; Holt (yellow card) 60' (goal) 70'; Jones 89' (pen.); McGivern 90' (yellow card) 90' | Stadium: Adams Park; Attendance: 4,440; Referee: Keith Stroud |

| 28 August 2004 5 | Rochdale | 0–3 | Bury | Rochdale |
| | Heald (yellow card) 26'; McGivern (yellow card) 65' | Report | Nugent (yellow card) 26' (goal) 77'; Mattis 27'; Swailes 52' | Stadium: Spotland Stadium; Attendance: 3,913; Referee: Graham Salisbury |

| 30 August 2004 6 | Leyton Orient | 2–1 | Rochdale | London |
| | Steele 26'; Newey 77' | Report | Holt 70'; Bertos (yellow card) 84' | Stadium: Brisbane Road; Attendance: 3,243; Referee: Trevor Parkes |

| 4 September 2004 7 | Grimsby Town | 0–1 | Rochdale | Cleethorpes |
| | Whittle (yellow card) 36'; Reddy (yellow card) 62'; Crowe (yellow card) 76' | Report | Griffiths (yellow card) 38'; Gallimore (yellow card) 61'; Holt 80' | Stadium: Blundell Park; Attendance: 4,795; Referee: Andy Woolmer |

| 11 September 2004 8 | Rochdale | 1–1 | Darlington | Rochdale |
| | Holt 30'; Brisco (yellow card) 64'; Tait (yellow card) 74'; McGivern (yellow card) 90' | Report | Liddle (yellow card) 13'; Hignett 87'; Wainwright (yellow card) 89' | Stadium: Spotland Stadium; Attendance: 2,616; Referee: Paul Melin |

| 18 September 2004 9 | Mansfield Town | 1–0 | Rochdale | Mansfield |
| | Larkin 85'; Murray (yellow card) 86' | Report | Griffiths (yellow card) 42'; Goodall (yellow card) 67'; Tait (yellow card) 90' | Stadium: Field Mill; Attendance: 4,266; Referee: Jarnail Singh |

| 25 September 2004 10 | Rochdale | 0–3 | Notts County | Rochdale |
| | Cooksey (yellow card) 17' | Report | Wilson (yellow card) 25'; Hurst 40', 65', 90' | Stadium: Spotland Stadium; Attendance: 2,370; Referee: Mark Cowburn |

| 2 October 2004 11 | Rushden & Diamonds | 0–0 | Rochdale | Irthlingborough |
| | Allen (yellow card) 71' | Report | Holt (yellow card) 73' | Stadium: Nene Park; Attendance: 2,619; Referee: Phil Joslin |

| 8 October 2004 12 | Rochdale | 2–1 | Yeovil Town | Rochdale |
| | Bertos (yellow card) 58'; Holt 68' (yellow card) 90'; Burgess (yellow card) 71'; Jones 82'; Tait (yellow card) 90' | Report | Jevons 48' | Stadium: Spotland Stadium; Attendance: 2,402; Referee: Nigel Miller |

| 16 October 2004 13 | Rochdale | 1–2 | Cheltenham Town | Rochdale |
| | Weller (yellow card) 66'; Jones 88' (pen.) (yellow card) 90' | Report | McCann (yellow card) 46'; Vincent (yellow card) 61'; Melligan 63'; Wilson 84' (yellow card) 90' | Stadium: Spotland Stadium; Attendance: 2,778; Referee: Clive Oliver |

| 19 October 2004 14 | Lincoln City | 1–1 | Rochdale | Lincoln |
| | Bloomer 50' | Report | Jones (yellow card) 27'; Clarke 86' | Stadium: Sincil Bank; Attendance: 3,274; Referee: Kevin Friend |

| 23 October 2004 15 | Northampton Town | 5–1 | Rochdale | Northampton |
| | Burgess 9' (o.g.); Smith 21' (pen.), 28'; Edwards 63' (o.g.); Low 90'; Chambers (yellow card) 90' | Report | Jones (yellow card) 19'; Gallimore (yellow card) 27'; Griffiths 77'; Bertos (yellow card) 87' | Stadium: Sixfields Stadium; Attendance: 5,342; Referee: Joe Ross |

| 30 October 2004 16 | Rochdale | 3–0 | Macclesfield Town | Rochdale |
| | Holt 42' (yellow card) 70'; Cooksey 55'; Jones 67' | Report | Widdrington (yellow card) 66' | Stadium: Spotland Stadium; Attendance: 2,704; Referee: Darren Drysdale |

| 6 November 2004 17 | Rochdale | 2–1 | Cambridge United | Rochdale |
| | Burgess (yellow card) 8' (yellow-red card) 34'; Holt 31', 83' | Report | Easter (yellow card) 3'; Konte (yellow card) 17' (goal) 47'; Duncan (yellow card) 75'; Chillingworth (yellow card) 81'; Walker (yellow card) 86' (yellow-red card) 89' | Stadium: Spotland Stadium; Attendance: 2,353; Referee: Ray Olivier |

| 20 November 2004 18 | Oxford United | 0–1 | Rochdale | Oxford |
| | | Report | Cooksey (yellow card) 62'; Goodall (yellow card) 66'; Tardif 90' (o.g.) | Stadium: Kassam Stadium; Attendance: 4,204; Referee: Lee Probert |

| 27 November 2004 19 | Rochdale | 2–0 | Boston United | Rochdale |
| | Griffiths (yellow card) 47'; Cooksey (yellow card) 51' (goal) 84'; Bertos 62'; Holt (yellow card) 70' | Report | Ellender (yellow card) 33'; Greaves (yellow card) 86'; Noble (yellow card) 86' | Stadium: Spotland Stadium; Attendance: 2,474; Referee: Phil Prosser |

| 7 December 2004 20 | Shrewsbury Town | 0–2 | Rochdale | Shrewsbury |
| | | Report | Tait 53'; Griffiths (yellow card) 61'; Holt 66'; Cooksey (yellow card) 74' | Stadium: Gay Meadow; Attendance: 3,677; Referee: Steve Tanner |

| 11 December 2004 21 | Kidderminster Harriers | 2–1 | Rochdale | Kidderminster |
| | Keates 5'; Beswetherick (yellow card) 57'; Foster 69' (pen.); Hatswell (yellow card) 77'; Beardsley (yellow card) 87' | Report | Holt 36'; McGivern (yellow card) 86'; Griffiths (yellow card) 90' | Stadium: Aggborough Stadium; Attendance: 2,337; Referee: Paul Danson |

| 18 December 2004 22 | Rochdale | 0–0 | Bristol Rovers | Rochdale |
| | Tait (yellow card) 39'; Holt (yellow card) 46'; Jones (yellow card) 86' | Report | | Stadium: Spotland Stadium; Attendance: 2,623; Referee: Eddie Ilderton |

| 26 December 2004 23 | Darlington | 0–3 | Rochdale | Darlington |
| | Fleming (yellow card) 37'; Webster (yellow card) 77' | Report | Atieno 18'; Holt 62', 78' | Stadium: The Darlington Arena; Attendance: 7,028; Referee: Michael Jones |

| 28 December 2004 24 | Rochdale | 2–2 | Chester City | Rochdale |
| 15:00 GMT | Atieno (yellow card) 30' (goal) 64'; Goodall (yellow card) 37'; Bertos 58' | Report | Ellison 6'; Branch (yellow card) 45' (goal) 83'; Belle (yellow card) 69'; Harris (yellow card) 90' | Stadium: Spotland Stadium; Attendance: 3,724; Referee: Tony Leake |

| 3 January 2005 25 | Notts County | 0–0 | Rochdale | Nottingham |
| 15:00 GMT | Ullathorne (yellow card) 46'; Whitlow (yellow card) 71' | Report | Bertos (yellow card) 26'; Cooksey (red card) 45'; Griffiths (yellow card) 35' (yellow-red card) 75' | Stadium: Meadow Lane; Attendance: 5,258; Referee: Carl Boyeson |

| 15 January 2005 26 | Rochdale | 1–1 | Mansfield Town | Rochdale |
| | Tait 4'; Heald (yellow card) 40'; Holt (yellow card) 43' | Report | Barker 38'; Dimech (yellow card) 43' | Stadium: Spotland Stadium; Attendance: 2,576; Referee: Colin Webster |

| 22 January 2005 27 | Chester City | 0–0 | Rochdale | Chester |
| | Carden (red card) 70'; Drummond (yellow card) 75'; Branch (yellow card) 80'; Belle (red card) 83' | Report | Jones (yellow card) 62' | Stadium: Deva Stadium; Attendance: 2,985; Referee: Kevin Wright |

| 25 January 2005 28 | Yeovil Town | 2–2 | Rochdale | Yeovil |
| | Tarachulski (yellow card) 44' (goal) 54'; Johnson 85' (pen.) | Report | Goodall 8'; Heald (yellow card) 63'; Tait (yellow card) 68'; Bertos 77' | Stadium: Huish Park; Attendance: 5,180; Referee: Paul Armstrong |

| 29 January 2005 29 | Rochdale | 2–0 | Rushden & Diamonds | Rochdale |
| | Cooksey 56'; Goodall (yellow card) 62'; Warner (yellow card) 62'; Holt 82' | Report | Sharp (yellow card) 13'; Connelly (yellow card) 79'; Hawkins (yellow card) 84' | Stadium: Spotland Stadium; Attendance: 2,664; Referee: Graham Laws |

| 5 February 2005 30 | Cheltenham Town | 2–0 | Rochdale | Cheltenham |
| | Devaney 20', 89'; Caines (yellow card) 85'; Odejayi (yellow card) 90' | Report | Holt (yellow card) 70'; Goodall (yellow card) 78'; Evans (red card) 89' | Stadium: Whaddon Road; Attendance: 2,951; Referee: Jarnail Singh |

| 12 February 2005 31 | Rochdale | 3–1 | Lincoln City | Rochdale |
| | Holt 7' (yellow card) 48'; Cooksey (red card) 23'; Heald 59'; Goodall 74' | Report | Yeo 24' (pen.); McAuley (yellow card) 43' | Stadium: Spotland Stadium; Attendance: 2,847; Referee: Russell Booth |

| 19 February 2005 32 | Macclesfield Town | 3–0 | Rochdale | Macclesfield |
| | Tipton 8', 12', 90' (yellow card) 52'; Morley (yellow card) 43' | Report | Griffiths (yellow card) 6' | Stadium: Moss Rose; Attendance: 3,031; Referee: Mike Pike |

| 26 February 2005 33 | Rochdale | 1–1 | Kidderminster Harriers | Rochdale |
| | Lambert 40' (yellow card) 72'; Warner (yellow card) 59' | Report | Beardsley 18'; Mullins (yellow card) 53' | Stadium: Spotland Stadium; Attendance: 2,385; Referee: Ray Olivier |

| 1 March 2005 34 | Rochdale | 2–0 | Grimsby Town | Rochdale |
| | Lambert 27'; Goodall (yellow card) 33'; Holt (yellow card) 64'; Evans (red card) 65'; Jones 90' (yellow card) 90' | Report | Crowe (yellow card) 43'; Ramsden (yellow card) 44'; Pinault (yellow card) 50'; Soames (yellow card) 83' | Stadium: Spotland Stadium; Attendance: 2,312; Referee: Phil Prosser |

| 5 March 2005 35 | Bristol Rovers | 0–0 | Rochdale | Bristol |
| | Elliott (yellow card) 19'; Ryan (yellow card) 49' | Report | | Stadium: Memorial Stadium; Attendance: 5,464; Referee: Andy Penn |

| 8 March 2005 36 | Rochdale | 1–0 | Northampton Town | Rochdale |
| | Lambert 56'; Warner (yellow card) 63'; Bertos (yellow card) 70'; Tait (yellow card) 78' | Report | Hearn (yellow card) 21'; Rowson (yellow card) 58' | Stadium: Spotland Stadium; Attendance: 2,107; Referee: Tony Bates |

| 12 March 2005 37 | Swansea City | 2–2 | Rochdale | Swansea |
| | Trundle (red card) 37'; Gurney 46'; Holt 52' (o.g.) | Report | Holt 31' (yellow card) 55'; Griffiths (yellow card) 35'; Tait (red card) 38'; Lambert 90' | Stadium: Vetch Field; Attendance: 6,804; Referee: Trevor Parkes |

| 19 March 2005 38 | Rochdale | 0–0 | Scunthorpe United | Rochdale |
| | McGivern (yellow card) 80' | Report | Beagrie (yellow card) 58' | Stadium: Spotland Stadium; Attendance: 3,605; Referee: Graham Laws |

| 25 March 2005 39 | Southend United | 3–0 | Rochdale | Southend-on-Sea |
| 15:00 GMT | Eastwood 44'; Bentley 55'; Gray 60' | Report | | Stadium: Roots Hall; Attendance: 7,656; Referee: Grant Hegley |

| 28 March 2005 40 | Rochdale | 1–1 | Wycombe Wanderers | Rochdale |
| 15:00 GMT | Jones 16' (pen.); Holt (yellow card) 62' | Report | Tyson 47' | Stadium: Spotland Stadium; Attendance: 2,707; Referee: Andy Woolmer |

| 2 April 2005 41 | Bury | 0–0 | Rochdale | Bury |
| | | Report | | Stadium: Gigg Lane; Attendance: 4,606; Referee: Chris Foy |

| 9 April 2005 42 | Rochdale | 2–0 | Leyton Orient | Rochdale |
| | Richards 47', 59' | Report | Simpson (yellow card) 76'; Wallis (yellow card) 88' | Stadium: Spotland Stadium; Attendance: 2,255; Referee: Carl Boyeson |

| 16 April 2005 43 | Rochdale | 1–1 | Shrewsbury Town | Rochdale |
| | Cooksey (yellow card) 30'; Lambert 40'; Richards (yellow card) 86' | Report | Sheron 6'; Tolley (yellow card) 31' | Stadium: Spotland Stadium; Attendance: 3,142; Referee: Alan Kaye |

| 23 April 2005 44 | Cambridge United | 0–0 | Rochdale | Cambridge |
| | | Report | McGivern (yellow card) 88'; Gallimore (yellow card) 90' | Stadium: Abbey Stadium; Attendance: 3,738; Referee: Joe Ross |

| 30 April 2005 45 | Rochdale | 5–1 | Oxford United | Rochdale |
| | Heald 3'; Cooksey 11'; Holt 14', 69'; Lambert 25'; Bertos (yellow card) 83' | Report | Hackett (yellow card) 27'; Cominelli (yellow card) 74'; Robinson 81' | Stadium: Spotland Stadium; Attendance: 2,579; Referee: Mark Warren |

| 7 May 2005 46 | Boston United | 1–1 | Rochdale | Boston |
| | Pitt 71' | Report | Holt (yellow card) 14'; Gallimore (yellow card) 37'; Cooksey 50' | Stadium: York Street; Attendance: 2,528; Referee: Andy Hall |

== FA Cup ==
| 13 November 2004 1 | Rochdale | 2–1 | Oxford United | Rochdale |
| | Holt 36', 90' | Report | Bradbury 20'; Mackay (yellow card) 90' | Stadium: Spotland Stadium; Attendance: 2,333; Referee: Eddie Ilderton |

| 4 December 2004 2 | Stevenage Borough | 0–2 | Rochdale | Stevenage |
| | Brough (yellow card) 32'; Bulman (yellow card) 36'; Rogers (yellow card) 59'; Laker (yellow card) 69'; Woodman (red card) 88' | Report | Holt 70', 90' (yellow card) 51' | Stadium: Broadhall Way; Attendance: 2,700; Referee: Jarnail Singh |

| 8 January 2005 3 | Charlton Athletic | 4–1 | Rochdale | London |
| | Hughes 19', 56'; Fortune 44'; Murphy 64' | Report | Holt 51'; Burgess (yellow card) 63' | Stadium: The Valley; Attendance: 13,955; Referee: Richard Beeby |

== League Cup ==
| 23 August 2004 1 | Rochdale | 2–4 | Wolverhampton Wanderers | Rochdale |
| | Holt 4' (yellow card) 66'; Tait 26' | Report | Ince 42'; Clarke 53'; Miller 60'; Andrews 78' | Stadium: Spotland Stadium; Attendance: 3,292; Referee: Paul Robinson |

== League Trophy ==
| 28 September 2004 1 | Rochdale | 4–1 | Scarborough | Rochdale |
| | Griffiths 3', 77', 90' (pen.); Holt 75' | Report | Gilroy 45' (yellow card) 86'; Senior (yellow card) 49'; Hotte (yellow card) 76'; Walker (red card) 90' | Stadium: Spotland Stadium; Attendance: 837; Referee: Eddie Ilderton |

| 2 November 2004 2 | Chester City | 1–0 | Rochdale | Chester |
| | Bolland (yellow card) 44'; Rapley (yellow card) 45'; Hessey 54' | Report | Griffiths (yellow card) 45'; Cooksey (yellow card) 76' | Stadium: Deva Stadium; Attendance: 1,419; Referee: Paul Danson |
