= 2005–06 Rochdale A.F.C. season =

English football club season

Rochdale
2005–06 season
- Chairman: David Kilpatrick
- Manager: Steve Parkin
- League Two: 14th
- FA Cup: First round
- League Cup: First round
- Football League Trophy: Second round
- Top goalscorer: League: Rickie Lambert (22 goals); All: Rickie Lambert (22 goals)

The 2005–06 season was Rochdale A.F.C.'s 99th in existence and their 32nd consecutive in the fourth tier of the English football league (League Two). Rochdale finished the season in 14th place.

== Statistics ==
No.	Pos	Nat	Player	Total		League Two		FA Cup		League Cup		League Trophy	
No.	Pos	Nat	Player	Apps	Goals	Apps	Goals	Apps	Goals	Apps	Goals	Apps	Goals
1	GK	(Scotland) SCO	Matt Gilks	50	0	46 + 0	0	1 + 0	0	1 + 0	0	2 + 0	0
2	DF	(South Africa) RSA	Warren Goodhind	12	0	10 + 0	0	1 + 0	0	0 + 0	0	1 + 0	0
3	DF	(England) ENG	Tony Gallimore	37	0	32 + 2	0	1 + 0	0	1 + 0	0	1 + 0	0
4	MF	(England) ENG	Ernie Cooksey	37	3	27 + 7	3	1 + 0	0	1 + 0	0	0 + 1	0
5	DF	(Wales) WAL	Gareth Griffiths	31	2	29 + 0	2	0 + 0	0	0 + 0	0	2 + 0	0
6	DF	(England) ENG	Jon Boardman	24	1	17 + 4	1	0 + 0	0	1 + 0	0	2 + 0	0
7	MF	(England) ENG	Lee Cartwright	29	1	21 + 6	1	0 + 0	0	1 + 0	0	1 + 0	0
8	MF	(England) ENG	Neil Brisco	17	0	14 + 2	0	0 + 0	0	0 + 0	0	1 + 0	0
9	FW	(England) ENG	Chris Dagnall	21	3	15 + 6	3	0 + 0	0	0 + 0	0	0 + 0	0
9	FW	(England) ENG	Grant Holt	24	15	21 + 0	14	1 + 0	0	1 + 0	0	1 + 0	1
10	FW	(England) ENG	Iyseden Christie	14	2	10 + 4	2	0 + 0	0	0 + 0	0	0 + 0	0
10	FW	(England) ENG	Paul Tait	13	3	4 + 7	1	0 + 1	0	0 + 0	0	1 + 0	2
11	MF	(England) ENG	Gary Jones	46	4	42 + 0	4	1 + 0	0	1 + 0	0	2 + 0	0
12	DF	(England) ENG	Alan Goodall	44	3	37 + 3	3	1 + 0	0	1 + 0	0	2 + 0	0
14	DF	(England) ENG	Scott Warner	26	1	16 + 8	1	0 + 1	0	0 + 0	0	1 + 0	0
15	DF	(England) ENG	Rory McArdle	20	1	16 + 3	1	1 + 0	0	0 + 0	0	0 + 0	0
15	MF	(England) ENG	Joe Thompson	1	0	0 + 1	0	0 + 0	0	0 + 0	0	0 + 0	0
16	MF	(England) ENG	Tommy Jaszczun	19	0	12 + 5	0	1 + 0	0	1 + 0	0	0 + 0	0
17	FW	(England) ENG	Rickie Lambert	50	22	43 + 3	22	1 + 0	0	1 + 0	0	2 + 0	0
18	DF	(England) ENG	Jamie Clark	26	0	21 + 1	0	1 + 0	0	1 + 0	0	1 + 1	0
18	DF	(England) ENG	Simon Ramsden	15	1	15 + 0	1	0 + 0	0	0 + 0	0	0 + 0	0
19	FW	(Scotland) SCO	Blair Sturrock	35	6	15 + 16	6	0 + 1	0	0 + 1	0	1 + 1	0
20	FW	(England) ENG	Clive Moyo-Modise	9	0	1 + 8	0	0 + 0	0	0 + 0	0	0 + 0	0
21	MF	(England) ENG	Ben Kitchen	9	0	3 + 5	0	0 + 0	0	0 + 0	0	0 + 1	0
22	MF	(England) ENG	John Doolan	18	0	16 + 2	0	0 + 0	0	0 + 0	0	0 + 0	0
24	DF	(England) ENG	Mark Jackson	12	0	12 + 0	0	0 + 0	0	0 + 0	0	0 + 0	0
25	DF	(England) ENG	Dave Bayliss	4	0	4 + 0	0	0 + 0	0	0 + 0	0	0 + 0	0
25	DF	(England) ENG	Theo Coleman	1	0	1 + 0	0	0 + 0	0	0 + 0	0	0 + 0	0
27	DF	(England) ENG	Gary Brown	17	0	6 + 10	0	0 + 0	0	0 + 0	0	1 + 0	0

== League Two ==
6 August 2005 1	Shrewsbury Town	0–1	Rochdale	Shrewsbury
BST	Cowan (yellow card) 37'	Report	Holt 15' (yellow card) 89'	Stadium: Gay Meadow; Attendance: 4,927; Referee: Jonathan Moss

9 August 2005 2	Rochdale	1–2	Wycombe Wanderers	Rochdale
BST	Jones 79' (pen.); Holt (yellow card) 80'	Report	Williamson 7'; Bloomfield 23'; Tyson (yellow card) 52'	Stadium: Spotland Stadium; Attendance: 2,755; Referee: Paul Robinson

13 August 2005 3	Rochdale	1–1	Cheltenham Town	Rochdale
BST	Brisco (red card) 28'; Lambert 53'	Report	Spencer 37'	Stadium: Spotland Stadium; Attendance: 2,344; Referee: Gary Sutton

20 August 2005 4	Leyton Orient	1–4	Rochdale	London
BST	Mackie (yellow card) 45'; Lockwood (yellow card) 72'; Echanomi 76'	Report	Holt 24'; Lambert 29', 68'; Clarke (yellow card) 63'; Goodall 74' (yellow card) 79'	Stadium: Brisbane Road; Attendance: 4,223; Referee: Pat Miller

27 August 2005 5	Rochdale	3–1	Macclesfield Town	Rochdale
BST	Holt 31', 76'; Goodall 33'; Clarke (yellow card) 69'	Report	Sandwith (yellow card) 20'; Townson 24'	Stadium: Spotland Stadium; Attendance: 2,606; Referee: Eddie Ilderton

29 August 2005 6	Darlington	2–1	Rochdale	Darlington
BST	Johnson 36'; Clarke (red card) 59'; Logan 69'; Sodje (yellow card) 86'	Report	Jaszczun (yellow card) 24'; Holt 61' (pen.)	Stadium: The Darlington Arena; Attendance: 4,318; Referee: Clive Oliver

3 September 2005 7	Rochdale	4–1	Torquay United	Rochdale
BST	Brisco (yellow card) 8'; Lambert 14', 67'; Warner 22'; Holt 54' (pen.)	Report	Connell 16'; Sharp (yellow card) 31'; Taylor (red card) 52'; Garner (yellow card) 69'	Stadium: Spotland Stadium; Attendance: 2,388; Referee: Phil Joslin

10 September 2005 8	Boston United	3–2	Rochdale	Boston
BST	Ellender (yellow card) 5'; Whelan 8', 58' (pen.) (yellow card) 60'; White 76'	Report	Holt 16'; Griffiths 53'; Brisco (yellow card) 60'; Gallimore (yellow card) 78'	Stadium: York Street; Attendance: 2,274; Referee: Andy Penn

17 September 2005 9	Rochdale	2–0	Mansfield Town	Rochdale
BST	Sturrock 25'; Holt 83'	Report	Uhlenbeek (yellow card) 61'; Hjelde (red card) 66'	Stadium: Spotland Stadium; Attendance: 2,965; Referee: Michael Jones

24 September 2005 10	Barnet	1–1	Rochdale	Barnet
BST	Strevens (yellow card) 58'; Batt (yellow card) 69'; Grazioli 87'; Hatch (yellow card) 88'	Report	Holt 36' (yellow card) 85'; Brown (yellow card) 77'	Stadium: Underhill Stadium; Attendance: 2,338; Referee: Keith Stroud

27 September 2005 11	Rochdale	0–1	Oxford United	Rochdale
BST	McArdle (yellow card) 3'; Clarke (yellow card) 63'; Holt (yellow card) 90'	Report	Quinn 60'; Mansell (yellow card) 85'; Roget (yellow card) 90'	Stadium: Spotland Stadium; Attendance: 2,347; Referee: Andy Woolmer

1 October 2005 12	Rochdale	2–1	Rushden & Diamonds	Rochdale
BST	Sturrock 45'; Boardman 90'	Report	Broughton (yellow card) 33'; Young (yellow card) 41'; Okuonghae 50'	Stadium: Spotland Stadium; Attendance: 2,606; Referee: Rob Lewis

7 October 2005 13	Chester City	2–3	Rochdale	Chester
BST	Dimech (yellow card) 20'; Drummond 54'; Davies 57'; Curtis (yellow card) 64'; Bertos (yellow card) 90'; Regan (yellow card) 90'	Report	Gilks (yellow card) 2'; Jones 40'; Lambert (yellow card) 61'; Holt 69'; Lambert 85'	Stadium: Deva Stadium; Attendance: 4,327; Referee: Darren Drysdale

15 October 2005 14	Rochdale	3–0	Notts County	Rochdale
BST	Lambert 4', 12'; Cartwright 20'; Goodhind (yellow card) 45'; Jones (yellow card) 89'	Report		Stadium: Spotland Stadium; Attendance: 3,348; Referee: Graham Salisbury

22 October 2005 15	Peterborough United	3–1	Rochdale	Peterborough
BST	Newton (yellow card) 6'; Crow 54', 73'; Burton (yellow card) 60' (goal) 68' (pen.)	Report	Holt 28' (pen.) (yellow card) 61'; Griffiths (yellow card) 33'; Gallimore (yellow card) 75'	Stadium: London Road Stadium; Attendance: 4,314; Referee: Darren Deadman

29 October 2005 16	Rochdale	1–2	Lincoln City	Rochdale
BST	Cooksey (yellow card) 23' (goal) 54'; Goodall (yellow card) 24'; Griffiths (red card) 31'; Holt (yellow card) 80'	Report	Robinson 15'; Keates (yellow card) 23'; Brown 36'	Stadium: Spotland Stadium; Attendance: 3,420; Referee: Russell Booth

12 November 2005 17	Bristol Rovers	1–2	Rochdale	Bristol
GMT	Leary (yellow card) 37'; Agogo 38'	Report	Holt 31' (pen.); Sturrock 66'	Stadium: Memorial Stadium; Attendance: 6,042; Referee: Jarnail Singh

19 November 2005 18	Rochdale	2–2	Chester City	Rochdale
GMT	Sturrock 69'; Brown (yellow card) 74'; Lambert 82'	Report	Bolland 20' (yellow card) 79'; Curtis (yellow card) 30'; Davies 64'	Stadium: Spotland Stadium; Attendance: 3,618; Referee: Nigel Miller

26 November 2005 19	Rochdale	4–3	Shrewsbury Town	Rochdale
GMT	Holt 6' (pen.), 78'; Brisco (yellow card) 27'; Lambert 47', 81'; Brown (yellow card) 55' (yellow-red card) 83'	Report	McMenamin 3'; Cowan 9' (yellow card) 85'; Ashton (yellow card) 29'; Stallard 42'	Stadium: Spotland Stadium; Attendance: 2,845; Referee: Brian Curson

6 December 2005 20	Grimsby Town	4–1	Rochdale	Cleethorpes
GMT	G. Jones 67'; Cohen 70'; R. Jones 74'; Reddy 90'	Report	Lambert 27'	Stadium: Blundell Park; Attendance: 3,896; Referee: Mike Thorpe

10 December 2005 21	Wycombe Wanderers	3–0	Rochdale	Wycombe
GMT	Mooney 9', 53'; Griffin 85'	Report	Goodhind (yellow card) 27' (yellow-red card) 57'; Jones (yellow card) 56'; Goodall (yellow card) 63'; Holt (red card) 69'	Stadium: Adams Park; Attendance: 4,928; Referee: Darren Deadman

17 December 2005 22	Rochdale	2–4	Leyton Orient	Rochdale
GMT	Jones (yellow card) 22'; Goodall 24'; Sturrock 65'; Lambert (yellow card) 73'	Report	Alexander 10', 47'; Tudor 35' (yellow card) 36' (yellow-red card) 44'; Mackie 76'; Easton (yellow card) 85'	Stadium: Spotland Stadium; Attendance: 2,666; Referee: Graham Salisbury

26 December 2005 23	Wrexham	2–1	Rochdale	Wrexham
GMT	Ferguson (yellow card) 12' (goal) 65'; Crowell 41' (pen.)	Report	Cooksey (yellow card) 17'; Tait 21'	Stadium: Racecourse Ground; Attendance: 5,127; Referee: Gary Sutton

31 December 2005 24	Carlisle United	2–1	Rochdale	Carlisle
GMT	Billy (yellow card) 16'; Livesey 60'; Bridges 80'	Report	Sturrock 2'	Stadium: Brunton Park; Attendance: 6,897; Referee: Paul Robinson

2 January 2006 25	Rochdale	1–1	Northampton Town	Rochdale
GMT	Goodall (yellow card) 31'; Low 71' (o.g.); Jones (yellow card) 74'	Report	Bojic 49'; Kirk (yellow card) 70'	Stadium: Spotland Stadium; Attendance: 3,030; Referee: Phil Joslin

14 January 2006 26	Rochdale	0–1	Stockport County	Rochdale
GMT	Goodhind (yellow card) 19'; Boardman (yellow card) 31'	Report	Easter 8'; Dickinson (yellow card) 86'	Stadium: Spotland Stadium; Attendance: 3,520; Referee: Neil Swarbrick

21 January 2006 27	Mansfield Town	1–0	Rochdale	Mansfield
GMT	Reet 40'	Report	Dagnall (yellow card) 42'; Griffiths (yellow card) 78'	Stadium: Field Mill; Attendance: 3,018; Referee: Darren Deadman

24 January 2006 28	Torquay United	1–3	Rochdale	Torquay
GMT	Sako 55'	Report	Jones (yellow card) 26' (goal) 48'; Dagnall 29'; Griffiths (yellow card) 50'; Lambert 68'; McArdle (yellow card) 78'	Stadium: Plainmoor; Attendance: 2,043; Referee: Jarnail Singh

28 January 2006 29	Rochdale	1–1	Boston United	Rochdale
GMT	Doolan (yellow card) 16'; Griffiths 30'	Report	Keene 8'; Silk (yellow card) 16'; Holland (yellow card) 80'	Stadium: Spotland Stadium; Attendance: 2,384; Referee: Colin Webster

4 February 2006 30	Oxford United	1–1	Rochdale	Oxford
GMT	Ashton 17'	Report	Griffiths (yellow card) 13'; Ramsden (yellow card) 30'; Cooksey 45' (yellow card) 45'	Stadium: Kassam Stadium; Attendance: 3,978; Referee: Trevor Parkes

14 February 2006 31	Stockport County	3–0	Rochdale	Stockport
GMT	Boshell 27'; Griffin 33'; Briggs 88'	Report		Stadium: Edgeley Park; Attendance: 4,312; Referee: Russell Booth

25 February 2006 32	Cheltenham Town	1–1	Rochdale	Cheltenham
GMT	Guinan 43'	Report	Lambert 82'	Stadium: Whaddon Road; Attendance: 3,184; Referee: Dean Whitestone

28 February 2006 33	Rochdale	1–1	Bury	Rochdale
GMT	Lambert 70' (pen.)	Report	Youngs 61'	Stadium: Spotland Stadium; Attendance: 3,876; Referee: Tony Leake

11 March 2006 34	Macclesfield Town	1–3	Rochdale	Macclesfield
GMT	Miles 56'; Harsley (yellow card) 58'	Report	McArdle 27'; Christie 49'; Jones (yellow card) 74'; Lambert 83'	Stadium: Moss Rose; Attendance: 2,211; Referee: Gary Lewis

18 March 2006 35	Rochdale	0–1	Wrexham	Rochdale
GMT	Bayliss (yellow card) 30' (yellow-red card) 62'; Doolan (yellow card) 55'	Report	Derbyshire 20'; Williams (yellow card) 85'; Bennett (yellow card) 87'	Stadium: Spotland Stadium; Attendance: 2,856; Referee: Mike Russell

21 March 2006 36	Rochdale	2–2	Grimsby Town	Rochdale
GMT	Jackson (yellow card) 23'; Ramsden 52'; Lambert 90'	Report	Toner 24' (pen.); Futcher (yellow card) 35'; Reddy (yellow card) 80'; Bolland 82'; Newey (yellow card) 90'	Stadium: Spotland Stadium; Attendance: 1,865; Referee: Keith Hill

25 March 2006 37	Bury	2–1	Rochdale	Bury
GMT	Youngs 33'; Gobern 48'; Barry-Murphy (yellow card) 80'	Report	Doolan (yellow card) 61'; Jones 71'	Stadium: Gigg Lane; Attendance: 4,276; Referee: Paul Robinson

4 April 2006 38	Rochdale	0–2	Darlington	Rochdale
BST	Goodall (yellow card) 73'	Report	Cooke 34'; Johnson (yellow card) 61' (goal) 66'; Kendrick (yellow card) 66'	Stadium: Spotland Stadium; Attendance: 1,963; Referee: Rob Lewis

8 April 2006 39	Northampton Town	2–2	Rochdale	Northampton
BST	Low 6'; McGleish 35'	Report	Lambert 51', 90' (pen.); Cooksey (yellow card) 66'	Stadium: Sixfields Stadium; Attendance: 5,732; Referee: Jarnail Singh

15 April 2006 40	Rushden & Diamonds	1–1	Rochdale	Irthlingborough
BST	Caskey (yellow card) 23'; Hatswell (yellow card) 25'; Broughton (yellow card) 32' (goal) 55'; Bull (yellow card) 67'	Report	Dagnall 90'	Stadium: Nene Park; Attendance: 3,135; Referee: Mick Fletcher

17 April 2006 41	Rochdale	1–0	Peterborough United	Rochdale
BST	Lambert (yellow card) 57'; Christie 72'	Report		Stadium: Spotland Stadium; Attendance: 2,318; Referee: Eddie Ilderton

22 April 2006 42	Notts County	1–1	Rochdale	Nottingham
BST	Needham (yellow card) 44'; Doyle (yellow card) 54'; Martin 72'; Baudet (yellow card) 81'	Report	Lambert 81' (pen.)	Stadium: Meadow Lane; Attendance: 4,413; Referee: Graham Salisbury

25 April 2006 43	Rochdale	1–1	Barnet	Rochdale
BST	Dagnall 23' (yellow card) 90'; Griffiths (yellow card) 27'	Report	Hendon 28' (pen.); Hatch (yellow card) 68'; Hessenthaler (yellow card) 69'; Kandol (yellow card) 89'	Stadium: Spotland Stadium; Attendance: 1,769; Referee: Carl Boyeson

29 April 2006 44	Rochdale	2–0	Bristol Rovers	Rochdale
BST	Lambert 45' (pen.); Cooksey 90'	Report	Hinton (red card) 45'	Stadium: Spotland Stadium; Attendance: 2,649; Referee: Scott Mathieson

2 May 2006 45	Rochdale	0–2	Carlisle United	Rochdale
BST	Griffiths (yellow card) 63'	Report	Billy (yellow card) 25'; Livesey 36'; Murphy 44'	Stadium: Spotland Stadium; Attendance: 4,439; Referee: Michael Jones

6 May 2006 46	Lincoln City	1–1	Rochdale	Lincoln
BST	McAuley 72'	Report	Lambert 88'	Stadium: Sincil Bank; Attendance: 7,165; Referee: Ray Olivier

== FA Cup ==
5 November 2005 1	Rochdale	0–1	Brentford	Rochdale
GMT	Goodhind (yellow card) 30'; Gallimore (yellow card) 54'	Report	O'Connor 45' (pen.)	Stadium: Spotland Stadium; Attendance: 2,928; Referee: Jonathan Moss

== League Cup ==
23 August 2005 1	Rochdale	0–5	Bradford City	Rochdale
BST	Holt (yellow card) 51'; Cartwright (yellow card) 55'; Jones (red card) 73'	Report	Windass 7', 67', 77'; Cadamarteri 40'; Petta (yellow card) 74'; Bridge-Wilkinson 82'	Stadium: Spotland Stadium; Attendance: 2,820; Referee: Carl Boyeson

== League Trophy ==
18 October 2005 1	Rochdale	3–1	Stockport County	Rochdale
BST	Raynes 7' (o.g.); Holt 21' (pen.); Gilks (yellow card) 50'; Griffin 58' (o.g.); Clarke (yellow card) 65'	Report	Goodhind 15' (o.g.); Dolan (yellow card) 20'; Greenwood (yellow card) 68'	Stadium: Spotland Stadium; Attendance: 1,683; Referee: Colin Webster

22 November 2005 2	Tranmere Rovers	3–2	Rochdale	Birkenhead
GMT	Facey 6'; Harrison 67'; Greenacre 74' (pen.)	Report	Tait 9', 40'	Stadium: Prenton Park; Attendance: 2,867; Referee: Graham Salisbury
