= 2005–06 Boston United F.C. season =

Boston United
2005–06 season
- Chairman: Jon Sotnick
- Manager: Steve Evans
- League Two: 11th
- FA Cup: Second round
- League Cup: First round
- Top goalscorer: League: All: Julian Joachim (16)
- Highest home attendance: 4,476 (vs. Lincoln City)
- Lowest home attendance: 1,924 (vs. Carlisle United)
- Average home league attendance: 2487
Home colours	Away colours	Third colours

During the 2005–06 English football season, Boston United competed in Football League Two.

== Season summary ==
Boston United managed an 11th-placed final finish in League Two.

== Squad ==
Squad at end of season

Note: Flags indicate national team as defined under FIFA eligibility rules; some limited exceptions apply. Players may hold more than one non-FIFA nationality.

No.	Pos.	Nation	Player
2	DF	ENG	Lee Canoville
3	DF	SCO	Austin McCann
4	DF	ENG	Paul Ellender (captain)
6	DF	ENG	Alan White
7	MF	ENG	Brad Maylett
10	MF	ENG	Jamie Clarke
11	MF	ENG	Chris Holland
12	MF	SCO	Simon Rusk
14	MF	ENG	David Galbraith
15	DF	ENG	Mark Greaves (vice-captain)
16	MF	ENG	Danny Thomas
17	MF	ENG	Stewart Talbot

No.	Pos.	Nation	Player
19	FW	ENG	Julian Joachim
20	MF	ENG	Steve Melton
21	MF	ENG	Rob Norris
22	FW	ENG	Peter Till (on loan from Birmingham City)
23	FW	ENG	Lawrie Dudfield
24	DF	ENG	Ashley Edkins
25	DF	ENG	Gary Silk (on loan from Portsmouth)
26	GK	ENG	Chris Wright
27	MF	ENG	Richard Chinn
30	GK	IRL	Conrad Logan (on loan from Leicester City)
40	MF	ENG	Paul Raynor (assistant-manager)

=== Left club during season ===
Note: Flags indicate national team as defined under FIFA eligibility rules; some limited exceptions apply. Players may hold more than one non-FIFA nationality.

No.	Pos.	Nation	Player
1	GK	ENG	Nathan Abbey (to Bristol City)
5	DF	ENG	Ben Futcher (to Grimsby Town)
8	MF	ENG	David Noble (to Bristol City)
8	MF	ENG	Asa Hall (on loan from Birmingham City)
9	FW	ENG	Jason Lee (to Northampton Town)
9	FW	ENG	Jermaine McSporran (on loan from Doncaster Rovers)
10	FW	ENG	Daryl Clare (to Crawley)

No.	Pos.	Nation	Player
10	FW	ENG	Francis Green (on loan from Lincoln City)
14	DF	ENG	Gavin Johnson (to Northampton Town)
18	FW	ENG	Noel Whelan (to Livingston)
22	MF	ENG	Ian Ross (on loan from Sheffield United)
25	GK	NED	Michel Kuipers (on loan from Brighton and Hove Albion)
27	FW	ENG	James Keene (on loan from Portsmouth)

== Competitions ==
=== League Two ===
==== League table ====
Pos	Team	Pld	W	D	L	GF	GA	GD	Pts
9	Peterborough United	46	17	11	18	57	49	+8	62
10	Shrewsbury Town	46	16	13	17	55	55	0	61
11	Boston United	46	15	16	15	50	60	−10	61
12	Bristol Rovers	46	17	9	20	59	67	−8	60
13	Wrexham	46	15	14	17	61	54	+7	59

Rules for classification: In the Football League goals scored (GF) takes precedence over goal difference (GD).
