= Gary Jones (footballer, born 1977) =

English footballer (born 1977)

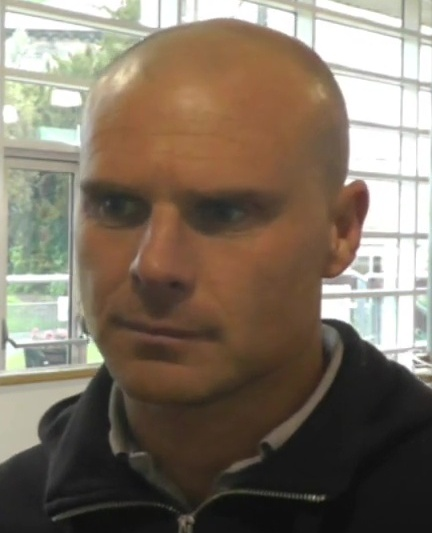

Personal information
- Full name: Gary Roy Jones
- Date of birth: 3 June 1977 (age 49)
- Place of birth: Birkenhead, England
- Height: 5 ft 10 in (1.78 m)
- Position: Midfielder

Youth career
- Liverpool

Senior career*
Years	Team	Apps	(Gls)
1996–1997	Caernarfon Town	24	(1)
1997–1998	Swansea City	7	(0)
1998	→ Rochdale (loan)	4	(0)
1998–2001	Rochdale	136	(22)
2001–2004	Barnsley	56	(2)
2003	→ Rochdale (loan)	10	(2)
2004–2012	Rochdale	318	(50)
2012–2014	Bradford City	84	(8)
2014–2015	Notts County	43	(3)
2015–2017	Southport	55	(5)
2016–2017	→ Altrincham (loan)	15	(1)
2022–2023	Ashville		
Total		760	(93)

Managerial career
- 2023–2024: Ashville
- * Club domestic league appearances and goals

Gary Roy Jones (born 3 June 1977) is an English football coach and former player who was most recently the manager of Ashville.

He played as a central midfielder. He made 716 league appearances, including 464 for Rochdale, for whom he holds the all-time record for the most appearances.

== Playing career ==
=== Caernarfon Town ===
Born in Birkenhead, Merseyside, Jones started his career with Caernarfon Town in the 1996–97 season before moving to Swansea City.

=== Swansea City ===
He stayed at Swansea City for one season but during the second half of the season he was loaned to Rochdale.

=== Rochdale ===
While on loan Jones made his Rochdale debut on 17 January 1998, in a 3–1 defeat against Peterborough United. Jones signed a permanent deal with Rochdale after the end of the season. Jones spent three years in his first stint with the Lancashire club.

=== Barnsley ===
In 2001, Jones was transferred to Barnsley, joining up with former Rochdale manager Steve Parkin. Jones stayed at Barnsley for three seasons without making many appearances and in 2003 he went back on loan to his former club Rochdale.

=== Rochdale return ===
In 2004, he re-joined Rochdale on a permanent deal and went on to become the club captain. Jones holds the record for most appearances for Rochdale and is regarded by the fans as a true Rochdale A.F.C. legend due to his long tenure with the club, his commitment and determined style of play, and his leadership on the pitch. His qualities within the Rochdale squad during the 2009–10 season played a large part in helping the club to earn promotion into League One. Jones scored a brilliant long-range strike at St Mary's against managerless Southampton on 4 September 2010, which he described as "the best I've ever struck". Jones was Rochdale's top scorer in the 2010–11 season, Rochdale's first season in the third tier of English football for 36 years, and was praised by manager Keith Hill for his outstanding contributions.

=== Bradford City ===
On 22 June 2012, it was announced that Jones would sign for Bradford City on a one-year contract. On 11 August 2012, he made his Bradford debut in the League Cup in a 1–0 win against Notts County. He made his league debut a week later against Gillingham. He made his home debut on 21 August in a 1–0 win against Fleetwood Town, providing the assist for the only goal of the game, taking the corner that James Hanson scored from. On 25 August, he was named man of the match in a 5–1 win against AFC Wimbledon. He scored his first goal for the club on 18 September 2012, scoring a free-kick in a 3–1 win against Morecambe, and in the process helped Bradford to their best start to a season at home since 1957. He scored his second goal for the club in a 1–0 win against Plymouth Argyle on 20 November. On 11 December 2012, Jones captained Bradford in a historic win over Premier League side Arsenal in the League Cup. He then led the team to a 4–3 victory over two legs against Aston Villa in the semi-finals. It was only the second time the team have played at Wembley, the last time being in 1996 when Bradford won the Second Division play-off final. Bradford were the first team from the fourth-tier of English football to reach a major Wembley cup final and only the second team from the fourth-tier to reach a major final, the only other team to achieve this feat is Jones' former club Rochdale who reached the League Cup final in 1962. Bradford lost the final to Jones' former club Swansea City. Jones was voted player of the year for the 2012–13 season. On 9 May 2014 it was announced that Jones would not be offered a new contract at the club and would leave at the end of the 13/14 season.

=== Notts County ===
He moved to Notts County on 7 August 2014, signing a one-year contract. Jones made his County debut only two days later on 9 August 2014, in a 1–1 draw against Preston North End. He made his home debut on 16 August in a 0–1 defeat against Fleetwood Town. He scored his first goal for the club on 23 August 2015 in a 0–2 win against Port Vale. He scored his second goal for the club in a 5–3 win against Crawley Town on 18 October. He played 42 times for County in the league that season, scoring three goals as they finished twenty-first behind Crewe Alexandra by two points, and were relegated to League Two.

=== Southport ===
On 6 August 2015, Jones agreed to join National League side Southport. After a successful first season with the club, he signed on to stay with the club for the 2016/17 season and was appointed club captain by manager Andy Bishop.

=== Altrincham ===
On 9 December 2016, Jones signed a month-long loan deal with Altrincham.

== Post retirement and coaching career ==
Following his retirement, he now works in care

In August 2022 he became a youth coach at former club Bradford City.

Following a spell playing with Ashville F.C., he became the club's manager in 2023. He would then go on to resign from Ashville later that year.

== Career statistics ==
Appearances and goals by club, season and competition
Club	Season	League			National Cup		League Cup		Other		Total	
Club	Season	Division	Apps	Goals	Apps	Goals	Apps	Goals	Apps	Goals	Apps	Goals
Swansea City	1997–98	Third Division	7	0	0	0	1	0	0	0	8	0
Rochdale (loan)	1997–98	Third Division	4	0	0	0	0	0	0	0	4	0
Rochdale	1997–98	Third Division	14	2	0	0	0	0	0	0	14	2
Rochdale	1998–99	Third Division	20	0	3	0	1	0	2	1	26	1
Rochdale	1999–2000	Third Division	39	6	3	0	0	0	5	0	47	6
Rochdale	2000–01	Third Division	44	8	1	0	2	0	1	1	48	9
Rochdale	2001–02	Third Division	20	5	2	0	2	0	1	1	25	6
Rochdale	Total		137	21	9	0	5	0	9	3	160	24
Barnsley	2001–02	First Division	25	1	0	0	0	0	0	0	25	1
Barnsley	2002–03	Second Division	31	1	0	0	1	0	0	0	32	1
Barnsley	2003–04	Second Division	0	0	0	0	0	0	0	0	0	0
Barnsley	Total		56	2	0	0	1	0	0	0	57	2
Rochdale (loan)	2003–04	Third Division	10	2	1	0	0	0	0	0	11	2
Rochdale	2003–04	Third Division	16	2	0	0	0	0	0	0	16	2
Rochdale	2004–05	League Two	39	8	3	0	1	0	1	0	44	8
Rochdale	2005–06	League Two	42	4	1	0	1	0	2	0	46	4
Rochdale	2006–07	League Two	27	3	2	0	0	0	2	0	31	3
Rochdale	2007–08	League Two	46	7	1	0	2	0	1	0	50	7
Rochdale	2008–09	League Two	30	0	2	0	1	0	1	0	34	0
Rochdale	2009–10	League Two	34	4	2	0	1	0	0	0	37	4
Rochdale	2010–11	League One	46	17	1	0	2	2	0	0	49	19
Rochdale	2011–12	League One	45	5	1	0	3	1	1	0	50	6
Rochdale	Total		325	50	13	0	11	3	8	0	357	53
Bradford City	2012–13	League Two	39	2	3	0	8	0	4	0	54	2
Bradford City	2013–14	League One	45	6	1	0	0	0	0	0	46	6
Bradford City	Total		84	8	4	0	8	0	4	0	100	8
Notts County	2014–15	League One	43	3	1	0	1	0	2	0	47	3
Southport	2015–16	National League	43	5	1	0	0	0	3	0	47	5
Southport	2016–17	National League	12	0	1	0	0	0	0	0	13	0
Southport	Total		55	5	2	0	0	0	3	0	60	5
Altrincham (loan)	2016–17	National League North	15	1	0	0	0	0	0	0	15	1
Ashville	2022–23	NWCFL Division One South	0	0	0	0	0	0	0	0	0	0
Ashville	2023–24	NWCFL Division One South	0	0	0	0	0	0	1	0	1	0
Ashville	Total		0	0	0	0	0	0	1	0	1	0
Career total			736	92	30	0	27	3	27	3	820	98

== Honours ==
Bradford City

- Football League Two play-offs: 2013
- Football League Cup runner-up: 2012–13

Individual

- PFA Team of the Year: 2009–10 League Two, 2012–13 League Two
