= Gareth Griffiths (footballer) =

English footballer (born 1970)

Personal information
- Full name: Gareth John Griffiths
- Date of birth: 10 April 1970 (age 56)
- Place of birth: Winsford, England
- Height: 6 ft 4 in (1.93 m)
- Position: Defender

Youth career
- 1981–1984: Crewe Alexandra

Senior career*
Years	Team	Apps	(Gls)
1991–1993	Rhyl		
1993–1998	Port Vale	94	(4)
1997	→ Shrewsbury Town (loan)	6	(0)
1998–2001	Wigan Athletic	53	(2)
2001–2006	Rochdale	184	(14)
2006–2007	Northwich Victoria	27	(1)
Total		364	(21)
- * Club domestic league appearances and goals

Gareth John Griffiths (born 10 April 1970) is an English former footballer. A defender, he played 337 league games in a 13-year career in the English Football League.

Starting his career with Welsh club Rhyl, he made the move to the English professional game in 1993 with Port Vale. After around 100 games in five years for the club, he transferred to Wigan Athletic in 1998. In another three years, he moved on to Rochdale. A constant first-team player at 'Dale, he made 184 league appearances in five years with the club. In 2006, he joined non-League Northwich Victoria, where he spent one season before retiring.

== Career ==
=== Early career ===
Griffiths spent three and a half years with Crewe Alexandra until he left at 14. He joined Rhyl at the age of 21 and played in the League of Wales. He worked as a structural craftsman after serving an apprenticeship with steelwork.

=== Port Vale ===
Griffiths played three trial games for Second Division club Port Vale and was purchased for a fee of £1,000 in February 1993. Manager John Rudge had previously found great success in signing Andy Jones from Rhyl. Griffiths turned down an approach from Vale's Potteries derby rivals Stoke City to sign for Vale, after manager Lou Macari rang him two games into his trial. Griffiths made his debut in a 1–1 draw with Stockport County at Vale Park on 12 February 1994. He scored his first two goals for the club in a 2–1 win over Rotherham United on 12 April. He played little part in the 1993–94 promotion campaign, though found himself regularly appearing in the First Division from August 1994. In November 1994, he developed a groin injury, which required him to go in for a double hernia operation in January 1995, but by the end of the season had regained his first-team place. A regular member of the "Valiants" first-team in 1995–96, he played in the 1996 Anglo-Italian Cup final, as Vale lost 5–2 to Genoa. He made 31 appearances in 1996–97, as the club made its joint-second-highest ever league finish. He spent November 1997 on loan at Shrewsbury Town. He made six Third Division appearances for Jake King's "Shrews", before returning to Vale. He played three games for Vale in 1997–98. He was given a free transfer in the summer after the club were only willing to offer him a 12-month deal. He was offered a three-year contract elsewhere.

=== Wigan Athletic ===
He signed a three-year deal with Wigan Athletic in June 1998. He was signed by John Deehan, who was replaced by Ray Mathias after only three days during a period of management flux from chairman Dave Whelan. He was appointed club captain by new manager Bruce Rioch. He played 26 times for the "Latics" in 1998–99, though did not feature in the play-off semi-final defeat to Manchester City. The club switched stadiums in the summer, moving from Springfield Park to the JJB Stadium. Griffiths played 20 times in 1999–2000, and was an unused substitute in the play-off final defeat to Gillingham. He made 22 appearances in 2000–01 for manager Bruce Rioch, but did not feature under Steve Bruce.

=== Rochdale ===
He joined Rochdale in July 2001. Scoring four goals in 48 appearances in 2001–02, he helped "Dale" reach the Third Division play-off semi-finals, where they were beaten by Rushden & Diamonds. Manager Steve Parkin left Spotland in November 2001, and the club tried John Hollins, Paul Simpson and Alan Buckley in the role before Parkin returned in December 2003. In his absence, Griffiths scored seven goals in 47 games in 2002–03, helping the club to avoid finishing at the foot of the table. He then made 35 appearances in 2003–04, as Rochdale avoided slipping out of the league by two places and five points. The defender scored four goals in 43 games in 2004–05, including a surprise hat-trick against Scarborough in a 4–1 win in the Football League Trophy on 28 September. He played 29 games in League Two in 2005–06, before announcing his retirement from professional football in May 2006. He then moved out of the Football League and joined Steve Burr's Northwich Victoria in July 2006, and played 27 Conference National games before leaving at the end of the 2006–07 season.

== Post-retirement ==
For the last four years of his playing career, he served on the Management Committee of the Professional Footballers' Association, reporting directly to chief executive Gordon Taylor and other senior members of the management board. Whilst playing, he obtained a first-class honours degree and a post-graduate marketing certificate and qualified as a financial consultant. Following his retirement from football, he began working in the financial services industry. He became a trustee at the PFA and co-founded Pro Sport Wealth Management LLP, a Chartered firm of Independent Financial Advisers who specialise in bespoke planning for both individual and corporate sports professionals.

== Career statistics ==
Appearances and goals by club, season and competition
Club	Season	League			FA Cup		Other		Total	
Club	Season	Division	Apps	Goals	Apps	Goals	Apps	Goals	Apps	Goals
Port Vale	1993–94	Second Division	4	2	0	0	0	0	4	2
Port Vale	1994–95	First Division	20	0	2	1	3	0	25	1
Port Vale	1995–96	First Division	41	2	4	0	8	0	53	2
Port Vale	1996–97	First Division	26	0	1	0	4	0	31	0
Port Vale	1997–98	First Division	3	0	0	0	0	0	3	0
Port Vale	Total		94	4	7	1	15	0	116	5
Shrewsbury Town (loan)	1997–98	Third Division	6	0	0	0	0	0	6	0
Wigan Athletic	1998–99	Second Division	20	0	1	0	5	1	26	1
Wigan Athletic	1999–2000	Second Division	16	1	1	0	3	0	20	1
Wigan Athletic	2000–01	Second Division	17	1	3	0	2	0	22	1
Wigan Athletic	Total		53	2	5	0	10	1	68	3
Rochdale	2001–02	Third Division	41	4	2	0	5	0	48	4
Rochdale	2002–03	Third Division	42	6	3	1	2	0	47	7
Rochdale	2003–04	Third Division	33	1	1	0	1	0	35	1
Rochdale	2004–05	League Two	39	1	2	0	2	3	43	4
Rochdale	2005–06	League Two	29	2	0	0	2	0	31	2
Rochdale	Total		184	14	8	1	12	3	204	18
Northwich Victoria	2006–07	Conference National	27	1	1	0	3	1	31	2
Career total			364	21	21	2	40	5	425	28

== Honours ==
Port Vale

- Football League Second Division second-place promotion: 1993–94
- Anglo-Italian Cup runner-up: 1996
