= Matt Gilks =

Footballer (born 1982)

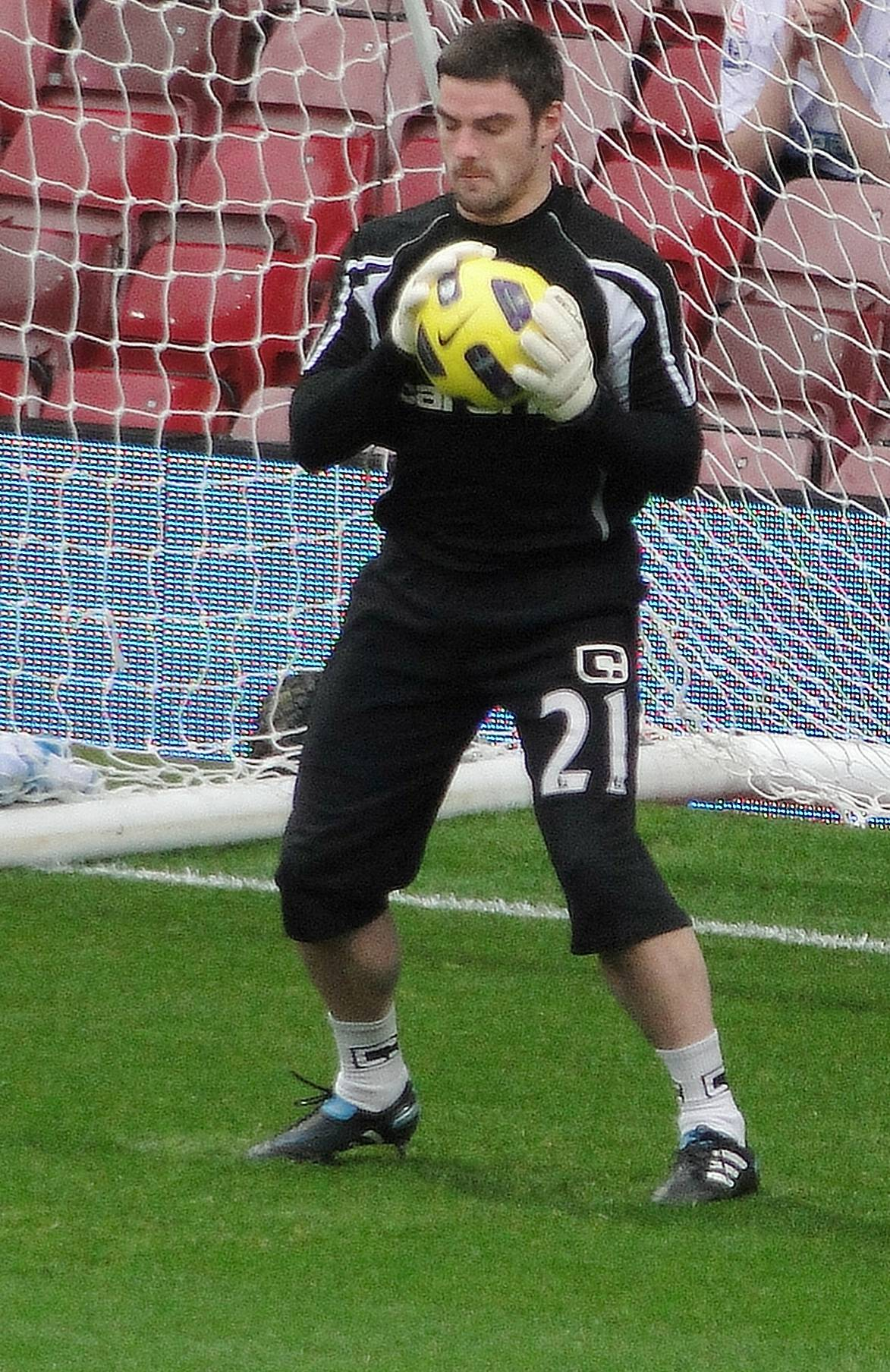
- Gilks in 2010

Personal information
- Full name: Matthew Gilks
- Date of birth: 4 June 1982 (age 44)
- Place of birth: Rochdale, England
- Height: 1.85 m (6 ft 1 in)
- Position: Goalkeeper

Team information
- Current team: Wigan Athletic (goalkeeping coach)

Youth career
- 1995–2000: Rochdale

Senior career*
| Years | Team | Apps | (Gls) |
| 2000–2007 | Rochdale | 176 | (0) |
| 2007–2008 | Norwich City | 0 | (0) |
| 2008–2014 | Blackpool | 182 | (0) |
| 2008 | → Shrewsbury Town (loan) | 4 | (0) |
| 2014–2016 | Burnley | 0 | (0) |
| 2016–2017 | Rangers | 0 | (0) |
| 2017 | Wigan Athletic | 14 | (0) |
| 2017–2019 | Scunthorpe United | 42 | (0) |
| 2019 | Lincoln City | 12 | (0) |
| 2019–2020 | Fleetwood Town | 5 | (0) |
| 2020–2022 | Bolton Wanderers | 36 | (0) |
| Total | | 471 | (0) |

International career
| 2012–2013 | Scotland | 3 | (0) |
- * Club domestic league appearances and goals

Matthew Gilks (born 4 June 1982) is a former professional footballer who played as a goalkeeper. He is currently goalkeeping coach at Wigan Athletic.

He played for Blackpool, Burnley, Norwich City, Rochdale, Rangers, Wigan Athletic, Shrewsbury Town, Scunthorpe United, Lincoln City, Fleetwood Town, and Bolton Wanderers.

Born in England, he qualified to represent Scotland. He was first selected for the Scotland national team in August 2010 and made his international debut in August 2012.

== Club career ==
=== Rochdale ===
Born in Rochdale, Greater Manchester, where he started out with Heyside Juniors, Gilks joined Rochdale at the age of 13. He was promoted from their youth team in 2001. After being coached by Fred Barber, he eventually replaced Neil Edwards in the first team, becoming a regular starter. He made a total of 198 appearances for the club in league and cup competitions, and by the time he was 24, he was the longest-serving player at Rochdale. Being an Oldham Athletic fan growing up, and living about a mile from Boundary Park, he states Andy Rhodes and Jon Hallworth as his heroes.

=== Norwich City ===
On 1 July 2007, Gilks signed a two-year contract with Championship club Norwich City, moving on a free transfer due to his contract with Rochdale having expired. He was unable to break into Norwich's first team, spending most of the 2007–08 season sitting on the substitutes bench. He also had a spell out of action with ligament damage after twisting his ankle in training in November 2007.

=== Blackpool ===
In the summer of 2008, and without having made a first-team appearance for Norwich, Gilks signed for fellow Championship club Blackpool as makeweight in a part-exchange deal which saw Wes Hoolahan go in the opposite direction. He made his debut on 12 August 2008 in a 2–0 League Cup defeat by Macclesfield Town.

After failing to break into the first team, and considering quitting the game due to lack of opportunities and a self-perceived lack of ability during a training session, he signed for League Two club Shrewsbury Town on a month's loan on 21 November to cover an injury crisis at the club. He made his debut the following day in a goalless draw with Lincoln City at Sincil Bank. He made three further appearances for Shrewsbury, with his final match coming on 13 December, a 1–0 defeat by Grimsby Town at Blundell Park, before returning to Blackpool.

While Simon Grayson was Blackpool manager, he did not usually name a substitute goalkeeper, preferring to have five outfield players on the bench. After Grayson left the club, in late December 2008, caretaker manager Tony Parkes immediately began naming Gilks as a substitute. After a number of matches as an unused substitute, Gilks made his league debut for Blackpool on 31 January 2009, after Paul Rachubka was sent off three minutes into Blackpool's match against Crystal Palace at Selhurst Park. Gilks was brought on and helped Blackpool to a 1–0 win.

His first league start of the 2009–10 season came in the 2–0 win over Plymouth Argyle at Bloomfield Road on 17 October. After three consecutive clean sheets, Gilks was named in The Championship "Team of the Week", along with teammates Stephen Crainey and Marcel Seip, following his performance in Blackpool's goalless draw with Swansea City on 24 October at the Liberty Stadium. His 200th career Football League appearance came in a 1–0 home win over Ipswich Town on 6 March 2010, when he was also named Man of the Match. In addition, he was again named in The Championship "Team of the Week", following his performance, which saw a fourth clean sheet in five games.

On 13 November 2010, in a goalless draw at West Ham United, Gilks suffered an injury to his knee cap which kept him out much of the remainder of the 2010–11 campaign. After working with former Manchester United strength and conditioning coach Mick Clegg, he returned to the first team on 16 April 2011, in a home defeat by Wigan Athletic. Despite Blackpool's relegation from the Premier League in 2011, Gilks signed a new two-year contract with the club in July. His contract with Blackpool expired at the end of the 2013–14 season. He left the club to sign for Burnley, despite being offered a new contract with Blackpool.

=== Burnley ===
Gilks signed a two-year contract with newly promoted Premier League club Burnley in July 2014. He made his first appearance for Burnley in a League Cup tie; Gilks initially served as a backup to established first choice goalkeeper Tom Heaton.

=== Rangers ===
On 24 June 2016, Gilks signed for Rangers on a two-year deal. He made his debut for the club in a League Cup match against Annan Athletic on 19 July. He played in all five of Rangers' League Cup ties, keeping clean sheets in the first four. Rangers lost 1–0 to Celtic in the semi-final, but Gilks made several saves and was praised by the media and teammates for his performance.

=== Wigan Athletic ===
Gilks signed for Wigan Athletic on 31 January 2017. On his home debut against Preston North End he saved a Jordan Hugill penalty and the resultant rebound to help his side gain a 0–0 draw.

=== Scunthorpe United ===
Gilks signed for Scunthorpe United on 16 June 2017 on a free transfer, becoming the club's first-choice goalkeeper for the 2018–19 season.

=== Lincoln City ===
On 31 January 2019, Gilks signed for Lincoln City on a free transfer, and would go on to make twelve league appearances as Lincoln City won League Two.

=== Fleetwood Town ===
On 1 August 2019 Gilks signed for Fleetwood Town.

=== Bolton Wanderers ===
On 6 August 2020, Gilks signed for Bolton Wanderers, as a player-goalkeeping coach. His debut came on 13 November in which he was named Man of the Match in a 2–0 win against local rivals Salford City. He played a total of 35 matches as Bolton won promotion to League One and finished second in Bolton's Player of the Season award voting.

On 8 June 2021, Gilks signed a new one-year contract. He kept his spot as first-choice goalkeeper for the first match of the 21–22 season; however, after a 3–3 draw against MK Dons, in which he was at fault for two of MK Dons's goals, he lost his place to new signing Joel Dixon. On 10 January 2022, Gilks retired as a player to focus on being a full-time goalkeeping coach.

== International career ==
On 22 August 2010, the Scottish FA confirmed that manager Craig Levein was considering Gilks for a call-up to the Scotland national squad for their upcoming UEFA Euro 2012 qualifiers against Lithuania and Liechtenstein. Gilks qualifies to play for Scotland through his Scottish grandmother. Levein said of Gilks: "He is one we became aware of a while ago and have kept track of his progress. Obviously he was a key figure in Blackpool's promotion to the Barclays Premier League and while I will not name my squad until tomorrow, he is one I think we need to take a closer look at. He comes highly recommended, is playing regularly for his club and the next logical step is for our goalkeeping coach to work closely with him."

Two days later he was selected in the Scotland squad, joining fellow Blackpool player Charlie Adam. On his call up Gilks said: "My grandmother was Scottish and they've traced the roots back and checked it. I'm eligible and it's great to be in the squad. Everybody knows that I am English but England doesn't come knocking on the door of Blackpool Football Club and I think that's a problem. They look at the bigger clubs. To be honest it was nice of Scotland to come and have a look at me and find out about me."

In November 2010, Gilks had to withdraw from the Scotland squad through injury. He again withdrew on 10 August 2011, hours before kick-off in a friendly against Denmark, with an ankle injury. On 15 August 2012, he made his debut for Scotland as a first-half substitute in a friendly against Australia.

== Coaching career ==
On 6 August 2020, Gilks signed for Bolton Wanderers as a player-goalkeeping coach. On 22 January 2025, manager Ian Evatt left by mutual consent — with Gilks leaving his role as well.

In February 2025, Gilks joined Barnsley as goalkeeping coach. He departed the club at the end of the 2024–25 season. He joined Accrington Stanley ahead of the 2025–26 season.

In October 2026, Gilks returned to former club Wigan Athletic as goalkeeping coach.

== Career statistics ==
=== Club ===
As of match played 5 October 2021

Appearances and goals by club, season and competition
| Club | Season | League | | | National Cup | | League Cup | | Other | | Total | |
| Club | Season | Division | Apps | Goals | Apps | Goals | Apps | Goals | Apps | Goals | Apps | Goals |
|---|---|---|---|---|---|---|---|---|---|---|---|---|
| Rochdale | 1999–2000 | Third Division | 0 | 0 | 0 | 0 | 0 | 0 | 0 | 0 | 0 | 0 |
| Rochdale | 2000–01 | Third Division | 3 | 0 | 0 | 0 | 0 | 0 | 0 | 0 | 3 | 0 |
| Rochdale | 2001–02 | Third Division | 19 | 0 | 2 | 0 | 1 | 0 | 0 | 0 | 22 | 0 |
| Rochdale | 2002–03 | Third Division | 20 | 0 | 1 | 0 | 0 | 0 | 1 (Note: Appearance(s) in Football League Trophy) | 0 | 22 | 0 |
| Rochdale | 2003–04 | Third Division | 12 | 0 | 1 | 0 | 1 | 0 | 0 | 0 | 14 | 0 |
| Rochdale | 2004–05 | League Two | 30 | 0 | 3 | 0 | 0 | 0 | 2 | 0 | 35 | 0 |
| Rochdale | 2005–06 | League Two | 46 | 0 | 1 | 0 | 1 | 0 | 2 | 0 | 50 | 0 |
| Rochdale | 2006–07 | League Two | 46 | 0 | 2 | 0 | 1 | 0 | 2 | 0 | 51 | 0 |
| Rochdale | Total | | 176 | 0 | 10 | 0 | 4 | 0 | 7 | 0 | 197 | 0 |
| Norwich City | 2007–08 | Championship | 0 | 0 | 0 | 0 | 0 | 0 | — | | 0 | 0 |
| Blackpool | 2008–09 | Championship | 5 | 0 | 0 | 0 | 1 | 0 | — | | 6 | 0 |
| Blackpool | 2009–10 | Championship | 26 | 0 | 0 | 0 | 3 | 0 | 3 (Note: Appearances in Championship play-offs) | 0 | 32 | 0 |
| Blackpool | 2010–11 | Premier League | 18 | 0 | 0 | 0 | 0 | 0 | — | | 18 | 0 |
| Blackpool | 2011–12 | Championship | 42 | 0 | 3 | 0 | 0 | 0 | 3 | 0 | 48 | 0 |
| Blackpool | 2012–13 | Championship | 45 | 0 | 2 | 0 | 1 | 0 | — | | 48 | 0 |
| Blackpool | 2013–14 | Championship | 46 | 0 | 1 | 0 | 1 | 0 | — | | 48 | 0 |
| Blackpool | Total | | 182 | 0 | 6 | 0 | 6 | 0 | 6 | 0 | 200 | 0 |
| Shrewsbury Town (loan) | 2008–09 | League Two | 4 | 0 | — | | — | | 0 | 0 | 4 | 0 |
| Burnley | 2014–15 | Premier League | 0 | 0 | 0 | 0 | 1 | 0 | — | | 1 | 0 |
| Burnley | 2015–16 | Championship | 0 | 0 | 0 | 0 | 1 | 0 | — | | 1 | 0 |
| Burnley | Total | | 0 | 0 | 0 | 0 | 2 | 0 | — | | 2 | 0 |
| Rangers | 2016–17 | Scottish Premiership | 0 | 0 | 0 | 0 | 5 | 0 | — | | 5 | 0 |
| Wigan Athletic | 2016–17 | Championship | 14 | 0 | 0 | 0 | 0 | 0 | 0 | 0 | 14 | 0 |
| Scunthorpe United | 2017–18 | League One | 42 | 0 | 3 | 0 | 2 | 0 | 1 | 0 | 48 | 0 |
| Scunthorpe United | 2018–19 | League One | 0 | 0 | 0 | 0 | 0 | 0 | 0 | 0 | 0 | 0 |
| Scunthorpe United | Total | | 42 | 0 | 3 | 0 | 2 | 0 | 1 | 0 | 48 | 0 |
| Lincoln City | 2018–19 | League Two | 12 | 0 | 0 | 0 | 0 | 0 | 0 | 0 | 12 | 0 |
| Fleetwood Town | 2019–20 | League One | 5 | 0 | 0 | 0 | 0 | 0 | 1 | 0 | 6 | 0 |
| Bolton Wanderers | 2020–21 | League Two | 35 | 0 | 0 | 0 | 0 | 0 | 0 | 0 | 35 | 0 |
| Bolton Wanderers | 2021–22 | League One | 1 | 0 | 0 | 0 | 1 | 0 | 2 | 0 | 4 | 0 |
| Bolton Wanderers | Total | | 36 | 0 | 0 | 0 | 1 | 0 | 2 | 0 | 39 | 0 |
| Career total | | | 471 | 0 | 19 | 0 | 20 | 0 | 17 | 0 | 527 | 0 |

=== International ===
As of match played 10 September 2013

Appearances and goals by national team and year
| National team | Year | Apps | Goals |
|---|---|---|---|
| Scotland | 2012 | 2 | 0 |
| Scotland | 2013 | 1 | 0 |
| Total | | 3 | 0 |

== Honours ==
Blackpool

- Football League Championship play-offs: 2010

Lincoln City

- EFL League Two: 2018–19

Bolton Wanderers

- EFL League Two third-place promotion: 2020–21

Individual

- Blackpool Player of the Year: 2013–14

== See also ==
- List of Scotland international footballers born outside Scotland
