= Jamie Clarke (footballer, born 1982) =

English footballer (born 1982)

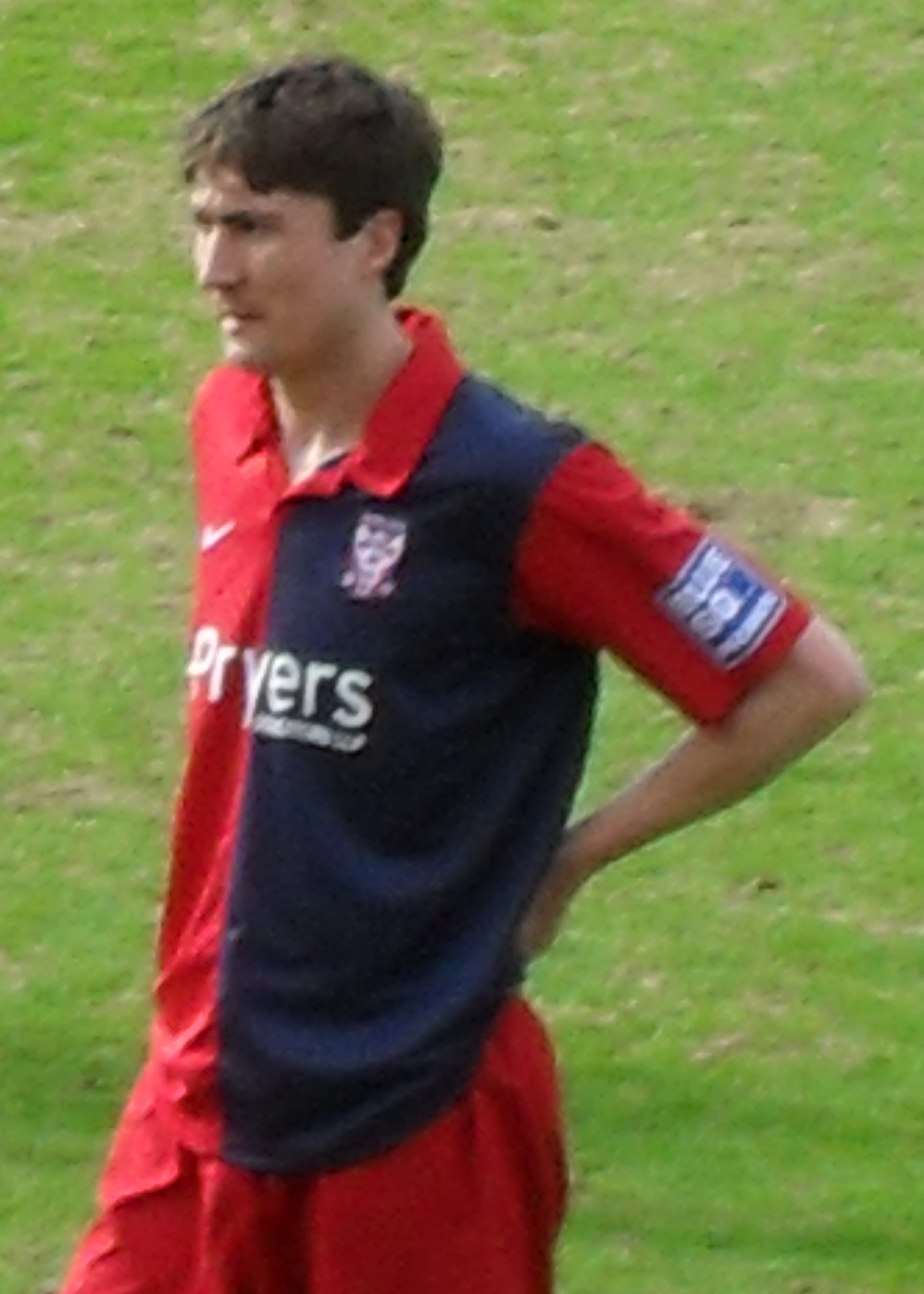
- Clarke playing for York City in 2010

Personal information
- Full name: James William Clarke
- Date of birth: 18 September 1982 (age 44)
- Place of birth: Sunderland, England
- Height: 6 ft 2 in (1.88 m)
- Positions: Defender; midfielder

Youth career
- ?–2002: Mansfield Town

Senior career*
Years	Team	Apps	(Gls)
2002–2004	Mansfield Town	33	(1)
2004–2006	Rochdale	63	(1)
2006–2007	Boston United	51	(3)
2007–2010	Grimsby Town	74	(3)
2010	York City	7	(0)
2010–2011	Gainsborough Trinity	17	(0)
2011–2012	Guiseley	52	(1)
2015	Broughty Athletic		
2015–2016	Arbroath	14	(0)
2016	Montrose	13	(1)
Total		324	(10)
- * Club domestic league appearances and goals as of 01:20, 18 July 2016 (UTC)

James William Clarke (born 18 September 1982) is an English former professional footballer who played as a midfielder or defender.

He began his career with Mansfield Town in 2002, and went on to join Rochdale in 2004 and Boston United in 2006. After a year with The Pilgrims he was signed by Grimsby Town where he remained for three seasons before being released in 2010. He briefly joined York City before moving on to Gainsborough Trinity. He signed with Guiseley in August 2011 and played for the club until December 2012 when he emigrated to Thailand to become a football coach at an academy. He then played in Scotland for Broughty Athletic, Arbroath and Montrose.

== Career ==
=== Mansfield Town ===
Born in Sunderland, Tyne and Wear, Clarke was brought up into the first team at Mansfield Town in the 2001–02 season, after being promoted from the club's youth system. He made his debut on 1 April 2002, in a 5–3 defeat against Luton Town, and scored his first goal against Blackpool in April 2003. Clarke remained with Mansfield until the end of the 2003–04 campaign, where he then was released.

=== Rochdale ===
Upon his release from Mansfield, Clarke signed a two-year contract for League Two side Rochdale. He remained with the club throughout the 2004–05 and 2005–06 seasons, and went on to make over 60 appearances in all competitions for the club, scoring once against Lincoln City.

=== Boston United ===
His next port of call was to join Boston United in January 2006. Here, Clarke was a first team regular, in a season where the club eventually went on to lose their Football League status, and were relegated on the final day of the season, losing to Wrexham. Clarke left Boston a few weeks after the end of the 2006–07 season.

=== Grimsby Town ===
Only a few weeks after the end of the 2006–07 season, Clarke was the first new face in at Grimsby Town for the 2007–08 campaign. Manager Alan Buckley brought him in as the club's new right back, to cater for the vacant spot left by retiring and long serving legend John McDermott. Despite this, Clarke was also deployed in midfield during his first season. He managed to make an appearance at Wembley Stadium for the club, as they lost 2–0 to Milton Keynes Dons in the Final of the Football League Trophy. In the 2008–09 season, Buckley signed Robbie Stockdale as the club's first choice right back, giving Clarke an uphill struggle to claim a place in the team. His adopted midfield role was his main role throughout the season. However, when Buckley was sacked, his replacement Mike Newell opted to bring in fresh faces in both defence and midfield, making several players come ahead of Clarke in the pecking order. Clarke eventually would only be called upon in the event of illness or injury. At the end of the season, Newell commented on BBC Radio Humberside that Clarke as well as fellow utility player Danny Boshell may still be offered a fresh deal, and Clarke put pen to paper to sign a fresh one-year deal a week later. On 13 January 2010, new manager Neil Woods told Clarke, along with Danny Boshell, Matthew Heywood and Barry Conlon that they were free to leave the club in the January transfer window. Clarke was released by the club on 2 February 2010, along with Boshell and Heywood.

=== York City ===
A few hours after his release from Grimsby, Clarke signed for Conference Premier team York City on a contract until the end of the 2009–10 season. He made his debut in a 2–1 defeat to Barrow in the FA Trophy quarter-final on 2 March 2010. This was followed by his league debut in a 2–1 defeat to Salisbury City. He finished the season with eight appearances for York and was released by the club on 18 May 2010.

=== Gainsborough Trinity and Guiseley ===
Clarke went on trial with newly relegated Conference Premier team Darlington in July 2010 and he played in a 3–0 pre-season friendly defeat to Carlisle United. He then had a trial with Gateshead in August. Following a trial with St Johnstone of the Scottish Premier League, Clarke eventually signed for Conference North team Gainsborough Trinity in August 2010. Clarke was released in May 2011.

On 6 July 2011 he signed for fellow Conference North side Guiseley, going on to make 55 appearances including defeat in the 2011–12 Conference North play-off semi finals.

=== Career break ===
In December 2012 he announced his departure from the club by revealing he had accepted a job to become a coach at a football academy in Chang Mai in Thailand.

=== Return to Football ===
After a short spell with Scottish Junior club Broughty Athletic, Clarke signed for Scottish League Two club Arbroath in July 2015. After being released by Arbroath, Clarke joined Montrose in January 2016. In July 2016, Montrose announced that he had left the club due to work commitments.

== Coaching career ==
Clarke previously spent time coaching at the Traidhos Football Academy in Chiang Mai, Thailand. After his short stint in Scotland with both Montrose and Arbroath Clarke accepted a position to become a football coach once again for a football development project linking Thai footballers to English football teams, in Bangkok, Thailand.

Clarke joined Traill International School as head coach until March 2021 before leaving to join Thai Amateur team FCBangSaoTong (Formerly known as QonQuest FC) as head coach where he has been tasked to help the team qualify for the Thai League 3 competition.

== Career statistics ==
Appearances and goals by club, season and competition
Club	Season	League			FA Cup		League Cup		Other		Total	
Club	Season	Division	Apps	Goals	Apps	Goals	Apps	Goals	Apps	Goals	Apps	Goals
Mansfield Town	2001–02	Third Division	1	0	0	0	0	0	0	0	1	0
Mansfield Town	2002–03	Second Division	20	1	2	0	1	0	1 (Note: Appearance(s) in Football League Trophy)	0	24	1
Mansfield Town	2003–04	Third Division	12	0	2	0	1	0	1	0	16	0
Mansfield Town	Total		33	1	4	0	2	0	2	0	41	1
Rochdale	2004–05	League Two	41	1	3	0	1	0	2	0	47	1
Rochdale	2005–06	League Two	22	0	1	0	1	0	2	0	26	0
Rochdale	Total		63	1	4	0	2	0	4	0	73	1
Boston United	2005–06	League Two	15	1	0	0	0	0	0	0	15	1
Boston United	2006–07	League Two	36	2	1	0	1	0	0	0	38	1
Boston United	Total		51	3	1	0	1	0	0	0	53	3
Grimsby Town	2007–08	League Two	29	2	2	0	0	0	7	1	38	3
Grimsby Town	2008–09	League Two	32	1	0	0	2	0	2	0	36	1
Grimsby Town	2009–10	League Two	13	0	0	0	0	0	2	0	15	0
Grimsby Town	Total		74	3	2	0	2	0	11	1	89	4
York City	2009–10	Conference Premier	7	0	0	0	—		1 (Note: Appearance(s) in FA Trophy)	0	8	0
Gainsborough Trinity	2010–11	Conference North	17	0	1	0	—		0	0	18	0
Guiseley	2011–12	Conference North	39	1	2	0	—		6 (Note: Four appearances in FA Trophy, two in Conference North play-offs)	0	47	1
Guiseley	2012–13	Conference North	13	0	0	0	—		2	0	15	0
Guiseley	Total		52	1	2	0	0	0	8	0	62	1
Arbroath	2015–16	Scottish League Two	14	0	2	0	1	0	1 (Note: Appearance(s) in Scottish Challenge Cup)	0	18	0
Montrose	2015–16	Scottish League Two	13	1	0	0	0	0	0	0	13	1
Career total			324	10	16	0	8	0	27	1	375	11
