= Rickie Lambert =

English footballer (born 1982)

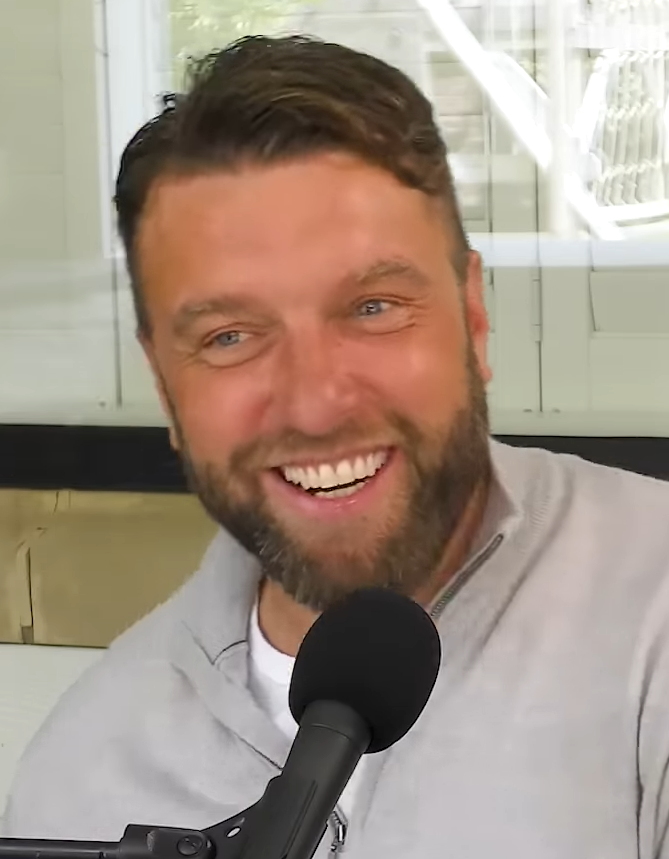
- Lambert in 2023

Personal information
- Full name: Rickie Lee Lambert
- Date of birth: 16 February 1982 (age 44)
- Place of birth: Kirkby, England
- Height: 6 ft 2 in (1.87 m)
- Position: Striker

Team information
- Current team: Wigan Athletic (youth development coach)

Youth career
- 1992–1997: Liverpool

Senior career*
Years	Team	Apps	(Gls)
1998–2000	Blackpool	3	(0)
2001–2002	Macclesfield Town	44	(8)
2002–2005	Stockport County	98	(18)
2005–2006	Rochdale	64	(28)
2006–2009	Bristol Rovers	128	(51)
2009–2014	Southampton	207	(106)
2014–2015	Liverpool	25	(2)
2015–2016	West Bromwich Albion	20	(1)
2016–2017	Cardiff City	18	(4)
Total		607	(218)

International career
2013–2014	England	11	(3)
- * Club domestic league appearances and goals

Rickie Lee Lambert (born 16 February 1982) is an English former professional footballer who is currently an Academy Youth Development Coach at Wigan Athletic. A striker, Lambert was known for his large stature and physical performances, drawing comparisons with former Southampton player Matt Le Tissier for his ability in front of goal and penalty record.

He began his career at Blackpool, having been previously dropped by Liverpool as a youngster, and played in the Football League with Macclesfield Town, Stockport County, Rochdale, Bristol Rovers before joining Southampton for over £1 million in 2009. Lambert proved a key signing for Southampton, becoming their top scorer as they were promoted to the Championship from League One in 2011 and to the Premier League the following season, scoring 117 goals for the team across all competitions. After a season back at Liverpool, he had a season each at West Bromwich Albion and Cardiff City. Lambert announced his retirement in October 2017 after being unable to find a new club following his departure from Cardiff City. He won a number of personal awards during his career, including two league Golden Boots.

On 8 August 2013, Lambert was called up to the England team for the first time, scoring on his England debut at Wembley Stadium in a friendly against Scotland with his first touch. On 12 May 2014, he was named in the England squad for the 2014 FIFA World Cup.

== Club career ==
=== Early career ===
Lambert was born and brought up in the Westvale area of Kirkby, Merseyside by parents Maureen and Ray. Lambert joined local club Liverpool as a youngster aged 10, but was released when he was 15.

=== Blackpool ===
Lambert tried out for non-League club Marine, before becoming a trainee with Blackpool in August 1998 at the age of 16. He made his professional debut on 7 August 1999 as a 17-year-old, coming on as a 68th-minute substitute for Andy Couzens in a 2–1 Second Division win against Wrexham at Bloomfield Road. He made two more substitute appearances in the 1999–2000 season, which ended with Blackpool being relegated. The following season Lambert was on a month-to-month contract and struggling to get a place in the reserves. Having been on a month-to-month contract, he was released by Steve McMahon in November 2000.

=== Macclesfield Town ===
Lambert remained a free agent for almost four months, during which time he worked in a beetroot bottling plant to make ends meet, until he was signed by another Third Division club, Macclesfield Town in March 2001, where he made a total of 9 league appearances in the remainder of the 2000–01 season. In the 2001–02 season, Lambert became a regular for Macclesfield, with a total of 40 appearances and 10 goals, his first two finishes coming in a 2–2 draw with Forest Green Rovers in the FA Cup first round on 17 November 2001, starting with a penalty. A week later, Lambert scored his first hat-trick in a 4–1 league win against Luton Town at Moss Rose.

=== Stockport County ===
Macclesfield received a club record transfer fee of £300,000 for Lambert from Second Division club Stockport County, in a move which was completed on 26 April 2002. In his first season in the third-tier, Lambert made a total of 32 appearances in all competitions, although only scored two goals (both in league matches) – in a 2–5 loss against Swindon Town on 18 January 2003, and in a 2–2 draw with former club Blackpool on 22 March 2003. The 2003–04 season would prove to be Lambert's most successful (on a personal level) yet, as 40 league appearances yielded 12 goals in a relegation-threatened season, including another against Blackpool and two in a late win against Rushden & Diamonds in the late stages of the season. Lambert was a regular for Stockport at the beginning of the newly restructured 2004–05 season, but following poor team performances and a very real threat of relegation for the club he left in February 2005.

=== Rochdale ===
Despite now being a relatively accomplished player, Lambert moved down a division to League Two club Rochdale from Stockport on 17 February 2005, the day after his 23rd birthday, for an undisclosed fee. Lambert scored his first goal for the club only nine days after his transfer, in a 1–1 draw with Kidderminster Harriers, but could not help secure promotion for the club. In the 2005–06 season, the striker featured in all 46 of Rochdale's league matches, scoring a total of 22 goals in the campaign, including one in a 3–1 defeat of former club Macclesfield Town.

=== Bristol Rovers ===
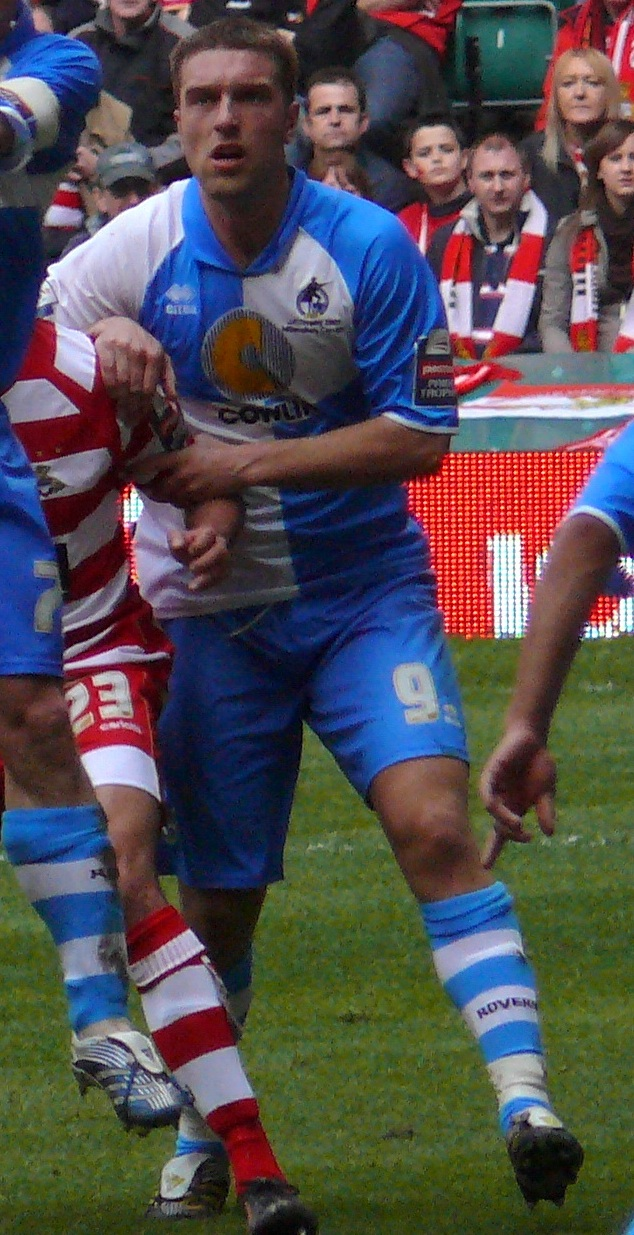
Lambert playing for Bristol Rovers against Doncaster Rovers in the 2007 Football League Trophy Final

Early into the 2006–07 season, Lambert was purchased for £200,000 from Rochdale by Bristol Rovers in a move finalised on 31 August 2006, transfer deadline day. Despite quickly establishing himself as a regular member of the squad, it took Lambert until November to score his first goal for the club, in the last minute of a 2–0 win over Barnet. The remainder of the season proved to be a disappointment for the forward, although an 86th-minute goal in the last league match of the season against Hartlepool United ultimately sent Bristol Rovers into the League Two play-offs, from which they won promotion to League One. Lambert also scored the only goal in the Football League Trophy Southern Area Final in a Bristol derby against local rivals Bristol City, which ultimately sent the team into the final with Doncaster Rovers (which they lost 2–3 after extra time).

In 2007–08, Lambert appeared in every match of the season for Bristol Rovers, scoring a total of 19 goals in all competitions Lambert proved to be most useful in the FA Cup, scoring goals in both legs of the First Round against Leyton Orient, two goals in the 5–1 Second Round win over Rushden & Diamonds, the only goal in the Fourth Round win against Barnet, and the only goal in the Fifth Round win against Southampton, scored in the last ten minutes of the match. Despite his relatively low scoring record, Lambert finished as the club's top scorer for the season.

In the following season, Lambert established himself as one of League One's best players by finishing as the season's joint-top scorer of 29 goals with Swindon Town's Simon Cox – a performance which also resulted in his first inclusion in the League One PFA Team of the Year. Throughout the season, in which Rovers finished a respectable 11th in the league, Lambert put in a number of impressive performances, including scoring all four goals in a 4–2 win against Southend United, and scoring a hat-trick in a 3–0 away win against Hereford United.

=== Southampton ===
==== 2009–10 ====
On 10 August 2009, with a total of 155 appearances and 59 goals for Bristol Rovers, Lambert completed a move worth in excess of £1 million to recently relegated League One club Southampton. The striker scored on his debut for the Saints against Northampton Town on 11 August 2009, and went on to become the club's top scorer for that season with 36 in all competitions. Other notable goals scored by Lambert during the season include one against local rivals Portsmouth in the FA Cup fifth round South Coast derby on 13 February 2010 a match his team lost 4–1 at home, a hat-trick against Milton Keynes Dons in the league on 20 March 2010, and a penalty against Carlisle United in the 4–1 Football League Trophy Final win at Wembley Stadium on 28 March 2010. Southampton finished the season in 7th, one place off the play-offs, despite a 10-point penalty for financial reasons. Following a season in which he performed statistically similarly to his last with Bristol Rovers, Lambert was again named in the PFA Team of the Year for League One, as well as winning the PFA Fans' Player of the Year award for the division.

He finished his debut season with Southampton with a total of 36 goals in all competitions, in addition to the goal he scored for Bristol Rovers in the opening match of the season. With 31 League goals, Lambert was the top scorer in English football's top four divisions for the second season in succession.

==== 2010–11 ====
In February 2011, Lambert scored two consecutive braces: the first was in a 2–1 away win at Exeter City, and the second was two penalties in a 4–4 away draw against Peterborough United. He scored his 50th goal for Southampton in a 1–0 victory over Carlisle United on 12 February. He finished the 2010–11 season as the club's top scorer with 21 goals, as they finished second in the league, and won promotion to the Championship. On 1 July 2011, Lambert signed a new contract to keep him at the club until 2014.

==== 2011–12 ====
He scored his first goal of the 2011–12 season with a 25-yard free kick in a 4–1 victory over Torquay United in the League Cup on 9 August. He followed this with a brace in a 5–2 victory at Ipswich Town. He scored a hat-trick against Nottingham Forest in a match which Southampton won 3–2. His 100th league appearance came in a 4–0 victory over Watford, with Lambert netting two penalties. He scored another hat-trick in a 3–0 victory over Brighton & Hove Albion, two of which came from the penalty spot. His 15th and 16th goals of the season came in a 2–2 draw at home to Blackpool, the opener and a late leveller. He scored in a 1–1 draw with south coast rivals Portsmouth. After sitting out for three matches after receiving a red card, he made his comeback with a goal in a 1–1 draw at Millwall in the FA Cup. His first league goal after his suspension was in the very next match and came from the penalty spot in a 1–1 draw against promotion hopefuls Cardiff City. His 20th goal of the season came in the FA Cup replay against Millwall. He scored his third hat-trick of the season in a 3–0 victory at Watford on 25 February. He continued his impressive first season in the second tier with a thunderous volley against Leeds United at Elland Road on 3 March, which took his tally for the 2011–12 season to 24 in all competitions.

On 13 March 2012, Lambert was named the Championship Player of the Year for 2011. He scored his fourth hat-trick of the season in a 3–2 victory at Millwall. While at Southampton, Lambert has not yet missed a penalty; giving him a 100% conversion rate. He scored both goals in a 2–0 victory at Crystal Palace to bring his goal tally to 30 for the season. He was then named in the 2011–12 PFA Team of the Year for the Championship, along with teammates Adam Lallana and Kelvin Davis. He finished the season with 31 goals, 27 in the league, as Saints clinched promotion to the Premier League, earning him the Southampton Fans' Player of the Season award for the second time in three years.

==== 2012–13 ====
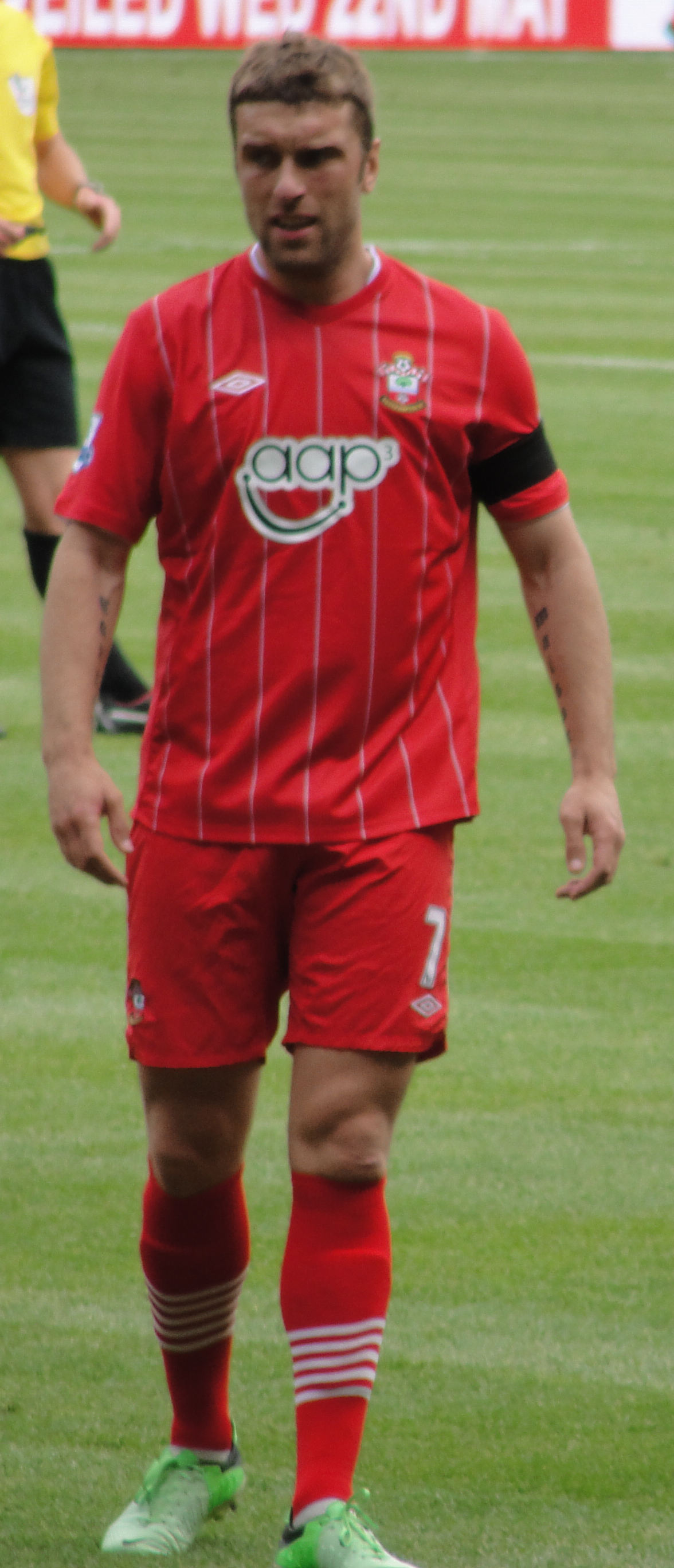
Lambert playing for Southampton in 2013

He scored on his very first Premier League appearance, scoring just minutes after replacing Jay Rodriguez as a substitute against Manchester City. This goal meant that Lambert joined a select group of players who have scored in all four league divisions. He followed this up with the opening goal in a match against Manchester United. He later grabbed two goals in Southampton's first league win of the season, a 4–1 victory over Aston Villa. His 10th Premier League goal came in a 2–2 draw at Chelsea, with Lambert getting the first goal as Southampton came back from 2–0 down. He had only been on the pitch for a matter of minutes. He scored his 100th Southampton goal in a defeat at Newcastle United, which was his 12th goal of the season. On 21 March 2013 Lambert signed a two-year contract extension, keeping him with the Saints until summer 2016. On his 500th career appearance nine days later, he scored a free-kick winner against Chelsea. He ended the season once again as the club's top goal scorer, scoring 15 league goals and featuring in all 38 league matches.

==== 2013–14 ====
Lambert started the 2013–14 Premier League season with another goal, a last-minute penalty in a 1–0 win over West Bromwich Albion at the Hawthorns on 17 August 2013. His second of the season, and 200th league goal of his career, came from a 25-yard (23 m) free kick in a 2–0 home victory against Crystal Palace on 28 September. He finished the season with 13 goals in 37 league matches.

=== Liverpool ===
On 2 June 2014, Lambert was confirmed as a Liverpool player after passing a medical, signing a two-year contract for an initial £4 million transfer fee plus add-ons. As he had been released from the club as a teenager, he said "I have always dreamt of playing for Liverpool, but I did kind of think the chance of playing for them had gone. I didn't think the chance would come".

He made his competitive debut for the club on 17 August in their first match of the new Premier League season, replacing Philippe Coutinho for the last 14 minutes of a 2–1 win over Southampton at Anfield. On 1 October, Lambert made his debut in European competitions for Liverpool in a 1–0 defeat against Swiss champions FC Basel in the UEFA Champions League group stages. His first goal for Liverpool came at Crystal Palace on 23 November, when he scored in the second minute following a through ball from Adam Lallana. Liverpool went on to lose the match 3–1. Four days later he scored his first goal in European competition, the first equaliser in a 2–2 draw away to Ludogorets Razgrad in the Champions League group stage. As a result, Lambert had scored in the top four divisions in England, the Champions League and for the national team. On 17 January 2015, Lambert scored his second Premier League goal for the club in a win over Aston Villa at Villa Park.

On 19 April 2015, Lambert was selected in the Football League team of the decade at the 2015 Football League Awards.

=== West Bromwich Albion ===
On 31 July 2015, Lambert joined West Bromwich Albion on a two-year contract for an undisclosed fee, reported to be in the region of £3 million. Later that same day, Lambert scored twice on his debut in a friendly against his former team Bristol Rovers. His competitive debut came on 10 August, starting as West Bromwich began the season with a 0–3 home defeat to Manchester City. He scored his first goal for the team on 31 October, netting a consolation from the penalty spot in a 3–2 home defeat by Leicester City.

=== Cardiff City ===
On 31 August 2016, Lambert signed for Championship club Cardiff City on a two-year contract for an undisclosed fee, making his debut in a 3–2 defeat to Norwich City on 10 September 2016. His first goal came as the equaliser against Rotherham United on 24 September, and he scored the winner six minutes later. In October 2016, Lambert suffered a "horrific" leg injury in a match against Nottingham Forest, leading to a long-term absence from the team. Continuing injuries and indifferent form led to Neil Warnock stating that the striker did not feature in his future plans. On 6 July 2017, Lambert left the club after his contract was cancelled by mutual consent.

Having not found a new club, Lambert retired from football on 2 October 2017.

== Penalty record ==
Lambert never took a penalty in normal play for his first two clubs, Blackpool and Macclesfield Town. However, on 28 November 2001, he missed in a penalty shoot-out for Macclesfield in an FA Cup first round replay away to Forest Green Rovers, but Macclesfield nonetheless won the shoot-out 11–10.

Lambert scored six from six attempts at Stockport County, and five from six attempts for Rochdale. The single miss for Rochdale was against his future club, Bristol Rovers in a 2–0 win on 29 April 2006. Lambert transferred to Rovers and continued to score well in penalties, achieving 13 goals from 14 attempts. His last miss occurred on 21 February 2009, against Leicester City in a 1–0 loss. At Southampton, he scored all 34 attempts. His first penalty for Liverpool in a friendly match against Milan was saved by goalkeeper Christian Abbiati. He scored Liverpool's first penalty in their UEFA Europa League round of 32 shoot-out against Beşiktaş, although they went on to lose 5–4.

== International career ==
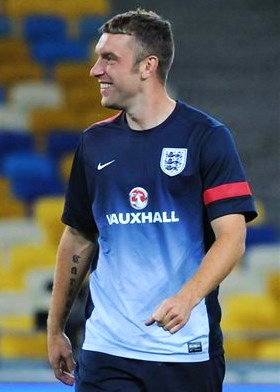
Lambert warming up for England in 2013

On 8 August 2013, Lambert was called up to the England squad for the first time at the age of 31, on the same day that his wife gave birth to their third child, a daughter, Bella. Six days later, he scored on his England debut with his first touch of the match against Scotland from a header, two minutes and 43 seconds after coming on as a substitute for Wayne Rooney to secure a 3–2 win for his country. Lambert earned a second call-up on 27 August 2013, when Roy Hodgson named him in the England squad to face Moldova and Ukraine in 2014 FIFA World Cup qualifiers. On 6 September 2013, Lambert was handed a start by Hodgson against Moldova at Wembley Stadium. He got his second international goal in this match, another header, making it two goals in two consecutive matches. Lambert also contributed the assists for two Danny Welbeck goals in the same match.

On 12 May 2014, Lambert was named in the 23-man England squad for the 2014 FIFA World Cup. In a preparation match for the tournament against Ecuador, on 4 June in Miami, he received the ball from Ross Barkley and scored to give England the lead in an eventual 2–2 draw. Lambert made his first appearance at the finals in England's second group match, a 2–1 defeat to Uruguay, replacing Jordan Henderson for the last three minutes as England sought an equaliser.

On 8 September 2014, in England's first UEFA Euro 2016 qualifying match against Switzerland, Lambert came on as a 90th-minute substitute and with his first touch assisted Danny Welbeck to seal the 2–0 win in Basel.

== Coaching career ==
In May 2023, Lambert joined Wigan Athletic as a Youth Development Coach with the club's academy.

== Personal life ==
Lambert is married to Amy and the couple have three children. Their third child, was born on 8 August 2013, the same day he was called up to the England squad for his debut against Scotland. Since 2020, Lambert has espoused a range of conspiracies on social media, including around COVID-19 and the concept of 15-minute cities.

== Career statistics ==
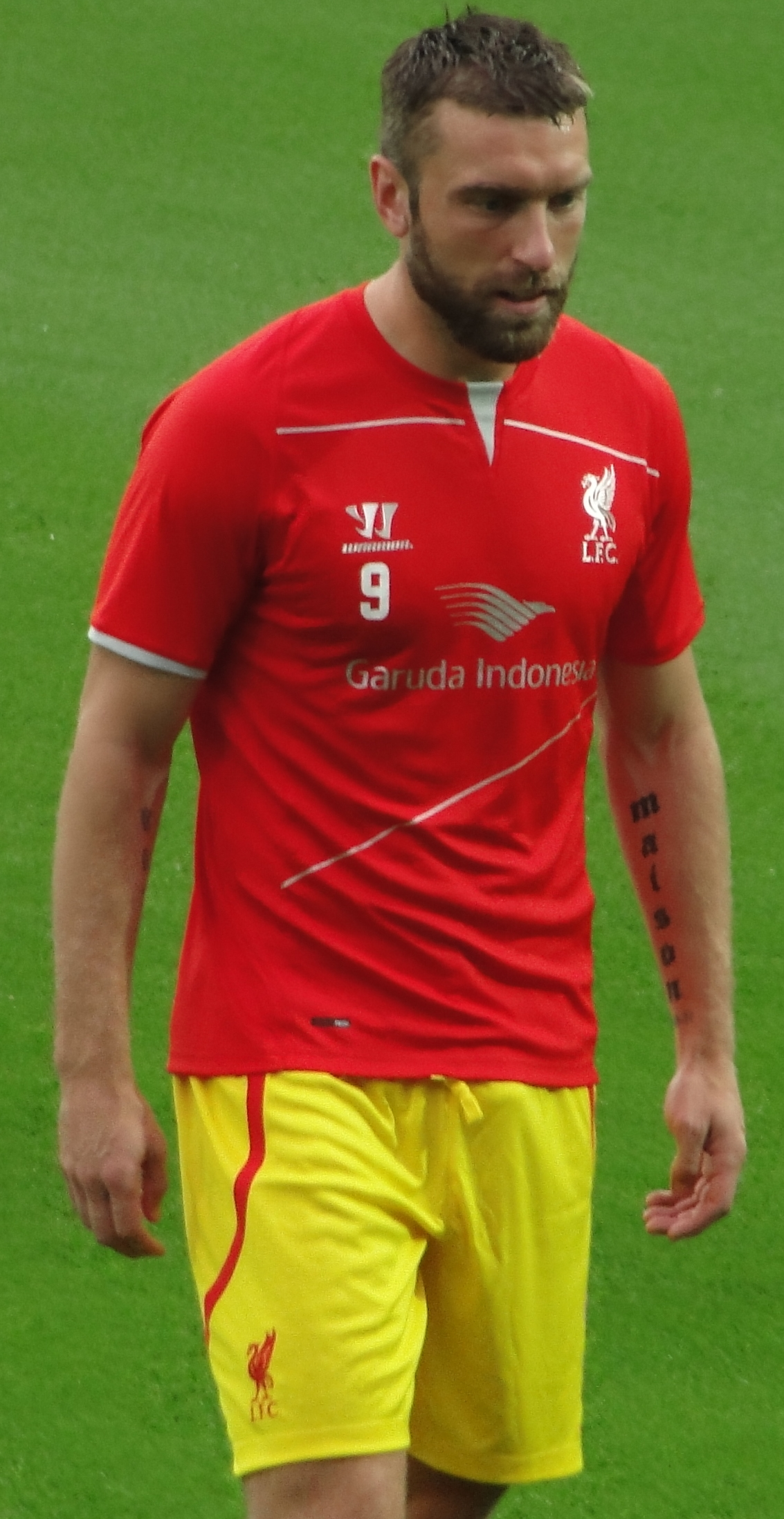
Lambert warming up with Liverpool in 2014

=== Club ===
Appearances and goals by club, season and competition
Club	Season	League			FA Cup		League Cup		Other		Total	
Club	Season	Division	Apps	Goals	Apps	Goals	Apps	Goals	Apps	Goals	Apps	Goals
Blackpool	1998–99	Second Division	0	0	0	0	0	0	0	0	0	0
Blackpool	1999–2000	Second Division	3	0	0	0	0	0	0	0	3	0
Blackpool	2000–01	Third Division	0	0	0	0	0	0	0	0	0	0
Blackpool	Total		3	0	0	0	0	0	0	0	3	0
Macclesfield Town	2000–01	Third Division	9	0	0	0	0	0	0	0	9	0
Macclesfield Town	2001–02	Third Division	35	8	4	2	0	0	1 (Note: Appearance(s) in Football League Trophy)	0	40	10
Macclesfield Town	Total		44	8	4	2	0	0	1	0	49	10
Stockport County	2002–03	Second Division	29	2	0	0	1	0	2	0	32	2
Stockport County	2003–04	Second Division	40	12	1	0	2	0	2	1	45	13
Stockport County	2004–05	League One	29	4	2	0	0	0	2	0	33	4
Stockport County	Total		98	18	3	0	3	0	6	1	110	19
Rochdale	2004–05	League Two	15	6	—		—		—		15	6
Rochdale	2005–06	League Two	46	22	1	0	1	0	2	0	50	22
Rochdale	2006–07	League Two	3	0	—		0	0	—		3	0
Rochdale	Total		64	28	1	0	1	0	2	0	68	28
Bristol Rovers	2006–07	League Two	36	8	5	0	—		8 (Note: Five appearances and one goal in Football League Trophy, three appearances and one goal in League Two play-offs)	2	49	10
Bristol Rovers	2007–08	League One	46	13	8	6	2	0	1	0	57	19
Bristol Rovers	2008–09	League One	45	29	1	0	1	0	1	0	48	29
Bristol Rovers	2009–10	League One	1	1	—		—		—		1	1
Bristol Rovers	Total		128	51	14	6	3	0	10	2	155	59
Southampton	2009–10	League One	45	30	5	2	2	1	6	3	58	36
Southampton	2010–11	League One	45	21	4	0	2	0	1	0	52	21
Southampton	2011–12	Championship	42	27	2	2	4	2	—		48	31
Southampton	2012–13	Premier League	38	15	0	0	0	0	—		38	15
Southampton	2013–14	Premier League	37	13	2	1	0	0	—		39	14
Southampton	Total		207	106	13	5	8	3	7	3	235	117
Liverpool	2014–15	Premier League	25	2	4	0	3	0	4 (Note: Three appearances and one goal in UEFA Champions League, one appearance in UEFA Europa League)	1	36	3
West Bromwich Albion	2015–16	Premier League	19	1	3	0	2	0	—		24	1
West Bromwich Albion	2016–17	Premier League	1	0	—		1	0	—		2	0
West Bromwich Albion	Total		20	1	3	0	3	0	—		26	1
Cardiff City	2016–17	Championship	18	4	1	0	—		—		19	4
Career total			607	218	43	13	21	3	30	7	701	241

=== International ===
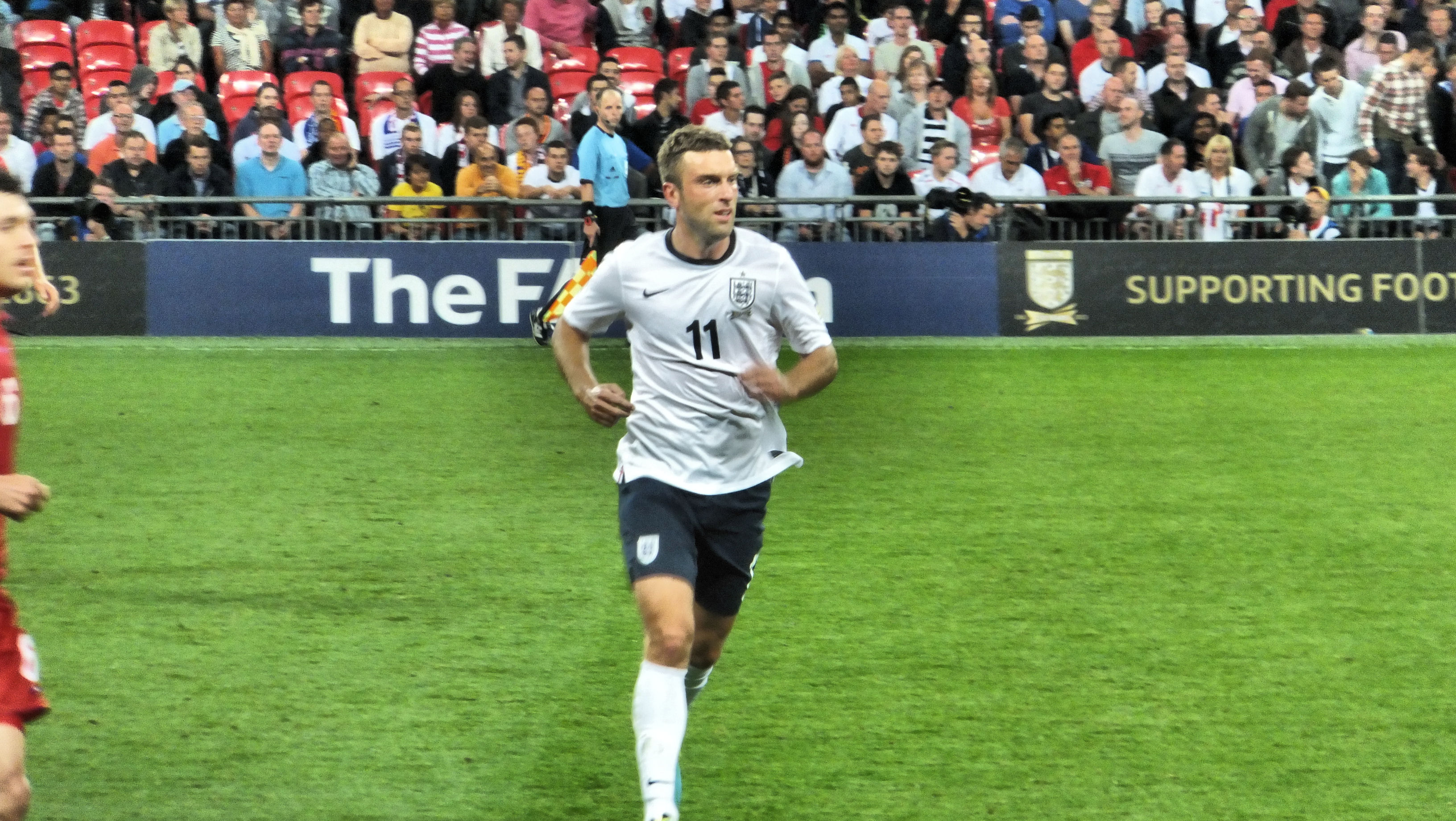
Lambert playing for England in 2013

Appearances and goals by national team and year
National team	Year	Apps	Goals
England	2013	4	2
England	2014	7	1
Total		11	3

England score listed first, score column indicates score after each Lambert goal.

International goals by date, venue, cap, opponent, score, result and competition
No.	Date	Venue	Cap	Opponent	Score	Result	Competition	Ref.
1	14 August 2013	Wembley Stadium, London, England	1	Scotland	3–2	3–2	Friendly	
2	6 September 2013	Wembley Stadium, London, England	2	Moldova	2–0	4–0	2014 FIFA World Cup qualification	
3	4 June 2014	Sun Life Stadium, Miami Gardens, United States	5	Ecuador	2–1	2–2	Friendly	

== Honours ==
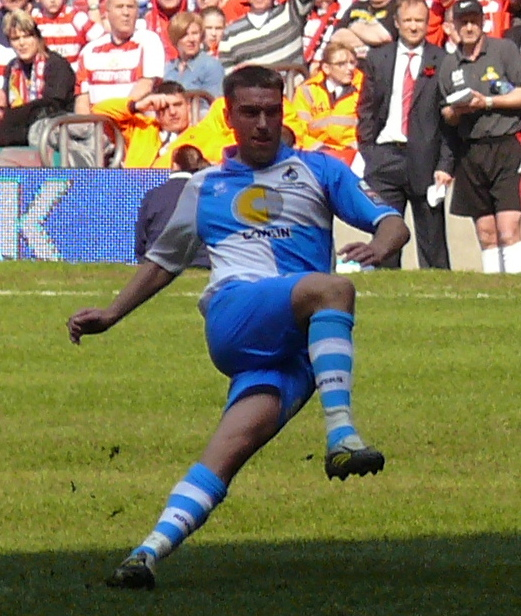
Lambert playing for Bristol Rovers in the 2007 Football League Trophy final

Bristol Rovers

- Football League Two play-offs: 2007
- Football League Trophy runner-up: 2006–07

Southampton

- Football League Championship runner-up: 2011–12
- Football League One runner-up: 2010–11
- Football League Trophy: 2009–10

Individual

- PFA Team of the Year: 2008–09 League One, 2009–10 League One, 2011–12 Championship
- PFA Fans' Player of the Year: 2009–10 League One
- Football League One Golden Boot: 2008–09
- Football League Championship Player of the Year: 2011–12
- Football League Championship Golden Boot: 2011–12
- Bristol Rovers Player of the Year: 2008–09
- Southampton Player of the Year: 2009–10, 2011–12
- Sir Tom Finney Award: 2018
- The Football League Team of the Decade
