= Ashley Probets =

English footballer

Ashley Probets (born 13 December 1984) is an English footballer who plays for Punjab United.

He started his career with Arsenal, followed by a six-month spell in The Football League with Rochdale. Since then he has plied his trade in the English non-League football, at Welling United, Barnet, Chatham Town, Thamesmead Town and VCD Athletic among others.

In July 2016 he joined Phoenix Sports from VCD Athletic and remained for three years until returning to VCD Athletic. Probets joined Punjab United in May 2022.
