= Scott Warner (footballer) =

English footballer

Personal information
- Full name: Scott John Warner
- Date of birth: 3 December 1983 (age 42)
- Place of birth: Rochdale, England
- Height: 5 ft 10 in (1.78 m)
- Position: Midfielder

Senior career*
Years	Team	Apps	(Gls)
2002–2006	Rochdale	73	(2)
2006–2007	Radcliffe Borough	34	(1)
2007	Hyde United	12	(0)
Total		119	(3)
- * Club domestic league appearances and goals

Scott John Warner (born 3 December 1983) in Rochdale is an English retired professional footballer who played as a midfielder for Rochdale in the Football League.
