= Gary Brown (footballer) =

English footballer

Personal information
- Date of birth: 29 October 1985 (age 40)
- Place of birth: Darwen, England
- Height: 5 ft 6 in (1.68 m)
- Position: Defender

Team information
- Current team: AFC Darwen

Senior career*
Years	Team	Apps	(Gls)
2004–2008	Rochdale	38	(0)
2008–2009	Runcorn Linnets		
2009–2014	AFC Darwen		
- * Club domestic league appearances and goals as of 11 January 2009 (UTC)

Gary Brown (born 29 October 1985) is an English former professional footballer.

== Court case ==
Gary was found guilty of drunken behaviour at Blackburn Magistrates' Court on 18 December 2008 after using threatening behaviour towards a policeman whilst drunk on a Darwen football pitch. He was ordered to do 150 hours community service and fined £100.
