= Jarnail Singh (referee) =

English football referee (born 1962)

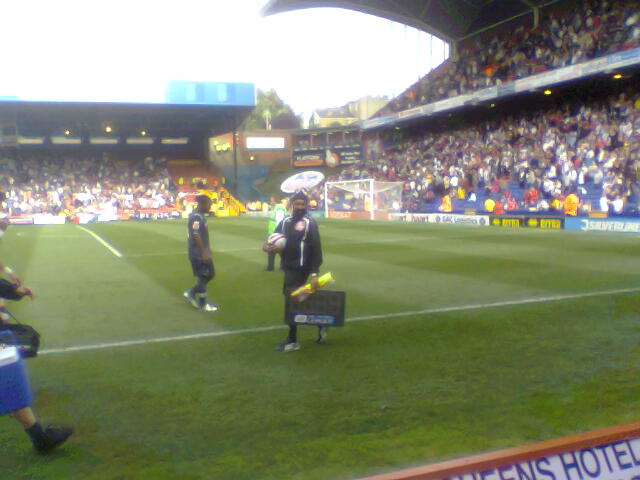
- Jarnail Singh
- Born: 5 February 1962 (age 64); Punjab, India
- Other occupation: Metropolitan Police

Domestic
Years	League	Role
? –2004	Conference South	Referee
1999–2004	Football League	Asst. referee
2004–2010	Football League	Referee

Jarnail Singh (born 5 February 1962) is an English former association football referee who officiated in the Football League.

Born in India, he moved to Wolverhampton, West Midlands, at a young age, and now lives in Hounslow, Greater London. His full-time job is as a PCSO with the Metropolitan Police in London. Singh is also an ambassador for the Football Association. He was the first Sikh to be an English football referee.

== Career ==
Singh took up refereeing in 1985, after taking his exam in order to improve his frequent outings as club linesman for the youth team he managed. He progressed through lower leagues in the Wolverhampton area and then into the Conference South regionally, before being appointed as a Football League assistant referee in 1999. Whilst still a Conference referee, he was put in charge of an FA Vase semi-final first leg tie, between Oadby Town and Brigg Town on 22 March 2003, and, shortly before his elevation to Football League referee for the 2004–05 season, he was appointed to the middle for the Football Conference Playoff semi-final first leg between Aldershot Town and Hereford United on 29 April 2004.

His first match after his promotion was the Football League Two encounter between Bristol Rovers and Bury at the Memorial Stadium on 10 August 2004, in which he sent off Colin Woodthorpe of Bury in the 65th minute.

His final match before retirement was on 1 May 2010, refereeing a League One game between Yeovil Town versus Oldham Athletic at Huish Park in Yeovil. Before the match he was unusually signing autographs and having photos taken with fans.

He has refereed at international level taking charge of a friendly game between China and UAE in October 2011.

As a role model, The FA acknowledged the importance of his visibility. In 2012, he received a Lifetime Achievement Award at the first Asian Football Awards supported by the Football Association and the anti-discrimination organisation, Kick It Out.

== Personal life ==
Singh is employed by the Metropolitan Police as a Police Community Support Officer in London, and is married with two children, Sunny and Bhupsy Gill, who are now also qualified referees. On 13 August 2022, Sunny became the first British South Asian to referee an EFL fixture, since his father, for over a decade. On 9 March 2024, Sunny became the first British South Asian to referee a Premier League match, blowing his whistle in the game between Crystal Palace and Luton Town.
