= Alan Goodall =

English footballer (born 1981)

Personal information
- Full name: Alan Jeffrey Goodall
- Date of birth: 2 December 1981 (age 44)
- Place of birth: Birkenhead, England
- Height: 5 ft 9 in (1.75 m)
- Position: Defender

Senior career*
Years	Team	Apps	(Gls)
2001–2004	Bangor City	91	(10)
2004–2007	Rochdale	120	(8)
2007–2008	Luton Town	29	(1)
2008–2010	Chesterfield	44	(3)
2010–2011	Rochdale	3	(0)
2010–2011	→ Newport County (loan)	8	(0)
2011	Stockport County	13	(0)
2011–2014	Fleetwood Town	81	(4)
2013	→ Grimsby Town (loan)	7	(0)
2014–2016	Morecambe	65	(4)
2016–2017	Altrincham	19	(0)
2018–2019	Aberystwyth Town	23	(0)
Total		503	(30)
- * Club domestic league appearances and goals

Alan Jeffrey Goodall (born 2 December 1981) is an English former professional footballer who played as a defender.

During his career, he has played. for clubs including Bangor City, Rochdale, Luton Town, Chesterfield, Newport County, Stockport County, Grimsby Town and Aberystwyth Town

== Career ==
Born in Birkenhead, Merseyside, Goodall started by playing for Poulton Victoria in Wallasey playing in midfield and then joined League of Wales club Bangor City in the summer of 2001. In his first season at the Farrar Road club, he played in the Welsh Cup final picking up a runners-up medal in the defeat against Barry Town at Park Avenue, Aberystwyth.

He was part of the team that lost narrowly in the 2002–03 UEFA Cup against FK Sartid and 2003–04 UEFA Intertoto Cup losing to Gloria Bistriţa. In 91 League of Wales appearances for City, Goodall scored ten goals. Towards the end of the 2003–04 season, he spent time on trial at Wrexham A.F.C., before joining Rochdale alongside Karl Hughes in the summer of 2004.

At the end of the 2005–06 season, Goodall's second at Spotland, he had made 74 League Two appearances scoring five times. In June 2007 Goodall signed for recently relegated League One side Luton Town on a two-year contract. He then scored on his debut in a 2–1 victory over Hartlepool United.

Goodall signed for Chesterfield on a two-year contract in August 2008 following his release from Luton Town. He scored his first goal for the club on 6 September 2008, with a 94th-minute winner against Rotherham United at Saltergate. On 31 July 2010 he rejoined Rochdale on a six-month contract. On 4 November 2010 he joined Blue Square Bet Premier side Newport County on loan and returned to Rochdale in January 2011. On 31 January 2011 he joined League Two side Stockport County making his debut for the club on 5 February against Torquay United.

In May 2011 he was informed that he would not be offered a contract by the club for the 2011/12 season.

In Summer 2011 he joined Fleetwood Town. On 2 September 2013 he joined Grimsby Town, on a one-month loan. He returned to Fleetwood on 9 October 2013 due to sustaining an injury during Grimsby's 0–3 away win at Aldershot Town the previous Saturday. He was released by Fleetwood at the end of the 2013–14 season.

On 15 July 2014, Goodall signed for Morecambe on a free transfer. He was released in summer 2016.

In 2016, Goodall joined Altrincham of the National League North. He made nineteen league appearances during the season, which concluded with relegation from the National League. He briefly served as joint caretaker manager of the club and in April 2017, having suffered a long-term injury, announced his retirement from playing at the age of 35.

In August 2018, Goodall came out of retirement and signed for Welsh Premier League club Aberystwyth Town. After making 23 appearances for the West Wales club, Goodall left Aberystwyth Town in early 2019.

== Honours ==
Fleetwood Town

- Football League Two play-offs: 2014

Individual

- Welsh Premier League Team of the Year: 2003–04
