= Paul Tait (footballer, born 1974) =

English footballer

Personal information
- Date of birth: 24 October 1974 (age 52)
- Place of birth: Newcastle upon Tyne, England
- Position: Striker

Youth career
- Wallsend Boys Club

Senior career*
Years	Team	Apps	(Gls)
1993–1994	Everton	0	(0)
1994–1995	Wigan Athletic	5	(0)
1995–1996	Runcorn		
1996–1999	Northwich Victoria	157	(65)
1999–2002	Crewe Alexandra	62	(18)
2001	→ Hull City (loan)	2	(0)
2002–2004	Bristol Rovers	74	(38)
2004–2006	Rochdale	47	(27)
2006	Chester City	19	(9)
2006	Boston United	34 = 14	
2006–2007	Southport	14	(9)
2007–2008	Northwich Victoria	16	(12)
2008–2009	Barrow	37/ goals13 = 25	

Managerial career
- 2009–2026: Everton U21s
- 2026 -: Chester (Academy Manager)
- * Club domestic league appearances and goals as of 1 May 2009

Paul Tait (born 24 October 1974) is an English former professional footballer who played as a striker. He is currently the Academy Manager at Chester.

== Playing career ==
A former Wallsend Boys Club player, then an Everton trainee, Tait became a much-travelled player, playing for ten different clubs. His most productive spells came at Crewe Alexandra between 1999 and 2002, and Bristol Rovers between 2002 and 2004.

At Chester City, Tait was the final first-team player signed by Keith Curle just over a week before the manager was dismissed in January 2006. He then played under Mark Wright and moved on to Boston United three months later.

He signed for Southport in January 2007 after initially being on loan from Boston United, although his Southport career was hampered by a serious facial injury that sidelined him for much of January 2007 and onwards. He was released by Southport in May 2007 and returned to Northwich Victoria two months later. After being placed on the transfer list by manager Dino Maamria, Tait moved on to Barrow whom he helped gain promotion to Conference National in 2008 scoring in both play-off semi-finals.

== Coaching career ==
Leaving the Bluebirds in May 2008, Tait then joined Everton in a full time coaching role. He has been involved in the development of players such as Ross Barkley, Kieran Dowell and Anthony Gordon. Tait was interim Everton manager in 2024. Tait is the first Everton manager to win a game at the Bramley Moore Dock stadium. In July 2026, following a strategic review of the academy, Tait's roel of Everton U21s head coach was deemed to longer exist.

On 12th October 2026, Tait joined Chester as the Academy manager.
