= Ben Kitchen =

English footballer (born 1986)

Personal information
- Full name: Benjamin Kitchen
- Date of birth: 19 August 1986 (age 40)
- Place of birth: Bolton, England
- Position: Midfielder

Youth career
- Preston North End
- Rochdale

Senior career*
| Years | Team | Apps | (Gls) |
| 2004-2006 | Rochdale | 9 | (0) |
- Rossendale United
- Bangor City
- Chorley
- Ramsbottom
- * Club domestic league appearances and goals

Ben Kitchen (born 19 August 1986) is an English former footballer who played as a midfielder.
