= Paul Ellender =

English footballer (born 1974)

Personal information
- Date of birth: 21 October 1974 (age 52)
- Place of birth: Scunthorpe, England
- Position: Defender

Youth career
- 199x–1993: Scunthorpe United

Senior career*
Years	Team	Apps	(Gls)
1993–1994	Scunthorpe United	0	(0)
1994–1998	Gainsborough Trinity		
1998–1999	Altrincham		
1999–2001	Scarborough	59	(6)
2001–2008	Boston United	228	(12)
2006	→ Chester City (loan)	5	(0)
2008–2009	Alfreton Town		
2009	→ Boston United (loan)	12	(1)
2009–2010	Retford United		
2010–2011	North Ferriby United		
2020–2021	Bottesford Town	3	(0)
- * Club domestic league appearances and goals as of 18:41, 19 August 2010 (UTC)

Paul Ellender (born 21 October 1974) is an English former professional footballer and former assistant manager of Bottesford Town and Also represented England "C" on 2 occasions during his career.

As a player he was a defender initially playing from 1993 to 2011, he played in the Football League for Boston United and Chester City, and having started his career at Scunthorpe United he also went on to play at Non-league level for Gainsborough Trinity, Altrincham, Scarborough, Alfreton Town, Retford United and North Ferriby United.

== Playing career ==
Born in Scunthorpe, Ellender joined Scunthorpe United as a YTS trainee, and went on to sign professional forms, but was released at the end of the 1993–94 season without having made a first-team appearance. He joined Northern Premier League club Gainsborough Trinity, where he became captain, and led the club out in their 1997–98 FA Cup first-round tie against Lincoln City. After a 1–1 draw at Lincoln's ground, Sincil Bank, Gainsborough went out 3–2 in the replay, also played at Lincoln.

Together with centre-back partner Chris Timons, Ellender joined Altrincham in 1998, and helped the club win the Northern Premier League title and gain promotion to the Conference. He was sold to fellow Conference club Scarborough in November 1999. In 2001 Ellender signed for Boston United for £80,000, which was the club's record transfer fee. He went on to captain Boston to the Conference title and promotion to the Football League in 2001–02, and remained with the club until 2008. He was loaned to Chester City in February 2006 for the remainder of the season, but was recalled a month later because of injuries among Boston defenders.

After seven years with Boston, during which time he played 275 games in all competitions, and, according to the club's website, "endeared himself to the club's supporters with a never-say-die attitude", he moved on to Alfreton Town, but re-signed for Boston United on loan in March 2009. At the end of the season, neither Boston nor Alfreton offered him a contract, and he joined Retford United for the 2009–10 season. He joined North Ferriby United during the summer of 2010.

== Coaching career ==
Having coached a number of youth teams at Bottesford Town, On 19 May 2020 Ellender was appointed as a player/coach of first team under Jimmy McNeil.

== Personal life ==
On 20 May 2021, Boston United named the restaurant at their new stadium after Ellender.
