= 2002–03 Rochdale A.F.C. season =

English football club season

Rochdale
2002–03 season
- Chairman: David Kilpatrick
- Manager: Paul Simpson
- League Division Three: 19th
- FA Cup: Fifth Round
- League Cup: First Round
- Top goalscorer: League: Lee McEvilly; All: Lee McEvilly/Paul Connor

The 2002–03 season was Rochdale A.F.C.'s 96th in existence and their 29th consecutive in the fourth tier of the English football league, named at the time as the Football League Third Division.

== Statistics ==
No.	Pos	Nat	Player	Total		League Division 3		FA Cup		League Cup		League Trophy	
No.	Pos	Nat	Player	Apps	Goals	Apps	Goals	Apps	Goals	Apps	Goals	Apps	Goals
8	MF	(England) ENG	Chris Beech	19	2	16 + 2	1	1 + 0	1	0 + 0	0	0 + 0	0
21	FW	(England) ENG	Clive Platt	49	9	40 + 2	6	6 + 0	3	1 + 0	0	0 + 0	0
31	DF	(England) ENG	Darren Hockenhull	7	1	6 + 1	1	0 + 0	0	0 + 0	0	0 + 0	0
7	MF	(England) ENG	David Flitcroft	48	2	40 + 1	2	5 + 1	0	1 + 0	0	0 + 0	0
5	DF	(Wales) WAL	Gareth Griffiths	47	7	41 + 1	6	3 + 0	1	1 + 0	0	1 + 0	0
16	MF	(Northern Ireland) NIR	Gavin Melaugh	24	2	17 + 2	1	5 + 0	1	0 + 0	0	0 + 0	0
4	MF	(England) ENG	Ian Bishop	9	0	5 + 3	0	0 + 0	0	0 + 0	0	1 + 0	0
19	FW	(England) ENG	Kevin Townson	28	1	5 + 19	1	0 + 2	0	0 + 1	0	1 + 0	0
22	DF	(Republic of Ireland) IRL	Lee Andrews	8	0	8 + 0	0	0 + 0	0	0 + 0	0	0 + 0	0
20	DF	(England) ENG	Lee Duffy	27	0	19 + 3	0	3 + 0	0	1 + 0	0	1 + 0	0
11	MF	(England) ENG	Lee Hodges	8	0	3 + 4	0	0 + 0	0	0 + 0	0	1 + 0	0
18	FW	(Northern Ireland) NIR	Lee McEvilly	43	15	27 + 10	14	4 + 1	1	0 + 0	0	1 + 0	0
10	DF	(England) ENG	Matt Doughty	47	0	39 + 2	0	4 + 0	0	1 + 0	0	1 + 0	0
13	GK	(Scotland) SCO	Matt Gilks	22	0	19 + 1	0	1 + 0	0	0 + 0	0	1 + 0	0
9	DF	(England) ENG	Michael Oliver	24	2	17 + 3	2	2 + 0	0	1 + 0	0	1 + 0	0
15	MF	(England) ENG	Michael Taylor	2	0	2 + 0	0	0 + 0	0	0 + 0	0	0 + 0	0
33	GK	(England) ENG	Neil Bennett	1	0	1 + 0	0	0 + 0	0	0 + 0	0	0 + 0	0
1	GK	(Wales) WAL	Neil Edwards	32	0	26 + 0	0	5 + 0	0	1 + 0	0	0 + 0	0
17	MF	(Northern Ireland) NIR	Paddy McCourt	30	3	12 + 14	2	0 + 2	1	0 + 1	0	0 + 1	0
27	FW	(England) ENG	Paul Connor	46	15	30 + 9	12	5 + 0	3	1 + 0	0	0 + 1	0
14	MF	(England) ENG	Paul Simpson	41	11	30 + 5	10	3 + 1	1	1 + 0	0	1 + 0	0
24	DF	(England) ENG	Richard Jobson	20	0	15 + 1	0	3 + 0	0	1 + 0	0	0 + 0	0
28	FW	(Northern Ireland) NIR	Rory Patterson	9	0	2 + 6	0	0 + 0	0	0 + 0	0	0 + 1	0
29	DF	(Northern Ireland) NIR	Scott Warner	9	0	6 + 1	0	2 + 0	0	0 + 0	0	0 + 0	0
31	DF	(Australia) AUS	Shane Cansdell-Sherriff	4	0	3 + 0	0	1 + 0	0	0 + 0	0	0 + 0	0
26	DF	(England) ENG	Simon Grand	28	2	22 + 1	2	5 + 0	0	0 + 0	0	0 + 0	0
23	DF	(England) ENG	Stephen Hill	12	1	9 + 1	1	2 + 0	0	0 + 0	0	0 + 0	0
6	DF	(England) ENG	Steve Macauley	7	0	6 + 0	0	0 + 0	0	0 + 0	0	1 + 0	0
2	DF	(Wales) WAL	Wayne Evans	47	0	40 + 0	0	6 + 0	0	1 + 0	0	0 + 0	0

== League Division Three ==
10 August 2002 1	Rochdale	1–0	Leyton Orient	Rochdale
	Macauley (yellow card) 23'; Connor 90'	Report	Smith (yellow card) 20'	Stadium: Spotland Stadium; Attendance: 3,252; Referee: Eddie Ilderton

13 August 2002 2	Lincoln City	2–0	Rochdale	Lincoln
	Yeo 58' (yellow card) 58'; Cropper 81'; Mayo (yellow card) 81'; Smith (yellow card) 85'	Report		Stadium: Sincil Bank; Attendance: 2,894; Referee: Joe Ross

17 August 2002 3	Bristol Rovers	1–2	Rochdale	Bristol
	Tait (yellow card) 13'; Bryant 45'	Report	Platt 36' (yellow card) 50'; Simpson 78'	Stadium: Memorial Stadium; Attendance: 6,478; Referee: Mark Warren

24 August 2002 4	Rochdale	1–1	Darlington	Rochdale
	McEvilly 7'; Griffiths (yellow card) 58'; Evans (yellow card) 85'	Report	Nicholls 13'; Conlon (yellow card) 33'; Wainwright (yellow card) 44'	Stadium: Spotland Stadium; Attendance: 2,834; Referee: Scott Mathieson

26 August 2002 5	Wrexham	2–5	Rochdale	Wrexham
	Thomas 13'; Morrell 38' (yellow card) 75'; Lawrence (yellow card) 41'; Holmes (yellow card) 45'	Report	McEvilly 17'; Simpson 22', 42', 59'; Griffiths 24'; Oliver (yellow card) 50'	Stadium: Racecourse Ground; Attendance: 4,340; Referee: Paul Rejer

31 August 2002 6	Rochdale	1–2	Southend United	Rochdale
	Macauley (yellow card) 0'; Duffy (yellow card) 32'; McEvilly (yellow card) 60'; Griffiths 84'	Report	Rawle 36'; Jones (yellow card) 44'; Beard (yellow card) 58'; Smith (yellow card) 60'; Bramble 83'	Stadium: Spotland Stadium; Attendance: 2,852; Referee: Carl Boyeson

6 September 2002 7	Carlisle United	0–2	Rochdale	Carlisle
	Summerbell (yellow card) 61'; Kelly (yellow card) 83'	Report	Platt 11'; Simpson 21'	Stadium: Brunton Park; Attendance: 4,501; Referee: Roy Pearson

14 September 2002 8	Rochdale	1–1	Shrewsbury Town	Rochdale
	Simpson 79' (pen.)	Report	Jemson (yellow card) 5'; Van Blerk 39'; Tolley (yellow card) 64'	Stadium: Spotland Stadium; Attendance: 2,914; Referee: Tony Bates

17 September 2002 9	Rochdale	4–3	Cambridge United	Rochdale
	Bridges 6' (o.g.); Simpson 60'; Flitcroft (yellow card) 71'; Townson 90'; Oliver 90'; McEvilly (yellow card) 90'	Report	Duncan (yellow card) 11' (yellow-red card) 14'; Bridges 23'; Tudor 42'; Wanless 52' (pen.) (yellow card) 79'	Stadium: Spotland Stadium; Attendance: 2,392; Referee: Graham Laws

21 September 2002 10	Kidderminster Harriers	0–0	Rochdale	Kidderminster
	Broughton (yellow card) 26'	Report	Griffiths (yellow card) 47'	Stadium: Aggborough Stadium; Attendance: 2,685; Referee: Keith Hill

28 September 2002 11	Rochdale	3–1	Macclesfield Town	Rochdale
	Griffiths (yellow card) 13'; Connor 21', 65'; Platt 81'	Report	Welsh 34'	Stadium: Spotland Stadium; Attendance: 3,090; Referee: Mark Clattenburg

5 October 2002 12	Swansea City	1–1	Rochdale	Swansea
	Thomas 32'; Freestone (yellow card) 45'; Mumford (yellow card) 45'; Howard (yellow card) 66'	Report	Platt (red card) 43'; Oliver (yellow card) 45'; Flitcroft (yellow card) 69'; Connor 71'	Stadium: Vetch Field; Attendance: 3,732; Referee: Rob Styles

12 October 2002 13	Hull City	3–0	Rochdale	Hull
	Jevons 28'; Branch 45', 84' (yellow card) 60'; Whittle (yellow card) 90'	Report	Flitcroft (yellow card) 13'; Jobson (yellow card) 42'; Griffiths (yellow card) 61'	Stadium: Boothferry Park; Attendance: 9,057; Referee: Phil Crossley

19 October 2002 14	Rochdale	1–2	Scunthorpe United	Rochdale
	Oliver (yellow card) 7'; Flitcroft (yellow card) 20'; Jobson (yellow card) 29'; Evans (yellow card) 43'; McCourt (yellow card) 51'; Simpson 86'	Report	Graves (yellow card) 5'; Carruthers 50', 72'; Sparrow (red card) 56'; McCombe (yellow card) 62'	Stadium: Spotland Stadium; Attendance: 3,442; Referee: Mark Cowburn

26 October 2002 15	Boston United	3–1	Rochdale	Boston
	Weatherstone 20'; Battersby 64'; Douglas 90'	Report	Duffy (yellow card) 28'; Flitcroft 81' (yellow card) 82'	Stadium: York Street; Attendance: 2,653; Referee: Brian Curson

29 October 2002 16	Rochdale	3–3	Exeter City	Rochdale
	Beech 41'; Simpson 59'; Griffiths 86'; Platt (yellow card) 89'; Flitcroft (yellow card) 90'	Report	Flack 1', 75' (yellow card) 65'; Thomas 79'; Coppinger (yellow card) 90'	Stadium: Spotland Stadium; Attendance: 1,944; Referee: Colin Webster

2 November 2002 17	Rochdale	0–1	Rushden & Diamonds	Rochdale
		Report	Lowe (yellow card) 10'; Mills (yellow card) 45'; Darby 64'	Stadium: Spotland Stadium; Attendance: 2,628; Referee: Phil Prosser

9 November 2002 18	Oxford United	2–0	Rochdale	Oxford
	Hunt 17'; Whitehead (yellow card) 19'; Basham 70'	Report		Stadium: Kassam Stadium; Attendance: 4,547; Referee: Grant Hegley

23 November 2002 19	Rochdale	0–1	York City	Rochdale
	Doughty (yellow card) 23'; Griffiths (yellow card) 87'	Report	Potter (yellow card) 35'; Duffield 71'	Stadium: Spotland Stadium; Attendance: 3,056; Referee: Mark Cowburn

30 November 2002 20	Torquay United	2–2	Rochdale	Torquay
	Gritton 52'; Benefield (yellow card) 73'; Hazell 90'	Report	Connor 74'; Griffiths 78' (yellow card) 64' (yellow-red card) 88'	Stadium: Plainmoor; Attendance: 2,754; Referee: Peter Walton

14 December 2002 21	Rochdale	4–0	Hartlepool United	Rochdale
	Platt 24'; McEvilly 43', 62'; Connor 56'; Townson (yellow card) 85'	Report		Stadium: Spotland Stadium; Attendance: 3,059; Referee: Mike Pike

21 December 2002 22	Bury	1–1	Rochdale	Bury
	Newby 62'; Billy (yellow card) 74'	Report	Melaugh (yellow card) 7'; Flitcroft (yellow card) 20'; Doughty (yellow card) 35'; McEvilly 66' (yellow card) 74'	Stadium: Gigg Lane; Attendance: 5,827; Referee: Roy Pearson

26 December 2002 23	Rochdale	2–2	Wrexham	Rochdale
	Connor 2', 18'; Duffy (yellow card) 67'; Jobson (yellow card) 74'	Report	Morrell 23', 75'	Stadium: Spotland Stadium; Attendance: 3,727; Referee: Steve Baines

28 December 2002 24	Bournemouth	3–3	Rochdale	Bournemouth
	Browning 6'; S. Fletcher 45'; O'Connor 87' (pen.); C. Fletcher (yellow card) 88'	Report	Flitcroft 16'; Melaugh (yellow card) 36'; McEvilly 45' (pen.); Grand (yellow card) 61'; Platt 73'; Warner (yellow card) 85'	Stadium: Dean Court; Attendance: 6,240; Referee: Paul Rejer

18 January 2003 25	Southend United	1–0	Rochdale	Southend
	Beard (yellow card) 41'; Bramble 89'	Report	Grand (yellow card) 55'	Stadium: Roots Hall; Attendance: 3,645; Referee: Iain Williamson

21 January 2003 26	Rochdale	0–1	Lincoln City	Rochdale
	Flitcroft (yellow card) 44'	Report	Morgan (yellow card) 16'; Yeo (yellow card) 41'; Futcher 83'	Stadium: Spotland Stadium; Attendance: 2,122; Referee: Carl Boyeson

8 February 2003 27	Rochdale	2–1	Oxford United	Rochdale
	Grand (yellow card) 40'; Oliver 44'; Melaugh 89'	Report	Savage 71'	Stadium: Spotland Stadium; Attendance: 2,764; Referee: Mike Pike

11 February 2003 28	Darlington	1–0	Rochdale	Darlington
	Conlon (yellow card) 76'; Whitehead (yellow card) 90'	Report	Platt 21'; Simpson (yellow card) 69'	Stadium: Feethams; Attendance: 2,479; Referee: Eddie Ilderton

22 February 2003 29	Rochdale	0–1	Carlisle United	Rochdale
	Flitcroft (yellow card) 41'	Report	Green 62'	Stadium: Spotland Stadium; Attendance: 3,247; Referee: Richard Beeby

25 February 2003 30	Leyton Orient	0–1	Rochdale	London
	Toner (yellow card) 45'; Tate (yellow card) 90'	Report	McEvilly (yellow card) 31' (goal) 45' (pen.); Andrews (yellow card) 90'	Stadium: Brisbane Road; Attendance: 2,633; Referee: Frazer Stretton

1 March 2003 31	Shrewsbury Town	3–1	Rochdale	Shrewsbury
	Jagielka 5', 40'; Lowe 67'	Report	Evans (yellow card) 64'; Melaugh (yellow card) 77'; McEvilly 84'	Stadium: Gay Meadow; Attendance: 3,423; Referee: Brian Curson

4 March 2003 32	Cambridge United	2–2	Rochdale	Cambridge
	Kitson 4'; Tudor 45'; Iriekpen (yellow card) 80'	Report	McEvilly 2' (yellow card) 37'; McCourt 51' (yellow card) 70'; Duffy (yellow card) 70'	Stadium: Abbey Stadium; Attendance: 2,586; Referee: Howard Webb

11 March 2003 33	Rochdale	1–1	Bournemouth	Rochdale
	Duffy (yellow card) 30'; Griffiths 49'	Report	Fletcher 31'	Stadium: Spotland Stadium; Attendance: 1,958; Referee: Andy Penn

15 March 2003 34	Rochdale	1–0	Boston United	Rochdale
	Flitcroft (yellow card) 33'; McEvilly 75' (pen.); Duffy (yellow card) 85'	Report	Chapman (yellow card) 37'; Ellender (yellow card) 68'	Stadium: Spotland Stadium; Attendance: 2,538; Referee: Trevor Parkes

18 March 2003 35	Scunthorpe United	3–1	Rochdale	Scunthorpe
	Hayes 10', 66'; Kilford 31'; Beagrie (yellow card) 51'; Carruthers (yellow card) 52'; Graves (yellow card) 61'	Report	McCourt 13'; Flitcroft (yellow card) 21'; McEvilly (yellow card) 45'; Duffy (yellow card) 79'; Grand (yellow card) 89'	Stadium: Glanford Park; Attendance: 3,616; Referee: Mark Clattenburg

22 March 2003 36	Exeter City	1–1	Rochdale	Exeter
	Walker 15' (pen.); Curran (yellow card) 87'	Report	Connor 30' (pen.); Beech (yellow card) 43'	Stadium: St James Park; Attendance: 4,003; Referee: Keith Hill

24 March 2003 37	Rushden & Diamonds	3–3	Rochdale	Irthlingborough
	Hall 49'; Lowe 65', 73'	Report	Simpson 27'; Grand 63'; McCourt 87'	Stadium: Nene Park; Attendance: 3,444; Referee: Lee Cable

5 April 2003 38	Rochdale	0–2	Torquay United	Rochdale
	Melaugh (yellow card) 49'	Report	Griffiths 18' (o.g.); Clist 52'; Gritton (yellow card) 71'	Stadium: Spotland Stadium; Attendance: 2,216; Referee: Phil Joslin

8 April 2003 39	Rochdale	1–1	Bristol Rovers	Rochdale
	Connor 21'	Report	Astafjevs 44'	Stadium: Spotland Stadium; Attendance: 1,658; Referee: Matt Messias

12 April 2003 40	York City	2–2	Rochdale	York
	Graydon 35' (pen.) (yellow card) 39'; Edmondson 63'	Report	Connor 3' (yellow card) 36'; McCourt (yellow card) 25'; McEvilly 70' (pen.)	Stadium: Bootham Crescent; Attendance: 3,966; Referee: Paul Robinson

15 April 2003 41	Rochdale	0–1	Kidderminster Harriers	Rochdale
	Flitcroft (yellow card) 80'	Report	Hinton (yellow card) 80'; Shilton 83'	Stadium: Spotland Stadium; Attendance: 1,810; Referee: Eddie Ilderton

18 April 2003 42	Rochdale	1–2	Bury	Rochdale
15:00 BST	Flitcroft (yellow card) 22'; Simpson (yellow card) 24'; Stuart 34' (o.g.)	Report	Nelson 23'; Cramb 71' (pen.); Connell (yellow card) 90'	Stadium: Spotland Stadium; Attendance: 4,513; Referee: Mike Dean

21 April 2003 43	Hartlepool United	2–2	Rochdale	Hartlepool
	Widdrington 42', 52'	Report	Grand 23'; McEvilly 45'	Stadium: Victoria Park; Attendance: 5,408; Referee: Steve Baines

26 April 2003 44	Rochdale	1–2	Swansea City	Rochdale
	Griffiths 43'	Report	Nugent 18'; Richards 68'	Stadium: Spotland Stadium; Attendance: 2,777; Referee: Frazer Stretton

29 April 2003 45	Rochdale	2–1	Hull City	Rochdale
	McEvilly 6'; Griffiths (yellow card) 16'; Hockenhull 18' (yellow card) 27'; Evans (yellow card) 81'	Report	Melton (yellow card) 24'; Burgess 65'; Reeves (yellow card) 87'	Stadium: Spotland Stadium; Attendance: 2,225; Referee: Phil Prosser

3 May 2003 46	Macclesfield Town	3–2	Rochdale	Macclesfield
	Lightbourne (yellow card) 34'; Hockenhull 48' (o.g.); Askey 88'; Tipton 90'	Report	Hockenhull (yellow card) 27'; McEvilly 36' (pen.); Patterson (yellow card) 51'; Hill 70'	Stadium: Moss Rose; Attendance: 2,873; Referee: Keith Hill

== FA Cup ==
16 November 2002 1	Rochdale	3–2	Peterborough United	Rochdale
	Connor 3'; Platt 12'; Beech 61'	Report	Burton (yellow card) 11'; Daníelsson (yellow card) 25'; Fenn 83'; Clarke 88'	Stadium: Spotland Stadium; Attendance: 2,566; Referee: Alan Kaye

7 December 2002 2	Bristol Rovers	1–1	Rochdale	Bristol
	Plummer (yellow card) 59'; Allen 73'	Report	Platt 6'	Stadium: Memorial Stadium; Attendance: 4,369; Referee: Trevor Parkes

17 December 2002 2	Rochdale	3–2	Bristol Rovers	Rochdale
	Platt 34' (yellow card) 65'; Flitcroft (yellow card) 47'; Connor 48'; McCourt (yellow card) 74' (goal) 80'	Report	Barrett 19' (yellow card) 85'; Astafjevs (yellow card) 46'; Tait 51'	Stadium: Spotland Stadium; Attendance: 2,206; Referee: Trevor Parkes

4 January 2003 3	Preston North End	1–2	Rochdale	Preston
	Lucketti (yellow card) 20'; Anderson 48' (yellow card) 58'; Broomes (yellow card) 53'	Report	Jobson (yellow card) 18'; McEvilly 39'; Simpson 54'; Connor (yellow card) 64'; Flitcroft (yellow card) 88'; Grand (yellow card) 90'	Stadium: Deepdale; Attendance: 8,762; Referee: Roy Pearson

25 January 2003 4	Rochdale	2–0	Coventry City	Rochdale
	Connor 33'; Griffiths 47'	Report	Pead (yellow card) 37'	Stadium: Spotland Stadium; Attendance: 9,156; Referee: Mick Fletcher

16 February 2003 5	Wolverhampton Wanderers	3–1	Rochdale	Wolverhampton
19:00 GMT	Ndah 32'; Miller 79'; Proudlock 90'	Report	Grand (yellow card) 31'; Melaugh (yellow card) 41' (goal) 52'	Stadium: Molineux Stadium; Attendance: 23,921; Referee: Uriah Rennie

== League Cup ==
11 September 2002 1	Sheffield Wednesday	1–0	Rochdale	Sheffield
	Sibon 2'	Report		Stadium: Hillsborough Stadium; Attendance: 8,815; Referee: George Cain

== League Trophy ==
22 October 2002 1	Rochdale	0–1	Bury	Rochdale
	Macauley (yellow card) 69'	Report	Johnrose (yellow card) 24'; Woodthorpe 72'; Hill (yellow card) 89'	Stadium: Spotland Stadium; Attendance: 2,486; Referee: Mike Ryan
