= 1996–97 Millwall F.C. season =

Millwall
1996–97 season
- Chairman: Peter Mead
- Manager: Jimmy Nicholl (until 10 February); John Docherty (from 10 February)
- Stadium: The Den
- Second Division: 14th
- FA Cup: First round
- League Cup: First round
- Auto Windscreens Shield: Second round
- Top goalscorer: League: Stevie Crawford (11); All: Stevie Crawford (15)
- Average home league attendance: 7,743

During the 1996–97 English football season, Millwall F.C. competed in the Football League Second Division.

== Season summary ==
In the 1996–97 season, Millwall had a tough finish to the campaign after being top of the table at the beginning of December which included a poor run of just five wins from their remaining 26 league games that saw them plummet down the table and ended up finishing in a disappointing 14th place. The club also experienced extreme financial difficulties that resulted in them being placed in financial administration for a short time. Jimmy Nicholl was relieved of his duties in February and John Docherty returned on a short term basis to stabilise the club at playing level.

== Final league table ==
Pos	Team	Pld	W	D	L	GF	GA	GD	Pts
12	Walsall	46	19	10	17	54	53	+1	67
13	Watford	46	16	19	11	45	38	+7	67
14	Millwall	46	16	13	17	50	55	−5	61
15	Preston North End	46	18	7	21	49	55	−6	61
16	Bournemouth	46	15	15	16	43	45	−2	60

Rules for classification: In the Football League goals scored (GF) takes precedence over goal difference (GD).

== Results ==
Millwall's score comes first

=== Legend ===
Win	Draw	Loss

=== Football League Second Division ===
Date	Opponent	Venue	Result	Attendance	Scorers
17 August 1996	Wrexham	H	1–1	9,371	Crawford (pen)
24 August 1996	Watford	A	2–0	9,495	Harle, Crawford
27 August 1996	York City	A	2–3	3,108	Savage, Malkin
31 August 1996	Burnley	H	2–1	9,281	Newman, Neill
7 September 1996	Bristol Rovers	H	2–0	7,881	Rogan, Huckerby
10 September 1996	Peterborough United	A	3–3	4,442	Huckerby, Neill, Malkin
14 September 1996	Notts County	A	2–1	4,473	Neill, Robinson (own goal)
21 September 1996	Crewe Alexandra	H	2–0	9,320	Huckerby, Dair
28 September 1996	Preston North End	A	1–2	9,400	Newman
2 October 1996	Stockport County	H	3–4	7,537	Rogan (2), Hartley
5 October 1996	Plymouth Argyle	A	0–0	7,507	
12 October 1996	Chesterfield	H	2–1	7,765	Neill, Rogan
16 October 1996	Bury	H	1–0	6,447	Rogan
19 October 1996	Gillingham	A	3–2	9,305	Crawford (2), Hartley
26 October 1996	Brentford	A	0–0	7,691	
30 October 1996	Blackpool	H	2–1	7,179	Rogan (2 pens)
2 November 1996	Walsall	H	1–0	9,176	Crawford
9 November 1996	Bristol City	A	1–1	12,326	Crawford
20 November 1996	Shrewsbury Town	H	2–1	5,770	Crawford (2)
23 November 1996	Rotherham United	A	0–0	3,286	
29 November 1996	Brentford	H	0–0	7,845	
3 December 1996	Wycombe Wanderers	A	0–1	4,550	
14 December 1996	Bournemouth	A	1–1	4,494	Bright
18 December 1996	Luton Town	H	0–1	7,077	
26 December 1996	Peterborough United	H	0–2	8,118	
11 January 1997	Preston North End	H	3–2	7,096	Cadette, Crawford, Savage
18 January 1997	Stockport County	A	1–5	7,502	Webber
25 January 1997	Blackpool	A	0–3	4,523	
1 February 1997	Bristol City	H	0–2	9,158	
8 February 1997	Walsall	A	1–2	3,833	Bowry
15 February 1997	Rotherham United	H	2–0	7,043	Crawford, Gayle (own goal)
22 February 1997	Shrewsbury Town	A	1–1	2,968	Doyle
25 February 1997	Notts County	H	1–0	5,202	Savage
1 March 1997	Wycombe Wanderers	H	2–1	7,539	Hartley, Dolby
8 March 1997	Luton Town	A	2–0	8,585	Dolby, Hartley
15 March 1997	Bournemouth	H	0–1	9,992	
18 March 1997	Crewe Alexandra	A	0–0	3,695	
22 March 1997	Watford	H	0–1	8,713	
28 March 1997	Wrexham	A	3–3	4,634	Crawford, Newman, Rogan (pen)
2 April 1997	York City	H	1–1	6,161	Webber
5 April 1997	Burnley	A	0–1	9,840	
8 April 1997	Bristol Rovers	A	0–1	5,324	
12 April 1997	Plymouth Argyle	H	0–0	5,702	
19 April 1997	Chesterfield	A	0–1	5,935	
26 April 1997	Gillingham	H	0–2	8,946	
3 May 1997	Bury	A	0–2	9,785	

=== FA Cup ===
Round	Date	Opponent	Venue	Result	Attendance	Goalscorers
R1	15 November 1996	Woking	A	2–2	5,448	Savage, Crawford
R1R	26 November 1996	Woking	H	0–1	6,048	

=== League Cup ===
Round	Date	Opponent	Venue	Result	Attendance	Goalscorers
R1 1st Leg	21 August 1996	Peterborough United	H	1–0	5,145	Malkin
R1 2nd Leg	3 September 1996	Peterborough United	A	0–2 (lost 1–2 on agg)	4,610	

=== Football League Trophy ===
Round	Date	Opponent	Venue	Result	Attendance	Goalscorers
SR1	7 December 1996	Hereford United	A	4–0	1,710	Dair (2), Crawford (2)
SR2	7 January 1997	Colchester United	H	2–3	2,795	Crawford, Savage

== Squad ==
Note: Flags indicate national team as defined under FIFA eligibility rules; some limited exceptions apply. Players may hold more than one non-FIFA nationality.

No.	Pos.	Nation	Player
—	GK	ENG	Tim Carter
—	GK	UGA	Andy Iga
—	GK	ENG	David Nurse
—	DF	IRL	Scott Fitzgerald (on loan from Wimbledon)
—	DF	ENG	Mike Harle
—	DF	SCO	Gerard Lavin
—	DF	ENG	Alan McLeary
—	DF	AUS	Lucas Neill
—	DF	ENG	Ricky Newman
—	DF	NIR	Anton Rogan
—	DF	SCO	David Sinclair
—	DF	ENG	Keith Stevens
—	DF	ENG	Damien Webber
—	DF	ENG	Tony Witter
—	MF	ENG	Greg Berry
—	MF	CAN	Marc Bircham
—	MF	SKN	Bobby Bowry
—	MF	ENG	Dean Canoville

No.	Pos.	Nation	Player
—	MF	SCO	Jason Dair
—	MF	ENG	Tony Dolby
—	MF	ENG	Maurice Doyle
—	MF	ENG	Steve Forbes
—	MF	SCO	Paul Hartley
—	MF	SCO	Graham Robertson
—	MF	IRL	Stephen Roche
—	MF	IRL	Dave Savage
—	MF	AUS	Jason van Blerk
—	MF	ENG	Ray Wilkins
—	FW	ENG	Mark Bright (on loan from Sheffield Wednesday)
—	FW	ENG	Richard Cadette
—	FW	SCO	Stevie Crawford
—	FW	ENG	Danny Hockton
—	FW	ENG	Darren Huckerby
—	FW	ENG	Chris Malkin
—	FW	ENG	Lee McRobert
—	FW	IRL	Richard Sadlier
