= 1995–96 Millwall F.C. season =

- Manager: (Republic of Ireland) Mick McCarthy (until 3 February) (Northern Ireland) Jimmy Nicholl (from 28 February)
- Stadium: The Den
- First Division: 22nd (relegated)
- FA Cup: Third round
- League Cup: Third round
- Top goalscorer: League: All: Alex Rae (16)

During the 1995–96 English football season, Millwall F.C. competed in the Football League First Division, the second tier of English football.

== Season summary ==
The season started brightly for Millwall, as the Lions went top of the First Division from almost the start of the season and stayed in the automatic promotion places for the first third of the season. Despite three straight losses, Millwall were still top of an admittedly tight First Division as December arrived. However, manager Mick McCarthy left to manage Ireland after a 6–0 defeat at Sunderland saw Millwall lose top spot; under his successor, Jimmy Nicholl, Millwall went into freefall with only four more wins all season. A draw on the last day of the season condemned the Lions to relegation.

== Final league table ==
Pos	Team	Pld	W	D	L	GF	GA	GD	Pts	Qualification or relegation
20	Wolverhampton Wanderers	46	13	16	17	56	62	−6	55	
21	Portsmouth	46	13	13	20	61	69	−8	52	
22	Millwall (R)	46	13	13	20	43	63	−20	52	Relegation to the Second Division
23	Watford (R)	46	10	18	18	62	70	−8	48	Relegation to the Second Division
24	Luton Town (R)	46	11	12	23	40	64	−24	45	Relegation to the Second Division

Rules for classification: 1) Points; 2) Goals scored; 3) Goal difference
(R) Relegated

== Squad ==
Squad at end of season

Note: Flags indicate national team as defined under FIFA eligibility rules; some limited exceptions apply. Players may hold more than one non-FIFA nationality.

No.	Pos.	Nation	Player
—	GK	ENG	Tim Carter
—	GK	USA	Kasey Keller
—	DF	ENG	Mark Beard
—	DF	ENG	Mike Harle
—	DF	ENG	Gerard Lavin
—	DF	ENG	Keith Stevens
—	DF	ENG	Ben Thatcher
—	DF	ENG	Damien Webber
—	DF	ENG	Tony Witter
—	DF	NIR	Anton Rogan
—	DF	RUS	Vasili Kulkov (on loan from Spartak Moscow)
—	DF	AUS	Lucas Neill
—	DF	AUS	Jason van Blerk
—	MF	ENG	Mickey Bennett
—	MF	ENG	Greg Berry
—	MF	ENG	Bobby Bowry
—	MF	ENG	Maurice Doyle

No.	Pos.	Nation	Player
—	MF	ENG	Steve Forbes
—	MF	ENG	Ricky Newman
—	MF	SCO	Alex Rae
—	MF	SCO	Mickey Weir (on loan from Hibernian)
—	MF	IRL	Dave Savage
—	FW	ENG	Richard Cadette
—	FW	ENG	Kerry Dixon
—	FW	ENG	Chris Malkin
—	FW	ENG	Lee McRobert
—	FW	ENG	Scott Taylor
—	FW	GER	Uwe Fuchs
—	FW	RUS	Sergei Yuran
—	FW	USA	John Kerr
—	GK		Dave Wietcha
—	MF		Jim Connor
—			Phil O'Neil

=== Left club during season ===
Note: Flags indicate national team as defined under FIFA eligibility rules; some limited exceptions apply. Players may hold more than one non-FIFA nationality.

No.	Pos.	Nation	Player
—	GK	IRL	Nick Colgan (on loan from Chelsea)
—	GK	DEN	Jimmy Nielsen (to AaB)
—	MF	ENG	Dale Gordon (on loan from West Ham United)

No.	Pos.	Nation	Player
—	MF	NIR	Kingsley Black (on loan from Nottingham Forest)
—	FW	USA	John Kerr (on loan to Walsall)
—	FW	AUS	Alistair Edwards (to Sydney Olympic)

== Transfers ==
=== In ===
- (England) Mickey Bennett – (England) Charlton Athletic, July
- (England) Bobby Bowry – (England) Crystal Palace, July
- (Australia) Lucas Neill – (Australia) Australian Institute of Sport, July
- (Northern Ireland) Anton Rogan – (England) Oxford United, August
- (Republic of Ireland) Nick Colgan – (England) Chelsea, September, loan
- (Russia) Vasili Kulkov – (Russia) Spartak Moscow, January, loan
- (England) Tim Carter – (England) Oxford United, January
- (Scotland) Mickey Weir – (Scotland) Hibernian, January, loan
- (Russia) Sergei Yuran – (Russia) Spartak Moscow, January

=== Out ===
- (England) Roger Joseph – (England) Wimbledon, June
- (United States) John Kerr – (England) Walsall, June, loan
- (Australia) Dave Mitchell – (Malaysia) Selangor, June
- (England) Andy Roberts – (England) Crystal Palace, July
- (England) David Oldfield – (England) Luton Town, July
- (Australia) Alistair Edwards – (Australia) Sydney Olympic, January

== Results ==
=== First Division ===
29 August 1995	Reading	1–2	Millwall	Elm Park
	Gooding		Rae; Dixon

- 23 September: Millwall 1–2 Sunderland (Scott pen., Smith); attendance 8,691
- 1 October: Derby County 2–2 Millwall (Willems, van der Lann; ?); attendance 9,590
- 22 October: Crystal Palace 1–2 Millwall (Gordon; ?); attendance 14,338
- 28 October: Millwall 2–1 West Bromwich Albion (?; Hunt); attendance 9,717
- 18 November: Millwall 0–0 Huddersfield Town; attendance 9,402
- 9 December: Sunderland 6–0 Millwall (Russell 4, Scott pen., P Gray); attendance 18,951
- 16 December: Millwall 0–1 Derby County (Sturridge); attendance 7,694
- 26 December: Wolverhampton Wanderers 1–1 Millwall (Bull; ?); attendance 25,591
- 4 November: Birmingham City 2–2 Millwall (Castle, Charlery; Dixon, Rae); attendance 23,016
- 27 January: Millwall 1–1 Portsmouth (Burton); attendance 7,710

10 February 1996	Millwall	1–1	Reading	The Den
	Newman		Bowry ?' (o.g.)

- 2 March: Millwall 0–1 Wolverhampton Wanderers (Bull); attendance 9,13
- 30 March: Millwall 1–4 Crystal Palace (Hopkin, Brown, Ndah 2); attendance 13,214
- 6 April: West Bromwich Albion 1–0 Millwall (Sneekes); attendance 13,793
- 10 April: Millwall 2–0 Birmingham City (?); attendance 9,271
- 13 April: Huddersfield Town 3–0 Millwall (Jepson pen., Edwards, Booth); attendance 11,206
