= 1994–95 Millwall F.C. season =

Millwall
1994–95 season
- Chairman: Reg Burr
- Manager: Mick McCarthy
- Stadium: The Den
- First Division: 12th
- FA Cup: Fifth round
- League Cup: Fifth round
- Top goalscorer: League: Rae (10); All: Goodman/Rae (10)
- Average home league attendance: 7,685

During the 1994–95 English football season, Millwall F.C. competed in the Football League First Division.

== Season summary ==
In the 1994–95 season, expectations for another promotion push remained unfulfilled with the Lions finishing in 12th place. However, there was plenty of excitement in cup competitions back in 1995 with Premier League giants Nottingham Forest, Arsenal and Chelsea all falling victim to the Lions on their own grounds in the two major competitions.

== Final league table ==
Pos	Team	Pld	W	D	L	GF	GA	GD	Pts
10	Grimsby Town	46	17	14	15	62	56	+6	65
11	Stoke City	46	16	15	15	50	53	−3	63
12	Millwall	46	16	14	16	60	60	0	62
13	Southend United	46	18	8	20	54	73	−19	62
14	Oldham Athletic	46	16	13	17	60	60	0	61

Rules for classification: 1) Points; 2) Goals scored; 3) Goal difference

== Results ==
Millwall's score comes first

=== Legend ===
Win	Draw	Loss

=== Football League First Division ===
Date	Opponent	Venue	Result	Attendance	Scorers
13 August 1994	Southend United	H	3–1	8,283	Mitchell, Goodman, Tilson (own goal)
20 August 1994	Sunderland	A	1–1	17,296	Rae
27 August 1994	Derby County	H	4–1	8,809	Rae, Kerr (3)
30 August 1994	Bolton Wanderers	A	0–1	9,519	
3 September 1994	Reading	A	0–0	8,715	
10 September 1994	West Bromwich Albion	H	2–2	8,378	Goodman (2)
14 September 1994	Burnley	H	2–3	7,375	Savage, Rae (pen)
17 September 1994	Tranmere Rovers	A	1–3	6,243	Roberts
24 September 1994	Luton Town	H	0–0	7,150	
1 October 1994	Middlesbrough	A	0–3	17,229	
8 October 1994	Bristol City	A	0–1	7,499	
15 October 1994	Stoke City	H	1–1	7,856	Goodman
22 October 1994	Wolverhampton Wanderers	A	3–3	25,059	Goodman (2), Cadette
29 October 1994	Sheffield United	H	2–1	8,445	Kennedy (pen), Cadette
2 November 1994	Portsmouth	H	2–2	7,108	Goodman, Rae
5 November 1994	Swindon Town	A	2–1	9,311	Goodman, Kennedy
12 November 1994	Grimsby Town	A	0–1	5,261	
19 November 1994	Barnsley	H	0–1	7,040	
26 November 1994	Port Vale	A	1–2	8,016	Kennedy
4 December 1994	Wolverhampton Wanderers	H	1–0	8,203	Mitchell
10 December 1994	Sunderland	H	2–0	7,698	Kennedy, Mitchell
17 December 1994	Southend United	A	1–0	5,833	Cadette
26 December 1994	Notts County	A	1–0	6,758	Mitchell
27 December 1994	Watford	H	2–1	12,289	Rae, Cadette
1 January 1995	Charlton Athletic	A	1–1	10,655	Rae
3 January 1995	Oldham Athletic	H	1–1	7,438	Rae
14 January 1995	Sheffield United	A	1–1	12,650	Beard
4 February 1995	Grimsby Town	H	2–0	7,373	Kennedy, Roberts
21 February 1995	Barnsley	A	1–4	4,733	Webber
26 February 1995	Middlesbrough	H	0–0	7,247	
1 March 1995	Swindon Town	H	3–1	5,950	Rae (2), Van Blerk
4 March 1995	Luton Town	A	1–1	6,864	Mitchell
8 March 1995	Reading	H	2–0	7,546	Oldfield, Mitchell
11 March 1995	Derby County	A	2–3	12,490	Rae, Mitchell
15 March 1995	Portsmouth	A	2–3	6,032	Oldfield, Witter
19 March 1995	Bolton Wanderers	H	0–1	6,103	
22 March 1995	West Bromwich Albion	A	0–3	11,782	
25 March 1995	Tranmere Rovers	H	2–1	7,470	Dixon, Roberts
1 April 1995	Burnley	A	2–1	10,454	Oldfield (2)
5 April 1995	Port Vale	H	1–3	5,260	Oldfield
8 April 1995	Charlton Athletic	H	3–1	9,508	McRobert, Thatcher, Dixon
14 April 1995	Watford	A	0–1	6,907	
19 April 1995	Notts County	H	0–0	5,471	
22 April 1995	Oldham Athletic	A	1–0	6,319	Savage
29 April 1995	Stoke City	A	3–4	9,111	Dixon, Webber, Oldfield
7 May 1995	Bristol City	H	1–1	8,805	Dixon

=== FA Cup ===
Round	Date	Opponent	Venue	Result	Attendance	Goalscorers
R3	7 January 1995	Arsenal	H	0–0	17,718	
R3R	18 January 1995	Arsenal	A	2–0	32,319	Beard, Kennedy
R4	28 January 1995	Chelsea	H	0–0	18,573	
R4R	8 February 1995	Chelsea	A	1–1 AET (won 5–4 on pens)	25,515	
R5	18 February 1995	Queens Park Rangers	A	0–1	16,457	

=== League Cup ===
Round	Date	Opponent	Venue	Result	Attendance	Goalscorers
R2 First Leg	21 September 1994	Sunderland	H	2–1	5,095	Goodman, Kennedy
R2 Second Leg	4 October 1994	Sunderland	A	1–1 (won 3–2 on agg)	9,698	Goodman
R3	25 October 1994	Mansfield Town	A	2–0	5,359	Cadette, Kennedy
R4	30 November 1994	Nottingham Forest	A	2–0	12,393	Berry (2)
R5	11 January 1995	Swindon Town	A	1–3	5,095	Mitchell

== Squad ==
Note: Flags indicate national team as defined under FIFA eligibility rules; some limited exceptions apply. Players may hold more than one non-FIFA nationality.

No.	Pos.	Nation	Player
—	GK	(United States) USA	Kasey Keller
—	GK	(Denmark) DEN	Jimmy Nielsen
—	GK	(England) ENG	Tim Carter
—	GK	(England) ENG	Dave Wietecha
—	DF	(England) ENG	Mark Beard
—	DF	(Republic of Ireland) IRL	Kenny Cunningham
—	DF	(England) ENG	Tony Witter
—	DF	(England) ENG	Keith Stevens
—	DF	(England) ENG	Damien Webber
—	DF	(Wales) WAL	Ben Thatcher
—	DF	(Republic of Ireland) IRL	Mark Kennedy
—	DF	(England) ENG	Ian Dawes
—	DF	(Republic of Ireland) IRL	Tony McCarthy
—	DF	(Wales) WAL	Pat Van Den Hauwe
—	DF	(England) ENG	Roger Joseph (on loan from Wimbledon)
—	DF	(England) ENG	Richard Huxford
—	MF	(Scotland) SCO	Alex Rae
—	MF	(England) ENG	Andy Roberts
—	MF	(Republic of Ireland) IRL	Dave Savage
—	MF	(Australia) AUS	Jason van Blerk
—	MF	(Australia) AUS	David Oldfield (on loan from Leicester City)

No.	Pos.	Nation	Player
—	MF	(England) ENG	Andy May
—	MF	(England) ENG	Greg Berry
—	MF	(England) ENG	Danny Chapman
—	MF	(England) ENG	Tony Kelly
—	MF	(England) ENG	James Connor
—	MF	(England) ENG	Phil Barber
—	MF	(England) ENG	Jermaine Wright
—	MF	(England) ENG	Steve Forbes
—	MF	(England) ENG	Tony Dolby
—	FW	(Australia) AUS	Dave Mitchell
—	FW	(Republic of Ireland) IRL	Jon Goodman
—	FW	(England) ENG	Richard Cadette
—	FW	(England) ENG	Kerry Dixon
—	FW	(United States) USA	John Kerr
—	FW	(England) ENG	Jason Beckford
—	FW	(Australia) AUS	Alistair Edwards
—	FW	(England) ENG	Lee McRobert
—	FW	(England) ENG	Scott Taylor
—	FW	(England) ENG	Clive Allen
—	FW	(England) ENG	Neville Gordon
