= List of English football transfers winter 2002–03 =

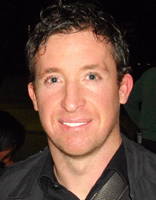
Robbie Fowler moved from Leeds United to Manchester City in January 2003 for £6 million. This was the second biggest transfer behind Jonathan Woodgate's move from Leeds to Newcastle United.

The English football transfer window for winter 2002–03 ran from 1 January 2003 until 1 February 2003, although a few transfers took place prior to that date. Players without a club could join one at any time, either during or in between transfer windows. Clubs below Premier League level could also sign players on loan at any time. If need be, clubs could sign a goalkeeper on an emergency loan, if all others were unavailable.

The decision to introduce restrictions on the period that clubs could buy and sell players was controversial. Some owners were worried that it could harm clubs with smaller squads that were in financial difficulty, particularly in the wake of the collapse of ITV Digital, which had been funding football league teams. Players who were out of contract before 31 August 2002 were available for transfer, however, under the FIFA regulations.

The winter transfer window, which was introduced for the first time this season, was relatively quiet for the first 30 days, with 107 deals totalling £17.54 million. Jonathan Woodgate's transfer from Leeds United to Newcastle United on 31 January was the most expensive transfer at £9 million. Malcolm Christie, Jamie Clapham, Robbie Fowler, Danny Higginbotham, Mart Poom, David Prutton, Michael Ricketts, Chris Riggott, David Sommeil and Matthew Upson all moved clubs for more than £1 million.

== Transfers ==
Only moves featuring at least one Premier League or First Division club are listed. The list is complete, although sometimes loan spells that were extended are covered as a single transfer.

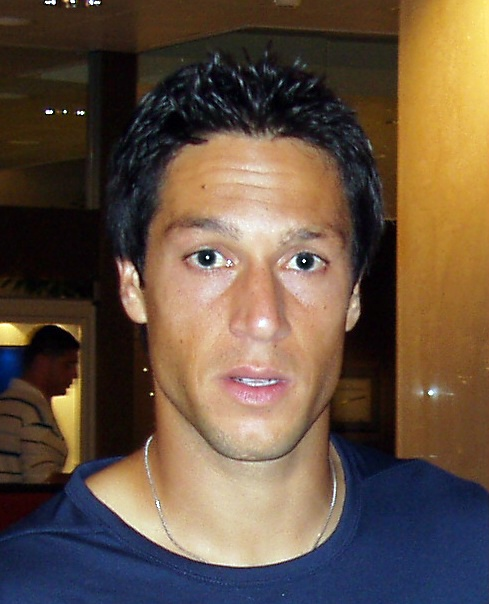
Idan Tal was a free signing for Everton when he moved from Spanish club Rayo Vallecano in September 2002.

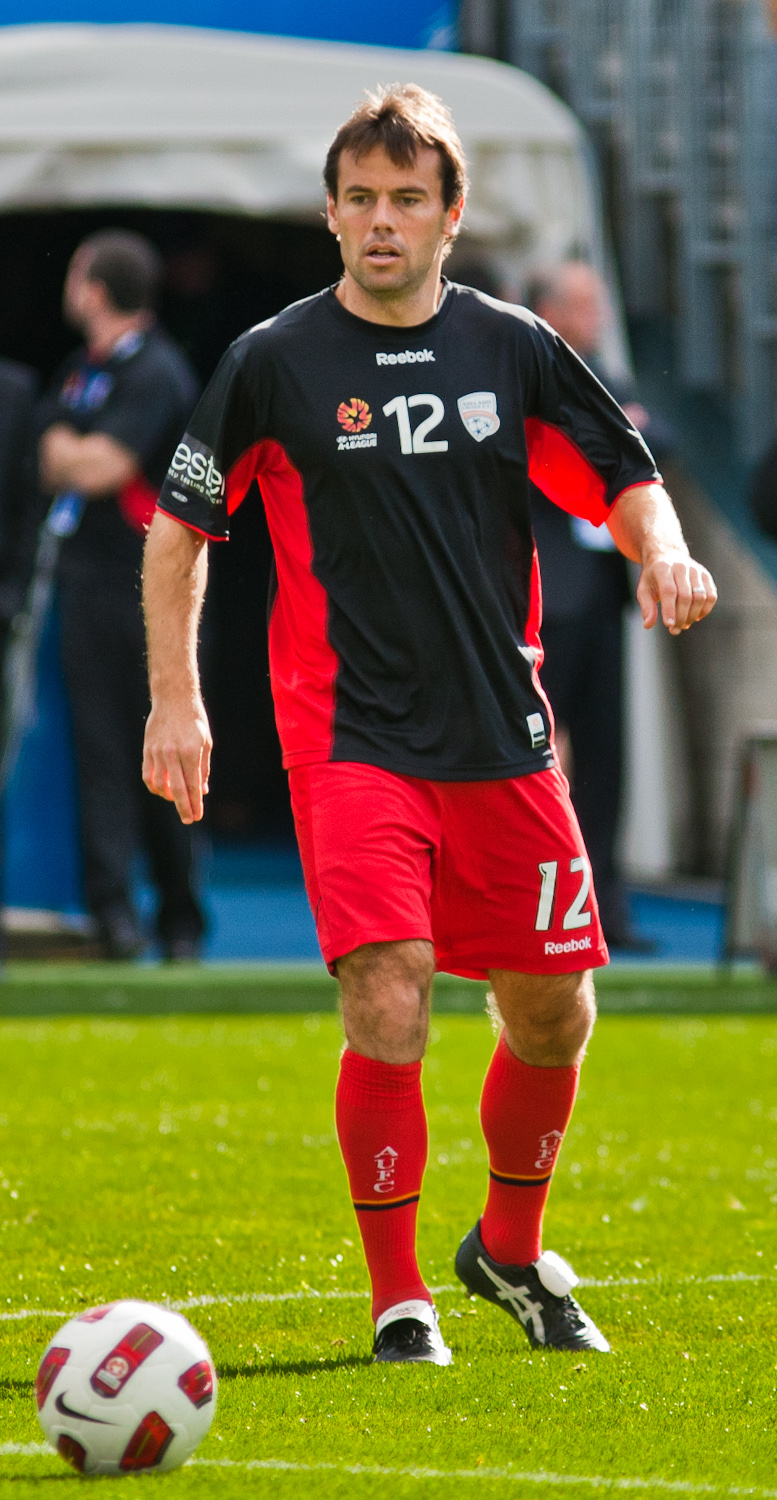
Paul Reid moved for free from Australian club Wollongong Wolves to Bradford City.

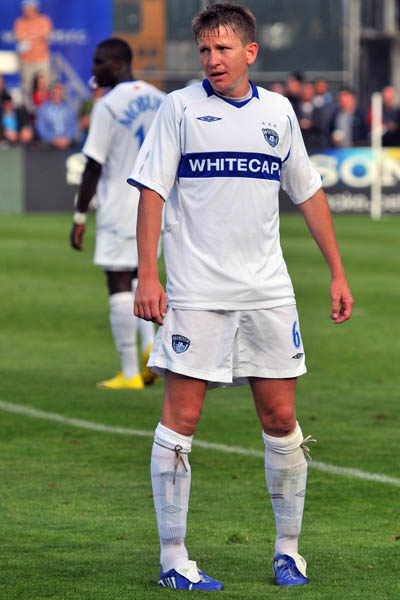
Canadian international Terry Dunfield signed for Bury on a free-transfer from Manchester City.

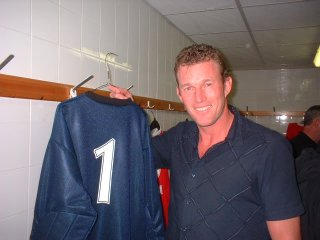
Goalkeeper Dave Beasant made three separate transfers in this period. He transferred from Portsmouth to Bradford City, was signed by Wigan Athletic, and then moved to Brighton & Hove Albion.

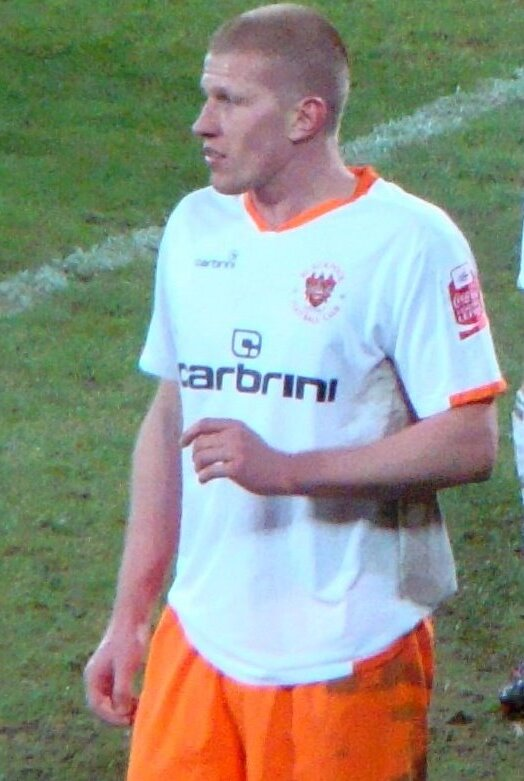
Keith Southern made the move from Everton to Blackpool for an undisclosed fee.

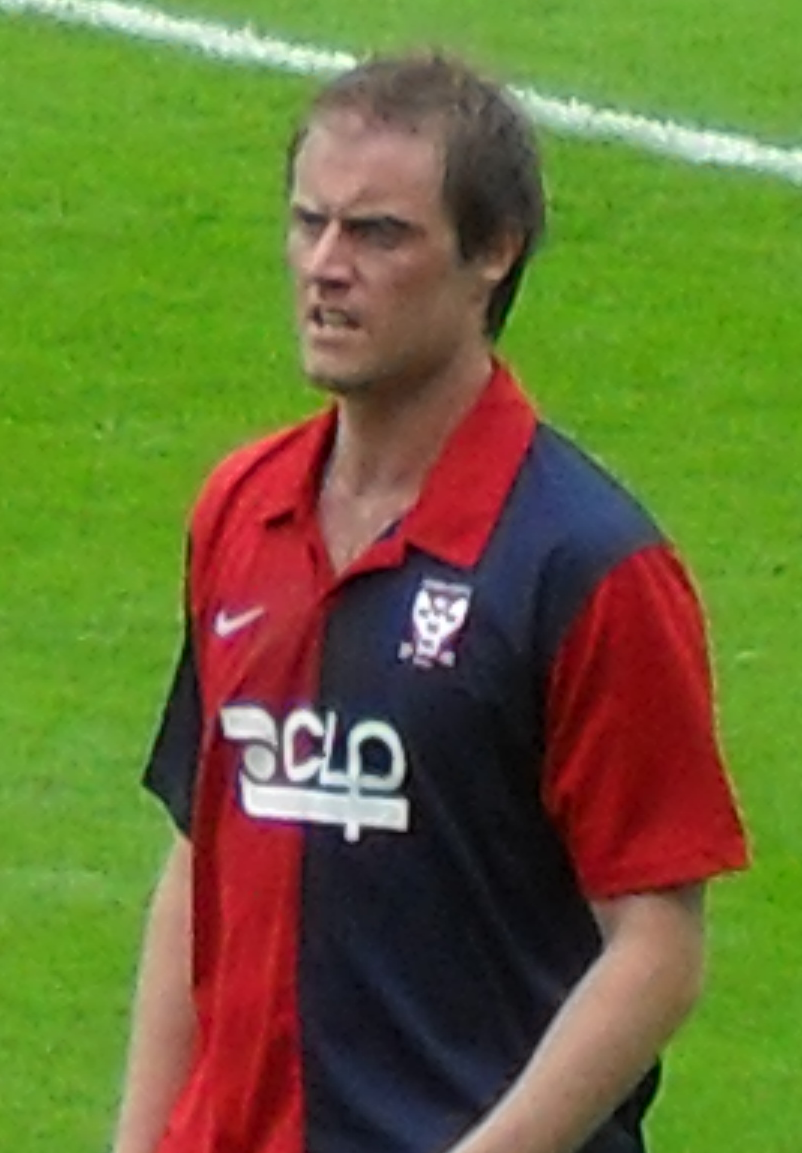
Alan O'Hare made the switch from Bolton Wanderers to Chesterfield on a free transfer.

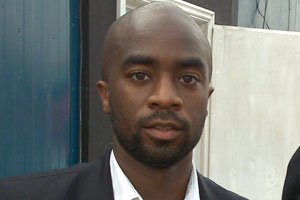
Jay Smith moved from Aston Villa's youth team to Southend United.

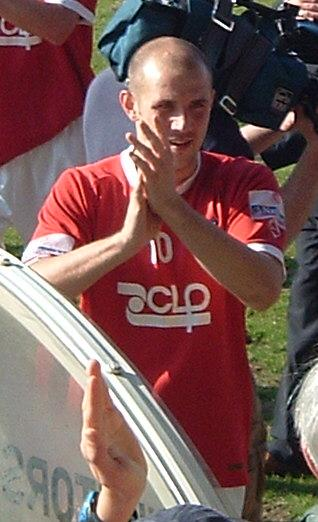
Craig Farrell was a £50k signing for Carlisle United from Leeds United.

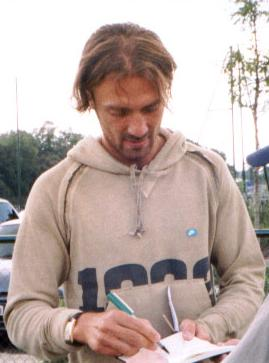
Christophe Dugarry signed for Birmingham City in January from Bordeaux on loan. He made his move permanent in the summer.

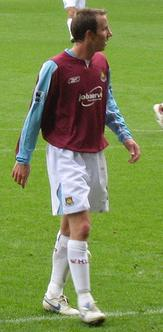
Lee Bowyer left Leeds United to move to relegation-threatened West Ham United for only £100k.

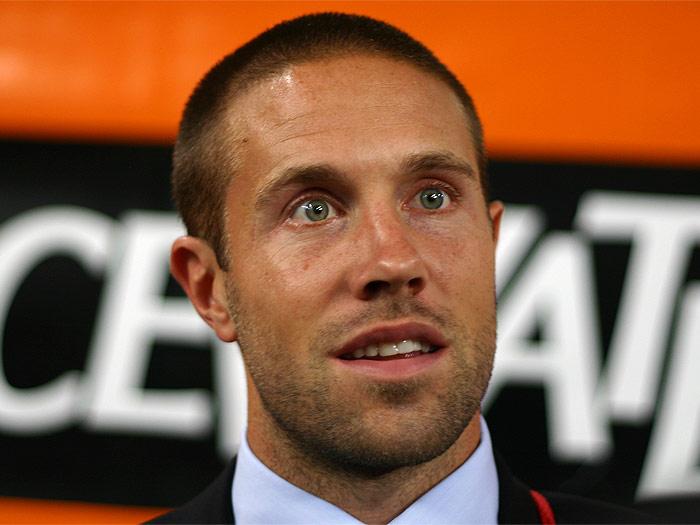
Matthew Upson signed for Birmingham City from Arsenal for £3m. He also had a loan spell at Reading in September 2002.

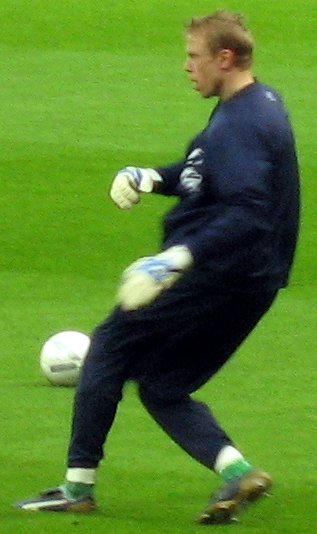
Estonian goalkeeper Mart Poom moved from Derby County to Sunderland for £2.5m.

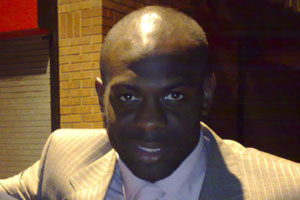
Michael Ricketts moved from Bolton Wanderers to Middlesbrough in January 2003.

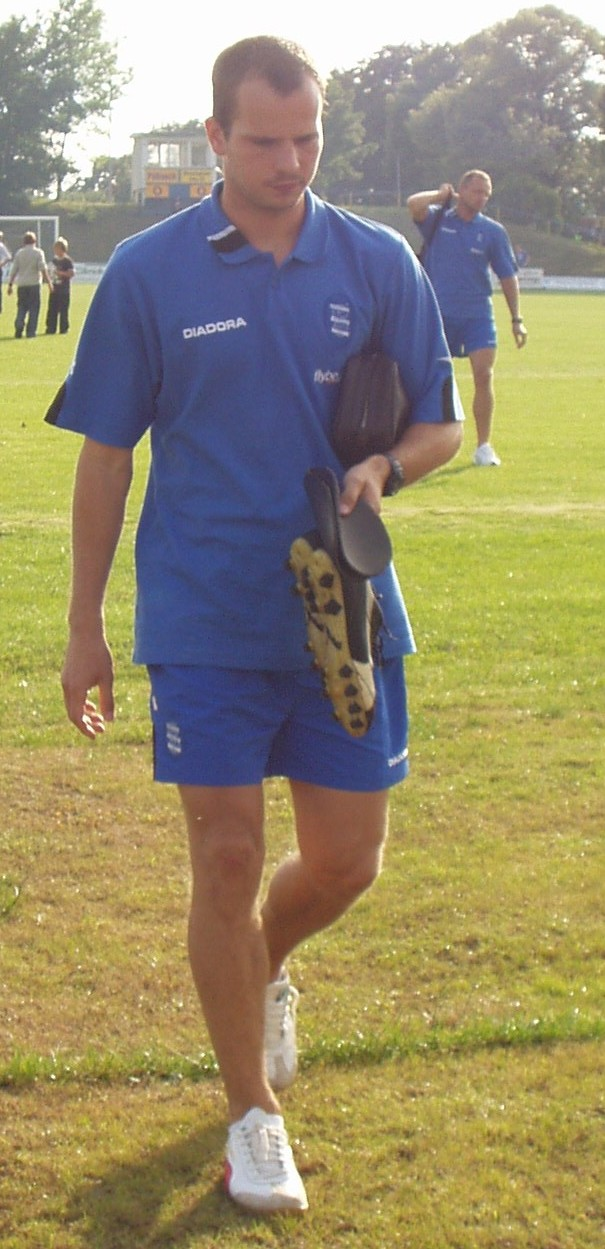
Tottenham Hotspur midfielder Stephen Clemence transferred to Birmingham City for £900k.

Date	Name	Moving from	Moving to	Fee
4 September 2002	Phil Jevons	Grimsby Town	Hull City	Loan
4 September 2002	(United States) Eddie Lewis	Fulham	Preston North End	Undisclosed
5 September 2002	Marlon Beresford	York City	Burnley	Free
5 September 2002	Paul Furlong	Birmingham City	Queens Park Rangers	Free
5 September 2002	(Sweden) Håkan Mild	Wimbledon	(Sweden) IFK Göteborg	Undisclosed
5 September 2002	Matthew Upson	Arsenal	Reading	Loan
6 September 2002	(Republic of Ireland) Damien Delaney	Leicester City	Mansfield Town	Loan
6 September 2002	(Denmark) Kasper Schmeichel	Unattached	Manchester City	Free
6 September 2002	(Israel) Idan Tal	Everton	(Spain) Rayo Vallecano	Free
6 September 2002	Adi Viveash	Reading	Oxford United	Loan
10 September 2002	Wayne Burnett	Grimsby Town	Woking	Free
10 September 2002	(Australia) Paul Reid	(Australia) Wollongong Wolves	Bradford City	Free
10 September 2002	(Australia) Tony Vidmar	(Scotland) Rangers	Middlesbrough	Free
11 September 2002	Niall Hudson	Nottingham Forest	Halifax Town	Undisclosed
12 September 2002	Mark Clyde	Wolverhampton Wanderers	Kidderminster Harriers	Loan
12 September 2002	John Melligan	Wolverhampton Wanderers	Kidderminster Harriers	Loan
12 September 2002	Stephen Warnock	Liverpool	Bradford City	Loan
13 September 2002	Kevin Davies	Southampton	Millwall	Loan
13 September 2002	(South Africa) Justin Miller	Leyton Orient	Ipswich Town	Loan
13 September 2002	Tommy Mooney	Birmingham City	Stoke City	Loan
13 September 2002	Neil Moss	Southampton	Bournemouth	Loan
13 September 2002	(Jamaica) Darryl Powell	Derby County	Birmingham City	Free
16 September 2002	(Turkey) Erdem Artun	Ipswich Town	Doncaster Rovers	Loan
17 September 2002	(Wales) Chris Edwards	Nottingham Forest	Tranmere Rovers	Loan
17 September 2002	(Republic of Ireland) David Freeman	Nottingham Forest	Carlisle United	Loan
17 September 2002	Mark Hudson	Middlesbrough	Chesterfield	Loan
18 September 2002	(United States) Ian Feuer	Wimbledon	Wolverhampton Wanderers	Free
20 September 2002	Nicky Eaden	Birmingham City	Wigan Athletic	Loan
20 September 2002	Scott Hiley	Portsmouth	Exeter City	Loan
20 September 2002	Graham Hyde	Birmingham City	Peterborough United	Loan
20 September 2002	John Piercy	Tottenham Hotspur	Brighton & Hove Albion	Free
23 September 2002	Sean Doherty	Fulham	Blackpool	Loan
23 September 2002	Mark Hudson	Fulham	Oldham Athletic	Loan
24 September 2002	Dennis Wise	Leicester City	Millwall	Free
26 September 2002	David Artell	Rotherham United	Shrewsbury Town	Loan
26 September 2002	Alan O'Hare	Bolton Wanderers	Chesterfield	Loan
26 September 2002	Nicky Southall	Bolton Wanderers	Norwich City	Loan
27 September 2002	Dave Beasant	Portsmouth	Bradford City	Free
27 September 2002	Michael Boulding	Aston Villa	Sheffield United	Loan
27 September 2002	Gary Jones	Nottingham Forest	Tranmere Rovers	Loan
27 September 2002	(Republic of Ireland) Ritchie Partridge	Liverpool	Coventry City	Loan
27 September 2002	(Cape Verde) Georges Santos	Sheffield United	Grimsby Town	Free
27 September 2002	Phil Whitehead	Reading	Tranmere Rovers	Loan
28 September 2002	(Greece) Nikolaos Michopoulos	Burnley	Crystal Palace	Loan
30 September 2002	Matthew Parry	Liverpool	Northwich Victoria	Loan
30 September 2002	Michael Taylor	Blackburn Rovers	Carlisle United	Loan
30 September 2002	Paul Teather	Manchester United	Northwich Victoria	Loan
2 October 2002	Lee Cook	Watford	York City	Loan
3 October 2002	(Ivory Coast) Lassina Diabaté	(France) Auxerre	Portsmouth	Free
4 October 2002	Michael Branch	Wolverhampton Wanderers	Hull City	Loan
4 October 2002	Craig Farrell	Leeds United	Carlisle United	Loan
4 October 2002	(Northern Ireland) Grant McCann	West Ham United	Cheltenham Town	Loan
4 October 2002	Leon Osman	Everton	Carlisle United	Loan
4 October 2002	John Sutton	Tottenham Hotspur	Carlisle United	Loan
7 October 2002	Louis Riddle	West Ham United	Stevenage Borough	Free
9 October 2002	Colin Cryan	Sheffield United	Scarborough	Loan
9 October 2002	David Norris	Bolton Wanderers	Plymouth Argyle	Loan
10 October 2002	Kenny Coleman	Wolverhampton Wanderers	Kidderminster Harriers	Loan
11 October 2002	Sean Connelly	Wolverhampton Wanderers	Tranmere Rovers	Free
11 October 2002	Lee Featherstone	Sheffield United	Scunthorpe United	Loan
11 October 2002	Gavin Kelly	Tottenham Hotspur	Kettering Town	Loan
11 October 2002	Alex Mortimer	Leicester City	Shrewsbury Town	Loan
11 October 2002	Ben Muirhead	Manchester United	Doncaster Rovers	Loan
13 October 2002	Liam Ridgewell	Aston Villa	Bournemouth	Loan
14 October 2002	Simon Royce	Leicester City	Queens Park Rangers	Loan
16 October 2002	Brian Cash	Nottingham Forest	Swansea City	Loan
16 October 2002	(Republic of Ireland) Paddy Kenny	Bury	Sheffield United	Undisclosed
16 October 2002	David Lee	Brighton & Hove Albion	Bristol Rovers	Loan
17 October 2002	(Republic of Ireland) Damien Delaney	Leicester City	Hull City	£50k
17 October 2002	Danny Hudson	Rotherham United	Doncaster Rovers	Loan
17 October 2002	Glen Johnson	West Ham United	Millwall	Loan
17 October 2002	(Northern Ireland) Jeff Whitley	Manchester City	Notts County	Loan
18 October 2002	Chukki Eribenne	Bournemouth	Hereford United	Loan
18 October 2002	Tyrone Thompson	Sheffield United	Lincoln City	Loan
18 October 2002	Adi Viveash	Reading	Oxford United	Loan
21 October 2002	Dean Blackwell	Wimbledon	Brighton & Hove Albion	Loan
21 October 2002	Lewis Buxton	Portsmouth	Exeter City	Loan
21 October 2002	Nicky Eaden	Birmingham City	Wigan Athletic	Free
21 October 2002	Carl Pettefer	Portsmouth	Exeter City	Loan
21 October 2002	Simon Rodger	Crystal Palace	Brighton & Hove Albion	Loan
22 October 2002	Izzy Iriekpen	West Ham United	Leyton Orient	Loan
24 October 2002	Brian Kerr	Newcastle United	Coventry City	Loan
24 October 2002	(Republic of Ireland) Ritchie Partridge	Liverpool	Coventry City	Loan
24 October 2002	Steve Stone	Aston Villa	Portsmouth	Loan
25 October 2002	Colin Little	Crewe Alexandra	Mansfield Town	Loan
25 October 2002	Andy White	Mansfield Town	Crewe Alexandra	Loan
26 October 2002	Dave Beasant	Bradford City	Wigan Athletic	Free
26 October 2002	Des Byrne	Wimbledon	Carlisle United	Loan
26 October 2002	Adam Proudlock	Wolverhampton Wanderers	Tranmere Rovers	Loan
26 October 2002	Tony Vaughan	Nottingham Forest	Mansfield Town	Loan
28 October 2002	Andy Frampton	Crystal Palace	Brentford	Free
29 October 2002	(Northern Ireland) Alan Blayney	Southampton	Stockport County	Loan
29 October 2002	Lee Cook	Watford	York City	Loan
31 October 2002	Brian Barry-Murphy	Preston North End	Hartlepool United	Loan
31 October 2002	Jon Harley	Fulham	Sheffield United	Loan
31 October 2002	(Wales) John Oster	Sunderland	Grimsby Town	Loan
1 November 2002	Jason Gavin	Middlesbrough	Grimsby Town	Loan
1 November 2002	Craig Hignett	Blackburn Rovers	Coventry City	Loan
1 November 2002	David Holdsworth	Bolton Wanderers	Scarborough	Loan
1 November 2002	Michael Reddy	Sunderland	York City	Loan
2 November 2002	Lee Barnard	Tottenham Hotspur	Exeter City	Loan
2 November 2002	George Pilkington	Everton	Exeter City	Loan
4 November 2002	Danny Hudson	Rotherham United	Doncaster Rovers	Loan
6 November 2002	Darren Dunning	Blackburn Rovers	Torquay United	Loan
7 November 2002	(Scotland) Duncan Jupp	Wimbledon	Notts County	Loan
6 November 2002	(Australia) Danny Milosevic	Leeds United	Plymouth Argyle	Loan
7 November 2002	Tony Butler	West Bromwich Albion	Bristol City	Free
7 November 2002	Gavin Melaugh	Aston Villa	Rochdale	Loan
7 November 2002	Sean Thornton	Sunderland	Blackpool	Loan
7 November 2002	Lee Thompson	Sheffield United	Boston United	Free
7 November 2002	Calum Willock	Fulham	Queens Park Rangers	Loan
8 November 2002	Jonathan Ashton	Leicester City	Notts County	Loan
8 November 2002	(Australia) Shane Cansdell-Sherriff	Leeds United	Rochdale	Loan
8 November 2002	(Grenada) Delroy Facey	Bolton Wanderers	Bradford City	Loan
8 November 2002	Matthew Gadsby	Walsall	Mansfield Town	Free
8 November 2002	Dominique Krief	Leeds United	Sheffield Wednesday	Loan
8 November 2002	Harpal Singh	Leeds United	Bradford City	Loan
8 November 2002	Keith Southern	Everton	Blackpool	Undisclosed
8 November 2002	Paul Tierney	Manchester United	Crewe Alexandra	Loan
8 November 2002	Daniel Webb	Southend United	Brighton & Hove Albion	Loan
11 November 2002	Jerry Gill	Birmingham City	Northampton Town	Free
11 November 2002	Ben Muirhead	Manchester United	Doncaster Rovers	Loan
11 November 2002	Alan O'Hare	Bolton Wanderers	Chesterfield	Free
14 November 2002	(France) Ludovic Pollet	Wolverhampton Wanderers	Walsall	Loan
14 November 2002	Dean Windass	Middlesbrough	Sheffield United	Loan
15 November 2002	Steve Kabba	Crystal Palace	Sheffield United	£250k
15 November 2002	Jermaine Pennant	Arsenal	Watford	Loan
15 November 2002	(Estonia) Mart Poom	Derby County	Sunderland	Loan
16 November 2002	Paul Gerrard	Everton	Ipswich Town	Loan
18 November 2002	Andy Bishop	Walsall	Kidderminster Harriers	Loan
20 November 2002	Tony Barras	Walsall	Plymouth Argyle	Loan
20 November 2002	(Australia) Jamie McMaster	Leeds United	Coventry City	Loan
20 November 2002	Steve Melton	Brighton & Hove Albion	Hull City	Loan
20 November 2002	Jay Smith	Aston Villa	Southend United	Free
21 November 2002	(Republic of Ireland) Cliff Byrne	Sunderland	Scunthorpe United	Loan
21 November 2002	Lewis Killeen	Sheffield United	Halifax Town	Loan
21 November 2002	Brian McGovern	Norwich City	Peterborough United	Free
21 November 2002	(Wales) Boaz Myhill	Aston Villa	Bradford City	Loan
22 November 2002	Craig Farrell	Leeds United	Carlisle United	£50k
22 November 2002	(Northern Ireland) Michael Ingham	Sunderland	Darlington	Loan
22 November 2002	(Republic of Ireland) Patrick McCarthy	Manchester City	Boston United	Loan
22 November 2002	Marc Richards	Blackburn Rovers	Swansea City	Loan
22 November 2002	Paul Robinson	Wimbledon	Carlisle United	Loan
22 November 2002	Alan Tate	Manchester City	Swansea City	Loan
27 November 2002	Ryan Green	Cardiff City	Sheffield Wednesday	Loan
27 November 2002	Graham Hyde	Birmingham City	Bristol Rovers	Free
27 November 2002	Shaun Wilkinson	Brighton & Hove Albion	Chesterfield	Loan
28 November 2002	Carlton Cole	Chelsea	Wolverhampton Wanderers	Loan
29 November 2002	Jimmy Aggrey	Fulham	Yeovil Town	Loan
29 November 2002	(Wales) Mark Crossley	Middlesbrough	Stoke City	Loan
29 November 2002	Rhys Day	Manchester City	Mansfield Town	Loan
29 November 2002	Phil Gulliver	Middlesbrough	Blackpool	Loan
29 November 2002	Dean Holdsworth	Bolton Wanderers	Coventry City	Loan
29 November 2002	Richard Logan	Ipswich Town	Boston United	Loan
29 November 2002	(Republic of Ireland) John McGrath	Aston Villa	Dagenham & Redbridge	Loan
29 November 2002	Richard Offiong	Newcastle United	Darlington	Loan
29 November 2002	Geoff Pitcher	Brighton & Hove Albion	Dagenham & Redbridge	Loan
29 November 2002	Marvin Robinson	Derby County	Tranmere Rovers	Loan
29 November 2002	Kevin Street	Crewe Alexandra	Bristol Rovers	Free
29 November 2002	Adam Virgo	Brighton & Hove Albion	Exeter City	Loan
29 November 2002	Ben Williams	Manchester United	Coventry City	Loan
3 December 2002	Brian Barry-Murphy	Preston North End	Hartlepool United	Loan
3 December 2002	Paul Hayes	Norwich City	Scunthorpe United	Free
3 December 2002	Gavin Melaugh	Aston Villa	Rochdale	Loan
3 December 2002	Glyn Thompson	Fulham	Northampton Town	Loan
1 November 2002	Jason Gavin	Middlesbrough	Grimsby Town	Loan
4 December 2002	(Wales) John Oster	Sunderland	Grimsby Town	Loan
27 September 2002	(Cape Verde) Georges Santos	Sheffield United	Grimsby Town	Free
4 December 2002	(Turkey) Hakan Şükür	(Italy) Parma	Blackburn Rovers	Free
5 December 2002	Gareth Ainsworth	Wimbledon	Walsall	Loan
5 December 2002	John Melligan	Wolverhampton Wanderers	Kidderminster Harriers	Loan
6 December 2002	Steve Banks	Bolton Wanderers	Stoke City	Loan
6 December 2002	(Republic of Ireland) Graham Barrett	Arsenal	Brighton & Hove Albion	Loan
6 December 2002	Marcus Hall	Southampton	Stoke City	Loan
6 December 2002	Steve Sidwell	Arsenal	Brighton & Hove Albion	Loan
6 December 2002	Nicky Southall	Bolton Wanderers	Gillingham	Loan
6 December 2002	(Senegal) Ferdinand Coly	(France) Lens	Birmingham City	Loan
9 December 2002	Chris Beech	Rotherham United	Doncaster Rovers	Free
9 December 2002	Paul Tierney	Manchester United	Crewe Alexandra	Loan
10 December 2002	Adam Eaton	Wimbledon	Mansfield Town	Loan
10 December 2002	Mark Hudson	Middlesbrough	Carlisle United	Loan
11 December 2002	(Slovakia) Vladimir Labant	West Ham United	(Czech Republic) Sparta Prague	Loan
12 December 2002	(Jamaica) Deon Burton	Derby County	Portsmouth	£250k
13 December 2002	Leon Britton	West Ham United	Swansea City	Loan
13 December 2002	Terry Dunfield	Manchester City	Bury	Free
13 December 2002	Allan Johnston	Middlesbrough	Sheffield Wednesday	Loan
13 December 2002	(Australia) Brad Jones	Middlesbrough	Stockport County	Loan
13 December 2002	Colin Little	Crewe Alexandra	Macclesfield Town	Loan
13 December 2002	Garry Monk	Southampton	Sheffield Wednesday	Loan
13 December 2002	Adam Proudlock	Wolverhampton Wanderers	Sheffield Wednesday	Loan
13 December 2002	Richard Rose	Gillingham	Bristol Rovers	Loan
13 December 2002	Alex Smith	Reading	Shrewsbury Town	Loan
13 December 2002	(Wales) Craig Stiens	Leeds United	Swansea City	Loan
18 December 2002	Wayne Brown	Ipswich Town	Watford	Free
18 December 2002	Lee Featherstone	Sheffield United	Scunthorpe United	Free
18 December 2002	Michael Jackson	Preston North End	Tranmere Rovers	Loan
19 December 2002	Steve Brown	Charlton Athletic	Reading	Free
19 December 2002	Lewis Killeen	Sheffield United	Halifax Town	Loan
19 December 2002	Daniel Martin	Brighton & Hove Albion	Southend United	Loan
20 December 2002	Andy Bishop	Walsall	Kidderminster Harriers	Loan
20 December 2002	Lee Cook	Watford	Queens Park Rangers	Loan
20 December 2002	Tom Curtis	Portsmouth	Mansfield Town	Free
20 December 2002	(Scotland) Colin Hendry	Bolton Wanderers	Blackpool	Loan
20 December 2002	Andy Lonergan	Preston North End	Darlington	Loan
20 December 2002	Leam Richardson	Bolton Wanderers	Blackpool	Loan
20 December 2002	Steve Stone	Aston Villa	Portsmouth	Free
23 December 2002	Andy Petterson	Brighton & Hove Albion	Bournemouth	Free
24 December 2002	(Norway) Espen Baardsen	Watford	Everton	Free
24 December 2002	(Northern Ireland) Alan Blayney	Southampton	Bournemouth	Loan
24 December 2002	Dean Marney	Tottenham Hotspur	Swindon Town	Loan
24 December 2002	Luke Nightingale	Portsmouth	Swindon Town	Loan
26 December 2002	Lee Bradbury	Portsmouth	Sheffield Wednesday	Loan
26 December 2002	Matt O'Halloran	Derby County	Burton Albion	Loan
28 December 2002	Sam Russell	Middlesbrough	Darlington	Loan
30 December 2002	Carlton Cole	Chelsea	Wolverhampton Wanderers	Loan
30 December 2002	Marvin Robinson	Derby County	Tranmere Rovers	Loan
30 December 2002	Ben Williams	Manchester United	Chesterfield	Loan
31 December 2002	(France) Cédric Berthelin	(France) Lens	Crystal Palace	Free
31 December 2002	Phil Gulliver	Middlesbrough	Carlisle United	Loan
31 December 2002	Dean Holdsworth	Bolton Wanderers	Coventry City	Free
31 December 2002	(Netherlands Antilles) Tyrone Loran	Manchester City	Tranmere Rovers	Loan
31 December 2002	(Finland) Daniel Sjölund	Liverpool	(Sweden) Djurgården	Loan
2 January 2003	(France) Christophe Dugarry	(France) Bordeaux	Birmingham City	Loan
2 January 2003	(United States) Brian McBride	(United States) Columbus Crew	Everton	Loan
2 January 2003	Leam Richardson	Bolton Wanderers	Blackpool	Loan
2 January 2003	(Egypt) Ibrahim Said	(Egypt) Al-Ahly	Everton	Loan
3 January 2003	(France) Djamel Belmadi	(France) Marseille	Manchester City	Loan
3 January 2003	Wayne Quinn	Newcastle United	Sheffield United	Loan
3 January 2003	Daryl Sutch	Norwich City	Southend United	Free
3 January 2003	(Greece) Efstathios Tavlaridis	Arsenal	Portsmouth	Loan
3 January 2003	(Scotland) Iain Turner	(Scotland) Stirling Albion	Everton	Free
6 January 2003	(Nigeria) Yakubu	(Israel) Maccabi Haifa	Portsmouth	Loan
6 January 2003	(Finland) Markus Heikkinen	(Finland) HJK	Portsmouth	Loan
7 January 2003	(Canada) Simon Lynch	(Scotland) Celtic	Preston North End	£130k
8 January 2003	(Argentina) Federico Arias	(Argentina) Vélez Sársfield	Southampton	Undisclosed
8 January 2003	Lee Bowyer	Leeds United	West Ham United	£100k
9 January 2003	(France) Olivier Dacourt	Leeds United	(Italy) Roma	Loan
9 January 2003	Neil Emblen	Norwich City	Walsall	Loan
10 January 2003	Michael Boulding	Aston Villa	Grimsby Town	Loan
10 January 2003	Lewis Buxton	Portsmouth	Bournemouth	Loan
10 January 2003	Stephen Clemence	Tottenham Hotspur	Birmingham City	£900k
10 January 2003	Jamie Clapham	Ipswich Town	Birmingham City	£1.3m
10 January 2003	(Guinea) Drissa Diallo	(Belgium) Mechelen	Burnley	Monthly
10 January 2003	(Scotland) Jonathan Gould	(Scotland) Celtic	Preston North End	Free
10 January 2003	(Estonia) Mart Poom	Derby County	Sunderland	£2.5m
10 January 2003	Frazer Richardson	Leeds United	Stoke City	Loan
10 January 2003	(Spain) Juan Sara	(Scotland) Dundee	Coventry City	Loan
12 January 2003	(France) Grégory Vignal	Liverpool	(France) Bastia	Loan
13 January 2003	Alex Smith	Reading	Shrewsbury Town	Loan
14 January 2003	(Republic of Ireland) Cliff Byrne	Sunderland	Scunthorpe United	Loan
13 January 2003	(France) Laurent Charvet	Manchester City	(France) Sochaux	Free^{[B]}
14 January 2003	(France) Laurent Courtois	West Ham United	(France) Istres	Free
14 January 2003	(Netherlands) Gerald Sibon	Sheffield Wednesday	(Netherlands) Heerenveen	Free
15 January 2003	Lewis Killeen	Sheffield United	Halifax Town	Loan
15 January 2003	Aaron Labonte	Newcastle United	(Scotland) Livingston	Loan
15 January 2003	(Jamaica) Darryl Powell	Birmingham City	Sheffield Wednesday	Free
15 January 2003	Tommy Smith	Newcastle United	Livingston	Loan
15 January 2003	Dean Windass	Middlesbrough	Sheffield United	Free
15 January 2003	(Norway) Bjørn Otto Bragstad	Derby County	(Austria) Bregenz	Free
16 January 2003	Keith Briggs	Stockport County	Norwich City	£65k
16 January 2003	Ben Doane	Sheffield United	Mansfield Town	Loan
16 January 2003	Darren Dunning	Blackburn Rovers	Macclesfield Town	Loan
16 January 2003	John Eustace	Coventry City	Middlesbrough	Loan
16 January 2003	Craig Fagan	Birmingham City	Bristol City	Loan
17 January 2003	Luke Cornwall	Fulham	Lincoln City	Loan
17 January 2003	(Wales) Christian Edwards	Nottingham Forest	Oxford United	Loan
17 January 2003	Paul Evans	Bradford City	Blackpool	Loan
17 January 2003	(France) Jean-Philippe Javary	Sheffield United	Walsall	Loan
17 January 2003	Lee Mills	Coventry City	Stoke City	Loan
17 January 2003	Tommy Mooney	Birmingham City	Sheffield United	Loan
17 January 2003	Ben Roberts	Charlton Athletic	Brighton & Hove Albion	Loan
17 January 2003	(Wales) Carl Robinson	Portsmouth	Sheffield Wednesday	Loan
17 January 2003	Dene Shields	Sunderland	Raith Rovers	Undisclosed
18 January 2003	Rhys Day	Manchester City	Mansfield Town	Free
20 January 2003	(Australia) Danny Milosevic	Leeds United	Crewe Alexandra	Free
20 January 2003	Steve Sidwell	Arsenal	Reading	Free
21 January 2003	Les Ferdinand	Tottenham Hotspur	West Ham United	Free
21 January 2003	Richard Logan	Ipswich Town	Boston United	Free
21 January 2003	(Republic of Ireland) Alan Mahon	Blackburn Rovers	Cardiff City	Loan
21 January 2003	(Poland) Piotr Świerczewski	(France) Marseille	Birmingham City	Loan
22 January 2003	(Wales) Boaz Myhill	Aston Villa	Stoke City	Loan
22 January 2003	Matthew Upson	Arsenal	Birmingham City	£3m
23 January 2003	(Guinea) Titi Camara	West Ham United	(Saudi Arabia) Al-Ittihad	Loan
23 January 2003	Richard Edghill	Wigan Athletic	Sheffield United	Loan
23 January 2003	(Wales) Gareth Williams	Crystal Palace	Colchester United	Loan
24 January 2003	(France) Benjamin Gavanon	(France) Marseille	Nottingham Forest	Loan
24 January 2003	Ian Hendon	Sheffield Wednesday	Peterborough United	Undisclosed
24 January 2003	(Northern Ireland) Michael Ingham	Sunderland	York City	Loan
24 January 2003	(Greece) George Koumantarakis	(Switzerland) Basel	Preston North End	Undisclosed
24 January 2003	(Finland) Teuvo Moilanen	Preston North End	(Scotland) Hearts	Loan
24 January 2003	(France) David Sommeil	(France) Bordeaux	Manchester City	£3.5m
24 January 2003	Adrian Whitbread	Reading	Exeter City	Loan
24 January 2003	Curtis Woodhouse	Birmingham City	Rotherham United	Loan
24 January 2003	(Portugal) Abel Xavier	Liverpool	(Turkey) Galatasaray	Loan
27 January 2003	(Iceland) Joey Guðjónsson	(Spain) Real Betis	Aston Villa	Loan
27 January 2003	David Rowson	Stoke City	(Scotland) Partick Thistle	Undisclosed
28 January 2003	(Scotland) Andy Tod	Bradford City	(Scotland) Dundee United	Loan
29 January 2003	Jerel Ifil	Watford	Swindon Town	Loan
29 January 2003	(Northern Ireland) Grant McCann	West Ham United	Chesterfield	£50k
29 January 2003	(Belgium) Davy Oyen	(Belgium) Anderlecht	Nottingham Forest	Free
29 January 2003	(Ukraine) Serhii Rebrov	Tottenham Hotspur	(Turkey) Fenerbahçe	Loan
30 January 2003	(Spain) Salva Ballesta	(Spain) Valencia	Bolton Wanderers	Loan
30 January 2003	(Finland) Mikael Forssell	Chelsea	Borussia Mönchengladbach	Loan
30 January 2003	Robbie Fowler	Leeds United	Manchester City	£6m
30 January 2003	(Northern Ireland) David Healy	Preston North End	Norwich City	Loan
30 January 2003	(Republic of Ireland) Stephen Kelly	Tottenham Hotspur	Southend United	Loan
30 January 2003	Adrian Littlejohn	Sheffield United	Bradford City	Non-contract^{[C]}
30 January 2003	(Republic of Ireland) Brian Murphy	Manchester City	Oldham Athletic	Loan
30 January 2003	Michael Reddy	Sunderland	Sheffield United	Loan
30 January 2003	Tim Sherwood	Tottenham Hotspur	Portsmouth	Free
31 January 2003	(France) Pierre-Yves André	(France) Nantes	Bolton Wanderers	Loan
31 January 2003	Brian Barry-Murphy	Preston North End	Sheffield Wednesday	Undisclosed
31 January 2003	Dave Beasant	Wigan Athletic	Brighton & Hove Albion	Free
31 January 2003	(Spain) Raúl Bravo	(Spain) Real Madrid	Leeds United	Loan
31 January 2003	Rufus Brevett	Fulham	West Ham United	Free
31 January 2003	(Scotland) Mark Burchill	Portsmouth	(Scotland) Dundee	Free
31 January 2003	Tony Caig	(Scotland) Hibernian	Newcastle United	Free
31 January 2003	Malcolm Christie	Derby County	Middlesbrough	£3m^{[A]}
31 January 2003	Warren Cummings	Chelsea	Bournemouth	Loan
31 January 2003	(Netherlands) Wilko de Vogt	Sheffield United	(Netherlands) Roosendaal	Free
31 January 2003	(Morocco) Talal El Karkouri	(France) Paris Saint-Germain	Sunderland	Loan
31 January 2003	Tom English	Newcastle United	(Scotland) Livingston	Free
31 January 2003	(France) David Grondin	Arsenal	Dunfermline Athletic	Loan
31 January 2003	Danny Higginbotham	Derby County	Southampton	£1.5m
31 January 2003	(Scotland) Duncan Jupp	Wimbledon	Notts County	Free
31 January 2003	(France) Florent Laville	(France) Lyon	Bolton Wanderers	Loan
31 January 2003	(Sweden) Kangana Ndiwa	(Sweden) Djurgården	Bolton Wanderers	Undisclosed
31 January 2003	Stefan Magnusson	Unattached	Bradford City	Free
31 January 2003	Carlos Marinelli	Middlesbrough	Torino	Loan
31 January 2003	Justin Miller	Ipswich Town	Leyton Orient	Free
31 January 2003	Stuart Naylor	Fulham	St Johnstone	Undisclosed
31 January 2003	Richard Offiong	Newcastle United	Motherwell	Free
31 January 2003	Craig Penman	Everton	East Stirlingshire	Undisclosed
31 January 2003	David Prutton	Nottingham Forest	Southampton	£2.5m
31 January 2003	Chris Riggott	Derby County	Middlesbrough	Loan^{[A]}
31 January 2003	Michael Ricketts	Bolton Wanderers	Middlesbrough	£3.5m
31 January 2003	Anthony Shandran	Burnley	York City	Loan
31 January 2003	Tony Vaughan	Nottingham Forest	Motherwell	Loan
31 January 2003	Moritz Volz	Arsenal	Wimbledon	Loan
31 January 2003	Guillaume Warmuz	Lens	Arsenal	Loan
31 January 2003	Chris Willmott	Wimbledon	Luton Town	Loan
31 January 2003	Jonathan Woodgate	Leeds United	Newcastle United	£9m

== Notes ==
- ^{A} Christie and Riggott joined Middlesbrough in a combined deal worth £5 million. Christie signed for Middlesbrough immediately, while Riggott initially joined on loan before making a permanent move.
- ^{B} Charvet left Manchester City by mutual consent in October 2002. He signed for Sochaux in January.
