= 2004–05 Scunthorpe United F.C. season =

Scunthorpe United
2004–05 season
- Manager: Brian Laws
- Stadium: Glanford Park
- Football League Two: 2nd
- FA Cup: Third Round
- League Cup: First Round
- League Trophy: First Round

The 2004–05 season saw Scunthorpe United compete in Football League Two where they finished in 2nd position with 80 points, gaining automatic promotion to League One.

== Final league table ==
Pos	Team	Pld	W	D	L	GF	GA	GD	Pts	Promotion or relegation
1	Yeovil Town (C, P)	46	25	8	13	90	65	+25	83	Promotion to League One
2	Scunthorpe United (P)	46	22	14	10	69	42	+27	80	Promotion to League One
3	Swansea City (P)	46	24	8	14	62	43	+19	80	Promotion to League One
4	Southend United (O, P)	46	22	12	12	65	46	+19	78	Qualification for League Two play-offs
5	Macclesfield Town	46	22	9	15	60	49	+11	75	Qualification for League Two play-offs

Updated to match(es) played on 15 September 2009. Source: 2004–05 League Two
Rules for classification: 1) points; 2) goal difference; 3) number of goals scored.
(C) Champions; (O) Play-off winners; (P) Promoted

== Results ==
Scunthorpe United's score comes first

=== Legend ===
Win	Draw	Loss

=== Football League Two ===
Match	Date	Opponent	Venue	Result	Attendance	Scorers
1	7 August 2004	Rochdale	H	3–1	4,409	Taylor, Hayes, Sparrow
2	10 August 2004	Cheltenham Town	A	2–0	3,647	Kell, Keogh
3	14 August 2004	Oxford United	A	1–1	4,920	Hayes
4	21 August 2004	Lincoln City	H	3–2	5,212	Kell, Butler (2)
5	28 August 2004	Macclesfield Town	A	2–2	2,321	Sparrow, Hayes
6	30 August 2004	Northampton Town	H	2–0	4,201	Keogh, Crosby
7	4 September 2004	Darlington	A	0–0	3,983	
8	11 September 2004	Chester City	H	1–2	4,203	Butler
9	18 September 2004	Bury	A	1–0	2,846	Rankine
10	25 September 2004	Mansfield Town	H	1–1	5,463	Baraclough
11	2 October 2004	Boston United	A	1–2	3,640	Hayes
12	8 October 2004	Wycombe Wanderers	H	2–0	4,373	Hayes, Crosby
13	16 October 2004	Kidderminster Harriers	A	2–3	2,167	Hayes, Torpey
14	19 October 2004	Southend United	H	3–2	3,402	Hayes, Torpey, Crosby
15	23 October 2004	Yeovil Town	H	1–0	4,470	Butler
16	30 October 2004	Leyton Orient	A	1–1	4,359	Butler, Torpey
17	6 November 2004	Grimsby Town	H	2–0	8,054	Hayes (2)
18	20 November 2004	Bristol Rovers	A	3–0	7,039	Hayes (2), Torpey
19	27 November 2004	Shrewsbury Town	H	3–1	4,418	Hayes, Taylor, Beagrie
20	7 December 2004	Cambridge United	A	2–1	2,666	Torpey, Taylor
21	11 December 2004	Swansea City	H	1–0	5,075	Torpey
22	18 December 2004	Rushden & Diamonds	A	3–1	3,198	Torpey, Butler (2)
23	26 December 2004	Chester City	A	1–1	3,216	Torpey
24	28 December 2004	Notts County	H	0–0	6,399	
25	1 January 2005	Darlington	H	0–1	5,131	
26	3 January 2005	Mansfield Town	A	0–1	5,315	
27	15 January 2005	Bury	H	3–2	5,635	Torpey (2), Butler
28	22 January 2005	Notts County	A	0–2	6,429	
29	29 January 2005	Boston United	H	1–1	5,056	Butler
30	5 February 2005	Kidderminster Harriers	H	2–1	5,023	Hayes, Baraclough
31	11 February 2005	Southend United	A	0–0	8,224	
32	15 February 2005	Wycombe Wanderers	A	1–2	4,089	Sparrow
33	19 February 2005	Leyton Orient	H	1–0	5,162	Keogh
34	22 February 2005	Yeovil Town	A	3–4	7,598	Hayes (2), Butler
35	26 February 2005	Swansea City	A	1–2	7,249	Butler
36	5 March 2005	Rushden & Diamonds	H	1–0	4,932	Beagrie
37	12 March 2005	Cheltenham Town	H	4–1	4,659	Sparrow (2), Kell, Byrne
38	19 March 2005	Rochdale	A	0–0	3,605	
39	25 March 2005	Oxford United	H	1–1	5,977	Baraclough
40	28 March 2005	Lincoln City	A	0–2	6,729	
41	2 April 2005	Macclesfield Town	H	0–0	5,536	
42	9 April 2005	Northampton Town	A	2–1	6,523	Hayes, Kell
43	16 April 2005	Cambridge United	H	4–0	5,642	Kell, Crosby, Taylor
44	23 April 2005	Grimsby Town	A	0–0	7,941	
45	30 April 2005	Bristol Rovers	H	4–0	6,925	Torpey (2), Taylor, Hayes
46	7 May 2005	Shrewsbury Town	A	0–0	6,285	

=== FA Cup ===
Match	Date	Opponent	Venue	Result	Attendance	Scorers
R1	13 November 2004	Chesterfield	H	2–0	4,869	Hayes, Baraclough
R2	3 December 2004	Wrexham	H	2–0	5,668	Ridley, Sparrow
R3	8 January 2005	Chelsea	A	1–3	40,019	Hayes

=== Football League Cup ===
Match	Date	Opponent	Venue	Result	Attendance	Scorers
R1	25 August 2004	Nottingham Forest	A	0–2	7,344	

=== Football League Trophy ===
Match	Date	Opponent	Venue	Result	Attendance	Scorers
R1	28 September 2004	Hereford United	A	1 – 1 (3 – 4 pens)	1,414	Torpey

== Squad statistics ==
No.	Pos.	Name	League		FA Cup		League Cup		Other		Total	
No.	Pos.	Name	Apps	Goals	Apps	Goals	Apps	Goals	Apps	Goals	Apps	Goals
1	GK	(England) Tom Evans	0	0	0	0	0	0	1	0	1	0
2	DF	(England) Nathan Stanton	18(3)	0	0	1	0	1	0	0	20(3)	0
3	DF	(England) Kevin Sharp	4(2)	0	0(1)	0	0	0	0	0	4(3)	0
4	DF	(England) Andy Crosby	43(1)	4	3	0	1	0	0	0	47(1)	4
5	MF	(England) Wayne Corden	3(5)	0	0	0	0	0	0	0	3(5)	0
5	MF	(England) Mark Jackson	1(2)	0	0	0	0	0	1	0	2(2)	0
6	DF	(Republic of Ireland) Cliff Byrne	24(5)	1	3	0	0	0	1	0	28(5)	1
7	MF	(England) Matt Sparrow	35(9)	5	3	1	0(1)	0	1	0	39(10)	6
8	MF	(England) Wayne Graves	0	0	0	0	0	0	0(1)	0	0(1)	0
9	FW	(England) Paul Hayes	41(5)	17	3	2	1	0	0(1)	0	45(6)	19
10	FW	(England) Steve Torpey	33(1)	12	2	0	0	0	1	1	36(1)	13
11	DF	(England) Ian Baraclough	45	3	3	1	1	0	0	0	49	4
12	DF	(England) Lee Ridley	43(1)	0	3	1	1	0	0	0	47(1)	1
14	MF	(England) Peter Beagrie	36	2	3	0	1	0	0	0	40	2
15	FW	(Jamaica) Cleveland Taylor	18(26)	6	0(3)	0	1	0	1	0	20(29)	6
16	MF	(England) Terry Barwick	0	0	0	0	0	0	1	0	1	0
17	MF	(England) Andy Parton	0(1)	0	0	0	0(1)	0	0	0	0(2)	0
18	DF	(England) Andy Butler	36(1)	10	3	0	1	0	0	0	40(1)	10
19	MF	(England) Richard Kell	43	5	3	0	1	0	0	0	47	5
20	DF	(England) Richard Hinds	6(1)	0	0	0	0	0	0	0	6(1)	0
20	MF	(England) Lee Featherstone	0(1)	0	0	0	0	0	1	0	1(1)	0
22	DF	(Republic of Ireland) Richie Ryan	0	0	0	0	0	0	0	0	0	0
22	FW	(Republic of Ireland) Jonathan Walters	3	0	0	0	0	0	0	0	3	0
22	FW	(Northern Ireland) Neil Teggart	1	0	0	0	0	0	0	0	1	0
23	GK	(England) Paul Musselwhite	46	0	3	0	1	0	0	0	50	0
24	MF	(England) Russell Penn	0	0	0	0	0	0	0	0	0	0
25	DF	(England) Marcus Williams	0(4)	0	0(1)	0	0	0	0(1)	0	0(6)	0
26	GK	(England) Josh Lillis	0	0	0	0	0	0	0	0	0	0
26	FW	(England) Mat Bailey	2(2)	0	0	0	1	0	0	0	3(2)	0
27	FW	(Republic of Ireland) Andy Keogh	13(12)	3	0	0	0	0	0	0	13(12)	3
28	DF	(England) Stevland Angus	9	0	0	0	0	0	0	0	9	0
28	FW	(Scotland) Tom Brighton	2(3)	0	0	0	0	0	1	0	3(3)	0
29	FW	(England) Michael Rankine	1(20)	1	1(1)	0	0	0	1	0	3(21)	1
