= Stephen Hill (footballer, born 1982) =

English footballer

Personal information
- Full name: Stephen Bryan Hill
- Date of birth: 12 November 1982 (age 43)
- Place of birth: Prescot, England
- Height: 5 ft 10 in (1.78 m)
- Position: Left-back

Senior career*
Years	Team	Apps	(Gls)
2001–2004	Rochdale	11	(0)
2004	→ Morecambe (loan)	0	(0)
2004–2007	Radcliffe Borough	44	(4)
2007	Leigh RMI	?	(?)
2007–2009	Radcliffe Borough	?	(?)
Total		55	(4)
- * Club domestic league appearances and goals

Stephen Bryan Hill (born 12 November 1982 in Prescot, England) is an English professional footballer who played as a defender for Rochdale in the Football League.
