= Danny Chapman =

English footballer

Personal information
- Date of birth: 21 November 1974 (age 51)
- Place of birth: Deptford, England
- Height: 5 ft 10 in (1.78 m)
- Position: Midfielder

Senior career*
Years	Team	Apps	(Gls)
1993–1995	Millwall	12	(0)
1995–1997	Leyton Orient	78	(4)
1997–2000	Welling United	33	(0)
2000–2003	Dover Athletic	?	(?)
2003	Folkestone Invicta	?	(?)
2003–2004	Dover Athletic	?	(?)
2004–2005	Eastbourne Borough	26	(1)
2005–2007	Dover Athletic	?	(?)
2007–2009	Cray Wanderers	81	(3)
- * Club domestic league appearances and goals

Danny Chapman (born 21 November 1974) is a retired professional footballer who played in the football league with Millwall and Leyton Orient. Chapman played as a defensive central midfielder.

== Playing career ==
Chapman started at Millwall but failed to earn first-team football on a regular basis, which led to his move to Leyton Orient. At Orient Chapman did get first-team football for two years, making 78 league appearances for the club, but was released in the summer of 1997. He moved into non-league football with Conference club Welling United. Chapman spent three years at Welling, but he left to join fellow Conference side Dover Athletic after Welling were relegated from the Conference in 2000. Chapman left Dover in March 2003 to join rival Folkestone Invicta, however he returned to Dover in the summer of 2003. After one season he left to join Eastbourne Borough. He returned to Dover after one season, where he was a losing finalist in two consecutive Isthmian League Division One play-offs. Chapman left Dover to join fellow Isthmian League Division One South side Cray Wanderers. In his first season with the club, Chapman again lost in the play-offs. The following season it was fourth time lucky as Cray Wanderers were promoted after winning the Isthmian League Division One South play-off final. This was Chapman's final match as he retired after it.
