= Jimmy Benefield =

English footballer

Personal information
- Full name: James Patrick Benefield
- Date of birth: 6 May 1983 (age 43)
- Place of birth: Bristol, England
- Position: Midfielder

Team information
- Current team: Montegnée
- Number: 30

Youth career
- –2000: Torquay United

Senior career*
Years	Team	Apps	(Gls)
2000–2004	Torquay United	32	(0)
2004–2005	Bath City		
- Montegnée
- * Club domestic league appearances and goals

James Patrick Benefield (born 6 May 1983, in Bristol) is an English footballer who plays for Montegnée in Belgium.

Jimmy Benefield, a midfielder, joined Torquay United as an apprentice, turning professional in July 2000. His league debut came on 2 September, as a substitute for Kevin Hill in the 6–2 defeat to Brighton & Hove Albion at the Withdean Stadium. He had to wait 12 months for his next first team appearance, making sporadic appearances, mostly as a substitute for Roy McFarland's side. He remained with Torquay until May 2004 when he was released after Torquay's promotion to Football League One. Later that month he joined non-league side Bath City, along with Dean Stevens who had also been released by Torquay.

He was released by Bath the following May (2005). In August 2006 he appeared for Tooting & Mitcham's reserve side.

Benefield joined successful Sunday League side Lansdown F.C. in February 2007, making his debut in the 6–5 away defeat against South West Alliance. He went on to play 6 games for the club during the 2006–07 season.

It is thought that Benefield was lured to Lansdown F.C. by the presence of fellow Torquay United youth-team product Samuel Barnes.
