= Richard Kell (footballer) =

English footballer

Personal information
- Date of birth: 15 September 1979 (age 47)
- Place of birth: Bishop Auckland, England
- Position: Midfielder

Senior career*
Years	Team	Apps	(Gls)
1998–2001	Middlesbrough	0	(0)
2001	→ Torquay United (loan)	4	(1)
2001	Torquay United	11	(2)
2001–2005	Scunthorpe United	83	(8)
2005–2006	Barnsley	2	(0)
2006	→ Scarborough (loan)	2	(0)
2006–2007	Lincoln City	1	(0)
Total		103	(11)
- * Club domestic league appearances and goals

Richard Kell (born 15 September 1979) is an English former professional footballer who played as a midfielder.

Kell retired from football through injury, although he is starting to get back into football in a coaching capacity he pursued a career in aviation and became a commercial airline pilot.

== Career ==
Kell made 101 appearances in the Football League for Torquay United, Scunthorpe United, Barnsley and Lincoln City. In June 2005, he signed for Barnsley. He left Barnsley in 2006 and signed for Lincoln in December of that year. Kell left Lincoln City in 2007 as the club decided not to renew his contract.
