= David Nurse =

English footballer (born 1976)

Personal information
- Date of birth: 12 October 1976 (age 50)
- Place of birth: King's Lynn, England
- Position: Goalkeeper

Youth career
- 1995–1996: Manchester City

Senior career*
Years	Team	Apps	(Gls)
1996–1998	Millwall	0	(0)
1998	→ Brentford (loan)	0	(0)
1998	Barry Town	1	(0)
1998	York City	0	(0)
- * Club domestic league appearances and goals

David Nurse (born 12 October 1976) is an English former footballer who played as a goalkeeper.

== Career ==
Nurse was born in King's Lynn, Norfolk and started his footballing career at Manchester City in 1995. He left the club after making no first team appearances during the 1995–96 season to sign for Millwall. He made his Millwall debut in a 4–1 defeat at home to Wimbledon on 1 October 1997 in the Football League Cup second round. He joined Brentford on loan on 26 March 1998, but made no appearances for the team. Following a spell at Barry Town in Wales, where he played in Europe away to Dynamo Kiev, he joined York City in August 1998 on non-contract terms, but was unable to make an appearance.
