= Lee Duffy =

English footballer

Personal information
- Date of birth: 24 July 1982 (age 44)
- Place of birth: Oldham, England
- Position: Defender

Senior career*
Years	Team	Apps	(Gls)
1999–2004	Rochdale	34	(0)
2003	Rossendale United (loan)	10	(6)
2004	Halifax Town	0	(0)
2004–2007	Radcliffe Borough	135	(4)
2007–2011	Glenrothes	134	(43)
2011–2012	Bo'ness United	26	(4)
2012–2016	Dundonald Bluebell	109	(45)
2016–2017	St Andrews United	9	(0)
2017–2018	Oakley United	24	(10)
2018–	Inverkeithing Hillfield Swifts	14	(3)
Total		495	(115)

Managerial career
- Oct 2018–Sept 2019: Inverkeithing Hillfield Swifts
- * Club domestic league appearances and goals

Lee Duffy (born 24 July 1982) is an English former professional footballer who played as a defender for Rochdale in the Football League. His last contribution in football to date was player-manager at East of Scotland Football League club Inverkeithing Hillfield Swifts.
