= Mark Beard (footballer) =

English footballer (born 1974)

Personal information
- Date of birth: 8 October 1974 (age 52)
- Place of birth: Roehampton, London, England
- Positions: Right-back; midfielder

Team information
- Current team: Birmingham City W.F.C. (assistant head coach)

Youth career
- 1980–1988: Wimbledon
- 1988–1993: Millwall

Senior career*
Years	Team	Apps	(Gls)
1993–1995	Millwall	45	(2)
1995–1998	Sheffield United	38	(0)
1997	→ Southend United (loan)	9	(0)
1998–2000	Southend United	78	(1)
2000–2001	Kingstonian	23	(0)
2001–2003	Southend United	50	(0)
2003–2004	Kingstonian	35	(5)
2004–2006	San Pedro		
2006–2007	Stevenage Borough	39	(3)
2007	St Albans City	10	(2)
2007–2008	AFC Wimbledon	15	(1)
2008–2010	Haywards Heath Town		
2010–2011	Tooting & Mitcham United	5	(1)
Total		327	(15)

Managerial career
- 2009–2010: Haywards Heath Town
- 2010–2011: Tooting & Mitcham United
- 2015–2017: Loxwood
- 2023–2024: Eastbourne Borough
- * Club domestic league appearances and goals

Mark Beard (born 8 October 1974) is an English football manager and former professional footballer who is assistant head coach at Women's Super League club Birmingham City. He played primarily as a central midfielder, and was also utilised at right-back earlier in his career.

Beard spent time in the youth systems of Wimbledon and Millwall before making his senior debut for the latter in October 1993. He spent two seasons in the first team, during which he scored in an FA Cup victory away to Arsenal in January 1995. Ahead of the 1995–96 season, he signed for Sheffield United for £117,000, and in 1998 joined Southend United, having previously spent time at the club on loan. Named Southend's Player of the Year for the 1998–99 season, he made 151 appearances for the club across three spells. In 2004, Beard relocated to Spain to establish a youth academy for UD San Pedro, later joining the club's playing squad.

He returned to England in 2006 with Stevenage Borough, winning the FA Trophy as part of the first team to win a competitive cup final at the new Wembley Stadium in May 2007. He subsequently spent the 2007–08 season at AFC Wimbledon, helping the club achieve promotion to the Conference South via the play-offs. After retiring, Beard moved into management with non-League clubs Haywards Heath Town, Tooting & Mitcham United, and Loxwood, before working full-time in Brighton & Hove Albion's academy from 2017 to 2021. He was appointed manager of Eastbourne Borough in June 2023, departing in January 2024, and joined Hull City later that year. Beard joined Birmingham City Women as assistant head coach in August 2026.

== Early life ==
Beard was born in Roehampton, London. His family originates from South London, and he lived on the Aylesbury Estate growing up. He joined Wimbledon's youth academy at the age of six, and remained there until he was 14. He is a lifelong Millwall supporter.

== Playing career ==
=== Millwall ===
At the age of 14, Beard joined Millwall on trial, scoring a hat-trick for the under-14 team against Leyton Orient in his debut appearance. He subsequently signed schoolboy forms with the club and later progressed to a Youth Training Scheme contract at the age of 16. Initially deployed as a right winger, he was converted to right-back by youth coach Tom Walley. Beard captained the under-18 team in the FA Youth Cup, where they defeated a Manchester United team featuring David Beckham, Nicky Butt, Gary Neville, and Paul Scholes in the semi-final first leg at Old Trafford, before being eliminated 3–2 on aggregate. At youth level, he also helped the team win the Southern Junior Cup, as well as finish runners-up in the South East Counties league. He signed his first professional contract under manager Mick McCarthy in 1993.

Following injuries to first-team defenders, Beard was called up to the senior squad and made his debut aged 18 on 2 October 1993, starting in a 4–1 home victory over Watford. He made 15 appearances in all competitions that season, scoring his first senior goal in a 2–2 draw against Bristol City on 13 November 1993. Beard played regularly during the 1994–95 season, making 38 appearances in all competitions. He scored twice that season, including the opening goal in a 2–0 win over Arsenal in an FA Cup third-round replay at Highbury on 18 January 1995.

=== Sheffield United ===
In the final year of his contract at Millwall, Beard expressed a desire to remain at the club. He took part in pre-season ahead of the 1995–96 season, but was informed that Millwall had accepted an offer from First Division club Sheffield United. Identified as a transfer target by manager Dave Bassett, he joined the club on a three-year contract for a fee of £117,000. Beard made his debut as a substitute in a 2–0 defeat to Tranmere Rovers in August 1995. At the start of the 1997–98 season, after falling out of favour under new manager Nigel Spackman, he was loaned to Southend United for two months, making his first appearance in a 1–1 draw with Oldham Athletic, and playing ten matches during the loan. He returned to Sheffield United in January 1998, making four further appearances in the second half of the season. Beard left the club upon the expiry of his contract in June 1998.

=== Southend United and Kingstonian ===
After receiving offers from Brentford and Notts County, Beard rejoined Southend ahead of the 1998–99 season on a permanent basis, signing a two-year contract. He was a regular during his debut season, making 40 appearances in all competitions and being named the club's Player of the Year. The following season, he made 42 appearances as Southend finished 16th in Division Three, scoring his only goal for the club in a 2–1 defeat to Hull City in November 1999. In total, he made 82 appearances during his first spell with the club.

Beard joined Football Conference club Kingstonian on a free transfer on 12 July 2000. He made his debut in a 1–0 home victory over Northwich Victoria on 19 August 2000, and went on to play 35 times in a season that ended in relegation. Kingstonian reached the fourth round of the FA Cup that season, losing to Bristol City in a replay after a draw at Ashton Gate, with Beard featuring in both matches. He left at the end of the season and rejoined Southend United two months into the 2001–02 campaign, making 17 appearances.

He remained at Southend for the 2002–03 season, adding a further 42 appearances before departing in May 2003. Beard returned to Kingstonian for the 2003–04 season in the Isthmian League Premier Division, where he made 43 appearances in all competitions, scoring five goals. This included the only brace of his career in a 4–0 away victory against Maidenhead United on 19 August 2003. At the end of the season, while holidaying in Marbella, he interviewed for a role establishing a youth academy at UD San Pedro in Spain's Primera Andaluza. He coached across multiple age groups within the academy and also played for the club during his two years there.

=== Stevenage Borough ===
Beard signed for Conference National club Stevenage Borough on 11 September 2006. The move followed an approach by his brother, Matt Beard, to several managers in England. Manager Mark Stimson, a former teammate at Southend, invited him for a one-week trial before offering a contract, describing the need to add "grit" to the midfield. Beard initially played without pay and made his debut as a substitute in a 6–0 home victory over Stafford Rangers on 9 September 2006, the club's first win of the season. He scored his first goal ten days later in a 1–0 victory against Weymouth at Broadhall Way. Beard was a regular during the 2006–07 season, making 49 appearances in all competitions and scoring three goals. This included eight appearances in the FA Trophy, playing every minute in the club's run that season as Stevenage defeated Kidderminster Harriers 3–2 in the first competitive final at the new Wembley Stadium before a competition record crowd of 53,262. He was released at the end of the season, with Stimson opting to sign John Martin as his replacement; Beard later expressed disappointment at the decision.

=== Later career ===
Following his release from Stevenage, Beard joined Conference South club St Albans City as player-assistant manager on 20 June 2007. He worked under first-time manager Ritchie Hanlon, who described Beard as a trusted figure with the relevant coaching qualifications and experience to guide younger players. Beard scored twice in 10 appearances, but left the club after Hanlon's dismissal on 25 September 2007. He subsequently signed for Isthmian League Premier Division club AFC Wimbledon later in 2007, making 15 appearances and scoring once as the team secured promotion to the Conference South. He departed at the end of the season. Beard then spent two years at Haywards Heath Town in the Sussex County League, serving in a player-manager role during the 2009–10 season. He briefly returned to playing during the 2010–11 season while manager of Tooting & Mitcham United, making five appearances and scoring one goal following injuries to first-team players.

== Coaching career ==
=== Early coaching career ===
Beard gained initial coaching experience while playing at UD San Pedro in Spain and also coached in Cyprus. He obtained his UEFA B Licence in August 2007 and later earned his UEFA A Licence. In 2008, he established a youth academy at Sussex County League Division Three club Haywards Heath Town, while also managing the first team to a third-place finish during the 2009–10 season.

=== Tooting & Mitcham United ===
In July 2010, he was appointed manager of Isthmian League Premier Division club Tooting & Mitcham United. The move came about after his brother, Matt Beard, manager of Chelsea Ladies, contacted the club chairman to express Beard's interest in the vacant position; Chelsea Ladies played their home matches at Tooting & Mitcham's ground at the time. The club finished 14th in his first season in charge. Ahead of the 2011–12 season, the club altered its transfer strategy, leading to significant squad turnover; Beard used 40 players during the first four months of the season. He was dismissed on 6 December 2011 after a run of seven defeats in 10 league matches. Following his departure, Beard acknowledged that poor results and off-field issues at the club had contributed to the decision, as well as the high number of player changes during the season.

=== Academy roles ===
Beard was appointed youth team coach at League One club Crawley Town in February 2012, spending two years in the club's youth set-up. In 2014, he established the Love The Ball (LTB) Sussex Academy, which partnered with Southern Combination Premier Division club Loxwood ahead of the 2014–15 season to provide a pathway for academy players into senior football. After a year as head coach at the academy, he became manager of Loxwood's first team in 2015, with several academy players promoted to the senior squad during his tenure.

He combined his role at Loxwood with coaching Brighton & Hove Albion's under-15 and under-16 teams. In March 2017, Beard left Loxwood due to changes in his coaching responsibilities at Brighton, and two months later was promoted to under-18 academy coach. Under his management, Brighton's under-17 team won the Premier League Cup on 5 May 2021, defeating Middlesbrough 2–0 in the final.

=== Managerial and development roles ===
After four years as under-18 academy coach at Brighton, Beard was appointed assistant manager to Simon Rusk at National League club Stockport County on 6 July 2021. He left in October 2021, citing difficulties relocating away from his family. The following month, on 12 November 2021, he became head of coaching at National League South club Dorking Wanderers, a position he combined with a return to youth coaching at Brighton.

Beard was named manager of National League South club Eastbourne Borough on 8 June 2023. He oversaw the club's transition from part-time to full-time status before being dismissed on 1 January 2024 after six wins in 24 league matches. He was appointed professional development phase coach for the Hull City's under-18 team on 22 November 2024, working alongside David Meyler. During the 2025–26 season, Hull City under-18s reached the Professional Development League play-offs for the first time and set a new club record for points won, before losing to Charlton Athletic in the semi-final. Beard joined Birmingham City Women as assistant head coach on 6 August 2026, with his experience cited as a factor in his appointment.

== Style of play ==
Beard began his career as a right winger at Millwall before being converted to right-back by youth coach Tom Walley, who focused on developing his defensive skills through regular one-on-one drills. He was also deployed as a central midfielder, which became his primary position during the latter part of his career. A combative player, Beard was praised for his work ethic.

== Personal life ==
Beard's son, Sam, is also a footballer, and his younger brother, Matt, was a football manager who predominantly worked in women's football.

== Career statistics ==
Appearances and goals by club, season and competition
Club	Season	League			FA Cup		League Cup		Other		Total	
Club	Season	Division	Apps	Goals	Apps	Goals	Apps	Goals	Apps	Goals	Apps	Goals
Millwall	1993–94	First Division	14	1	0	0	1	0	—		15	1
Millwall	1994–95	First Division	31	1	4	1	3	0	—		38	2
Millwall	Total		45	2	4	0	4	0	0	0	53	3
Sheffield United	1995–96	First Division	Season statistics not known									
Sheffield United	1996–97	First Division	16	0	1	0	0	0	—		17	0
Sheffield United	1997–98	First Division	2	0	2	0	1	0	—		5	0
Sheffield United	Total		18	0	3	0	1	0	0	0	22	0
Southend United (loan)	1997–98	Second Division	9	0	—		—		1 (Note: Appearance(s) in Football League Trophy)	0	10	0
Southend United	1998–99	Third Division	37	0	1	0	1	0	1	0	40	0
Southend United	1999–2000	Third Division	41	1	1	0	0	0	0	0	42	1
Southend United	Total		78	1	2	0	1	0	1	0	82	1
Kingstonian	2000–01	Football Conference	23	0	6	0	—		6 (Note: One appearance in Conference Shield; three appearances in FA Trophy; one appearance in Surrey Senior Cup; one appearance in Bob Lord Challenge Trophy)	0	35	0
Southend United	2001–02	Third Division	14	0	1	0	0	0	2	0	17	0
Southend United	2002–03	Third Division	36	0	4	0	1	0	1	0	42	0
Southend United	Total		50	0	5	0	1	0	3	0	59	0
Kingstonian	2003–04	Isthmian League Premier Division	35	5	1	0	—		7 (Note: Two appearances in FA Trophy; three appearances in Surrey Senior Cup; two appearances in 2004 Isthmian League play-offs)	0	43	5
San Pedro	2004–05	Primera Andaluza	Season statistics not known									
San Pedro	2005–06	Regional Preferente de Andalucía	Season statistics not known									
Stevenage Borough	2006–07	Conference National	39	3	2	0	—		8 (Note: Appearances in FA Trophy)	0	49	3
St Albans City	2007–08	Conference South	10	2	—		—		0	0	10	2
AFC Wimbledon	2007–08	Isthmian League Premier Division	15	1	—		—		0	0	15	1
Haywards Heath Town	2008–09	Sussex County League Division Three	Season statistics not known									
Haywards Heath Town	2009–10	Sussex County League Division Three	Season statistics not known									
Tooting & Mitcham United	2010–11	Isthmian League Premier Division	5	1	0	0	—		0	0	5	1
Tooting & Mitcham United	2011–12	Isthmian League Premier Division	0	0	0	0	—		0	0	0	0
Tooting & Mitcham United	Total		5	1	0	0	0	0	0	0	5	1
Career total			327	15	23	1	7	0	26	0	383	16

== Honours ==
Millwall

- FA Youth Cup: 1990–91

Stevenage Borough

- FA Trophy: 2006–07

AFC Wimbledon

- Isthmian League Premier Division play-offs: 2007–08

Individual

- Southend United Player of the Year: 1998–99
