= Michael Taylor (English footballer) =

English footballer

Personal information
- Date of birth: 21 November 1982 (age 43)
- Place of birth: Liverpool, England
- Position: Defender

Youth career
- 2001–2002: Blackburn Rovers

Senior career*
Years	Team	Apps	(Gls)
2002–2004	Blackburn Rovers	0	(0)
2002	→ Carlisle United (loan)	10	(0)
2003	→ Rochdale (loan)	2	(0)
2004–2006	Cheltenham Town	23	(0)
2006	→ Forest Green Rovers (loan)	10	(0)
2006	Halifax Town	0	(0)
2006	Lancaster City	?	(?)
2006–2007	Hyde United	26	(0)
2007–2009	The New Saints	43	(0)
2009–2010	Fleetwood Town	24	(0)
2010	Hyde	13	(0)
2010–2012	Chester	53	(2)
2012	→ AFC Fylde (loan)	5	(0)
2012–2013	AFC Fylde	25	(0)
2013	Marine	1	(0)
- * Club domestic league appearances and goals

Michael Taylor (born 21 November 1982) is an English footballer who plays as a centre back.

== Career ==
Born in Liverpool, Taylor started his career with Blackburn Rovers. He was sent on loan to Carlisle United on 28 September 2002, and made his debut the same day in a 3–1 defeat away to Bournemouth. He made a total of 12 appearances for the Cumbrians in the 2002–03 season, before returning to Blackburn.

He spent time on loan with Rochdale, before moving to Cheltenham Town. Since then Taylor has played in non-League football for Forest Green Rovers, Halifax Town, Lancaster City, and Hyde United. He then moved to Welsh Premier League side The New Saints before joining Conference North side Fleetwood Town in January 2009. At the end of the 2008–09 season, Fleetwood Town manager, Micky Mellon praised Taylor for his contribution to the side.

On 9 July 2010 he signed again for Hyde after having a spell with them from 2006 to 2007. He made his second debut for the club in the club's 2010–11 opening league game on 14 August 2010 against AFC Telford United which Hyde lost 5–0. He made a total of 17 games scoring no goals in his second spell at Ewen Fields before leaving in December 2010.

On 29 December 2010, after leaving Hyde he joined newly reformed Chester in the Northern Premier League Division One North. He made his debut for Chester in a 2–2 home draw to Warrington Town.

In 2012, he went on loan to AFC Fylde and in November he joined the club permanently. In 2013, he left AFC Fylde and in October he joined Evo-stik Northern premier side Marine FC
