= Mike Harle =

English footballer

Personal information
- Date of birth: 31 October 1972 (age 54)
- Place of birth: Lewisham, London, England
- Position: Defender

Senior career*
Years	Team	Apps	(Gls)
1990–1991	Gillingham	3	(0)
1991–1993	Sittingbourne	52	(4)
1993–1997	Millwall	25	(1)
1995	→ Bury (loan)	1	(0)
1997–1999	Barnet	62	(2)
1999–2000	Welling United	24	(0)
Total		167	(7)
- * Club domestic league appearances and goals

Michael Harle (born 31 October 1972) is an English former footballer who played as a defender in the Football League. He was born in Lewisham, London.He retired aged 27 due to a foot injury.
