= Gavin Melaugh =

Northern Irish footballer

Gavin Melaugh PhD
- Scientific career
- Fields: Biophysics
- Workplaces: Queen's University Belfast, University of Edinburgh
Association football career
- Full name: Gavin Mark John Melaugh
- Date of birth: 9 July 1981 (age 45)
- Place of birth: Derry, Northern Ireland
- Position: Midfielder
Youth career
- –2002: Aston Villa
Senior career*
| Years | Team | Apps | (Gls) |
| 2002–2003 | Rochdale | 19 | (1) |
| 2003–2006 | Glentoran | | |
| 2006–2007 | Donegal Celtic | | |
| 2007–2009 | Ballymena United | 58 | (4) |
| 2009–2010 | Lisburn Distillery | | |
International career
| | Northern Ireland U21 | 11 | (1) |
- * Club domestic league appearances and goals

Gavin Melaugh (born 9 July 1981) is a Northern Irish physicist and former footballer.

== Academic career ==
Gavin Melaugh is a research fellow at the University of Edinburgh. His research studies biofilm formation and the collective behaviour of bacteria such as Pseudomonas, with applications to wastewater treatment.

== Football career ==
Melaugh played as a midfielder for Aston Villa's youth club and went on to play for several other football clubs.

=== Club Honours ===
Glentoran - Irish League 2004/05; Irish Cup 2003/04, Irish Cup Runner-Up 2005/06.
