= Wayne Graves =

English footballer

Personal information
- Full name: Wayne Alan Graves
- Date of birth: 18 September 1980 (age 46)
- Place of birth: Scunthorpe, England
- Height: 5 ft 7 in (1.70 m)
- Position: Right midfielder

Senior career*
Years	Team	Apps	(Gls)
1997–2005	Scunthorpe United	135	(6)
2005–2006	Kidderminster Harriers	5	(0)
Total		140	(6)
- * Club domestic league appearances and goals

Wayne Alan Graves (born 18 September 1980) is an English retired footballer who played as a right midfielder in the Football League for Scunthorpe United.
