= Lee Featherstone =

English footballer

Personal information
- Date of birth: 20 July 1983 (age 43)
- Place of birth: Chesterfield, England
- Position: Midfielder

Youth career
- Sheffield United

Senior career*
Years	Team	Apps	(Gls)
2002–2003	Sheffield United	0	(0)
2003–2005	Scunthorpe United	31	(0)
2005	→ Harrogate Town (loan)		
2005–2009	Alfreton Town		
2009–2013	Matlock Town		
- * Club domestic league appearances and goals

Lee Featherstone (born 20 July 1983) is a former professional footballer who played as a midfielder.

He played in the Football League for Scunthorpe United, as well as appearing at non-league level for Harrogate Town, Alfreton Town and Matlock Town.
