= Izzy Iriekpen =

English footballer (born 1982)

Personal information
- Full name: Ezomo Iriekpen
- Date of birth: 14 May 1982 (age 44)
- Place of birth: Newham, England
- Height: 6 ft 1 in (1.85 m)
- Position: Defender

Youth career
- –1998: West Ham United

Senior career*
| Years | Team | Apps | (Gls) |
| 1998–2003 | West Ham United | 0 | (0) |
| 2002 | → Leyton Orient (loan) | 5 | (1) |
| 2003 | → Cambridge United (loan) | 13 | (1) |
| 2003–2007 | Swansea City | 123 | (7) |
| 2007–2009 | Scunthorpe United | 33 | (5) |
| 2009 | Bristol City | 9 | (0) |
| 2009 | Hamilton Academical | 2 | (0) |
| Total | | 185 | (14) |

International career
| 1999 | England U19 | 3 | (2) |
- * Club domestic league appearances and goals

Ezomo "Izzy" Iriekpen (born 14 May 1982) is an English former footballer who played as a defender.

== Club career ==
=== West Ham United ===
Born in Newham, London, Iriekpen joined West Ham United as a trainee in August 1998. He captained their FA Youth Cup-winning team of 1999 that included the likes of Michael Carrick and Joe Cole. On 10 January 1999, Iriekpen was set to make his debut for West Ham, becoming the club's youngest ever player in the process, in a 4–1 defeat away to Manchester United, however, the referee blew the full time whistle before Iriekpen had a chance to enter the field of play.

After a knee injury, he joined East London neighbours Leyton Orient, managed by former Hammer Paul Brush on a six-week loan. On 22 October 2002, he made his professional debut in the first round of the season's Football League Trophy, at home to Peterborough United. In the 11th minute, he scored the first goal of a 3–2 victory. Four days later, he played his first game in The Football League, a 2–1 win away to Bristol Rovers in the Third Division; on 29 October he scored his first league goal in the second minute of a win by the same score against local rivals Southend United at Brisbane Road.

He returned to the same league on loan at Cambridge United in March 2003, playing 13 games and scoring to open a 3–1 loss away to York City on 8 March. In June, West Ham released him.

=== Swansea City ===
Iriekpen joined Swansea City on a free transfer in August 2003, signing an 18-month contract in November 2003. An ankle injury requiring surgery in July 2004 meant that he missed pre-season training but despite this, he helped Swansea to automatic promotion from League Two in May 2005. He signed a further two-year contract in May 2005, tying him to the club until 2007. A serious knee injury sustained during a match against Nottingham Forest in February 2006, which saw Iriekpen stretchered off and needing an operation, ruled him out for the rest of the 2005–06 season. At the end of the 2007 season, Iriekpen left Swansea by mutual consent having made a total of 137 league and cup appearances for Swansea, scoring eight goals.

=== Scunthorpe United ===
Iriekpen signed a two-year contract with Scunthorpe United on 19 June 2007, with the option of a third year. He scored on his debut against Charlton Athletic. He was also given captaincy of the team for the 2008/09 season. On 30 December, Sky Sports reported Iriekpen asked to be placed on the transfer list and published a statement from the former Captain about his future plans.

Izzy parted company with Scunthorpe on 16 January 2009 to look at an opportunity with Bristol City.

=== Bristol City ===
On 26 January Gary Johnson, Bristol City manager, confirmed Iriekpen was on trial at the west country club with a view to signing a permanent deal. Iriekpen had been due to sign for Hamilton Academicals however he turned down this move to train with Bristol City. On 29 January 2009 joined Bristol City until the end of the 2008–2009 season. Iriekpen was released by Bristol City on 1 July 2009.

=== Hamilton Academical ===
On 26 July 2009, Iriekpen signed a two-year contract with Hamilton Academical, but left due to family reasons on 29 August.

== Personal life ==
In September 2015, Iriekpen appeared in court at the Old Bailey in London charged with common assault wounding with intent and an alternative charge of unlawful wounding after a glassing incident with a bouncer at a night club in Notting Hill, London. In March 2016, he was found guilty of wounding and was jailed for three years and three months.

== International career ==
Iriekpen made three appearances for the England under-19 side in 1999, scoring twice.

== Honours ==
West Ham United

- FA Youth Cup: 1999

Swansea

- League Two Promotion: 2004–05
- Football League Trophy: 2005–06
