= Maurice Doyle =

English footballer

Maurice Doyle VI
Personal information
- Date of birth: 17 October 1969 (age 57)
- Place of birth: Ellesmere Port, England
- Height: 5 ft 8 in (1.73 m)
- Position: Midfielder

Senior career*
Years	Team	Apps	(Gls)
1988–1989	Crewe Alexandra	8	(2)
1989–1995	Queens Park Rangers	6	(0)
1990	→ Wolverhampton Wanderers (loan)	0	(0)
1991	→ Crewe Alexandra (loan)	7	(2)
1995–1998	Millwall	66	(1)
1998–2000	Telford United	22	(1)
2000–2001	TNS	29	(3)
2001–2004	Oswestry Town		
2004–20??	Castrol Social		
- * Club domestic league appearances and goals

Maurice Doyle (born 17 October 1969) is an English former footballer.

== Career ==
Doyle began playing football at the age of 9, began playing football for Polygon and then Princess Villa in the Ellesmere Port League. He was given a trial at Crewe Alexandra, where he began his professional career as a trainee, along with Rob Jones and Craig Hignett. He made his senior debut in 1988. He signed for Queens Park Rangers for £80,000 in 1989, where he spent six seasons but failed to become a first-team regular, playing only six times in the league for Rangers. He made his most first team appearances at his next club, Millwall, after a £25,000 move.

After being released by Millwall at the end of the 1997-98 season, he had a trial at Shrewsbury Town but was only offered a month-long contract. Instead, he dropped into non-league with Telford United, where he played until 2000.

Doyle later played for several clubs since in the Welsh Premier League and English non-league. He was later player-manager of Cheshire-based amateur club Castrol Social, winning the Pyke Cup in 2008. Doyle can now be often found playing for Queens Park Rangers in the Football Masters.
