= Greg Berry =

English footballer

Personal information
- Full name: Gregory John Berry
- Date of birth: 5 March 1971 (age 55)
- Place of birth: Grays, England
- Position: Winger

Senior career*
Years	Team	Apps	(Gls)
1988–1989	East Thurrock United		
1989–1992	Leyton Orient	80	(14)
1992–1994	Wimbledon	7	(1)
1994–1997	Millwall	34	(1)
1995	→ Brighton & Hove Albion (loan)	6	(2)
1996	→ Leyton Orient (loan)	7	(0)
- Purfleet
- * Club domestic league appearances and goals

Greg Berry (born 5 March 1971) is an English retired footballer who played as a winger. He is the head coach and technical director at Peace Arch Soccer Club and is also coaching at Coastal WFC in British Columbia, Canada.
