= Damien Webber =

English footballer

Personal information
- Full name: Damien John Webber
- Date of birth: 8 October 1968 (age 58)
- Place of birth: Rustington, England
- Height: 6 ft 4 in (1.93 m)
- Position: Central defender

Senior career*
Years	Team	Apps	(Gls)
1991–1992	Crawley Town	?	(?)
1993–1994	Bognor Regis Town	?	(?)
1994–1998	Millwall	65	(4)
1998–2001	Worthing	?	(?)
2002–2003	Burgess Hill Town	?	(?)
2003	Southwick	?	(?)
2003–2004	Three Bridges	?	(?)
- * Club domestic league appearances and goals

Damien Webber (born 8 October 1968) is an English former professional footballer who played in the Football League, as a defender.
