= Jason van Blerk =

Australian soccer player

Personal information
- Date of birth: 16 March 1968 (age 58)
- Place of birth: Sydney, Australia
- Height: 1.83 m (6 ft 0 in)
- Positions: Defender; attacking midfielder

Team information
- Current team: Southern Ettalong 45's

Youth career
- 1986: AIS

Senior career*
| Years | Team | Apps | (Gls) |
| 1987–1989 | Blacktown City | 24 | (3) |
| 1989–1990 | APIA Leichhardt | 25 | (1) |
| 1990–1991 | Sint Truiden | 23 | (2) |
| 1991–1992 | APIA Leichhardt | 14 | (2) |
| 1992 | St. George | 9 | (1) |
| 1992–1995 | Go Ahead Eagles | 48 | (5) |
| 1994–1997 | Millwall | 73 | (2) |
| 1997–1998 | Manchester City | 19 | (0) |
| 1998–2001 | West Bromwich Albion | 109 | (3) |
| 2001–2002 | Stockport County | 13 | (0) |
| 2001–2002 | Hull City | 10 | (1) |
| 2002–2003 | Shrewsbury Town | 23 | (1) |
| 2003–2004 | Altrincham | 3 | (0) |
| 2003–2004 | Colwyn Bay | 3 | (0) |
| 2003–2004 | Wollongong City | 12 | (1) |
| 2003–2005 | Runcorn F.C. Halton | 0 | (0) |
| 2005–2006 | APIA Leichhardt | ? | (?) |
| Total | | 408 | (22) |

International career^{‡}
| 1987 | Australia U-20 | | |
| 1990–2000 | Australia | 27 | (1) |

Managerial career
- 2009–2013: GHFA Spirit FC
- 2013–present: Central Coast Mariners Academy
- * Club domestic league appearances and goals as of 12 May 2009 ‡ National team caps and goals as of 17 December 2007

Jason van Blerk (born 16 March 1968 in Sydney, Australia) is a former Australian footballer. He played primarily as a midfielder, but could also play in defense. He played for clubs, both overseas and locally. He also represented Australia both at youth and senior level.

== Club career ==
Van Blerk started his club career at Blacktown City Demons in Australia. He made his first move to Europe when he signed for Sint Truiden in Belgium in 1990. He then made subsequent moves to Go Ahead Eagles in the Netherlands and Millwall in England.

He was then brought to Manchester City on a free transfer at the start of their 1997–98 campaign by Frank Clark. However, he struggled there and only lasted seven months. West Bromwich Albion then bought him for £250k in March 1998. He ended up playing 109 games for them (scoring three goals). He left West Bromwich Albion in 2001. He then played for Stockport County, Hull City (where he scored once against Rushden & Diamonds), Shrewsbury Town (where he scored twice against Rochdale in the league and Barrow in the FA Cup), Altrincham and Colwyn Bay, before returning home to Australia, where he signed for Wollongong City in 2003. He left Australia again briefly to play for Runcorn F.C. Halton in England, before returning home again to play for APIA Leichhardt. He then retired in 2006.

== International career ==
Jason played for the senior national team 33 times. He scored his first international goal against Croatia in 1992. He made his national team debut against Indonesia after coming on for Tom McCulloch in the 46th minute at the Senayan Stadium, Jakarta. He did not play any games between 1996 and 1999, mostly due to lack of game time at club level (while he was at Manchester City F.C.). He got his last four caps (against Chile, Bulgaria, Czech Republic and Paraguay) in 2000 after regaining form at West Bromwich Albion.

Van Blerk also represented Australia at youth level when played in the 1987 FIFA U-20 World Cup in Chile. He was also an Australian Schoolboy International player in 1986.

== Managerial career ==
In November 2008, Van Blerk was appointed the new coach of GHFA Spirit FC for the club's first season in the NSW Super League in 2009.

In October 2013, Van Blerk was announced as the new head coach for National Premier League side Central Coast Mariners Academy under the guidance of technical director Phil Moss who also works as assistant coach for the Mariners A-League squad.

== Personal life ==
Jason van Blerk is the son of former Socceroo Cliff.
