= Dave Savage =

Irish footballer

Personal information
- Full name: David Savage
- Date of birth: 30 July 1973 (age 53)
- Place of birth: Dublin, Ireland
- Height: 1.88 m (6 ft 2 in)
- Position: Midfielder

Senior career*
Years	Team	Apps	(Gls)
1990–1991	Kilkenny City	20	(1)
1991–1992	Brighton & Hove Albion	0	(0)
1992–1994	Longford Town	60	(8)
1994–1998	Millwall	133	(6)
1998–2001	Northampton Town	113	(18)
2001–2003	Oxford United	85	(5)
2003–2005	Bristol Rovers	65	(3)
2005–2007	Rushden & Diamonds	67	(3)
2007–2008	Brackley Town	50	
2008–2010	Oxford City	100	

International career
1996	Republic of Ireland	5	(0)
- * Club domestic league appearances and goals as of 18:10, 18 August 2007 (UTC)

David Savage (born 30 July 1973) is an Irish former professional footballer who last played for Southern League Premier Division side Oxford City as a midfielder.

== Career ==
Savage left Oxford United after being their Player of the Year to reunite with manager Ian Atkins at Bristol Rovers. He enjoyed a reasonably good spell of two years at Rovers before moving back North for family reasons.

He earned 5 caps playing for his country.

He made a scoring League of Ireland debut for Kilkenny City on 7 October 1990.
