= Banfield (surname) =

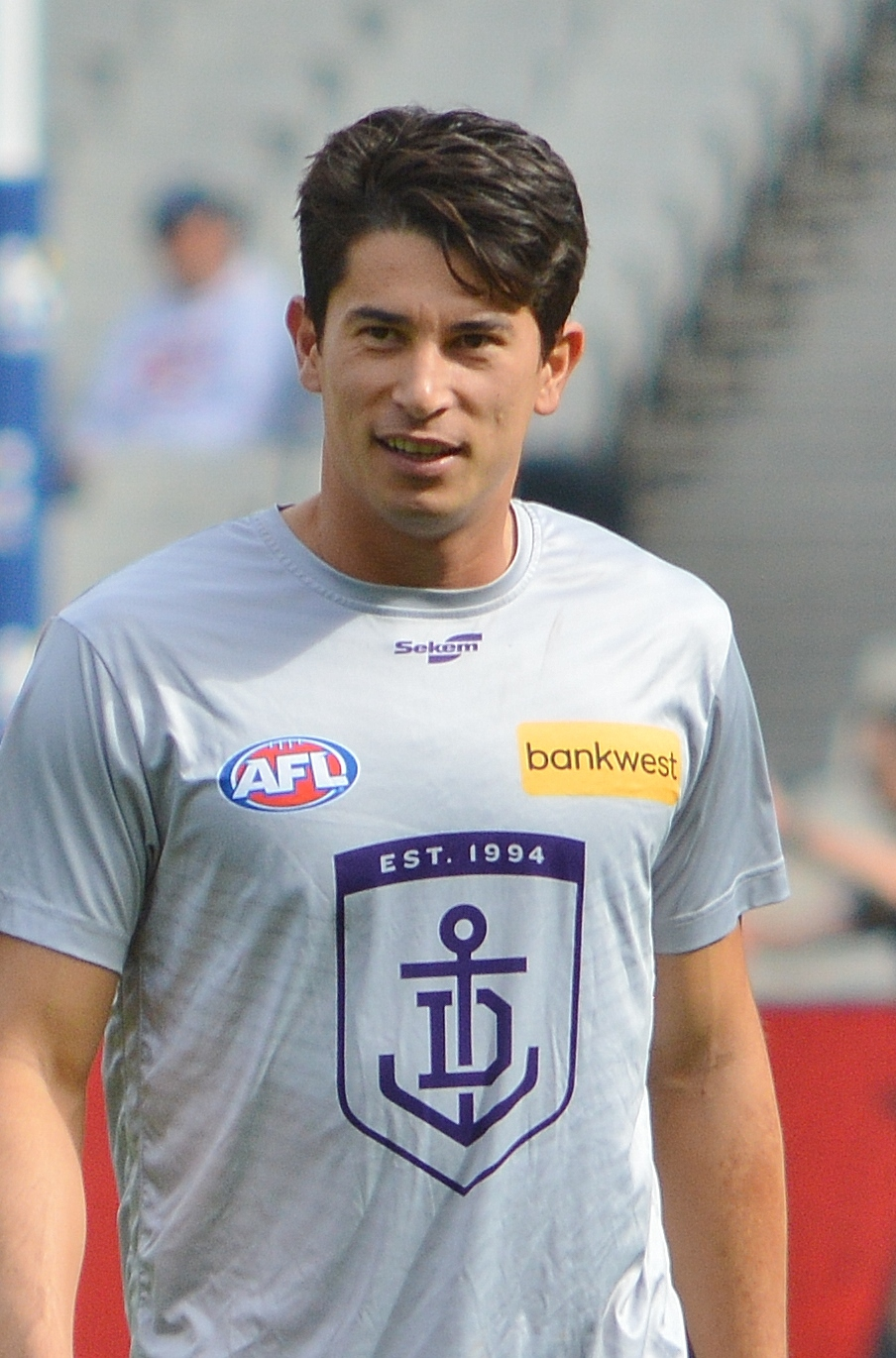
- Bailey Banfield In April 2025
- Gender: Unisex
- Language: English

Origin
- Origin: English
- Region of origin: Irish

Other names
- Related names: Bandfield, Benfield, Binfield, Bamfield

Banfield is a surname of Irish origin, and a variant of "Bonville" from the place name in France. It can also be a unisex given name.

== People with the surname ==
- Alex Banfield (born 1990), English opera and concert tenor
- Albert Banfield (1912–1970), English professional footballer
- Alexander William Francis Banfield (Frank Banfield, A W.F. Banfield; 1918–1996), Canadian mammalogist
- Ann Banfield (fl. 1975–2000), American professor of English
- Arthur Banfield (1897–1972), English cricketer
- Ashleigh Banfield (born 1967), Canadian-born TV journalist
- Bailey Banfield (born 1998), Australian rules footballer
- Brendan Banfield (fl. 2020s), murderer
- Christine Banfield (1985–2023), murder victim
- David Banfield (born 1979), AHL and former NHL referee
- David Banfield (priest) (1933–2014), Archdeacon of Bristol from 1990 until 1998
- Donald Hubert Louis Banfield (1916–2014), trade unionist and politician in the State of South Australia
- Drew Banfield (born 1974), Australian Rules footballer
- E. C. Banfield (1828–1887), American lawyer who served as Solicitor of the United States Treasury
- Edith D. Banfield was an American state legislator in New Hampshire She lived in Moultonborough
- Edmund James Banfield (1852–1923), Australian newspaper proprietor, writer and naturalist
- Edward Banfield (disambiguation)
  - Edward Banfield (railroad engineer) (died 1872), Argentina-based British railway engineer and businessman
  - Edward C. Banfield (1916–1999), American political scientist
- Francis J. Banfield (1827–1883), American soldier
- Frank Banfield (1905–1970), British politician in London County Council
- Geoffrey Banfield, father of Helen Clark
- George Banfield (1888–1963), British film producer and director
- Gottfried von Banfield (1890–1986), Austro-Hungarian naval aviator in the First World War, later businessman
- Jillian Banfield (born 1959), American geomicrobiologist and biogeochemist
- John Banfield (1875–1945), British trade unionist and Labour Party politician, Member of Parliament (MP) for Wednesbury 1932–1945
- Jordon Banfield (born 1986), American baseball coach
- Laurie Banfield (1889–1979), English footballer who played as a left back
- Matilda Banfield (born 2005), Australian rules footballer playing for the Fremantle Football Club
- Mildred Banfield (1914–1991), American politician
- Neil Banfield (born 1962), English professional football coach and former player
- Peter Banfield (born 21 January 1965) American rules footballer In the Victorian Football League
- Raffaello de Banfield (1922–2008), British-born Italian composer
- Ron Banfield (born 1933), former Australian rules footballer who played with St Kilda Football Club in the Victorian Football League
- Sherrone Banfield Moore (born 1986), American former college football
- Shirley Banfield, one of several people
- Stephen Banfield (born 1951), British musicologist
- Todd Banfield (born 1990), Australian rules football player who played in the Australian Football League
- Will Banfield (born 1999), American professional baseball catcher

== People with the given name ==
- Edith Banfield Jackson (born 1895-1977) was a child psychiatrist
- Robert Banfield Capron Jr. (born July 9, 1998), American actor

== Fictional characters ==
- Catherine Banfield, fictional character in the American medical drama ER

== See also ==
- Banfield, Argentina
- Banfield, Michigan
- Banfield (disambiguation)
