= Bandfield =

Bandfield is a surname of Irish origin, and a variant of Banfield. Notable people with the surname include:

- John Bandfield (September 29, 1826 – November 7, 1903) American politician
- Joshua Bandfield (July 16, 1974 – June 13, 2019) American planetary scientist

== See also ==
- Bandfield (crater)
- Banfield (surname)
- Benfield
- Binfield (disambiguation)
