= Benefield (surname) =

Benefield is an English toponymic surname from one or more of the numerous places in England called Benfield or Binfield. Notable people with this name include:

- Barry Benefield (1877–1971), American writer
- Daved Benefield (born 1968), American former professional footballer
- David Benefield (born 1986), American poker player
- Jimmy Benefield (born 1983), English footballer
- Kim Benefield, American politician
- Sebastian Benefield (1559–1630), English priest and academic
- Ty Benefield (born 2005), American football player

== Other ==
- Benefield Anechoic Facility
- Benefield Castle
- Lower Benefield
- Upper Benefield

== See also ==
- Benfield, a spelling variation
