= List of killings by law enforcement officers in the United States, February 2023 =

This is a list of people reported killed by non-military law enforcement officers in the United States in February 2023, whether in the line of duty or not, and regardless of reason or method. The listing documents the occurrence of a death, making no implications regarding wrongdoing or justification on the part of the person killed or officer involved. Killings are arranged by date of the incident that caused death. Different death dates, if known, are noted in the description. The table below lists 100 people.

== February 2023 ==
Date	Name (age) of deceased	Race	Location	Description
2023-02-28	Randall J. Wesolek Jr. (43)	White	Branson, Missouri	Wesolek reportedly brandished a gun after officers asked him to exit his vehicle at a gas station. A struggle allegedly occurred, during which officers fatally shot Wesolek.
2023-02-28	Alaunte Scott (22)	Black	Washington, DC	
2023-02-28	Matthew A. Sansotta (36)	White	Phoenix, Arizona	Police responded to erratic driving and found Sansotta lying in his truck with multiple firearms inside. Police shot Sansotta dead after he allegedly reached for a handgun.
2023-02-28	Brandon M. Zurkan (31)	White	Canandaigua, NY	
2023-02-28	Mia Tulasi Dasa (20)	Unknown race	Roseburg, OR	
2023-02-28	Billy James Sites (44)	White	Charlottesville, VA	
2023-02-26	Chevy Thomas (36)	Black	Haverstraw, NY	
2023-02-25	Name Withheld (40)	Unknown race	Dade City, FL	
2023-02-25	Kevin Veal (26)	Black	Terrytown, LA	
2023-02-25	Pamela Croston (52)	White	Circleville, OH	
2023-02-25	William Tisdol (48)	Black	Springfield, Massachusetts	Police responded to a suspect allegedly armed with a firearm and threatening people at MGM Springfield. During a foot chase, officers fatally shot Tisdol after he reportedly fired shots at them.
2023-02-25	Victor Lykins (47)	White	Middletown, OH	
2023-02-24	Christine Banfield (37)	White	Herndon, Virginia	IRS special agent Brendan Banfield and au pair Juliana Peres Magalhães killed Brendan's wife Christine and Joseph Ryan at the Banfield residence as part of murders motivated by an affair between Brendan and Peres Magalhães. Posing as Christine Banfield on a fetish website, Brendan connected with Ryan and convinced him to come to the home under the guise that Ryan would be acting out a home invasion fantasy. After Ryan arrived, Brendan shot him and stabbed Christine, with the goal of making it seem like Ryan had killed Christine and was shot by Brendan in self-defense. Peres Magalhães also shot Ryan. Peres Magalhães pleaded guilty to manslaughter and agreed to testify against Banfield, who was convicted of aggravated murder.
2023-02-24	Joseph Ryan (39)	White	Herndon, Virginia	
2023-02-24	Erin Williamson (28)	White	Murray, KY	
2023-02-24	Osiris Rashad Solomon Bennett (23)	Black	Atlanta, Georgia	Two undercover MARTA officers attempted to arrest a man, Bennett, who they suspected of carrying marijuana. Bennett attempted to escape and was tased by an officer. He pulled out a gun and the police shot him. No officers were injured, and Bennett was pronounced dead at the hospital
2023-02-24	James Lanier (34)	Black	Duplin County, North Carolina	Lanier walked into a store nude and confronted several customers. An officer who responded tased Lanier, then shot him to death when he charged them.
2023-02-24	Zachary Shogren (34)	White	Duluth, Minnesota	Shogren allegedly threatened violence, causing officers to respond. He was shot and killed by officers after he allegedly threatened them with a knife.
2023-02-24	Adrienne Arrington (39)	Black	Pittsburgh, Pennsylvania	Arrington was shot and killed by officers after she allegedly fired at them with a pistol.
2023-02-23	Leonardo Hernandez (42)	Hispanic	Sunland Park, NM	
2023-02-23	Jovanny Vanegas (28)	Hispanic	Port Arthur, TX	
2023-02-22	Jason Resendez (47)	Hispanic	Phoenix, Arizona	Resendez was identified by patrolling officers as a potential suspect in another crime. He was shot to death by police after he reportedly brandished a handgun at officers.
2023-02-22	Derin Holmes (41)	Unknown	Phoenix, Arizona	Holmes was shot and killed by police as he fled officers after he reportedly fired a gun at police.
2023-02-22	Sabeeh Alalkawi (30)	Asian	Troy, New York	While responding to an emergency call, a police officer crashed into Alalkawi's car, killing him.
2023-02-22	Mariela Cardenas (42)	Hispanic	Los Angeles, CA	
2023-02-22	Timothy McCree Johnson (37)	Black	Tysons, Virginia	Police were notified by loss prevention officers that a man was stealing sunglasses from a Nordstrom store at Tysons Corner Center. Police pursued the man, Johnson, about a quarter mile on foot, ending in a wooded area. Two officers gave commands to Johnson to get on the ground before firing. Fairfax County Police Chief Kevin Davis stated he did not know if Johnson was armed or not, and an investigation found no weapons on or near Johnson. One of the two officers, a sergeant, was later fired. That sergeant would later be found guilty of reckless use of a handgun in Johnson's death, but Virginia Governor Glenn Youngkin commuted the sentence of the officer in March 2025.
2023-02-21	Christian Drye (30)	White	Hemet, CA	
2023-02-21	Name Withheld (70)	Unknown race	Denver, CO	
2023-02-21	Michael Dishong (46)	White	Palm Bay, FL	
2023-02-21	Amarion Hope (17)	Black	Avondale, Arizona	Hope was shot and killed by police as he ran away from law enforcement. He allegedly got into a struggle with officers before the shooting. Police reported he possessed several knives.
2023-02-21	Herman Lucas (31)	Black	Milwaukee, Wisconsin	After crashing a car and fleeing, Lucas was fatally shot while he was fleeing with an alleged gun in his hand.
2023-02-21	Joe Michael Goss (45)	Hispanic	Harker Heights, TX	
2023-02-21	Booker Talefares Pannell (40)	Black	Elk Grove, CA	
2023-02-20	Coty Earnest (42)	White	Okolona, MS	
2023-02-20	Michael James Trask (39)	White	Goddard, Kansas	After a police chase, Trask allegedly approached an officer with a BB gun, causing the officer to open fire and kill him.
2023-02-19	Maria Martin (22)	Black	Livonia, Michigan	An off-duty Detroit Police officer shot Martin, another DPD officer and his recent ex-girlfriend, before killing himself. The couple had two children, including a one-year-old who was home but not harmed during the shooting.
2023-02-19	Brent Allen Thompson (28)	White	Fort Collins, CO	
2023-02-19	Michael Thomas Ghione (75)	White	West Goshen Township, Pennsylvania	An officer driving without lights or sirens on lost control of his vehicle after looking down at a work computer. The car hit a guardrail and struck Ghione, a bicyclist, from behind. In March the officer was charged with careless driving resulting in unintentional death.
2023-02-18	Gary Thomas Duncan (45)	White	Clinton, MT	
2023-02-18	Rodney G. Williams (66)	White	Toulon, IL	
2023-02-18	Joshua A. Baker (37)	White	Greenville, TN	
2023-02-18	Jon Cuong Tran Le (26)	Asian	Houston, TX	
2023-02-18	Name Withheld	Unknown race	Spencer, WV	
2023-02-18	Joshua Kinyon Taft (31)	White	Tulsa, OK	
2023-02-17	Zabina Gafoor (52)	South Asian	New York City, New York	An NYPD vehicle responding to an emergency call in Queens hit a car that turned in front of it. The NYPD vehicle then moved towards the sidewalk, where it struck a pedestrian standing in a bike lane, killing her. The NYPD vehicle stopped after it hit an unoccupied car.
2023-02-17	Steve John Roosa (64)	White	Brooksville, FL	
2023-02-17	Luis A. Birrueta (29)	Hispanic	Grandview, WA	
2023-02-16	Wesley Darwin Walls (38)	White	Burns, TN	
2023-02-16	Name Withheld (56)	Unknown race	Enid, OK	
2023-02-16	Name Withheld (22)	Unknown race	Miami, FL	
2023-02-15	Tyquorious Walker (27)	Black	Sugar Land, TX	
2023-02-14	Hector Valdez Perez (63)	Hispanic	Dunnigan, CA	
2023-02-14	Jordan Taylor Mays (28)	White	Salisbury, NC	
2023-02-12	Ronnie Demetris Hill (51)	Black	Avondale, AZ	
2023-02-12	Edmond Exline (45)	White	Martinsburg, WV	
2023-02-12	Yia Xiong (65)	Asian	Saint Paul, Minnesota	Police responded to calls of a knife-wielding man at an apartment on the 100 block of Western Avenue South in Saint Paul. According to police officer accounts and body camera footage, Yia Xiong, a Hmong American man, advanced towards police officers while holding the knife, prompting officers to fatally shoot the man.
2023-02-11	Bryan Funk (40)	Hispanic	Phoenix, AZ	
2023-02-11	Bret Andrews (46)	White	Grove City, OH	
2023-02-11	Christine Elizabeth Woodward (47)	White	Sullivan, PA	
2023-02-10	Austin Heiselman (48)	White	La Habra, CA	
2023-02-10	Xavier Arnold (20)	White	Allentown, PA	
2023-02-10	Everett Byram (34)	White	Palmdale, California	Police responded to a domestic violence call at Byram's home. During the call Byram allegedly moved towards deputies holding an edged weapon, leading deputies to shoot him.
2023-02-09	David Couch III (31)	White	Redding, California	A California Highway Patrol trooper responded to reports of a man waving a gun while driving. The trooper found a vehicle matching the description in a driveway, with Couch in the driver's seat. The trooper and Couch got into a fight after Couch allegedly did not obey commands, and the trooper shot Couch. Police did not say if a gun was found. Per state law, the California Department of Justice investigated the shooting, as Couch was unarmed when he was killed.
2023-02-09	Bradley S. Havermale (29)	White	Quincy, IL	
2023-02-09	Damon Dante Henderson (20)	Black	Spiro, OK	
2023-02-08	Mark Bennett Hopkins (22)	White	College Station, Texas	During a search warrant, Hopkins allegedly fired a shotgun at officers. An officer returned fire, killing him.
2023-02-08	Isidro Valverde (21)	Hispanic	Chicago, Illinois	Valverde was shot during a chase. It's unknown if he shot at officers.
2023-02-08	Julius Hamilton (34)	Black	Albany, OR	
2023-02-07	Stephen Earl McDaniel	White	Live Oak, FL	
2023-02-07	unidentified male	Unknown	Poplar Bluff, Missouri	A man with a knife was shot and killed by police after he allegedly charged at them.
2023-02-07	Terrell Thompson (19)	Black	Milwaukee, Wisconsin	Thompson was killed after he engaged in a shooting with Milwaukee Police Officer Peter Jerving, Killing Jerving.
2023-02-06	Jesus Antonio Rodriguez (33)	Hispanic	Moreno Valley, CA	
2023-02-06	Evan Kendrick Wollert (44)	Black	Colorado Springs, CO	
2023-02-06	Azaan Lee (21)	Black	Rantoul, IL	
2023-02-06	Alex Greene (21)	Unknown	Winter Haven, Florida	Police pursued Greene, who was suspected of shooting and wounding eleven people in a drive-by shooting in Lakeland on January 30. Following a chase, which ended at a restaurant parking lot, Greene carjacked a woman and allegedly drove her vehicle towards a Lakeland police officer, who shot Greene.
2023-02-05	Antonio Garza (44)	Hispanic	Palm Springs, CA	
2023-02-05	William "Scooter" White (34)	Black	Marion, IN	
2023-02-05	Anthony Richmond (28)	White	Mitchell, IN	
2023-02-05	Marianne Griffiths (56)	White	Easton, MA	
2023-02-04	Christopher Robin Osborne (49)	White	Huntsville, AL	
2023-02-04	Jason Wylie Harbin (40)	White	Cherokee, AL	
2023-02-04	Perri Sammarco (37)	White	Chula Vista, CA	
2023-02-04	Mohamed Bounaouar (42)	Middle Eastern	Fort Lee, NJ	
2023-02-04	Victoria Lauren Edwards (29)	White	Denton, TX	
2023-02-04	Name Withheld	Unknown race	Wesley Chapel, FL	
2023-02-03	John Anderton (50)	White	Kansas City, Kansas	Police responding to an overdose found Anderton fleeing on a bicycle. Anderton was allegedly armed and was shot and killed by officers after "some form of exchange" occurred.
2023-02-03	Devin C. Lark (29)	White	Jennings County, Indiana	Lark reportedly fled police and was fatally shot by an officer when he allegedly took out a gun.
2023-02-03	Glenn Edward Bays (35)	White	Prestonsburg, KY	
2023-02-03	David Alan Stockton (48)	White	Beaver Creek, MI	
2023-02-03	Erik James Wright (33)	White	Rapid City, SD	
2023-02-03	Apolinar Lozano III (44)	Hispanic	Anthony, TX	
2023-02-02	Ryheam Damon Brown (25)	Black	Lynchburg, Virginia	After Lynchburg Police officer John Person pulled over Brown in traffic, he allegedly ran away. Person fired six shots into his torso. Brown allegedly had a firearm when caught. Person did not face criminal charges.
2023-02-02	James Cross (68)	Unknown	Magnolia, Texas	
2023-02-02	Stephen Charles Poolson Jr (41)	White	Loveland, Colorado	
2023-02-02	Daniel Tang (21)	Asian	Calhoun, Georgia	Officers shot Tang while he was breaking into an empty business. Tang allegedly pointed a rifle at the officers before being shot.
2023-02-02	Darius L.J. Holcomb (39)	Black	Spartanburg, South Carolina	
2023-02-02	Torence Jackson Jr (28)	Black	Memphis, Tennessee	
2023-02-02	Thomas Gray (60)	White	Jacksonville, Florida	
2023-02-02	Alonzo Bagley (43)	Black	Shreveport, Louisiana	Officers responded to a reported domestic dispute at an apartment complex. Bagley jumped off a balcony and fled, and after a foot chase an officer shot him in the chest as he rounded a corner of the building. No weapons were found on or near Bagley. An arrest warrant was issued for the officer several weeks later.
2023-02-01	Justin Baker (33)	Unknown	Springfield, Missouri	

== See also ==
- Death in custody § United States
- Henry A. Wallace Police Crime Public Database
- List of cases of police brutality
- List of countries with annual rates and counts for killings by law enforcement officers
- List of law enforcement officers killed in the line of duty in the United States
- List of law enforcement officers convicted for an on-duty killing in the United States
- List of shootings by US immigration agents
- List of police reforms related to the George Floyd protests
- List of unarmed African Americans killed by law enforcement officers in the United States
- Lists of killings by law enforcement officers
- Police brutality in the United States
- Police misconduct § United States
- Police riot § United States
- Police use of deadly force in the United States
