= Banfield =

Banfield may refer to:

== People ==
- Banfield (surname)

== Other ==
- Banfield, Buenos Aires, a city in Argentina
  - Club Atlético Banfield, an Argentine football (soccer) team
- Banfield Expressway, the portion of Interstate 84 that is in Portland, Oregon, United States
- Banfield (pet hospitals), an operator of veterinary clinics across the United States, Mexico, and in the UK
- Banfield (TV program), a news interview TV program hosted by Ashleigh Banfield
- Banfield, Michigan, a village in Barry County, Michigan, USA
- Mount Banfield, a peak in Antarctica

== See also ==
- John Bandfield (1826–1903), New York politician
