= Unspeakable Sentences =

Unspeakable Sentences: Narration and Representation in the Language of Fiction is a study of sentences in free indirect speech and its limitations, published in 1982 by American literary expert and linguist Ann Banfield.
