= George M. Baird =

American physician and politician

George M. Baird (born December 11, 1839) was an American physician and politician from New York.

== Life ==
He was born on December 11, 1839, in Veteran, Chemung County, New York. He attended Union School in Horseheads, and the University of Michigan. During the American Civil War he joined the 161st New York Volunteer Infantry Regiment and served from 1862 to 1865 as a Hospital Steward. He graduated from Buffalo Medical College in 1866, and practiced medicine in Millport.

In November 1877, he was elected to the New York State Assembly, nominated by a Greenback, Labor and Reform convention. He polled 2,849 votes, while the Republican candidate received 2,661; and the Democratic candidate 2,544. Baird was a member of the 101st New York State Legislature in 1878.

== Sources ==
New York State Assembly
Preceded by Hosea H. Rockwell	New York State Assembly; Chemung County; 1878	Succeeded by John Bandfield
