= Killing of Jason Corbett =

2015 killing in North Carolina, U.S.

- Jason Corbett
- Date: 2 August 2015
- Location: Wallburg, North Carolina
- Cause: Assault
- Deaths: Jason Corbett (aged 39 years)
- Convicted: Molly Martens Corbett (wife) and Thomas Martens (father-in-law)
- Charges: voluntary manslaughter, reduced from second-degree murder
- Sentence: ~4 years imprisonment (reduced from 20 to 25 years)

On 2 August 2015, Jason Corbett, a 39‑year‑old Irish man, was killed at his home in Wallburg, North Carolina. Investigations later established that his death resulted from a physical assault carried out by his wife, Molly Martens Corbett, and her father, Thomas Martens.

The circumstances of Corbett's death received widespread media attention in Ireland. Martens and Thomas were found guilty of second‑degree murder in 2017, but their convictions were later overturned by the North Carolina Court of Appeals. After accepting plea bargains to reduced charges, both were released from prison in 2024.

== Background ==
Jason Corbett lived in Limerick, Ireland, with his first wife, Margaret "Mags" Fitzpatrick, and their two children, Jack and Sarah. Mags died in November 2006 after suffering an asthma attack. In April 2008, Corbett hired Molly Martens, a 24‑year‑old from Knoxville, Tennessee, as an au pair.

The family moved to Lexington, North Carolina, in April 2011, and Corbett and Martens later married. They lived at Panther Creek Court in Wallburg, North Carolina. Corbett bought the house for US$390,000 using the proceeds from the sale of his Limerick home and his savings. He also gave Martens US$80,000 for furnishings and bought her a BMW SUV. Corbett had previously given her father, Thomas, US$49,000 towards the wedding ceremony.

Martens allegedly wished to adopt Corbett's children so they could obtain American citizenship, but Corbett instead applied for green cards while retaining their Irish passports. He had also planned to return to Ireland and open a pizza restaurant at Spanish Point, County Clare.

Corbett's older brother, John, said the issue of adoption caused friction in the relationship. He stated that Corbett arranged the children's residency status through his job rather than through the Martens family because he was concerned they might not be repatriated to Ireland if he died unexpectedly. Court records show that Martens sought legal advice in 2013 and 2014 about custody rights in the event of a divorce. Witnesses said the couple tried to have a child, and Corbett spent US$25,000 on fertility treatment without success. Martens later alleged she had suffered multiple miscarriages.

Corbett's family became concerned about Martens' behaviour during the relationship. His sister, Tracey Lynch, later said that Martens had a history of dishonesty and had made several false allegations about her background. Lynch said Martens had told her she had bipolar disorder and had allegedly self‑harmed and misused alcohol. She also said Martens falsely alleged to have known Mags before her death and incorrectly stated that Mags had died from cancer.

Lynch later learned that Martens had been released from a secure psychiatric unit shortly before meeting Corbett in 2008 and had not disclosed her mental health history until shortly before their wedding. Martens allegedly misrepresented Sarah as her biological daughter to neighbours and told the children that Corbett had killed their mother, an allegation later corroborated by Sarah.

An affidavit submitted by Lynch cited further examples of alleged erratic behaviour, including inappropriate punishment of Jack and misrepresentations about the children to neighbours. Corbett family friend Lynn Shanahan alleged that Martens became angry when Jack reminded her she was not his mother and avoided telling neighbours that the children were not biologically hers, "becoming enraged" when Jack disclosed the truth. Another family friend stated that, a couple of days before he was killed, Corbett left a social function early after Martens criticised his weight in front of friends, and that he was self‑conscious about his weight. Lynch later said this incident contributed to Corbett's decision to return to Ireland without her.

== Death ==
On 2 August 2015, Thomas called 911 at 3 am to report that Corbett was badly injured. He told the dispatcher he had intervened in a fight between Corbett and his daughter Martens and may have killed him. Police responders arrived at the house at Panther Creek Court and found Corbett unresponsive with serious head injuries that later proved fatal. Both Thomas and Martens gave statements linking Corbett's death to a "domestic disturbance".

A few hours after being released from police custody, Martens allegedly paid for the house to be professionally cleaned. Authorities prevented her attempt to have Corbett cremated before his family arrived from Ireland, and she only permitted them access to his remains after they signed an agreement to cover the costs of his funeral and the repatriation of his body. Sarah later described the memorial service as "absolutely bizarre". Lynch said the Martens family hired off‑duty police officers to prevent the Corbett family from attending.

=== Custody of Corbett's children ===
In 2007, Corbett created a will naming his sister and her husband as guardians of his children should he die, and he did not alter the will after marrying Martens. A few days after Corbett's death, Martens filed for custody of ten‑year‑old Jack and eight‑year‑old Sarah, whom she had raised as their mother figure for eight years. When Corbett's family arrived in the United States, they filed a legal challenge, and on 20 August 2015 the authorities dismissed Martens' claim and granted custody to Lynch, who flew the children back to Ireland. Judge Brian Shipwash later said Martens had a "deranged entitlement" to the children, that he was shocked they had initially been placed in her custody, and that he feared she might harm them, so his priority was to return them to Ireland as soon as possible. On 26 August 2015, after a funeral service at Our Lady Queen of Peace Church in Limerick, Corbett was buried beside his first wife at Castlemungret Cemetery.

On 31 August 2015, Martens crashed her brother's car into a brick mailbox belonging to neighbours in Knoxville. Witness Stephen Eimers said she appeared impaired and spoke about the children being taken to Ireland. When her parents arrived, all three asked him not to contact the police. Thomas later compensated the owner of the mailbox.

For several months after the children's repatriation, Martens posted photos of the children on Facebook. The Corbett family sent her a cease and desist requesting that she stop posting images of the children. In response to claims by Martens' uncle that Corbett had sought dual Irish‑American citizenship for the children, the Corbett family issued a statement rejecting the allegations.

== Police investigation ==
In police interviews a few hours after Corbett's death, Thomas said he had been staying at the house when he was awakened by a disturbance in the master bedroom. He said he took a baseball bat and went to the room, where he alleged he saw Corbett strangling Martens. After a struggle between the two men, Martens struck Corbett with a paving stone on the head, and Thomas hit him with the bat several times. Investigating officers noted that Thomas, who had studied law at Emory University in Georgia, repeatedly emphasized his "state of mind" during his interview, possibly because a self‑defence plea would depend on showing that he and Martens feared for their lives. In a separate interview, Martens admitted she had attempted to hit Corbett with a brick during the incident. She also said there had been domestic violence in the marriage and that she had sought medical assistance on several occasions, although she did not tell police or hospital staff how her injuries occurred. Martens further alleged that Corbett was a heavy drinker and that he had been drunk during the fatal incident.

On the day of Corbett's death, his two children were interviewed by the North Carolina Union County Department of Social Services. Transcripts recorded Sarah saying her father had anger management issues and describing an incident in which Corbett pulled Martens' hair and "smacked her in the face". Jack alleged he had seen his father assault Martens and stated that "his dad gets mad at his mom [Molly] for no good reason". Nine months later, Jack withdrew his earlier statements in a follow‑up video call with the sheriff's office, saying Martens had coached him and had made up false stories about abuse.

On 5 January 2016, Martens and Thomas were charged with second‑degree murder and voluntary manslaughter after unsealed indictments showed a grand jury had found probable cause. They were ordered to surrender their passports and not to contact Corbett's children in Ireland, and were released on bail of US$200,000 each.

In July 2016, the defence filed a motion to exclude Jack's later rebuttal interview, arguing it was "hearsay and unreliable". During pre‑trial hearings in June 2017, Lynch testified that after returning Jack to Ireland he told her that some of the information he had given US social workers was untrue. Judge Lee ruled that the children's statements taken shortly after their father's death were inadmissible and could not be submitted as evidence. The following month, lawyers for Martens and Thomas filed a motion seeking to prevent the prosecution from presenting Corbett as a non‑violent, easygoing person.

== First trial ==
The trial of Martens and Thomas began with jury selection on 17 July 2017 at the Davidson County Superior Court in Lexington, North Carolina, before Judge David Lee. Both entered pleas of not guilty to the second-degree murder of Corbett, alleging they acted in self-defence.

=== Opening statements ===
On 25 July 2017, District Attorney Alan Martin told the jury that Corbett had suffered such serious head injuries that the autopsy could not determine how many times he was struck, and that traces of Trazodone were found in his bloodstream. Although Corbett had never been prescribed the sedative, medical records showed that Martens had been issued a prescription three days before he died. Martin said Corbett's body was found naked and covered in blood, while neither Martens nor Thomas appeared to have physical injuries. Defence lawyer David Freedman, acting for Thomas, said his client struck Corbett with a baseball bat to protect himself and Martens after finding Corbett with his arm around her throat and allegedly saying, "I am going to kill her, I am going to kill her".

=== Prosecution evidence ===
David Fritzche, the Corbetts' next door neighbor, testified that he and Corbett had mowed their lawns the day before Corbett died and later drank beer together at around 3 pm. Their wives joined them, and they continued drinking until Martens' parents arrived at 8 pm for a weekend visit. Fritzche said Corbett had consumed seven beers, was in good humour, and did not appear to be drunk when they parted. Toxicological testing recorded a blood alcohol concentration of 20 milligrams of alcohol per 100 milliliters of blood (0.02%), a quarter of the legal driving limit in North Carolina.

Davidson County Emergency Call Centre agent Karen Capps, who had worked as a dispatcher for 16 years, testified that she took the 911 call on the night Corbett was killed. After the recording was played to the court, Capps said Thomas sounded "surprisingly calm" during the 14-minute call and did not sound out of breath despite alleging to have performed CPR chest compressions while Martens counted aloud. Dr Craig Nelson, an associate pathologist with the North Carolina Chief Medical Examiner's Office, testified that Corbett's skull was so badly damaged he could not determine the exact number of blows, but estimated around 12. He said several of the blows individually could have rendered Corbett unconscious or caused death. Autopsy reports also recorded blunt force trauma to Corbett's torso and arms. Proceedings paused briefly when a juror became ill while viewing photographs of Corbett's injuries.

Corporal Clayton Dagenhardt, the first officer at the scene, testified that blood was present on the walls, floor, bed, hallway and bedroom. He photographed the scene and later assisted in taking Corbett's children outside. Nurse Katie Wingate‑Scott testified that she prescribed Trazodone to Martens on 30 July 2015, and pharmacist James Hiatt confirmed the prescription had been filled. Paramedics David Bent and Amanda Hackworth testified that they arrived less than 10 minutes after Thomas called 911 and attempted to revive Corbett. They said Corbett's body temperature was lower than expected and no electrical heart activity was detected, and resuscitation efforts ceased at 3:24 am. Hackworth said she asked officers how long the Martens had waited before calling 911 and was told they said they phoned immediately.

Lieutenant Frank Young testified that after being told Martens had accused Corbett of strangling her, he photographed her to document any injuries but found none. He said he asked Martens to stop rubbing her neck while he took the photographs. Former police officer David Dillard testified that Martens was rubbing her neck while sitting in his patrol car and that although she made crying noises, he did not see tears. Dr Stuart James, a forensic scientist, testified that bloodstain analysis indicated some blows may have occurred while Corbett was in bed, and that other spatters suggested multiple blows as he fell to the floor. He said bloodstains on the inside hem of Thomas's boxer shorts indicated Corbett's head was on the floor when those blows were struck. He also testified that blood drips on a vacuum cleaner appeared inconsistent with normal patterns, suggesting the scene had been altered before police photographs were taken.

Joanne Lowry, who worked with Thomas at the United States Department of Energy, testified that before Corbett and Martens wedding in 2011, Thomas expressed dislike for Corbett and his friends. She also said that two months before Corbett's death, Thomas told her, "That son-in-law, I hate him." Corbett's sister testified that Corbett had been homesick and planned to return to Ireland so his son could start high school there, and that he had mentioned returning more than a year before he died.

On 3 August 2017, at the close of the prosecution's case, defence lawyers moved to dismiss the murder charges. The judge ruled that prima facie evidence had been established and directed the jury to consider a verdict after the defence submissions concluded.

=== Defense submissions ===
Taking the stand in his own defense, Thomas said that on the night in question he was awakened by screaming and loud noises from Martens' bedroom, and that when he entered the room he saw Corbett with his hands around her neck. He said he struck Corbett with a baseball bat and, after a struggle, continued hitting him on the floor because he feared for his life. Thomas said he did not leave the room as he believed Martens would have been killed without his intervention. He also acknowledged that he disliked his son‑in‑law, referring to an incident before the wedding in which some of Corbett's friends had allegedly been drinking, smoking and using bad language in his house. Under cross-examination, Thomas admitted he had advised Martens to seek a divorce, saying Corbett did not meet what he considered his daughter's standard. He also accepted that he had never witnessed or been told of any domestic violence involving Corbett and Martens before the night Corbett was killed.

Martens declined to give evidence and exercised her right to silence.

=== Closing arguments ===
Assistant District Attorney Greg Brown told the jury that Martens had motives to have her husband killed, noting that she would inherit the marital home and its contents, a US$600,000 life insurance policy, and custody of Corbett's children. Brown reminded the jury that Corbett had refused to sign adoption papers granting Martens equal rights to Jack and Sarah, and that he had planned to return to Ireland without her. Brown also argued that Thomas's hands had no blood on them despite alleging to have performed CPR, and that Corbett's unusually low body temperature suggested the 911 call had not been made immediately and that CPR had been faked.

Defence lawyer Walter Holton argued that authorities had not taken samples from under their fingernails and that redness on Martens' neck had not been explained. He said Martens had nothing to gain from Corbett's death, as she was not named in his will and would not benefit from the life insurance policy or custody. Holton asked the jury to consider the circumstances of Corbett's death, noting that Corbett had drunk several beers and was larger than Thomas. The defence also argued that the prosecution had not demonstrated malice, required for second‑degree murder under North Carolina law, and said Dr Stuart James had not visited the crime scene. They added that there was no evidence of flight bookings to support the allegation that Corbett planned to return to Ireland.

=== Verdict and sentencing ===
Martens being led in shackles and handcuffs to a waiting van for transport to prison after being found guilty of the murder of Corbett (9 August 2017)

On 9 August 2017, after fewer than four hours of deliberation, Thomas, aged 67, and Martens, aged 33, were unanimously found guilty of the second‑degree murder of Corbett. Both received sentences of 20 to 25 years in prison, in line with the prosecution's recommendation.

A victim impact statement written by 13‑year‑old Jack was read to the court by District Attorney Martin. Jack wrote that losing his father nine years after his mother's death was extremely difficult, and that his father would now never see him grow up. Addressing Martens, Jack said she was not part of the Corbett family and never would be, and that she would be remembered as a murderer. Martens was observed to be visibly distressed as the statement was read, and several jurors were reported to have cried.

Media interviews with jurors later indicated they did not believe Corbett had attacked Martens, and that the number of blows inflicted ruled out self‑defence. One juror said Martens became emotional when evidence relating to the children was discussed but did not react similarly when viewing photographs of Corbett's body, and described her as "very manipulative". Corbett's sister later said she believed the motive for his death was his plan to return to Ireland without Martens, and that the incident had been staged to obtain custody of the children. Prosecutors also cited adoption issues and the life insurance policy as possible motives.

== Appeal ==
On 12 March 2021, the North Carolina Supreme Court ruled by a 4–3 majority that Martens and her father Thomas must be granted a new trial for the death of Corbett, stating that the North Carolina Court of Appeals was correct to quash their convictions on the basis that certain statements made by Corbett's children to investigating officers shortly after his death had been wrongly excluded from use by defence lawyers during the 2017 trial. In response, Jack and Sarah said they were willing to testify against the Martenses if their earlier statements were relied upon by the defence.

== Plea deal and sentencing hearing ==
On 30 October 2023, Martens and Thomas accepted plea bargains at the Davidson County Superior Court to charges of class D manslaughter, in return for the district attorney agreeing to drop murder charges against them. In early November 2023, Martens entered a no‑contest plea to voluntary manslaughter, while Thomas pleaded guilty to the same charge, and on 9 November 2023 both were sentenced to between 51 and 74 months in prison. Because of time already served, it was expected that both would serve an additional seven months before becoming eligible for release.

At the sentencing hearing, evidence was presented of Corbett's alleged verbal and physical abuse of Martens, including photographic and audio material. One news source summarised testimony from a domestic abuse expert called by the defence, who said Martens' primary concern had been retaining custody of Jack and Sarah. The expert said Martens believed she would lose the children if she divorced Corbett, and that his family in Ireland would take them if anything happened to him. The expert concluded that this gave Martens and Thomas little reason to want Corbett dead and every reason to use a reasonable amount of force. The judge remarked that he believed Martens had been a good mother to the Corbett children. Several character witnesses described Thomas as a family‑oriented person and a rule follower. In response to suggestions from the defence that Corbett might have killed his first wife, her family issued a statement rejecting the allegation, saying she had suffered from asthma throughout her life and that Corbett had done everything he could to help her during her fatal asthma attack.

"All we have ever wanted is real Justice for Jason as well as peace and closure for Jack and Sarah. No matter the sentencing, we want to set the record straight and let the world know what the truth is. We know how much Jason loved and adored our Mags. We hope the facts and truth will speak for themselves, and no amount of lies will tarnish the love Jason and Mags had for one another."

— Excerpt of statement released by Fitzpatrick family in response to insinuations that Jason had killed his first wife Mags Fitzpatrick (November 2023)

Jack, aged 19, and Sarah, aged 17, attended court to deliver their victim impact statements. Sarah said she had undergone years of therapy because her childhood statements had been misused and had helped the Martenses avoid punishment, and she said Martens had devastated her family. She also said Martens had shown no remorse for killing her father, removed her wedding ring soon afterwards, and told her to stop crying and "get over it". Jack asked the judge not to be misled by Martens, describing her as a "monster" who had abused him and used his earlier statements in an effort to avoid responsibility for killing his father. As the statements were read, Martens cried and eventually lowered her face onto the table in front of her.

== Release from prison ==
On 6 June 2024, Martens and her father Thomas were released from prison after completing their sentences for the voluntary manslaughter of Corbett. Both were placed under one year of post‑release supervision, reported to be served in Tennessee. In response to their release, former Davidson County Sheriff David Grice, who supervised the investigation into Corbett's death, said they had received "a slap on the wrist" and alleged they had "spent enough money on appeals until the courts got worn down and accepted their last appeal". Corbett's daughter Sarah also released a statement expressing disappointment, saying she was "confident they would have been found guilty" had a retrial taken place, "evident by their acceptance of the plea deal".

"Molly Martens relentlessly put Jack and Sarah into the centre of her bid to evade justice with a web of lies while refusing to take the stand to give evidence herself. Her cruelty disregard and treatment of two children under 10 years of age whose birth mother had died, father she had just battered to death and whom she professed to love was inhumane. Despite the gravity of their crime and the immense loss they inflicted, they will be freed today after serving just four years and three months."

— Excerpt of statement released by Corbett family in response to the Martens' release from prison (June 2024)

In the summer of 2026, Martens was reported to be living in Kingston, Tennessee and expecting her first child. In early October 2026, she gave birth to a boy, and a crowdfunding appeal was set up online to provide donations to Martens and the child's father.

== In popular culture ==
A Netflix documentary about Corbett's death, titled A Deadly American Marriage, was released on 9 May 2025. As well as featuring Corbett's children, both Martens and Thomas were interviewed for the programme. One scene shows Alan Martin, who was the assistant District Attorney of Davidson County, suggesting that on the night in question Martens attempted to stage a domestic incident with her parents as witnesses, with the aim of applying for a domestic violence protective order and then seeking emergency custody of Jack and Sarah.

A Deadly American Marriage was later nominated for the "Outstanding Crime & Justice Documentary" award at the 2026 Emmy Awards.

=== Viewership ===
According to data from Showlabs, A Deadly American Marriage ranked fourth on Netflix in the United States during the week of 12–18 May 2025.
