= Thomas S. Flood (politician) =

American politician

Thomas Schmeck Flood
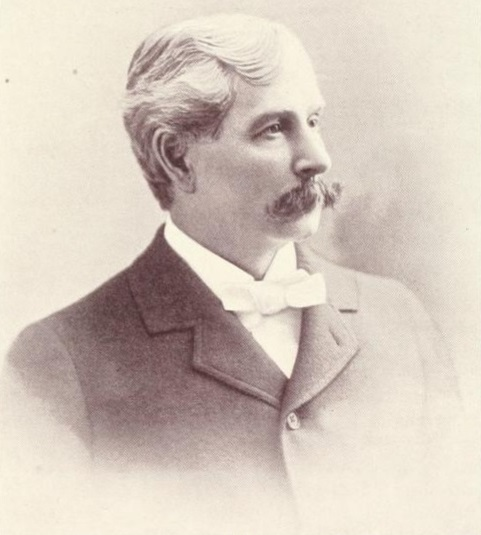
- Flood c. 1898

Member of the U.S. House of Representatives from New York's 28th district
- In office March 4, 1887 – March 3, 1891
- Preceded by: John Arnot, Jr.
- Succeeded by: Hosea H. Rockwell

Personal details
- Born: April 12, 1844 Lodi, New York
- Died: October 28, 1908 (aged 64) Pittsburgh, Pennsylvania
- Resting place: Woodlawn Cemetery
- Party: Republican

Thomas Schmeck Flood (April 12, 1844 – October 28, 1908) was a United States representative from New York.

Born in Lodi, New York, Flood attended the common schools and Elmira Free Academy. He studied medicine but did not practice, instead engaging in the drug business. He moved to Pennsylvania and founded the town of DuBois, then served as the town's first postmaster. After returning to New York, he settled in Elmira and served on the city's Board of Aldermen in 1882 and 1883. He engaged in agricultural pursuits and lumbering and was president of the Chemung County Agricultural Society in 1884 and 1885.

Flood was elected as a Republican to the Fiftieth and Fifty-first Congresses (March 4, 1887 – March 3, 1891). He served as chairman of the Committee on Expenditures on Public Buildings during the Fifty-first Congress. He was not a candidate for renomination in 1890.

Following his time as a Representative, Flood worked in the real estate business. He died on October 28, 1908, while visiting Pittsburgh, Pennsylvania, and was interred in Elmira's Woodlawn Cemetery.

U.S. House of Representatives
| Preceded by John Arnot, Jr. | Member of the U.S. House of Representatives from New York's 28th congressional district 1887 – 1891 | Succeeded by Hosea H. Rockwell |
