= Edward Banfield =

Edward Banfield may refer to:

- Edward Banfield (railroad engineer) (1837–1872), British railroad engineer in Argentina
- Edward C. Banfield (1916–1999), American political scientist
