= European Agreement on Au Pair Placement =

1969 Council of Europe treaty

- Signed: 24 November 1969
- Location: Strasbourg, France
- Effective: 30 May 1971

The European Agreement on Au Pair Placement is an international agreement within the Council of Europe, originally signed in Strasbourg, France on 24 November 1969. It came into force on 30 May 1971 and regulates au pair placements. It states that the placed person shall neither be seen as a traditional employed domestic worker nor as a traditional student.

== List ==
| Country | Signed | Ratification | Treaty into force | Denunciation | Denunciation into force | Other | Source |
|---|---|---|---|---|---|---|---|
| Belgium | 24 November 1969 | | | | | | |
| Bulgaria | 9 March 2002 | | | | | | |
| Denmark | 29 April 1971 | 29 April 1971 | 30 May 1971 | | | | |
| Finland | 17 June 1997 | | | | | | |
| France | 3 June 1970 | 5 February 1971 | 30 May 1971 | | | | |
| Germany | 2 October 1976 (as West Germany) | | | | | | |
| Greece | 22 August 1979 | | | | | | |
| Italy | 24 November 1969 | 8 November 1973 | 9 December 1973 | | | | |
| Luxembourg | 12 December 1969 | 24 July 1990 | 25 August 1990 | 23 September 2002 | 24 March 2003 | | |
| Moldova | 27 June 2001 | | | | | | |
| Norway | 29 April 1971 | 29 April 1971 | 30 May 1971 | | | | |
| Spain | 24 January 1986 | 11 August 1988 | 12 September 1988 | | | | |
| Switzerland | 18 March 1970 | | | | | | |

== See also ==
- List of Council of Europe treaties
