= Hosea H. Rockwell =

American politician

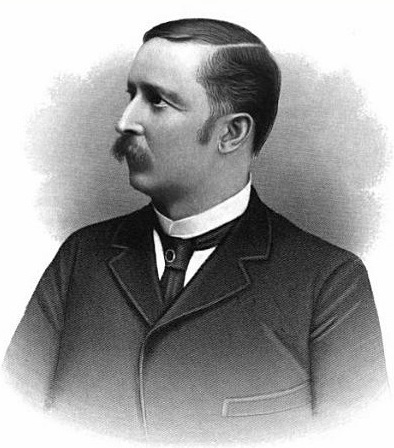
- Hosea H. Rockwell, c. 1892

Member of the New York State Assembly for Chemung County, New York
- In office January 1, 1877 – December 31, 1877
- Preceded by: Edmund Miller
- Succeeded by: George M. Baird

Member of the U.S. House of Representatives from New York's 28th district
- In office March 4, 1891 – March 3, 1893
- Preceded by: Thomas S. Flood
- Succeeded by: Sereno E. Payne

Personal details
- Born: Hosea Hunt Rockwell; May 31, 1840 Lawrenceville, Pennsylvania, United States
- Died: December 18, 1918 (aged 78) Elmira, New York, United States
- Resting place: Woodlawn Cemetery, Elmira, New York
- Party: Democratic Party

Hosea Hunt Rockwell (May 31, 1840 – December 18, 1918) was an American lawyer, American Civil War veteran, and politician who served one term in the United States House of Representatives from New York from 1891 to 1893.

== Biography ==
=== Early life ===
Born in Lawrenceville, Pennsylvania, Rockwell attended the common schools. During the American Civil War (1861–1865), he served in the Union Army as a private in the 23rd New York Infantry Regiment in 1861 and 1862. After the war, he studied law and was admitted to the bar in 1869. He commenced his legal practice in Elmira, New York.

=== Political career ===
Rockwell represented Chemung County in the New York State Assembly in the 100th New York State Legislature during 1877. He later served as city attorney of Elmira. He was elected as a Democrat to the 52nd United States Congress, holding office from March 4, 1891, to March 3, 1893. He did not stand for reelection, and resumed the practice of law in Elmira. He served as a delegate to the 1896 Democratic National Convention and as chairman of the Democratic State Convention in 1896.

=== Later life ===
Rockwell again returned to his law practice in Elmira. He died in Elmira on December 18, 1918, and was interred in Woodlawn Cemetery in Elmira.

== Sources ==
- United States Congress. "Hosea H. Rockwell (id: R000366)". Biographical Directory of the United States Congress.

New York State Assembly
Preceded by Edmund Miller	New York State Assembly; Chemung County; 1877	Succeeded by George M. Baird
U.S. House of Representatives
Preceded by Thomas S. Flood	Member of the U.S. House of Representatives from New York's 28th congressional district 1891–1893	Succeeded by Sereno E. Payne
