= David Banfield =

Canadian ice hockey official

David Banfield (born April 30, 1979 in Halifax, Nova Scotia) is an AHL and former NHL referee. Banfield began his NHL refereeing career on March 17, 2008 with the Colorado Avalanche at Minnesota Wild game. A member of the NHL Officials' Association from 2007 until 2012, Banfield refereed 74 games at the NHL level.

He has not officiated NHL matches since the 2011-12 season, but he continues to work AHL matches.
