= Au pair =

Helper from a foreign country working for, and living as part of, a host family

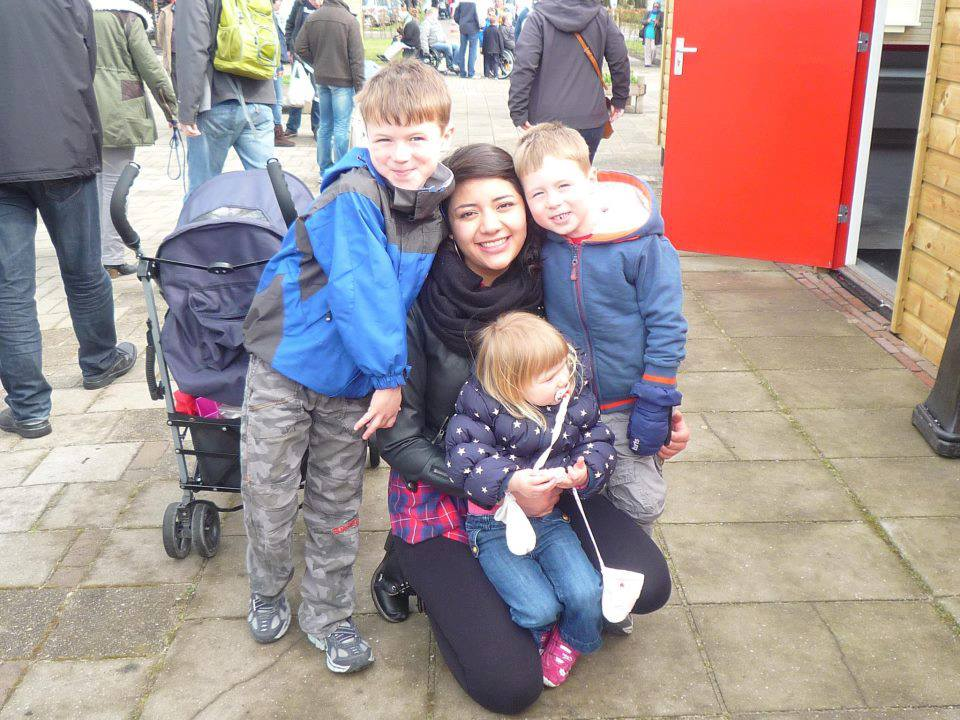
Dutch children cared for by an Ecuadorian au pair

An au pair (/oʊˈpɛr/; pl.: au pairs) is a person working for, and living as part of, a host family. Typically, au pairs take on a share of the family’s responsibility for child care as well as some housework, and receive a monetary allowance or stipend for personal use. Au pair arrangements are often subject to government restrictions which specify an age range usually from mid teens to late twenties, and may explicitly limit the arrangement to females. The au pair program is considered a form of cultural exchange that gives the family and the au pairs a chance to experience and learn new cultures.

Arrangements differ between Europe, where the concept originated, and North America. In Europe, au pairs are only supposed to work part-time, and they often also study part-time, generally focusing on the language of the host country. In the United States, they may provide full-time childcare. In 1969, the European Agreement on Au Pair Placement was signed, and it came into force in 1971. Au pair companies in the United States have significant non-refundable fees once the au pair arrives in the country. The contract does not guarantee childcare, despite many families' reliance on the program.

Unlike many other types of domestic assistants, the au pair is considered a part of the host family and not merely an employee. In some countries the au pair wears a uniform, but more commonly the au pair only follows the host family's dress code and wears attire appropriate for the work description, typically including a protective apron.

== History ==
The title comes from the French term au pair, meaning 'on par' or 'equal to', indicating that the relationship is intended to be one of equals: the au pair is intended to become a member of the family, albeit a temporary one, rather than a traditional domestic worker.

The term was historically used in a broad sense to indicate economic parity between the 'employer' and their 'employee'. Thus it is found used in 1840 by Honoré de Balzac:

Sylvie Rogron fut envoyée à cent écus de pension en apprentissage. ... Deux ans après, elle était au pair : si elle ne gagnait rien, ses parents ne payaient plus rien pour son logis et sa nourriture.

Sylvie Rogron was sent out to an apprenticeship at an annual cost of one hundred écus. ... After two years, she was 'at par': if she didn't earn anything, her parents no longer paid anything for her room and board.

— Honoré de Balzac, Pierrette

== Concept and conditions ==
The concept of the au pair originated in Europe after World War II. Before the war, an abundant supply of domestic servants had been available to look after the children of middle and upper-class families, but changes in social attitudes, and increases in wages and taxes after the war, made the old system inaccessible to most middle-class parents. At the same time, social change increased the number of middle-class girls who needed to earn their own living, and rising educational aspirations for girls made experiencing foreign cultures and learning foreign languages more common aspirations.

However, due to the stigma attached to being a "servant", an essentially working-class status that even working-class people were repudiating, this potential supply for domestic labour could only be utilised if a new non-servant role was created. Thus the au pair was born. The au pair was supposed to be treated as a member of the family rather than a servant, and was not required to wear a uniform.

An au pair receives an allowance and their own room. The usual practice is that au pairs eat with the family most of the time, and join in some of the usual family activities such as outings and trips. However, host families ordinarily expect to have some private time to themselves, particularly in the evenings. During this time, an au pair might retire to their room to watch television, study, or go out with friends. Provision is often made for the au pair to have time for studying, especially the language of the host country. The Council of Europe recommends that au pairs be issued standard contracts with their family.

Some au pairs are now male, but females remain the overwhelming majority. Many governments impose limits as to how many hours an au pair is allowed to work. Tasks can include taking children to and from school, taking children to after-school activities, cooking, cleaning, ironing, tidying up and babysitting. Each placement varies depending on the host family.

In many developing countries, an abundant supply of local domestic labour is still available, so there is little or no demand for au pairs.

Au pair relationships between host families and au pairs can be established through various means. Traditionally, au pair agencies located in a given host country have served as an intermediary between young people seeking to become au pairs and families in the country that are interested in hosting an au pair. Such agencies typically charge a fee to the host family for fulfilling an intermediary role between the host family and possible au pairs. The agency conducts some process of screening and evaluation of prospective au pairs and then proposes possible au pairs to the host families, who are their principal customers. Traditional agencies also assist with the arrangement of some of the bureaucratic formalities associated with an au pair visit.

In recent years, the basic function of bringing aspiring au pairs and interested host families together has increasingly been provided by websites that allow families and au pairs to post online profiles and search for each other directly on the basis of the information provided in these profiles. Such websites supplement this search functionality with various information offerings about au pair requirements in different countries as well as by providing user support for their registered users. Charges are made to users of such websites to allow a full exchange of the personal contact details necessary for finalizing an au pair placement.

This approach typically gives prospective au pairs and host families a wider range of choices and more direct control over the selection process than is possible through a traditional agency at a considerably lower price than traditional agencies charge. At the same time, use of such websites requires an aspiring host family or au pair to invest more personal effort in the search process and to make their selection and arrange the formalities of an au pair stay without the involvement of a third party.

== Asia-Pacific ==
=== Australia ===
Australia has no official au pair program through the government. Visas that can be used by au pairs are the Working Holiday and Work and Holiday Visa, which both provide working rights. Students, especially those who study English, often become demi-pairs to immerse themselves in the language and culture of Australia. Au pair arrangements in Australia and work hours vary from 10 to 40 hours per week.

The Cultural Au Pair Association of Australia ("CAPAA") Cultural Au Pair Association of Australia was formed in 2012 on a not-for-profit basis and is the only approved Australian association member of the international Au Pair Association IAPA. CAPAA is an industry-based association, with the purpose of protecting and developing the au pair experience as a rewarding cultural exchange programme. Member agencies agree to abide by the code of conduct developed by the International Au Pair Association and CAPAA. CAPAA's members also agree to meet strict business and ethical standards to ensure competence, fair dealing and high integrity.

The Australian Au-Pair Families Association is a not-for-profit organisation and members are Australian host families. In comparison to CAPAA, it supports self-regulation in the Au pair industry, and provides information and guidance to Au-Pair families based on international hosting standards and ethics.

Those wanting to come to Australia will need a working holiday visa (417) or a Work & Holiday visa (462) to Au pair.

=== China ===
Au pair agencies in China sent young Chinese to Western nations to work as au pairs abroad, particularly for families who had adopted babies from China, to help them learn Chinese. In addition, China's rising middle class and economic growth have led to a growing demand for au pairs. This helps create opportunities to learn English at an early age, as well as the opportunity for mothers to return to work and have additional help in raising the children. However, the main goal for most families hiring au pairs is primarily to help their children as well as themselves learn English, as the mother has the biggest role in raising the children.

To be an au pair in China, participants need to apply for an X or an F visa. The first one is required for internships, studies and long term courses. The F visa entitles a person to live in China to take part in a cultural exchange, study tours or language courses.

=== New Zealand ===
Au pairs are required to obtain a NZ Working Holiday Visa. Prospective au pairs can find host families directly or via an agency. Agencies can require at least 200 hours childcare experience prior to making an application, as well as police and medical background checks that are additional to those required of all au pairs in the visa process. New Zealand au pair agencies seek to safeguard both au pair and host family well-being. Most New Zealand au pair agencies are members of the International Au Pair Association and will also require au pairs to implement the early childhood education curriculum, Te Whāriki.

=== Turkey ===
Turkey is a transcontinental country that spans Europe and Asia; thus Turkish culture is heterogeneous and diversified. As culture and aspirations of this multi-ethnic country have recently turned to Europe, where the Au Pair Programs are especially popular, Turkey may be considered one of the most popular non-EU country among the Au Pairs.

One of the biggest obstacles towards becoming centre of the Au Pairs' community is the visa requirement for foreigners. Entering Turkey without a valid visa is impossible for Au Pairs – and to apply for a visa any potential Au Pair needs both an Au Pair contract and an invitation letter, what significantly reduces the number of people willing to make an effort and go through such a complicated application process.

== Europe ==
=== Austria ===
The tradition of au pairing is well established in Austria, and prospective au pairs are served by several agencies that are accustomed to dealing with direct applications from foreigners. Agencies often charge their au pairs a fee equivalent to a week's pocket money and will tell the au pair where to take the documents to be stamped for a fee.

Officially, au pairs from outside Europe must obtain both a work and residence permit (Beschäftigungsbewilligung). The employing family should apply at their local employment office at least two weeks before the start date. Before the permit can be approved and an Anzeigebestätigung issued, the authorities must see an agreement or contract (signed by the employer and the au pair) and proof that health and accident insurance cover has been obtained by the au pair.

=== Belgium ===
In Belgium, au pairs must take part in a Dutch, French, or German language course (according to the region) offered by an officially recognised institution – private tuition, distance learning courses, or private school courses are not accepted. An au pair without a basic knowledge of the host country's language will have to attend an intensive language course upon arriving in Belgium. The host family will also prepare a cultural programme.

Nationals of all countries (except the States of the European Union, Iceland, Monaco, Norway, Liechtenstein and Switzerland) who want to stay more than three months in Belgium are subject to the visa/work permit requirement. Non-EU members who want to work as an au pair in Belgium must be in possession of:

- a passport valid for at least one year
- a recent certificate of good conduct covering the last five years
- a medical certificate obtained from a doctor approved by the Embassy
- an employment authorization, which must be requested by the Belgian host family and issued along with the work permit B.
- The application must be submitted in time to allow for a possible investigation by the Foreign Office.

Providing childcare is the main responsibility of an au pair, though the host family may also request some light housework. All tasks are defined in the official au pair contract and cannot be changed by the au pair or the host family. The au pair receives free board and lodging, and is entitled to food and accommodation in cases of illness and holidays. She also has her own bedroom and key to the house. The host family subscribes to health and accident insurance, as well as an insurance for potential repatriation costs for the au pair.

In Belgium, an au pair is entitled to at least 450 euros pocket money per month, deposited to her bank account. The au pair is entitled to the full amount of monthly pocket money in cases of illness and during holidays. Au pairs are not allowed to work more than 4 hours per day (babysitting hours included) and 20 hours per week, spread out over a maximum of 6 days per week. Au pairs are entitled to at least one day off per week and at least one whole weekend per month. Holiday entitlement is not regulated in Belgium, but it is recommended that an au pair receives a minimum of 2 weeks' holiday.

=== Denmark ===
In Denmark, an au pair must be between 18 and 30 years old, must be able to master at least one of the following languages: English, German, Danish, Swedish or Norwegian. The daily working schedule must be at least 3 and a maximum of 5 hours, that is between 18 and 30 hours a week. The au pair must have at least one and a half days off a week.

The au pair is to be regarded as a family member that means being equal to the other family members and participating in the everyday life of the host family. In return for her/his work, the au pair receives board and lodging, pocket money (from 4,550 DKK 2021 level) and access to follow language courses at language schools.

The au pair usually are allowed to stay with their host family maximum period of 24 months, but no longer than stated in the contract. Though, the au pair visa does not constitute the grounds for a settlement either work permit.

The host family is responsible for the entry and return ticket to/from Denmark if the au pair comes from a country outside the EU / EEA or Switzerland. In addition, the host family is responsible for a one-time fee, which is intended to cover part of the state's expenses for the Danish language lessons.

=== Finland ===
An au pair's responsibilities also include light domestic work for a maximum of 25 hours per week. The au pair must have at least one full free day every week, and two successive free days at least every second week. The au pair has her/his own room, is provided with food, and is paid a weekly allowance amounting to at least €280 per month (minimum set by Finnish law). Additionally, the host family will arrange a Finnish or Swedish language course to help the au pair communicate better with the children and get more out of their stay in Finland. Au pairs can stay with their host family for up to one year or negotiate a shorter stay. Anyone, except citizens of the Nordic countries or the EU/EEA countries, wishing to work in Finland as an au pair must apply for and receive a residence permit before entering Finland. Citizens of EU states, Iceland, Norway, Liechtenstein or Switzerland must register their right to reside in Finland, but they do not need a residence permit.

=== France ===
Au pairing has long been a favored way for young women to learn French and, increasingly, for young men as well. The pocket money for au pairs in France is 60 euro per week, plus, in most cases, a 20 euro a week contribution to language classes; in Paris families may also provide a carte Navigo (urban travel pass) which is worth 95 euros (approximately). Enrollment in a French language course is compulsory for non-European au pairs.

A 1993 guidebook to living and working in Paris, had the following to say about au pair work in the city:

This system permits a person, male or female, aged at least 18yrs and not more than 30yrs, to work in a French family for 30 hours a week plus 2 nights a week 'babysitting' in exchange for accommodation, food, pocket money (1.800frs per month) and "carte orange" (201frs). The au pair is required to attend French language classes in order to make it possible for the employer to declare her/him for health insurance.

While France does not have an official, government sponsored Au Pair Program, a number of established agencies belong to UFAAP, the Union Francaise des Associations Au Pair, an umbrella group set up in 1999, based at Europair Services in Paris. As such, many au pairs enter France using a student visa where au pairs are limited to working no more than 5 hours a day, 30 hours a week, and pay is generally between 250 and 300 Euros.

Application criteria

Potential au pairs must:

- Be aged 17–27.
- Have basic skills in French.
- Be able to commit to a period of at least 10 months (most host families prefer Au Pairs who can stay for the school year from September to June).
- Attend French language classes while in France (this is a requirement to obtain the Long-Stay Au Pair Visa).

=== Germany ===
Many independent agents are members of the Au Pair Society which has two offices in Germany and more than 40 members. The Society's website carries contact details for its members with links to agency websites. Commercial au pair agencies do not charge a placement fee to incoming au pairs.

The Au-Pair Society e.V. is a member of the International Au Pair Association and is also in a committee ECAPS (European Committee for Au-Pair Standards) where members of National Organisation from several European countries have defined new Standards for Au-Pair program in Europe.

Non-EU citizens no older than 24 can become au pairs through a German agency. Americans and Canadians do not need to apply for a residence and work permit before leaving their home countries; however, it is a general requirement that au pairs prove that they have studied German.

As per Au Pair Wave agency, the monthly pocket money for an au pair in Germany was raised to 280 euros ($300+) in 2023. The majority of families also give their au pairs a monthly travel pass and other benefits such as a contribution to course fees or travel expenses.

Application criteria

According to general agency guidelines, including those followed by organizations such as My Family Au Pair, candidates wishing to become au pairs in Germany typically must meet the following criteria:

- Age: Between 18 and 26 years old.
- Language Skills: Basic knowledge of German (at least A1 level).
- Marital Status: Unmarried and without children.
- Be able to commit to a period of 3 to 12 months.

These criteria are intended to ensure that participants can adapt to host family life and benefit from the cultural exchange aspect of the program.

=== Italy ===
In order to become an Au Pair in Italy, Au Pairs need to:

- Be between 18 and 30 years old
- Have a good command in Italian or English
- Be entitled to a visa if they do not belong to any EU-country. In this case, the Italian embassy placed at the Au Pair's home country will decide to approve or deny the Au Pair's application.

The Au Pair program in Italy establishes that:

- Au Pairs will work a maximum of 30 hours per week
- Au Pairs will have 4 weeks paid holiday for a 12-months stay
- Au Pairs will have at least one day off per week
- Au Pairs will earn a monthly amount of 260 euro
- Au Pairs will pay for the travel expenses to the Host Family's country

Additional information:

- Au Pairs who belong to a non-EU country member will have to apply for a visa. For that, visa requirements must be fulfilled and documents must be provided to the Italian embassy placed in their home country
- Au Pairs from a non-EU country will need to close a private insurance from their home country
- Au Pairs who come from any EU-country can apply for the European Health Insurance Card

It is possible to apply independently through an Italian agency. There are many opportunities for au pairs during the summer holidays, when most Italians who can afford au pairs migrate to the coast or the mountains and take their helpers with them. The weekly pocket money is 75–95 euro for working 30 hours a week, and 100–130 euro for 40 hours, though many families in larger cities pay more than this.

Non-European nationals are not eligible for a Permesso di Soggiorno (stay permit) unless they arrive with the appropriate visa from the Italian embassy in their country. The best route is to obtain a student visa which permits the holder to work up to 20 hours per week (live-in or live-out). To obtain a long-stay visa, non-EU au pairs will need to enroll in and pay for an Italian language course at an approved school or college. The school registrar will issue a certificate which must then be stamped by the local police office (Questura). The visa will be valid only for the length of the course. The applicant must show sufficient insurance coverage, a return air ticket, proof of accommodation stamped by the police and a contract specifying dates, pocket money and benefits stamped by the provincial labor office and/or the police.

American citizens cannot legally work as au pairs on a working visa; the nulla osta will be denied because there are no labor agreements between the US and Italy in regards to au pairs. If the applicant is already in Italy she can check classified adverts in English language journals, many of which are published online such as Wanted in Rome aimed at the expatriate community, and notice boards in English language bookshops, English-speaking churches, student travel agencies, and language school notice boards.

=== Netherlands ===
Au pairs may only be placed with a host family in the Netherlands through an au pair agency recognized by the Immigration and Naturalisation Service (IND) of the Netherlands. Interested au pair candidates must be older than 18 but not yet 31 and interested in learning about Dutch society and culture.

If you are an EU citizen, you do not need a visa to work as an au pair in the Netherlands. After you have been in the Netherlands for three months, you must register with the IND. When you register, you must provide documents to verify the purpose of your stay. After registering, you will receive proof of registration in the form of a sticker, which will be attached to your passport (or other proof of identity).

As a Dutch national host family, if you wish to bring an au pair to the Netherlands for longer than three months, you must meet the following conditions:

- Your family must consist of a minimum of 2 persons
- You must support the au pair during their stay in the Netherlands
- Au pair is registered in the Municipal Personal Records Database (BRP)
- Your family must have sufficient income to support the au pair and yourselves
- Family must publish a daily schedule of duties

The au pair must have the following documents and meet the following conditions:

- A valid passport
- Health insurance that covers the au pair in the Netherlands
- Cannot be married
- Cannot have dependents or be responsible for the care of their family members
- They do not constitute a risk to the public order
- They must undergo a tuberculosis test in the Netherlands
- They are over 18 but not older than 25
- They have not previously stayed in the Netherlands on a residence permit
- They did not previously work for your family abroad
- They will only carry out light domestic work to assist your family
- They will work a maximum of 8 hours per day and a maximum of 30 hours per week; you will have 2 days off per week

Placement period

An au pair in the Netherlands is allowed to stay for a maximum of one year.

Duties

Providing childcare and doing light household chores are the main responsibilities. A daily schedule of duties is drawn up by the host family.

Pocket money

In the Netherlands, an au pair receives 300–340 euros pocket money per month.

Board and lodging

An au pair receives free board and lodging, and is entitled to board and lodging in cases of illness and holidays.

Working hours

In the Netherlands, the weekly working schedule of an au pair must not exceed a total of 30 hours. They may never work more than 8 hours a day or more than 5 days per week. Additional babysitting for the host family or taking on a job on the side is also not allowed.

Free time

An au pair in the Netherlands is entitled to a minimum of two days off per week; however, these days do not have to be consecutive.

Holiday

An au pair in the Netherlands is entitled to a minimum of 2 weeks paid holiday per 12 months. They and the host family can take this value as a basis for calculating the amount of holiday in case of a shorter placement.

Language course/cultural exchange

An au pair is entitled to attend a language course. The host family assists in finding suitable offers within their area, and contributes 320 euros per year to a language course. The au pair programme in the Netherlands is explicitly designed for a cultural exchange. Therefore, the host family will help the au pair to experience Dutch culture through various cultural activities.

=== Norway ===
As of the autumn of 2022, the authorities were scheduled to abolish the possibility for working as au pair in Norway; however in November 2022, one lawyer who has had many au pairs as clients, said that she has not seen any indication of that. Furthermore, media said that there are now 846 [legally working as au pairs, or] permits for au pairs; furthermore, if an au pair changes employee - the government's "au pair fee" (Norwegian kroner 9,100) has to be paid again.

The number of au pairs in Norway have more than quadrupled between 2000 and 2014. 81 percent of au pairs were females from the Philippines. In 2015, there were around 3000 au pairs in Norway. To compare, in 2000, there were 691 au pairs with the permit to stay in Norway.

==== Rights and regulations ====
As of April 2019, the host family is required to pay the au pair a minimum of NOK 5900 per month (pre-tax) as pocket money/salary. Since the au pair programme is a cultural exchange programme, the au pair also has the right to attend courses in Norwegian. The host family must provide a minimum of NOK 8850 pre-tax for the au pair's Norwegian lessons and study materials. The au pair's additional rights include, among other things: free board and lodging; holiday pay in accordance with the Holidays Act; and one full day (24 hours) off per week. The au pair is required to pay taxes. According to regulations [as of 2016] "the period of work shall normally not exceed five hours per day, and the maximum shall be 30 hours a week".

If a host family fails to follow the regulations, they can lose the right to have an au pair for one, two, or five years, according to a rule introduced in July 2013. If the host family commits an offense punishable by three months in prison or more, the host family quarantine could last up to 10 years.

==== Controversies regarding the au pair system ====
The au pair system has, in recent years, been a topic of dispute in the Norwegian public. According to lawyer Lene Løvdal, "The au pair scheme is all about cheap in-house female work force. The majority of the au pairs in Norway do not primarily come here for the cultural exchange. First and foremost they’re professional housemaids." In 2013, the Norwegian newspaper Dagbladet reported that au pairs in Norway occasionally show up at PTA meetings, in the place of children's parents.

A documentary about au pairs in Norway, Herskap og tenarar ("masters and Servants"), was broadcast on the TV channel NRK in 2013. The documentary examines the rights of au pairs in Norway, and focuses particularly on recent cases of abuse and exploitation against some au pairs from the Philippines.

In 2016 the government cancelled funding for Au-pair senteret (over the state budget); in a Dagsavisen article Kadra Yusuf said that "We have become a class-divided society and we have servants. ... and the responsibility that goes along. The first step must be that the government keeps the au-pair center open. That, the masters (or the master race) can afford, or what?"

In 2020, 45 persons were temporarily banned from employing au pairs; the family [or household] of those persons, can not employ au pairs for a determinate number of years; in the previous year, 9 persons received temporary bans.

==== 2020 conviction of four employers ====
In 2020, a billionaire and his wife were each sentenced to 75 days in prison, and proceeds of the crime were confiscated: Norwegian kroner 186,000; their friends, a married couple, received a suspended prison sentence: 30 days for one, and 18 days for the wife. Previously, in the lower court system, a trial was scheduled from 3 January 2017 until 18 January, with all four found guilty later in 2017. The four persons were charged with wrongfully having claimed: that they only had one au pair; that the au pair was to participate in Norwegian language courses; and that the person would not be working as a housekeeper. In addition, all are charged with having violated Utlendingsloven ("foreigners act"): one count is in regard to trafficking of the type that is punishable for up to three years.

=== Spain ===
The minimum pocket money for au pairs is 70 euros a week. There are also opportunities for young people to stay with Spanish families in exchange for speaking English with the children without having any domestic or childcare duties.

According to the Spanish Ministry of Foreign Affairs, the holder of an au pair visa must be between 17 and 30 years of age. They have the following rights, among others:

1. Duration of the agreement, not longer than one year.
2. Participation in household chores and duties, not more than 5 hours daily.
3. Minimum of one complete free day a week. For the student "Au Pair" to attend to religious activities, one free day a month must be a Sunday.
4. Exact address where the student "Au Pair" will be residing with the host family, enjoying at the same time a certain degree of independence.
5. Determined monthly pocket money that the student "Au Pair" will receive.
6. Conditions that would allow either party to reject the Placement Agreement with an advance notice of two weeks.

The Embassy requires both an offer of employment from the family, and a letter from an authorized educational institution in Spain, confirming the au pair's enrollment in a full-time course. The au pair must also provide "proof of economic means to cover living expenses and eventual return to the country of origin.

=== Sweden ===
There is no need for an agency in order to become an au pair in Sweden. Au pairs need to be between 18 and 30, have a valid passport, and not have any children. The Swedish Migration Authorities require that the applicant has a definite interest in learning or using the Swedish language. They are also required to have a certificate of admission to a Swedish course at time of application. Au pairs should not work for more than 25 hours a week, and combined with studies cannot exceed 40 hours a week. The required monthly allowance is SEK 5880 before tax at minimum.

As for tasks and rights, the official Swedish Migration Agency states that an au pair "lives temporarily with a host family and receives compensation for helping with childcare and light housework. The purpose of the person’s stay in Sweden is to improve their language skills and experience Swedish culture."

=== Switzerland ===
The applicant must be a female between the ages of 17 (18 in Geneva) and 29 from Western Europe, North America, Australia, or New Zealand, stay for a minimum of one year and a maximum of 18 months, and attend a minimum of three hours a week of language classes in Zürich, four in Geneva. Families in most places are required to pay half the language school fees of 500–1,000 Swiss francs for six months.

Au pairs in Switzerland work for a maximum of 30 hours per week, plus babysitting once or twice a week. The monthly salary varies among cantons but the normal range is 590–740 Swiss francs after all deductions for tax and health insurance have been made.

=== United Kingdom ===
Until Brexit au pairs mainly came to the UK from the European Economic Area under European freedom of movement regulations.

Historically, au pairs came to the UK under an Au Pair immigration category, which was closed in November 2008 Home Office when a new points-based system was introduced, which included a Youth Mobility Scheme under tier 5 of the points based system Youth Mobility Scheme for the nationals of Australia, Canada, Japan, New Zealand and Monaco.

While au pairs are not classified as regular workers in the UK, they may be required to pay income tax and National Insurance depending on the wages received: they are entitled to the UK minimum wage.

Unlike the requirements of other countries, au pairs are not required to attend a language course in the UK. Should the au pair want to enroll in a course, they are responsible for the cost. Though it is recommended that the host family assist in finding a suitable course.

In the UK, there are many au pair agencies that provide assistance to families looking to engage au pairs. These agencies are all privately owned and are not regulated by the UK government.

== North America ==
=== Canada ===
Au pair programs do not exist in Canada in the same format as the rest of the world. The Canadian government has the live-in caregiver program, which has broader requirements than the au pair program. Standard qualifications are regulated federally, though conditions of employment are determined at a provincial level. Requirements include a minimum of six months of training or one year of compatible employment within the past three years, though exceptions and additional stipulations do apply. Such regulations and complicating bureaucratic procedures are the driving force behind the creation of live-in caregiver (or nanny) placement agencies, who act as a mediator between families, caregivers, and the government - providing support for documentation and advice on the program.

=== United States ===
Interest in the Au Pair Program in the United States picked up in 1987, when two educational and cultural exchange agencies were designated by the United States Information Agency (USIA) to conduct a program under the Fulbright–Hays Act of 1961. This would allow foreign nationals the opportunity to live with an American host family and participate directly in the home life of the host family. After testing the program with approximately 200 au pairs, Congress instructed that the program be continued. The Au Pair Program was officially enacted in 1989. In that same year, the program was expanded to include four additional agencies, and these agencies together became the original six government designated Au pair organizations in the United States.

The United States au pair program offers qualified young people the opportunity to live and study in the U.S. for one or two years in exchange for providing up to 45 hours of childcare per week and no more than 10 hours a day. In 2006, the au pair program was also granted permission from the U.S. Department of State to offer a second year extension au pair program (6, 9 or 12 months), as well as a summer au pair program which was later discontinued.

At the same time, the au pairs are required to complete an educational component of six semester hours of academic credit or its equivalent. Au pairs are provided with up to $500 toward the cost of the required academic course work by their host families. At the end of one year, au pairs generally return to their home country, unless they and their host families choose to extend their stay for a further 6, 9, or 12 months. Alternatively, the au pair can choose to extend their period in the US with a different family. Most au pairs choose a family in a different part of the country, allowing them to have a new and different experience.

In the US, au pairs are provided a private bedroom, meals, some benefits agreed upon between the au pair and the host family, and a compensation tied to the minimum wage ($195.75 per week as of 24 July 2009), 1.5 days off weekly plus a full weekend off each month, two weeks' paid vacation, and the first $500 toward the costs of required course work to be completed at an accredited institution of higher education in order to satisfy the requirements of the educational component of the program. Au pairs are not to work more than 10 hours per day and no more than 45 hours per week, and are not to serve as general housekeepers or assume responsibility for household management.

The US EduCare Au Pair Program is also available for families with school-age children. In this program, the au pair works a lower number of hours (not more than 10 hours a day and not more than 30 hours a week) for a weekly minimum wage of $146.81, as of 2009. The family pays $1000 in educational expenses, and the au pair is required to complete 12 hours of academic credit.

Au pairs placed with families who have children under two years old must have at least 200 hours of child care experience with infants under two. Au pairs may only be placed in a family with an infant under three months old if a parent or other adult caregiver is also home and fully responsible for the infant.

The Au Pair Program is administered by the US Department of State. Participating families and au pairs must work with one of the approved agencies. Au pairs enter the United States on a J-1 visa. Some au pairs also use a tourist visa, which is illegal, since this document does not enable them to work in the USA.

According to the Internal Revenue Service, an au pair will almost always be a nonresident alien, and will be required to file a tax return on Form 1040NR or Form 1040NR-EZ to report their au pair wages. These wages, however, are not usually subject to social security and Medicare taxes because of the au pair's status as a J-1 nonimmigrant and as a nonresident alien. However, if the au pair had previously been in the United States as a student, teacher, trainee, or researcher in F, J, M, or Q nonimmigrant status, then the au pair might be a resident alien during their current stay in the United States, and might be subject to social security and Medicare taxes if their annual au pair wages exceed the applicable dollar threshold found in IRS Publication 926. If the au pair is a resident alien and their annual au pair wages exceed the applicable dollar threshold, then the host family must withhold social security and Medicare taxes and report them on Schedule H of Form 1040 and on Form W-2. The host family must apply for an Employer Identification Number (EIN) if it is required to withhold tax and file Form W-2.

==== Basic application criteria ====
Potential au pairs must be aged 18–26 (at the time of arrival) and have no criminal record.

Unless the au pair is in a federally funded exchange program, sponsor organizations charge participants program fees. Fees vary from sponsor to sponsor based on the exchange category, the sponsor's program, program duration, etc.

==== Au pair program types in the United States ====
Au pairs in the United States are categorized by program types. Most au pair organizations in the United States classify au pairs by the following programs:

Standard Au Pair Program

The Standard Au Pair program is the most popular program available. Standard au pairs can work up to 45 hours per week and no more than 10 hours per day. They are paid the standard stipend amount and fulfill the minimum educational requirement of 6 hours of academic credit or its equivalent during the program year. Families hosting standard au pairs are required to provide (up to) the first $500 toward the cost of the au pair's academic course work. Standard au pairs are usually available for a full year commitment and have a variety of qualifications. If a family has a child under the age of two, the au pair has to have at least 200 hours of experience. The minimum stipend for an Au Pair is U$195.75 per week, being U$4.35/hour.

Professional Au Pair Program

The Professional Au Pair program is for families who need more than just a babysitter and have higher child care needs, due to a new baby, multiple children or children with special needs. Professional au pairs have degrees in child care related fields such as pre-school teacher, pediatric nursing or occupational therapy for children or one or two years full-time experience with children. A professional au pair can work up to 45 hours per week and no more than 10 hours per day. They are often paid a higher stipend amount and fulfill the minimum educational requirement of 6 hours of academic credit or its equivalent during the program year. Families hosting professional au pairs are required to provide (up to) the first $500 toward the cost of the au pair's academic course work. Professional au pairs are usually available for a full year commitment and have a variety of qualifications. Cost are typically higher for a special needs au pair. Numerous agencies offer professional Au Pair programs including Au Pair International and PROaupair.

The Educare Program

The Educare Program was created as an option for families with school aged children or families looking for part-time child care. According to the U.S. Department of State, the Educare Au Pair Program applies to families who require childcare before and after school and may not be placed with families that have preschool aged children except if other, full-time childcare plans have been made.

Educare au pairs may work no more than 10 hours per day, and a maximum of 30 hours per week. Au Pairs participating in the Educare component receive 75 percent of the weekly rate paid to non-Educare participants. Educare au pairs must complete a minimum of 12 hours of academic credit or its equivalent during their program year. The host family is required to provide (up to) the first $1,000 toward the cost of the au pair's required academic course work.

The Extension Program

When the Au Pair Program started in the United States in 1989, au pairs were only allowed to stay in the country and work as au pairs for a 12-month period. In 2006, the U.S. Department of State allowed au pairs to legally extend their stay and work for 6, 9, or 12 additional months.

The program's regulations state that the Department of State may approve extensions for the au pair participants. The request for an extension beyond the maximum duration of the initial 12-month program must be submitted electronically to the Department of Homeland Security's Student and Exchange Visitor Information System (SEVIS) no less than 30 calendar days prior to the expiration of the exchange visitor's initial authorized stay in any program.

During your extension period you will not be allowed to leave the country, i.e. during your extension period you will have to stay within the country where you are doing the exchange and you will not travel to your home country or other countries because the stay for the second year is through another legal document and the J1 visa will not remain valid.

Repeat participation

In 2008, the U.S. Department of State re-designated the au pair requirements and regulations and added a repeat participation clause that states a foreign national who enters the United States as an au pair exchange visitor program participant and who has successfully completed their program is eligible to participate again as an au pair participant, provided that they have resided outside the United States for at least two years following completion of their initial au pair program.

The Au Pair Abroad Program (The Reciprocity Clause)

With the creation of the Au Pair Program in the United States in 1989, the U.S. Department of State also added a reciprocity clause in the general program requirements which states that in the conduct of their exchange programs, official au pair sponsor agencies shall make a good faith effort to achieve the fullest possible reciprocity in the exchange of persons.

Reciprocity means the participation of a US citizen in an educational and cultural program in a foreign country in exchange for the participation of a foreign national in the exchange visitor program. "Reciprocity" is interpreted broadly here; unless otherwise specified, reciprocity does not require a one-for-one exchange or that exchange visitors be engaged in the same activity. For example, exchange visitors coming to the United States for training in American banking practices and Americans going abroad to teach foreign nationals public administration would be considered a reciprocal exchange, when arranged or facilitated by the same sponsor.

The Au Pair Summer Program (discontinued)

The Au Pair Summer Program started in 2005, when the U.S. Department of State ran a three-year pilot program. The program was extended for an additional year before it was discontinued in 2009. The Au Pair Summer Program faced logistical complications with DS-2019 forms, visa approvals around the world and lack of interest from American host families in this particular program. Summer au pairs were exactly like standard au pairs, except their visas were granted for only a few months instead of a full year. Since 2009, none of the U.S. Department of State sponsor agencies are allowed to offer this program for families in the United States.

==== Sponsoring au pair agencies in the United States ====
As of August 2019, the U.S. State Department listed fifteen designated sponsoring au pair agencies. Host families typically pay these agencies an application fee and a program fee which varies from $7,500 to $10,500, depending on the agency used. The program fees cover expenses related to the arrival of the au pair and compliance with regulations governing the program. These include airfare, medical insurance, mandatory 32-hour education session on child development and safety and other expenses. Au pairs pay fees which vary depending on the US agency and the home country agency they use (if they do not apply directly to the US agency).

Au Pair online profile

An online profile is one of the most important steps for any au pair searching for a family. Families using the profile to get to know the au pair before scheduling an interview. It is therefore crucial that au pairs have a professional profile that is accessible at all times with a fully working contact form. Typically, an Au Pair online profile includes a candidate's personal and contact data, information on their professional background, skills, lifestyle habits, and work-related preferences. Au pairs need to be aware that having private information publicly available could be dangerous. It is therefore important to have a private working email.

==== Chinese au pairs in the US ====
The au pair concept was introduced in China in 2001 by the HHS Center (the first au pair agency in China), and was transcribed Hu Hui Sheng in Pinyin (互惠生). In 2007, negotiations between agencies in China and the United States were successful and the American Cultural Exchange became the first organization to bring a Chinese au pair to the United States. In March 2007, the first Chinese au pair arrived in the United States.

Chinese au pairs are desirable by American host families, attributed to the growing number of Chinese baby adoptions and the desire of parents to teach their children Mandarin, to capitalize on China's economic influence.

== Notable au pairs ==
- Alice Anderson, English assemblage artist, sculptor, and film-maker
- Aifric Campbell, Irish writer
- Anna Del Conte, Italian food writer
- Julie Ege, Norwegian actress and former Miss Norway
- Annie Ernaux, 2022 Nobel Prize winner for literature
- Angela Hartnett, English chef
- Eva Joly, Norwegian-French magistrate
- Jamaica Kincaid, Antiguan-American author and Harvard professor
- Juliana Peres Magalhães, Brazilian who pled guilty in the murders of Christine Banfield and Joseph Ryan
- Veronica Maggio, Swedish singer
- Melissa Müller, Austrian journalist and author
- Elin Nordegren, model; former wife of Tiger Woods; daughter of Barbro Holmberg and Thomas Nordegren
- Sachi Parker, American actress, daughter of Shirley MacLaine
- Anna Reid, British journalist and author
- Stella Rimington, British, former Director General of MI5 and author
- Olivia Riner, accused and acquitted in the death of Kristie Fischer
- Marion Ross, American actress
- Ségolène Royal, French politician
- Jennifer Saunders, English comedian, screenwriter, singer, and actress
- Annie M.G. Schmidt, Dutch writer
- Elke Sommer, German actress
- Yutte Stensgaard, Danish actress
- Kristin Scott Thomas, English actress
- Beate Uhse-Rotermund, German pilot and entrepreneur
- Louise Woodward, convicted of involuntary manslaughter
- Molly Martens Corbett, convicted of voluntary manslaughter of Jason Corbett

== See also ==
- Student exchange program
- Domestic helper
- European Agreement on Au Pair Placement
