= Edith D. Banfield =

American politician

Member of the New Hampshire House of Representatives from the Carroll County district
- In office 1937–1949

Personal details
- Party: Republican

Edith D. Banfield was an American state legislator in New Hampshire. She lived in Moultonborough and represented Carroll County in the New Hampshire House of Representatives from 1937 to 1949. She was a Republican.

== See also ==
- Female state legislators in the United States
