= Ann Banfield =

American academic

Ann Banfield, is a professor Emeritus of English at the University of California, Berkeley.

Banfield has taught at Berkeley since 1975 and is a specialist in linguistics, critical theory and the use of philosophy as a cornerstone of modernism. In the field of narratology, Banfield has been given lasting credit for her concepts of narratorless subjectivity and addresseelessness in narration.

== Works ==
- Banfield, Ann (1982). Unspeakable Sentences: Narration and Representation in the Language of Fiction. Boston: Routledge & Paul. ISBN 9780710009050.
- Banfield, Ann (2000). The phantom table : Woolf, Fry, Russell, and epistemology of modernism. Cambridge, U.K.: Cambridge University Press. ISBN 978-0-521-03403-6.

== Awards ==
- 1982 Guggenheim Fellowship
