= Ron Banfield =

Australian rules footballer

Personal information
- Full name: Ron Banfield
- Born: 7 April 1933 (age 93)
- Original team: Mentone
- Height: 182 cm (6 ft 0 in)
- Weight: 71 kg (157 lb)

Playing career^{1}
Years	Club	Games (Goals)
1952	St Kilda	5 (1)
- ^{1} Playing statistics correct to the end of 1952.

Ron Banfield (born 7 April 1933) is a former Australian rules footballer who played with St Kilda in the Victorian Football League (VFL).
