= Francis J. Banfield =

American soldier and law enforcement officer

- Born: December 1827; England, United Kingdom
- Died: March 4, 1883 (aged 56); New York City, United States
- Occupation: Police officer
- Employer: New York City Police Department
- Known for: NYPD police sergeant who defended the State Armory during the New York Draft Riots; founding member of the "Steamboat Squad".

Francis J. Banfield (December 1827 – March 4, 1883) was an American soldier, law enforcement officer, police sergeant and founding member of the New York City Police Department "Steamboat Squad". Born in England, he emigrated to the United States as a child. He worked as a painter in his youth and later served in the Mexican-American War. He lived in California for a time before returning the New York to join the police force in June 1857.

He was first assigned to the Eleventh Ward under Captain Peter Squires, where he was appointed a sergeant, and served as acting precinct captain before being transferred to the Eighteenth Precinct commanded by Captain John Cameron. During the New York Draft Riots in 1863, the station house was destroyed by rioters. While the precinct was being attacked, Banfield had been ordered to guard the State Armory, then considered a likely target by the rioters, and held the building until he and his 20-man police force were relieved by the Broadway Squad under Sergeant Cornelious Burdick at around 2:00 am.

Banfield was made acting precinct captain of the Twenty-Third Precinct when Captain Palmer was dismissed from the force due to cowardice. He and Sergeant William Jamieson both competed to win the position on a permanent basis, a rivalry which Jamieson eventually won, and Banfield was sent back to the Eighteenth Precinct after Captain Charles N. Brackett took command of the Twenty-First Precinct. Once again under Captain Cameron's command, Banfield remained one of his closest officers until his death in 1871.

He spent time in the First, Seventh and Thirteenth Precincts until joining the "Steamboat Squad" under Sergeant George W. Gastlin. The squad was a special unit formed by Police Commissioner Joel B. Erhardt for the purpose of combating river pirates and criminal gangs active on the New York waterfront. Banfield continued to serve with the squad until his death from consumption at his son's Java Street home on March 4, 1883.
