= Arthur Banfield =

English cricketer

Arthur Banfield (28 January 1897 – 3 January 1972) was an English cricketer who played first-class cricket for Essex in the 1921 season. He was born in Hackney and died in Raynes Park.

Banfield, a tailender, played just one first-class match, in which he scored a duck in the only innings in which he batted, and took 2–62 with the ball. Essex lost the match by an innings margin and Banfield never played first-class cricket again.
