= John Bandfield =

American politician

John Bandfield (September 29, 1826 – November 7, 1903) was an American farmer, merchant and politician from New York.

== Life ==
He was born on September 29, 1826, in Erin, then in Tioga County, now in Chemung County, New York. He attended a district school for nine months. He engaged in farming, dealt in produce, and ran a general store in the Village of Van Etten.

Bandfield entered politics as a Democrat, became a Republican in 1856, and joined the Greenback Party in 1877. He was Supervisor of the Town of Van Etten in 1862, and from 1865 to 1867. In November 1878, he was elected to the New York State Assembly, polling 3,412 votes against 3,019 for his Republican, and 2,325 for his Democratic opponent. He was a member of the 102nd New York State Legislature in 1879.

He died on November 7, 1903.

== Sources ==
New York State Assembly
| Preceded by George M. Baird | New York State Assembly; Chemung County; 1879 | Succeeded by Henry C. Hoffman |
