= Murders of Christine Banfield and Joseph Ryan =

2023 murders in Virginia

- Location: Herndon, Fairfax County, Virginia, U.S.
- Date: February 24, 2023; 3 years ago
- Attack type: Double homicide, domestic violence
- Victims: Christine Banfield, aged 37; Joseph Ryan, aged 39
- Perpetrators: Brendan Banfield; Juliana Peres Magalhães
- Motive: plan to end marriage by luring a stranger over the internet and staging the crime as home invasion
- Inquiry: Fairfax County Police Department investigation
- Verdict: Guilty on all counts (aggravated murder, firearm charges, child endangerment)
- Convictions: Aggravated murder (Banfield, 2 counts); Child endangerment (Banfield); Firearm offense (Banfield); Manslaughter (Magalhães plea)
- Convicted: Brendan Banfield; Juliana Peres Magalhães (au pair; pleaded guilty to involuntary manslaughter)

The murders of Christine Banfield and Joseph Ryan, dubbed the au pair affair and the au pair murders in the media, occurred on February 24, 2023, in Herndon, Fairfax County, Virginia. In 2026, a Fairfax County jury convicted Banfield's husband, former Internal Revenue Service agent Brendan Banfield, of the aggravated murder of his wife and Ryan, a stranger to the family, in what prosecutors described as a premeditated plot in which Brendan and his lover, the family's Brazilian au pair, Juliana Peres Magalhães, lured Ryan to the family's house so that they could commit the murders and stage the crime scene as a home invasion gone wrong. Peres Magalhães had previously pleaded guilty to involuntary manslaughter in Ryan's death and testified as the key witness for the prosecution at Banfield's trial, and was herself sentenced to ten years in prison.

The case gained extensive media attention because of the reported extramarital affair between Brendan Banfield and Juliana Peres Magalhães, the alleged use of fetish website FetLife to lure Ryan to the home under the pretense of a BDSM encounter, and the prosecution's case that after the murders, the guilty parties had deliberately arranged the scene to appear as a violent break-in by a stranger that was thwarted by the defendants.

== Background ==
Christine Banfield was a pediatric intensive care nurse living in Herndon, Virginia, with her husband, Brendan Banfield, and their young daughter. Joseph Ryan, from Washington, D.C., had no known connection to the Banfields prior to the incident.

After Peres Magalhães was employed by the Banfields as an au pair, Brendan Banfield and Peres Magalhães began an extramarital affair in 2022, including a trip to New York City together. During the course of the relationship, Brendan Banfield expressed a desire to end his marriage without financial repercussions or a custody dispute.

Brendan Banfield created a fake FetLife account under Christine Banfield's name to lure Ryan to the Banfields' home under the false pretense that Christine wanted to participate in BDSM roleplay.

== The murder ==
On the morning of February 24, 2023, police responded to 911 calls from the Banfield residence. Officers found Christine Banfield suffering from multiple stab wounds and Joseph Ryan dead from gunshot wounds inside an upstairs bedroom. There were no signs of forced entry, and the Banfields' child was found unharmed in the basement.

Brendan Banfield and Peres Magalhães initially told police that Ryan had entered the house, attacked Christine with a knife, and was then shot by both Brendan Banfield and Peres Magalhães in self-defense. Investigators concluded that this account was contradicted by physical and digital evidence.

== Investigation and arrests ==
Peres Magalhães was arrested in October 2023, and charged with second-degree murder and firearm offenses. In September 2024, Brendan Banfield was indicted on multiple counts arising from the murders, and was taken into custody and denied bond as a flight risk and a danger to his young daughter. Peres Magalhães pled guilty to involuntary manslaughter in Ryan's killing in October 2024, agreeing to testify against Brendan Banfield for the prosecution.

Brendan Banfield was convicted of aggravated murder on February 2, 2026. The following week, Peres Magalhães was sentenced to ten years in prison, with the judge disregarding the recommendation of "time served" made by the prosecution pursuant to the plea deal made in exchange for her testimony in the case. In June 2026, Banfield was sentenced to consecutive life sentences in prison without the possibility of parole.
