= Benfield =

Benfield is an English toponymic surname from one or more of the numerous places in England called Benfield or Binfield. Notable people with this name include:

- Andrea Benfield (born 1978), English journalist
- Christopher Benfield Carter (1844–1906), Canadian politician
- Derek Benfield (1926–2009), British playwright and actor
- Fred Benfield (1937–2007), Australian rower who competed in the 1956 Summer Olympics
- John Benfield (1951–2020), British actor, who has appeared in 75 TV episodes or films starting in 1981
- Robert Benfield (died 1649), seventeenth-century actor, longtime member of the King's Men
- Tommy Benfield (1889–1918), English footballer
- Warren Benfield (1913–2001), classical double bass player

== See also ==
- Benfield Group, reinsurance and risk intermediary
- Benfield School, 11–18 state comprehensive school in Walkergate, Newcastle upon Tyne, England
- Newcastle Benfield F.C., football club based in Newcastle upon Tyne, England

== See also ==
- Benefield, a spelling variation
