= Edward Banfield (railroad engineer) =

Argentine businessman

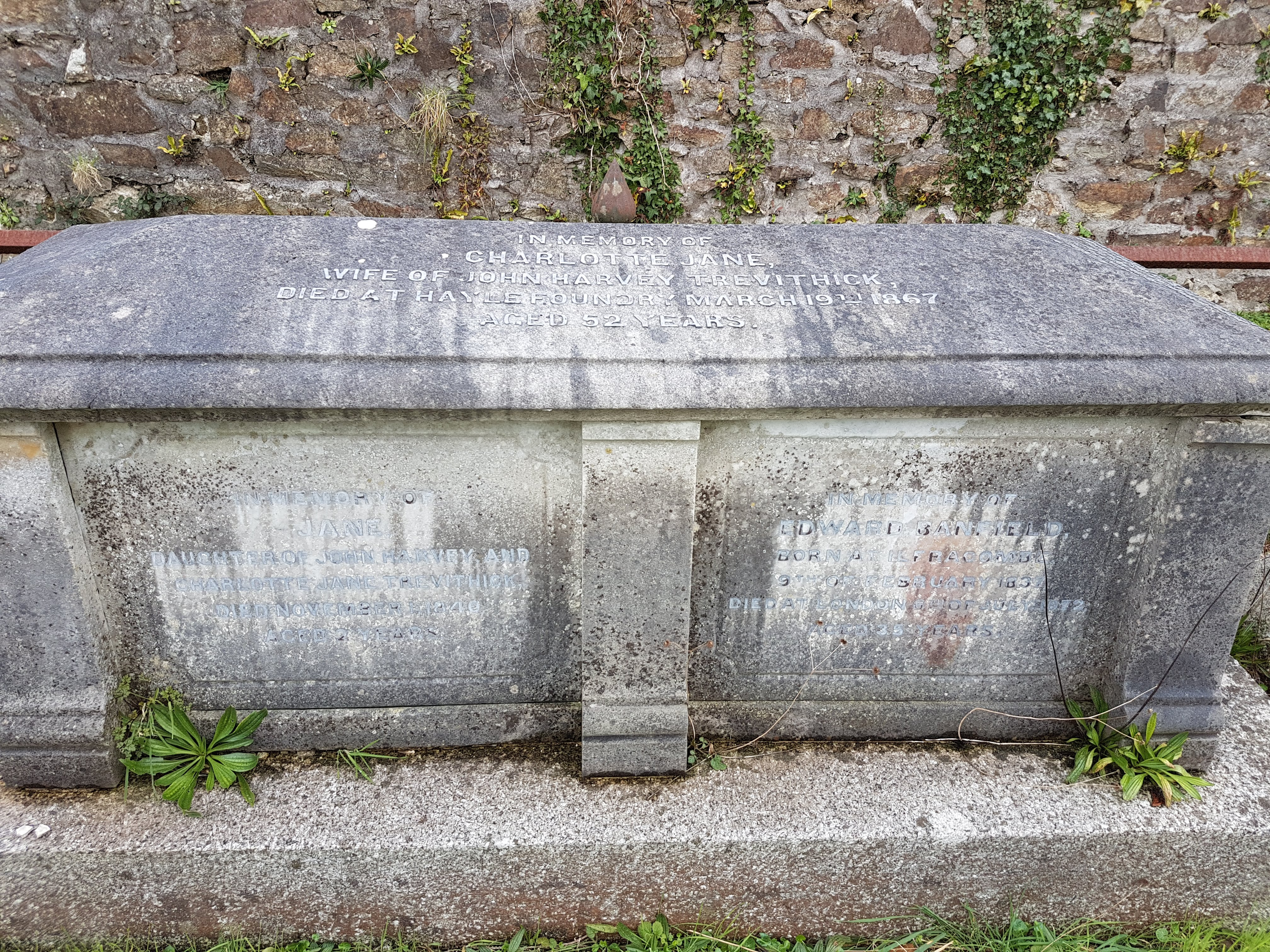
Family Chest Tomb which includes IN MEMORY OF EDWARD BANFIELD, BORN AT ILFRACOMBE, 9TH OF FEBRUARY 1837, DIED AT LONDON ON 6TH OF JULY 1872, AGED 35 YEARS.

Edward Banfield

Edward Banfield (Ilfracombe, North Devon, 9 February 1837 – London, 6 July 1872) was an English railroad engineer who drove the first locomotive (La Porteña) through Buenos Aires, Argentina, in 1857 as part of the Buenos Aires Western Railway. He was the first General Manager of the British-owned Buenos Aires Great Southern Railway between 1865 and 1872, founded in Argentina by Edward Lund in 1862. Banfield died in 1872, and the Southern Railway named the actual train station in his honour in 1873. The town of Banfield in Buenos Aires Province, which grew into a city, inherited that name. The professional Argentine football club Club Atlético Banfield with headquarters there, also carries his name.

In 1872, he felt ill, and ended as General Manager, returning to London with his wife Jane, and their daughter, Elizabeth, born in 1871 in Argentina. He died in London that same year and his daughter on 5 February 1874, aged 2. They are buried, along with his wife, in Cornwall, in a churchyard by St. Erth church in a family chest tomb.

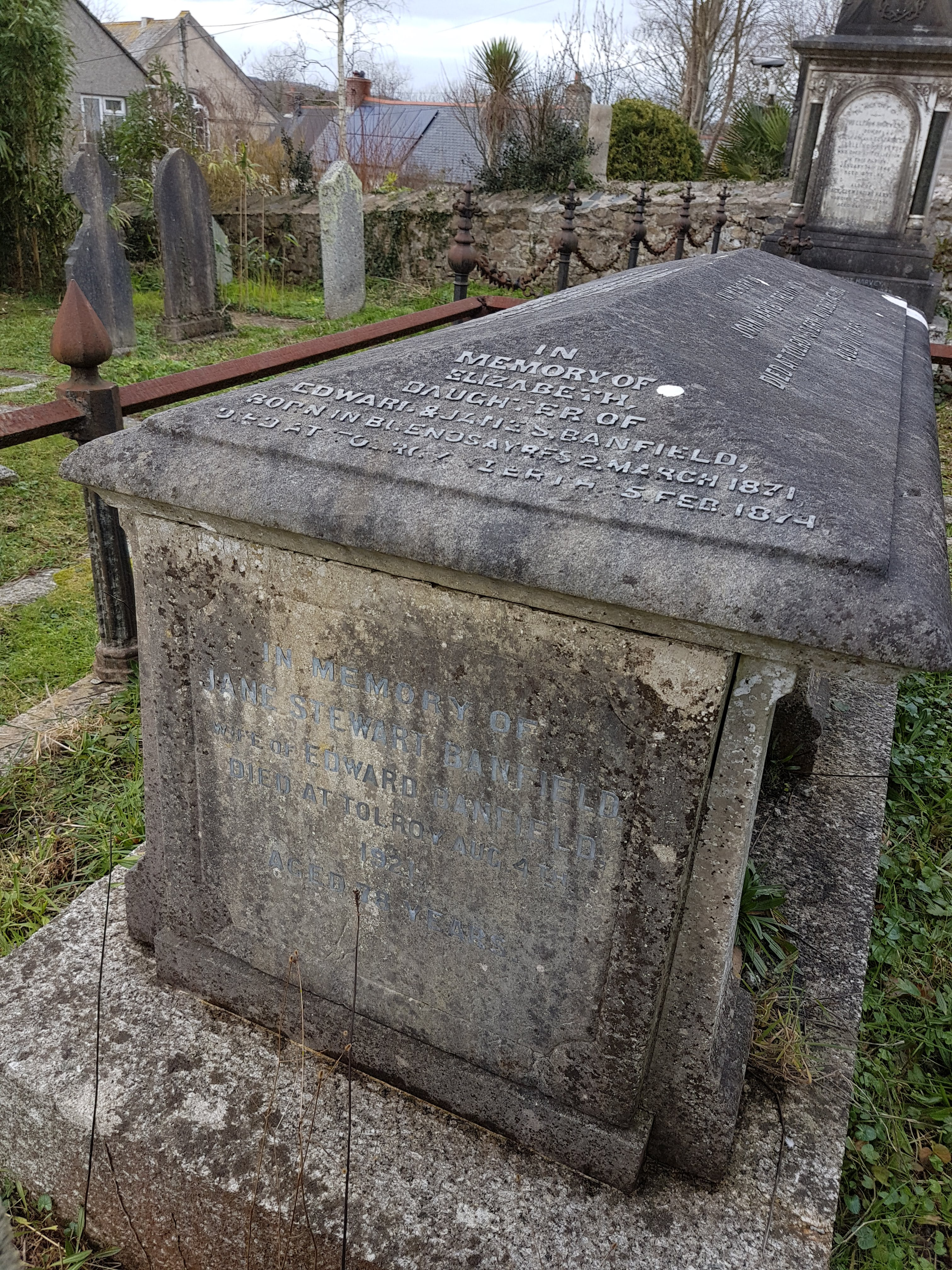
IN MEMORY OF ELIZABETH, DAUGHTER OF EDWARD & JANE S. BANFIELD, BORN IN BUENOS AYRES 2.MARCH 1871, DIED AT TOLROY, ST. ERTH, 5.FEB, 1874. IN MEMORY OF JANE STEWART BANFIELD, WIFE OF EDWARD BANFIELD, DIED AT TOLROY AUG.4TH, 1921. AGED 78 YEARS.

== See also ==
- Rail transport in Argentina
