= Banfield, Argentina =

City in Buenos Aires Province, Argentina

Banfield
- City
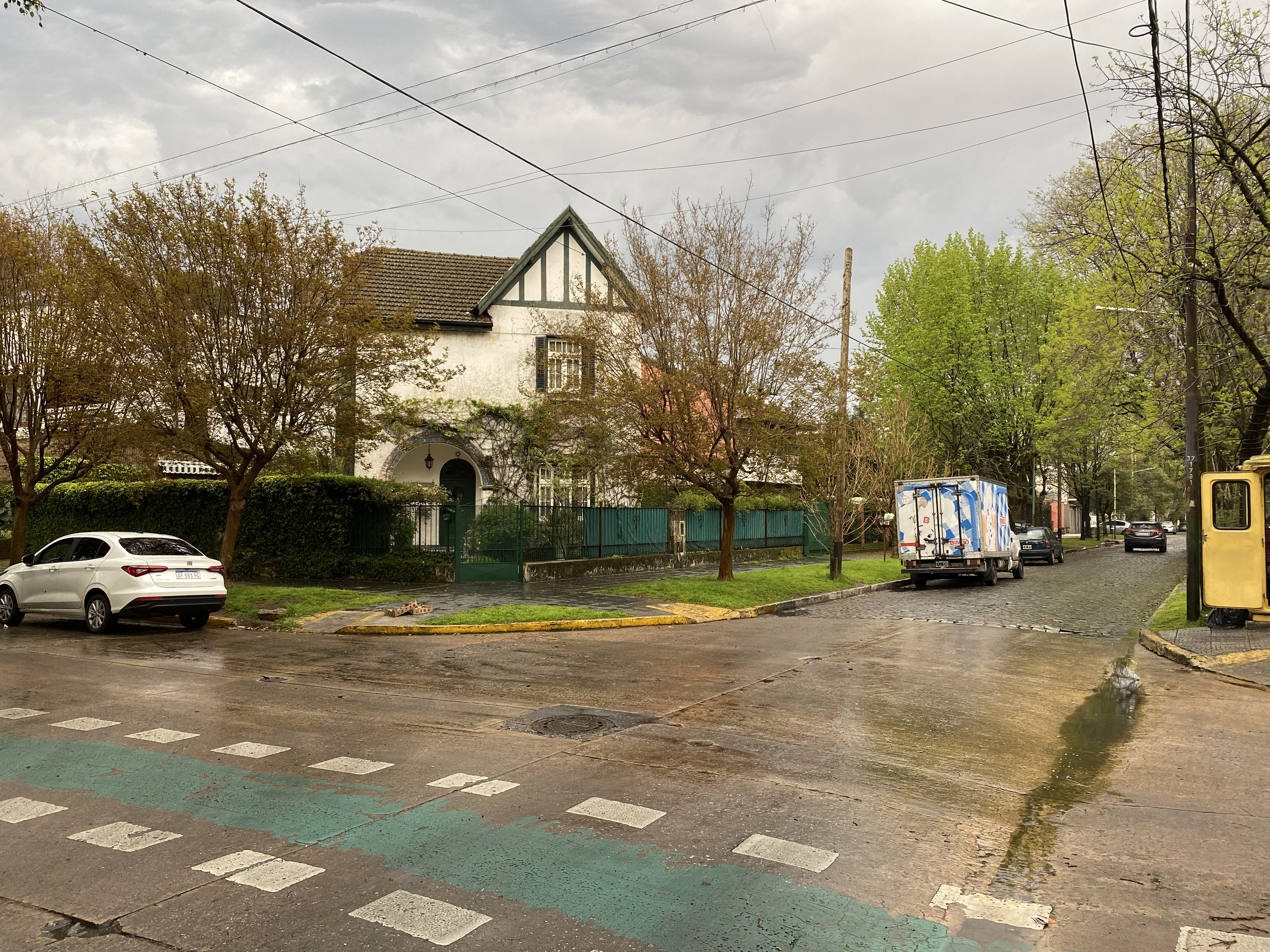
- Azara Street in Banfield.

- Location in Greater Buenos Aires
- Coordinates: 34°45′0″S 58°23′0″W
- Country: Argentina
- Province: Buenos Aires
- Partido: Lomas de Zamora

Government
  - Intendant: Federico Otermín

Area
  - Total: 8.12 km^{2} (3.14 sq mi)
- Elevation: 12 m (39 ft)

Population (2022 census)
  - Total: 61,072
  - Density: 7,520/km^{2} (19,500/sq mi)
  - Demonym: banfileño/a
- Time zone: UTC−3 (ART)
- Postal code: B 1828
- Phone code: +54 11

Banfield is a city in the district of Lomas de Zamora in Buenos Aires Province, Argentina, 14 km (9 mi) south of the city center of Buenos Aires. It forms part of the Greater Buenos Aires metro area. It is named after the English railroad engineer Edward Banfield.

== History ==
The area where the city is currently located originated from the laying of the railroad tracks. In principle, this allowed communication between Chascomús and the city of Buenos Aires, which at that time was the provincial capital. The yellow fever epidemic that occurred in 1871 diversified the location of the population, mainly in the suburbs, as well as in the sectors near the capital, until then little chosen.

Juan de Zamora sold his property to the Colegio de Nuestra Señora de Belén in 1765, but in 1767 the Jesuit order of Río de la Plata was expelled and dissolved. The property received the name Del Rey, as well as the stream. After 1810, La Estancia del Rey changed its name to Estancia del Estado, which was sold in 1814 to Anacleto Cajigas. In 1815 that property was transferred to Ignacio Correas, who settled in the place later known as Monte Correas. In 1833 he annexed a property whose fate would later be the site of the subdivision that occurred in 1873: Calle Real (current Alsina Avenue), Chacabuco, Rincón and Arenales. Notary of Laureano Silva. Ignacio Correa bequeathed the property to his daughter Magdalena Correa who in turn sold it in 1854 to Gregorio Larios, who in turn sold it to José Plá in 1872.

The birth of the town can be placed with the creation of the railway station in 1871.

On August 15, 1873, in the newspaper La Prensa, the notice of the firm Adolfo Bulrich was published, which read:

"HALF IN CASH AND HALF IN 6 MONTHS - Unrivaled land For liquidation - Free train - Beer, etc. In Banfield Vaulted streets and groves of paradise 417 Soaring lots, adjoining the great buildings of the Ferrocarril del Sud, under construction SUPERIOR TITLES - FREE SCRIPTURES Sunday 17th of the current at 12 o'clock ". The first deed on the plan of the auction of A. Bullrich is dated August 19, 1873. (The lottery was carried out on Sunday the 17th at noon), in the name of Alejandro Tabaco, and the second, dated August 20, in the name by Diego Stevens.

At the beginning of the 20th century, Banfield station was located from west to east between what is currently Hipólito Yrigoyen Avenue and Leandro N. Alem Street; and from north to south between Alberto Larroque street and Pedro Uriarte avenue. The large buildings referred to in the notice are the workshops near the Remedios de Escalada Station. The buildings where the railway warehouses and workshops operated today are occupied by the National University of Lanús, the Argentine Ferroclub, headquarters of Remedios de Escalada, and the Locomotive and Wagon Repair Workshop.

In 1871 there was an outbreak of yellow fever, at the same time several families of an incipient middle class emigrated from Buenos Aires to Banfield.

The city began with a modest wooden box located in what is now the Banfield Station, from where Maipú (to the east) and French (to the west) streets emerge. The main shopping center is located on the first; a small number of businesses are located on the second to the west. Originally the railway station grew to the west and the vegetable farms and some dairy farms were located to the east. This can be seen if attention is paid to the station fronts at Banfield, Lomas de Zamora and Temperley. All of them have the station manager's office on the western end platform. When these cities expanded by subdividing small farms and farms, the new part of the city generated a main street to the east where businesses were located.

Provincial Law No. 6,331, sanctioned on October 28, 1960, promulgated on November 11, and published in the Official Gazette on November 17, declared Banfield a City.

During the last military dictatorship in the country, self-styled National Reorganization Process, a clandestine detention center known as Pozo de Banfield operated at the intersection of Vernet and Siciliano streets; today it is a museum of memory.

== Demographics ==
With 223,898 inhabitants (Indec, 2001), the city of Banfield is the most populous city in the partido, since it amounts to almost double that of Lomas de Zamora and Temperley, almost 38% of the total population of the partido.

== Sports ==
The city is home to Club Atlético Banfield football club founded in 1896, and to the Lomas Athletic Club.

== Culture ==
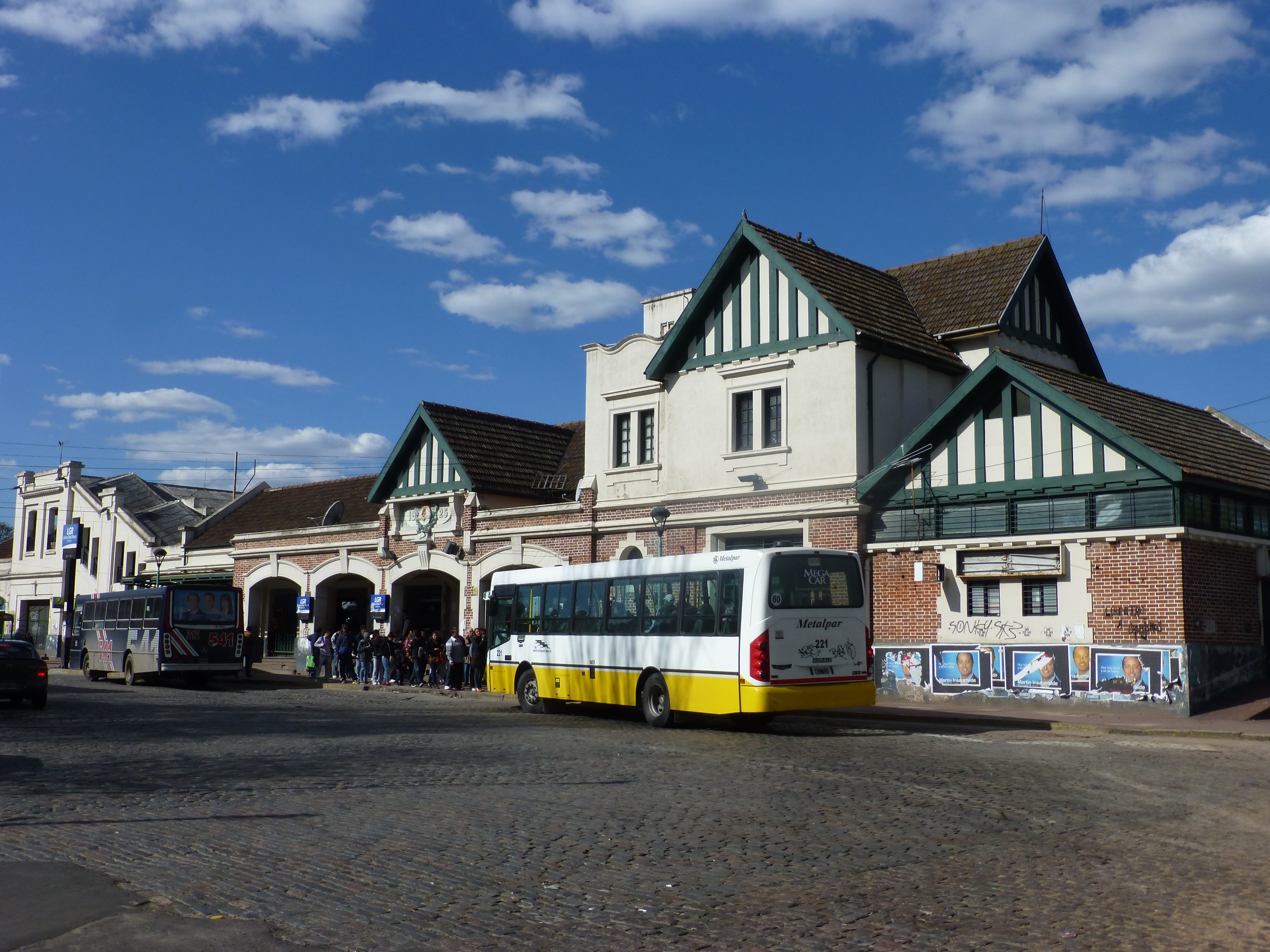
Banfield railway station

It is the base of the Julián Aguirre Conservatory of Music, founded by classical composer and conductor Alberto Ginastera in 1951.

The writer Julio Cortázar, though born in Belgium, spent much of his childhood in Banfield. Banfield was also home of the renowned tango composer Alfredo De Angelis and the popular singer Sandro.

Home of the Pio Collivadino Museum, Medrano 165, Lomas de Zamora: Collivadino, one of Argentina's most famous artists, was the Director of the Academy of Fine Arts in Buenos Aires and an organizer of the Prilidiano Pueyrreddon School of Fine Arts until he was forced to retire by the military dictator, General Pedro Pablo Ramirez, in 1944. Collivadino died in Buenos Aires in 1945 at the age of 76.

== Gallery ==
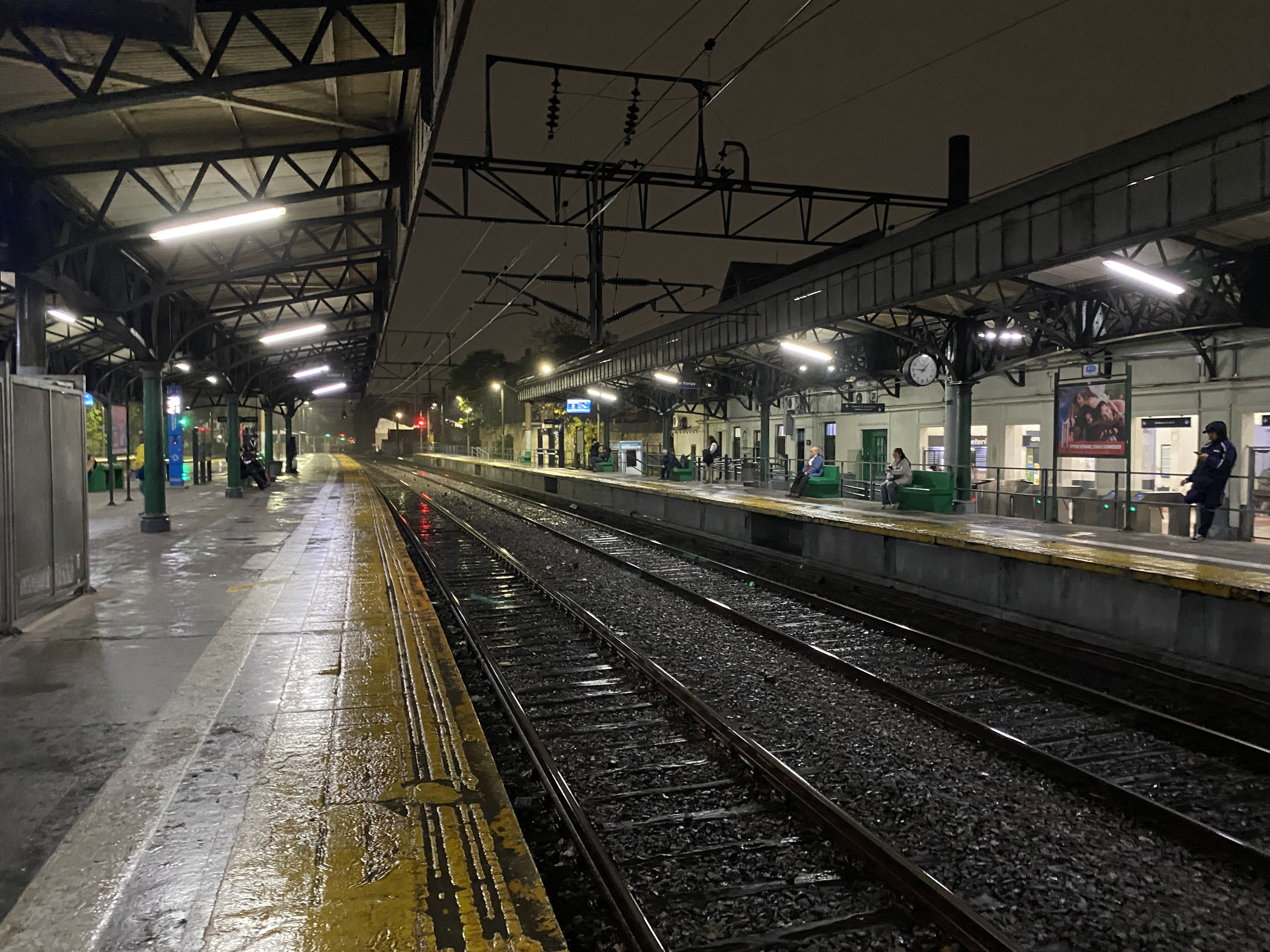
Banfield train station.

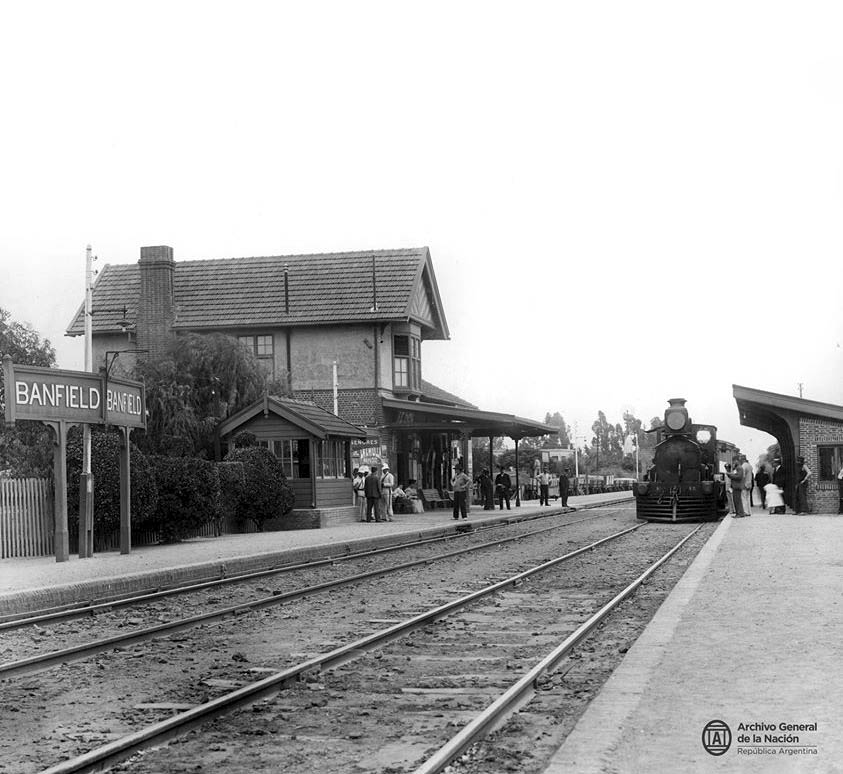
Banfield train station c.1900.

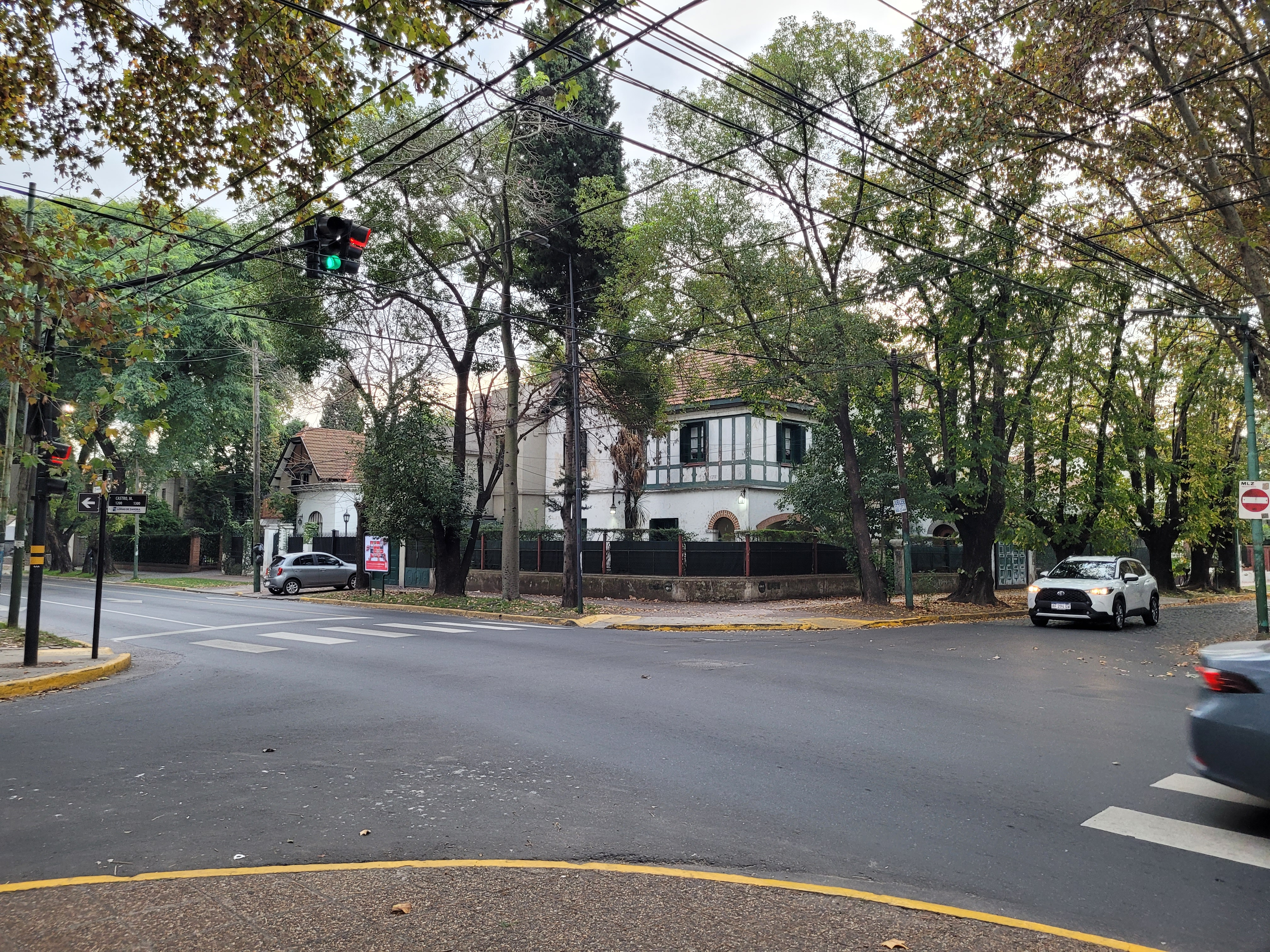
Larroque avenue.

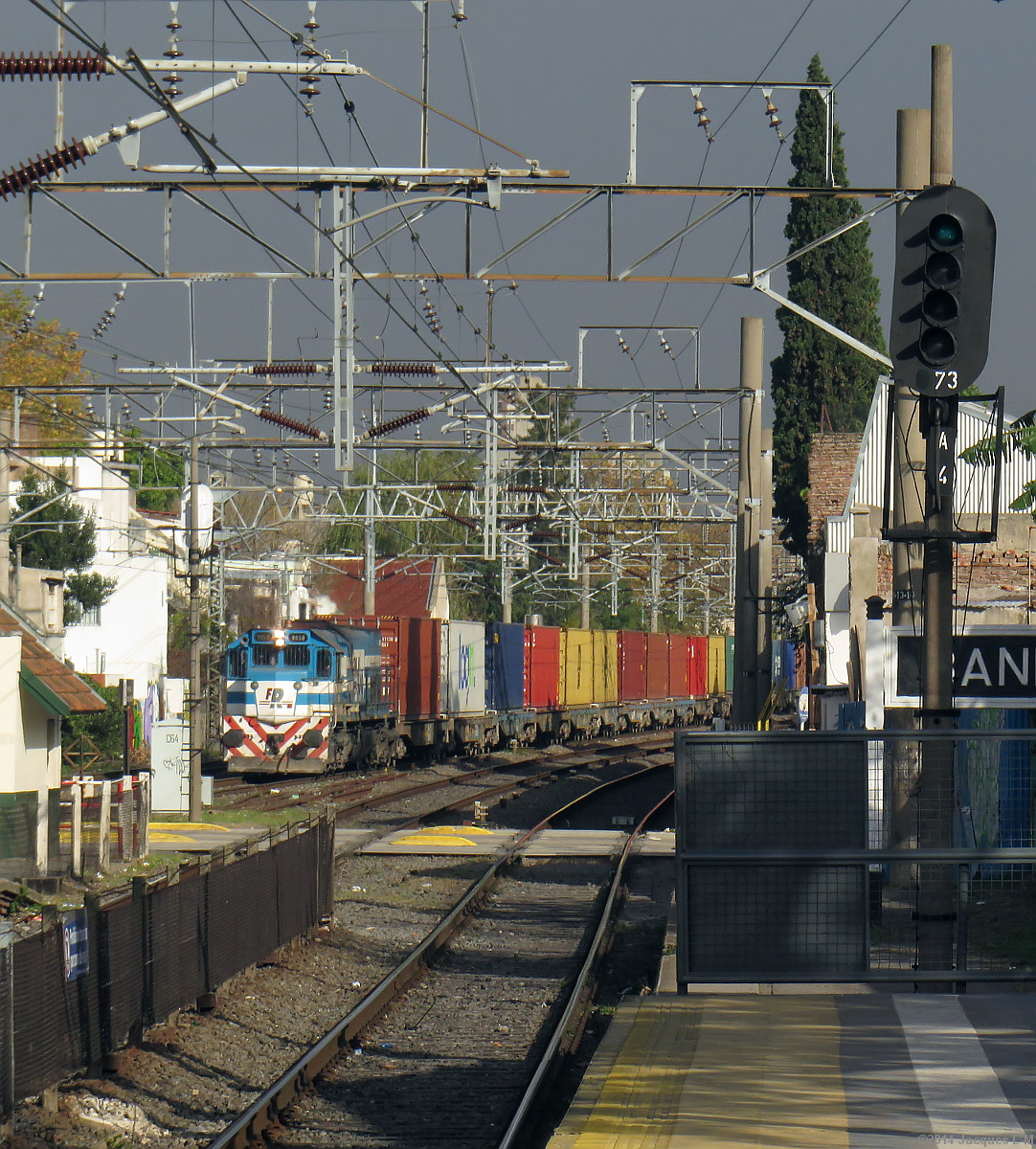
A Ferrosur Roca freight train at Banfield train station.

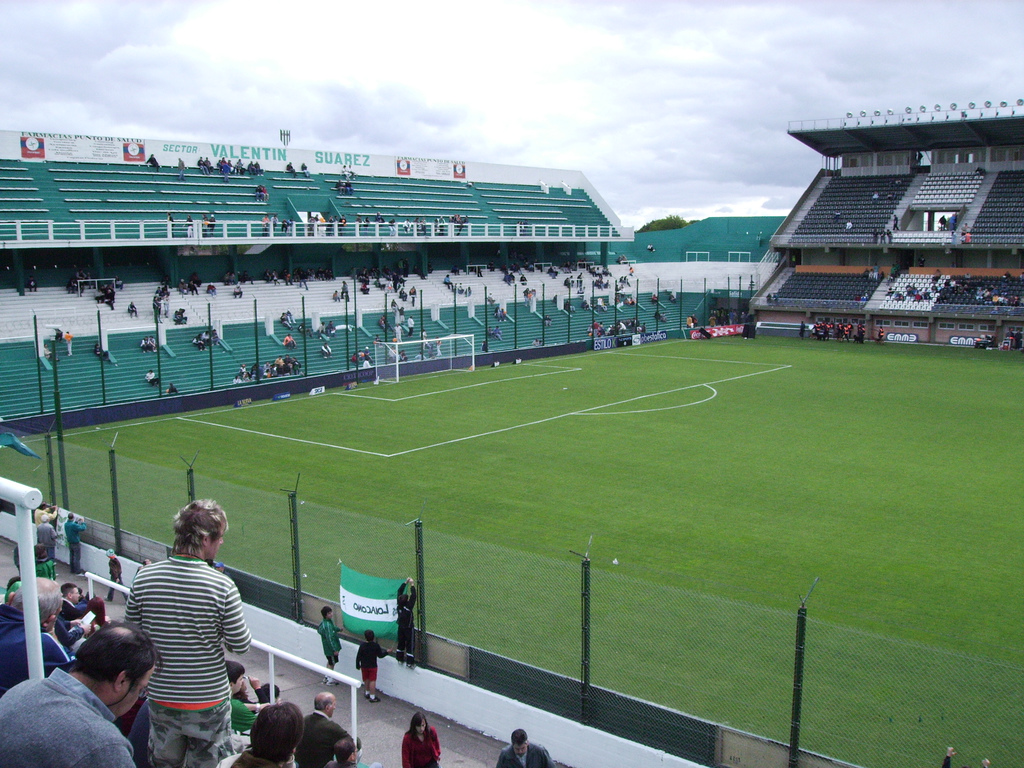
View of Florencio Sola Stadium.
