= Binfield (disambiguation) =

Binfield is a village and civil parish in Berkshire, England.

Binfield may also refer to:

- Binfield F.C., an English football club
- Binfield, Isle of Wight, a hamlet on the Isle of Wight

== People with the surname ==
- Gary Binfield (1966–2008), British swimmer
- Ernest Binfield Havell, English arts administrator

== See also ==
- Binfield Heath, a village and civil parish in Oxfordshire, England
