= 2000–01 Rochdale A.F.C. season =

English football club season

Rochdale
2000–01 season
- Chairman: David Kilpatrick
- Manager: Steve Parkin
- Third Division: 8th
- FA Cup: First round
- League Cup: First round
- Top goalscorer: League: Paul Connor (10 goals); All: Paul Connor; Clive Platt (10 each)

The 2000–01 season was Rochdale A.F.C.'s 94th in existence and their 27th consecutive in the fourth tier of the English football league, named at the time as the Football League Third Division.

== Statistics ==
| No. | Pos | Nat | Player | Total | | League Division 3 | | FA Cup | | League Cup | | League Trophy | |
| No. | Pos | Nat | Player | Apps | Goals | Apps | Goals | Apps | Goals | Apps | Goals | Apps | Goals |
|---|---|---|---|---|---|---|---|---|---|---|---|---|---|
| 23 | FW | (England) ENG | Lee Buggie | 2 | 0 | 0 + 2 | 0 | 0 + 0 | 0 | 0 + 0 | 0 | 0 + 0 | 0 |
| 27 | FW | (England) ENG | Paul Connor | 14 | 10 | 14 + 0 | 10 | 0 + 0 | 0 | 0 + 0 | 0 | 0 + 0 | 0 |
| 30 | GK | (Scotland) SCO | Matt Gilks | 3 | 0 | 2 + 1 | 0 | 0 + 0 | 0 | 0 + 0 | 0 | 0 + 0 | 0 |
| 20 | FW | (England) ENG | Phil Hadland | 35 | 2 | 12 + 20 | 2 | 1 + 0 | 0 | 0 + 1 | 0 | 1 + 0 | 0 |
| 26 | DF | (England) ENG | Dean Howell | 3 | 0 | 2 + 1 | 0 | 0 + 0 | 0 | 0 + 0 | 0 | 0 + 0 | 0 |
| 25 | FW | (Scotland) SCO | Kevin Kyle | 6 | 0 | 3 + 3 | 0 | 0 + 0 | 0 | 0 + 0 | 0 | 0 + 0 | 0 |
| 25 | FW | (England) ENG | Christian Lee | 5 | 1 | 2 + 3 | 1 | 0 + 0 | 0 | 0 + 0 | 0 | 0 + 0 | 0 |
| 9 | DF | (England) ENG | Michael Oliver | 42 | 0 | 25 + 13 | 0 | 1 + 0 | 0 | 2 + 0 | 0 | 1 + 0 | 0 |
| 12 | DF | (England) ENG | Lee Todd | 43 | 3 | 40 + 0 | 3 | 1 + 0 | 0 | 2 + 0 | 0 | 0 + 0 | 0 |
| 28 | FW | (Republic of Ireland) IRL | Andy Turner | 4 | 0 | 2 + 2 | 0 | 0 + 0 | 0 | 0 + 0 | 0 | 0 + 0 | 0 |
| 99 | FW | (England) ENG | David Walsh | 1 | 0 | 0 + 0 | 0 | 0 + 0 | 0 | 0 + 1 | 0 | 0 + 0 | 0 |
| 1 | GK | (Wales) WAL | Neil Edwards | 48 | 0 | 44 + 0 | 0 | 1 + 0 | 0 | 2 + 0 | 0 | 1 + 0 | 0 |
| 2 | DF | (Wales) WAL | Wayne Evans | 49 | 2 | 45 + 0 | 2 | 1 + 0 | 0 | 2 + 0 | 0 | 1 + 0 | 0 |
| 3 | DF | (England) ENG | Sean McAuley | 2 | 0 | 1 + 0 | 0 | 0 + 0 | 0 | 0 + 0 | 0 | 1 + 0 | 0 |
| 4 | DF | (England) ENG | Simon Coleman | 5 | 0 | 5 + 0 | 0 | 0 + 0 | 0 | 0 + 0 | 0 | 0 + 0 | 0 |
| 5 | DF | (England) ENG | Mark Monington | 36 | 7 | 31 + 3 | 7 | 1 + 0 | 0 | 0 + 0 | 0 | 1 + 0 | 0 |
| 6 | DF | (England) ENG | Keith Hill | 28 | 0 | 22 + 3 | 0 | 1 + 0 | 0 | 2 + 0 | 0 | 0 + 0 | 0 |
| 7 | MF | (England) ENG | David Flitcroft | 44 | 0 | 40 + 1 | 0 | 0 + 0 | 0 | 1 + 1 | 0 | 0 + 1 | 0 |
| 8 | DF | (England) ENG | Paul Ware | 34 | 2 | 17 + 13 | 2 | 1 + 0 | 0 | 2 + 0 | 0 | 1 + 0 | 0 |
| 10 | FW | (England) ENG | Graham Lancashire | 18 | 3 | 6 + 10 | 3 | 0 + 1 | 0 | 0 + 0 | 0 | 0 + 1 | 0 |
| 14 | DF | (England) ENG | Tony Ford | 41 | 2 | 36 + 2 | 2 | 1 + 0 | 0 | 2 + 0 | 0 | 0 + 0 | 0 |
| 16 | DF | (England) ENG | Dave Bayliss | 44 | 3 | 41 + 0 | 3 | 0 + 0 | 0 | 2 + 0 | 0 | 1 + 0 | 0 |
| 18 | MF | (England) ENG | Gary Jones | 48 | 9 | 44 + 0 | 8 | 1 + 0 | 0 | 1 + 1 | 0 | 1 + 0 | 1 |
| 19 | FW | (England) ENG | Kevin Townson | 3 | 0 | 1 + 2 | 0 | 0 + 0 | 0 | 0 + 0 | 0 | 0 + 0 | 0 |
| 21 | FW | (England) ENG | Clive Platt | 47 | 10 | 39 + 4 | 8 | 1 + 0 | 1 | 2 + 0 | 1 | 1 + 0 | 0 |
| 23 | FW | (Northern Ireland) NIR | Gary Hamilton | 3 | 0 | 0 + 3 | 0 | 0 + 0 | 0 | 0 + 0 | 0 | 0 + 0 | 0 |
| 24 | FW | (England) ENG | Tony Ellis | 31 | 7 | 25 + 3 | 6 | 0 + 1 | 0 | 1 + 0 | 1 | 1 + 0 | 0 |
| 15 | MF | (Wales) WAL | Simon Davies | 16 | 1 | 7 + 5 | 1 | 0 + 1 | 0 | 1 + 1 | 0 | 0 + 1 | 0 |

== Competitions ==
=== Football League Third Division ===
| 12 August 2000 1 | Rochdale | 1 – 1 | Darlington | Rochdale |
| | Davies 53' (pen.) (yellow card) 66'; Flitcroft (yellow card) 84' | Report | Nogan 9'; Reed (yellow card) 36'; Kaak (yellow card) 42'; Himsworth (yellow card) 47'; Heckingbottom (yellow card) 51'; Elliott (yellow card) 75' | Stadium: Spotland Stadium; Attendance: 3255; Referee: M. Cooper |

| 19 August 2000 2 | Brighton & Hove Albion | 2 – 1 | Rochdale | Brighton |
| | Zamora 17', 45'; Crosby (red card) 19'; Hart (yellow card) 26'; Oatway (yellow card) 61' | Report | Ford 14'; Ellis (red card) 19'; Hill (yellow card) 37'; Ware (yellow card) 59'; Todd (yellow card) 61'; Lancashire (yellow card) 85' | Stadium: Withdean Stadium; Attendance: 6076; Referee: P. Prosser |

| 26 August 2000 3 | Rochdale | 3 – 2 | Scunthorpe United | Rochdale |
| | Bayliss (yellow card) 6'; Ellis 35'; Platt 54'; Ware 63' (yellow card) 85' | Report | Sheldon 43'; Hodges 47' (pen.) (yellow card) 60' | Stadium: Spotland Stadium; Attendance: 2561; Referee: M. Warren |

| 28 August 2000 4 | Halifax Town | 1 – 2 | Rochdale | Halifax |
| | Bradshaw 18' | Report | Platt 4'; Jones 61' | Stadium: The Shay; Attendance: 2783; Referee: C. Webster |

| 2 September 2000 5 | Rochdale | 1 – 1 | Cardiff City | Rochdale |
| | Hadland 81' | Report | Brayson 10' | Stadium: Spotland Stadium; Attendance: 2844; Referee: Mike Dean |

| 9 September 2000 6 | Carlisle United | 1 – 2 | Rochdale | Carlisle |
| | Stevens 37' | Report | Platt 16' (yellow card) 71'; Todd 90' | Stadium: Brunton Park; Attendance: 3906; Referee: Mark Clattenburg |

| 12 September 2000 7 | York City | 0 – 2 | Rochdale | York |
| | Sertori (yellow card) 75' | Report | Platt 8'; Monington 41' | Stadium: Bootham Crescent; Attendance: 2215; Referee: Roy Pearson |

| 16 September 2000 8 | Rochdale | 2 – 1 | Torquay United | Rochdale |
| | Monington 3' (yellow card); Ellis 24' | Report | Russell (yellow card) 44'; Herrera 53'; Bedeau (yellow card) 72' | Stadium: Spotland Stadium; Attendance: 2871; Referee: Anthony Bates |

| 23 September 2000 9 | Shrewsbury Town | 0 – 4 | Rochdale | Shrewsbury |
| | Peer (yellow card) 23' | Report | Ellis 18'; Platt 55'; Monington 63'; Bayliss 69' | Stadium: Gay Meadow; Attendance: 3427; Referee: Trevor Parkes |

| 30 September 2000 10 | Rochdale | 0 – 1 | Southend United | Rochdale |
| | Ellis (yellow card) 20'; Flitcroft (yellow card) 44'; Davies (yellow card) 86' | Report | Carruthers 31'; Booty (yellow card) 42'; Roget (yellow card) 44'; Houghton (yellow card) 54' | Stadium: Spotland Stadium; Attendance: 3264; Referee: Phil Dowd |

| 6 October 2000 11 | Kidderminster Harriers | 0 – 0 | Rochdale | Kidderminster |
| | | Report | Platt (yellow card) 58'; Bayliss (yellow card) 77' | Stadium: Aggborough Stadium; Attendance: 3904; Referee: M. North |

| 14 October 2000 12 | Rochdale | 2 – 1 | Hartlepool United | Rochdale |
| | Ford 17'; Jones 79' (pen.) | Report | Lormor (yellow card) 44' (goal) 59' | Stadium: Spotland Stadium; Attendance: 2813; Referee: G. Stretton |

| 17 October 2000 13 | Rochdale | 2 – 2 | Chesterfield | Rochdale |
| | Jones 20' (pen.); Ellis (yellow card) 50'; Bayliss (yellow card) 67'; Monington 70'; Flitcroft (yellow card) 79' | Report | Tutill (yellow card) 10'; Monington 36' (o.g.); Reeves 40'; Blatherwick (yellow card) 50' | Stadium: Spotland Stadium; Attendance: 5008; Referee: G. B. Frankland |

| 21 October 2000 14 | Cheltenham Town | 0 – 2 | Rochdale | Cheltenham |
| | Freeman (yellow card) 35' | Report | Monington 34'; Jones (yellow card) 50'; Flitcroft (yellow card) 57'; Monington 63' (yellow card) 78'; Platt (yellow card) 81' | Stadium: Whaddon Road; Attendance: 4033; Referee: P. Rejer |

| 24 October 2000 15 | Rochdale | 2 – 2 | Macclesfield Town | Rochdale |
| | Lee 76' (yellow card) 85'; Ware 83' | Report | Sedgemore (yellow card) 4'; Glover 6'; Barker 33'; Askey (yellow card) 89' | Stadium: Spotland Stadium; Attendance: 3608; Referee: Mark Cowburn |

| 28 October 2000 16 | Exeter City | 0 – 1 | Rochdale | Exeter |
| | Curran (yellow card) 17'; Campbell (yellow card) 36' (yellow-red card) 89' | Report | Evans (yellow card) 50'; Platt 89' | Stadium: St James Park; Attendance: 2606; Referee: Paul Alcock |

| 4 November 2000 17 | Rochdale | 0 – 0 | Barnet | Rochdale |
| | | Report | | Stadium: Spotland Stadium; Attendance: 3657; Referee: David Laws |

| 11 November 2000 18 | Mansfield Town | 1 – 0 | Rochdale | Mansfield |
| | Hassell (yellow card) 35'; Greenacre 86' | Report | Monington (yellow card) 29' | Stadium: Field Mill; Attendance: 2453; Referee: Lee Cable |

| 2 December 2000 19 | Rochdale | 1 – 0 | Blackpool | Rochdale |
| | Oliver (yellow card) 39'; Evans (yellow card) 75'; Jones 79' (yellow card) 79' | Report | Collins (yellow card) 69'; Reid (yellow card) 85' | Stadium: Spotland Stadium; Attendance: 4186; Referee: Phil Prosser |

| 16 December 2000 20 | Lincoln City | 1 – 1 | Rochdale | Lincoln |
| | Dudgeon 17'; Walker (yellow card) 73' | Report | Oliver (yellow card) 50'; Ellis 56' | Stadium: Sincil Bank; Attendance: 2320; Referee: Bill Burns |

| 23 December 2000 21 | Leyton Orient | 1 – 1 | Rochdale | London |
| | Walschaerts 76' | Report | Jones 21' (pen.) | Stadium: Brisbane Road; Attendance: 4398; Referee: Dermot Gallagher |

| 26 December 2000 22 | Rochdale | 1 – 0 | Hull City | Rochdale |
| | Jones 19' | Report | | Stadium: Spotland Stadium; Attendance: 4327; Referee: Howard Webb |

| 6 January 2001 23 | Darlington | 1 – 2 | Rochdale | Darlington |
| | Hodgson 55' | Report | Ellis 21'; Platt (yellow card) 54'; Evans 76' | Stadium: Feethams; Attendance: 3481; Referee: Brian Curson |

| 13 January 2001 24 | Rochdale | 0 – 1 | Halifax Town | Rochdale |
| | Flitcroft (yellow card) 26'; Bayliss (yellow card) 68' | Report | Kerrigan 31' | Stadium: Spotland Stadium; Attendance: 4123; Referee: Graham Laws |

| 28 January 2001 25 | Rochdale | 3 – 1 | Leyton Orient | Rochdale |
| | Ellis 17'; Todd (yellow card) 38'; Jones 41'; Hadland 48' | Report | Smith 90' | Stadium: Spotland Stadium; Attendance: 3676; Referee: Graham Frankland |

| 2 February 2001 26 | Cardiff City | 0 – 0 | Rochdale | Cardiff |
| | Fortune-West (yellow card) 68' | Report | | Stadium: Ninian Park; Attendance: 11912; Referee: Bill Jordan |

| 13 February 2001 27 | Scunthorpe United | 0 – 0 | Rochdale | Scunthorpe |
| | Thom (yellow card) 3'; Dawson (yellow card) 35' | Report | Evans (yellow card) 22'; Flitcroft (yellow card) 32'; Todd (yellow card) 73' | Stadium: Glanford Park; Attendance: 2821; Referee: Ray Oliver |

| 17 February 2001 28 | Torquay United | 1 – 0 | Rochdale | Torquay |
| | Hill 23'; Herrera (yellow card) 90'; Rees (yellow card) 90' | Report | Bayliss (yellow card) 83' | Stadium: Plainmoor; Attendance: 2195; Referee: Frazer Stretton |

| 20 February 2001 29 | Rochdale | 0 – 1 | York City | Rochdale |
| | Bayliss (yellow card) 81'; Kyle (yellow card) 84'; Ellis (yellow card) 89' | Report | Emmerson 75'; Nogan (yellow card) 81' | Stadium: Spotland Stadium; Attendance: 2807; Referee: Colin Webster |

| 24 February 2001 30 | Rochdale | 1 – 7 | Shrewsbury Town | Rochdale |
| | Lancashire 11'; Bayliss (yellow card) 65'; Hill (yellow card) 82'; Edwards (yellow card) 90' | Report | Rodgers 2', 71', 77' (yellow card) 46' (yellow-red card) 78'; Tretton 14'; Jemson (yellow card) 36'; Redmile 46'; Lowe 56'; Jagielka 90' (pen.) | Stadium: Spotland Stadium; Attendance: 2647; Referee: Brian Curson |

| 3 March 2001 31 | Southend United | 3 – 0 | Rochdale | Southend |
| | Hutchings (yellow card) 14'; Whelan 30'; Lee 44' (pen.), 57' | Report | Hill (yellow card) 58'; Edwards (red card) 80' | Stadium: Roots Hall; Attendance: 3681; Referee: Paul Alcock |

| 6 March 2001 32 | Hartlepool United | 1 – 1 | Rochdale | Hartlepool |
| | Henderson (yellow card) 33'; Sharp (yellow card) 43'; Aspin (yellow card) 45'; Tinkler (yellow card) 78'; Lormor 88' | Report | Bayliss (yellow card) 33'; Jones (yellow card) 35'; Lancashire (yellow card) 35' (goal) 43'; Hill (yellow card) 38'; Todd (yellow card) 89' | Stadium: Victoria Park; Attendance: 3492; Referee: Trevor Jones |

| 10 March 2001 33 | Rochdale | 0 – 0 | Kidderminster Harriers | Rochdale |
| | Hill (yellow card) 33' | Report | Broughton (yellow card) 35'; Clarkson (yellow card) 71' | Stadium: Spotland Stadium; Attendance: 2552; Referee: Scott Mathieson |

| 17 March 2001 34 | Chesterfield | 1 – 1 | Rochdale | Chesterfield |
| | Williams (yellow card) 61'; Howard 89' | Report | Oliver (yellow card) 28'; Connor (yellow card) 30' (goal) 45' | Stadium: Saltergate Recreation Ground; Attendance: 4338; Referee: Jeff Winter |

| 23 March 2001 35 | Rochdale | 1 – 1 | Cheltenham Town | Rochdale |
| | Coleman (yellow card) 40'; Connor 73' | Report | Grayson 12'; Duff (yellow card) 20' | Stadium: Spotland Stadium; Attendance: 2713; Referee: Mark Clattenburg |

| 27 March 2001 36 | Hull City | 3 – 2 | Rochdale | Hull |
| | Brabin 26'; Edwards 35'; Rowe 69' (pen.) | Report | Flitcroft (yellow card) 11'; Monington (yellow card) 56'; Bayliss 74'; Connor 77' | Stadium: Boothferry Park; Attendance: 7365; Referee: Alan Kaye |

| 3 April 2001 37 | Rochdale | 1 – 1 | Brighton & Hove Albion | Rochdale |
| | Bayliss (yellow card) 34'; Evans (yellow card) 38'; Connor (yellow card) 60'; Todd 90' | Report | Mayo (yellow card) 75'; Carpenter 87' | Stadium: Spotland Stadium; Attendance: 2444; Referee: Peter Walton |

| 10 April 2001 38 | Rochdale | 6 – 0 | Carlisle United | Rochdale |
| | Jones 8'; Todd 22'; Connor 30', 34', 64'; Evans 61' | Report | | Stadium: Spotland Stadium; Attendance: 2892; Referee: Michael Jones |

| 14 April 2001 39 | Macclesfield Town | 0 – 0 | Rochdale | Macclesfield |
| | Keen (yellow card) 84' | Report | Todd (yellow card) 12'; Oliver (yellow card) 36' | Stadium: Moss Rose; Attendance: 2255; Referee: Mike Ryan |

| 16 April 2001 40 | Rochdale | 3 – 0 | Exeter City | Rochdale |
| | Connor 6', 55'; Bayliss 22'; Ford (yellow card) 40' | Report | Roscoe (yellow card) 8' | Stadium: Spotland Stadium; Attendance: 2773; Referee: Paul Robinson |

| 21 April 2001 41 | Barnet | 3 – 0 | Rochdale | London |
| | Heald 16', 57'; Arber 32' | Report | | Stadium: Underhill Stadium; Attendance: 2381; Referee: Trevor Parkes |

| 23 April 2001 42 | Rochdale | 3 – 1 | Lincoln City | Rochdale |
| | Platt 9'; Hill (yellow card) 43'; Connor 60'; Monington 71' | Report | Thorpe 55' | Stadium: Spotland Stadium; Attendance: 2592; Referee: John Brandwood |

| 26 April 2001 43 | Blackpool | 3 – 1 | Rochdale | Blackpool |
| | Clarkson 43'; Reid (yellow card) 47'; Ormerod 62'; Murphy 64' | Report | Flitcroft (yellow card) 15'; Platt (yellow card) 44'; Lancashire 75'; Edwards (red card) 84' | Stadium: Bloomfield Road; Attendance: 5470; Referee: Phil Richards |

| 28 April 2001 44 | Rochdale | 1 – 0 | Mansfield Town | Rochdale |
| | Platt 32' | Report | Disley (yellow card) 69'; Lawrence (yellow card) 70' | Stadium: Spotland Stadium; Attendance: 3114; Referee: Roger Furnandiz |

| 1 May 2001 45 | Rochdale | 2 – 1 | Plymouth Argyle | Rochdale |
| | Monington (yellow card) 24'; Hill (yellow card) 29'; Elliott 54' (o.g.); Connor 58'; Flitcroft (yellow card) 62' (yellow-red card) 78' | Report | Evans 34' (yellow card) 80' | Stadium: Spotland Stadium; Attendance: 4027; Referee: Phil Joslin |

| 5 May 2001 46 | Plymouth Argyle | 0 – 0 | Rochdale | Plymouth |
| | Wills (yellow card) 50' | Report | Bayliss (yellow card) 33'; Flitcroft (yellow card) 38' | Stadium: Home Park; Attendance: 5125; Referee: Phil Dowd |

=== FA Cup ===
| 18 November 2000 1 | Cambridge United | 2 – 1 | Rochdale | Cambridge |
| | Axeldahl 6'; Hansen (yellow card) 80' (goal) 83' | Report | Oliver (yellow card) 1'; Platt 31'; Ware (yellow card) 67'; Hadland (yellow card) 67'; Ford (yellow card) 86' | Stadium: Abbey Stadium; Attendance: 3142; Referee: Mark Cooper |

=== Football League Cup (Worthington Cup) ===
| 22 August 2000 1 | Rochdale | 1 – 1 | Blackburn Rovers | Rochdale |
| | Hill (yellow card) 42'; Bayliss (yellow card) 87'; Ellis 90' | Report | Blake 59'; Flitcroft (yellow card) 68' | Stadium: Spotland Stadium; Attendance: 4873; Referee: Roger Furnandiz |

| 6 September 2000 1 | Blackburn Rovers | 6 – 1 | Rochdale | Blackburn |
| | Duff 27', 90'; Dunn 45' (pen.), 55' (pen.), 65' (pen.); Diawara 57' | Report | Platt 35' | Stadium: Ewood Park; Attendance: 12977; Referee: Bill Burns |

=== Football League Trophy (LDV Vans Trophy) ===
| 5 December 2000 1 | Doncaster Rovers | 3 – 2 | Rochdale | Doncaster |
| | Turner 39' (yellow card) 45'; Penney 59' (pen.); Campbell 92' | Report | Jones 21' (pen.); Ware (yellow card) 31'; Bayliss (yellow card) 75'; Campbell 90' (o.g.); Flitcroft (yellow card) 90' | Stadium: Belle Vue; Attendance: 1453; Referee: Mike Ryan |
