= 2001–02 Rochdale A.F.C. season =

English football club season

Rochdale
2001–02 season
- Chairman: David Kilpatrick
- Manager: Steve Parkin; David Hamilton; John Hollins
- Third Division: 5th
- FA Cup: Second round
- League Cup: Second round
- Top goalscorer: League: Kevin Townson (14); All: Kevin Townson (17)

The 2001–02 season was Rochdale A.F.C.'s 95th in existence and their 28th consecutive in the fourth tier of the English football league, named at the time as the Football League Third Division.

== Statistics ==
No.	Pos	Nat	Player	Total		Third Division		FA Cup		League Cup		League Trophy		Play-offs	
No.	Pos	Nat	Player	Apps	Goals	Apps	Goals	Apps	Goals	Apps	Goals	Apps	Goals	Apps	Goals
1	GK	(Wales) WAL	Neil Edwards	11	0	7 + 0	0	1 + 0	0	1 + 0	0	0 + 0	0	2 + 0	0
2	DF	(Wales) WAL	Wayne Evans	51	0	43 + 0	0	3 + 0	0	2 + 0	0	1 + 0	0	2 + 0	0
3	DF	(England) ENG	Sean McAuley	30	0	23 + 0	0	3 + 0	0	1 + 1	0	2 + 0	0	0 + 0	0
4	DF	(England) ENG	Simon Coleman	13	1	8 + 3	1	0 + 0	0	1 + 0	0	0 + 0	0	0 + 1	0
5	DF	(Wales) WAL	Gareth Griffiths	48	4	41 + 0	4	2 + 0	0	2 + 0	0	1 + 0	0	2 + 0	0
7	MF	(England) ENG	David Flitcroft	43	0	21 + 14	0	1 + 1	0	1 + 1	0	2 + 0	0	2 + 0	0
8	DF	(England) ENG	Paul Ware	9	0	4 + 4	0	0 + 0	0	0 + 1	0	0 + 0	0	0 + 0	0
9	DF	(England) ENG	Michael Oliver	53	8	45 + 0	7	3 + 0	1	2 + 0	0	1 + 0	0	2 + 0	0
10	DF	(England) ENG	Matt Doughty	44	2	32 + 4	1	3 + 0	1	0 + 1	0	2 + 0	0	2 + 0	0
11	MF	(England) ENG	Graeme Atkinson	12	0	8 + 3	0	0 + 1	0	0 + 0	0	0 + 0	0	0 + 0	0
12	DF	(England) ENG	Lee Todd	11	0	8 + 2	0	0 + 0	0	1 + 0	0	0 + 0	0	0 + 0	0
13	GK	(Scotland) SCO	Matt Gilks	22	0	19 + 0	0	2 + 0	0	1 + 0	0	0 + 0	0	0 + 0	0
14	DF	(England) ENG	Tony Ford	20	3	17 + 0	2	0 + 0	0	2 + 0	1	1 + 0	0	0 + 0	0
14	MF	(England) ENG	Paul Simpson	9	6	7 + 0	5	0 + 0	0	0 + 0	0	0 + 0	0	2 + 0	1
15	MF	(Republic of Ireland) IRL	Kieron Durkan	36	1	16 + 14	1	3 + 0	0	2 + 0	0	1 + 0	0	0 + 0	0
16	DF	(England) ENG	Dave Bayliss	12	0	9 + 0	0	1 + 0	0	1 + 0	0	1 + 0	0	0 + 0	0
16	MF	(Republic of Ireland) IRL	Alan McLoughlin	20	1	15 + 3	1	0 + 0	0	0 + 0	0	0 + 0	0	2 + 0	0
18	MF	(England) ENG	Gary Jones	25	6	20 + 0	5	2 + 0	0	2 + 0	0	1 + 0	1	0 + 0	0
18	FW	(Northern Ireland) NIR	Lee McEvilly	20	5	13 + 5	4	0 + 0	0	0 + 0	0	0 + 0	0	2 + 0	1
19	FW	(England) ENG	Kevin Townson	48	17	17 + 24	14	1 + 1	0	0 + 1	2	2 + 0	1	1 + 1	0
20	DF	(England) ENG	Lee Duffy	8	0	1 + 5	0	0 + 0	0	0 + 0	0	1 + 1	0	0 + 0	0
21	FW	(England) ENG	Clive Platt	50	8	41 + 2	7	3 + 0	0	2 + 0	0	1 + 0	1	1 + 0	0
22	MF	(England) ENG	Darren Dunning	5	0	4 + 1	0	0 + 0	0	0 + 0	0	0 + 0	0	0 + 0	0
23	DF	(England) ENG	Stephen Hill	0	0	0 + 0	0	0 + 0	0	0 + 0	0	0 + 0	0	0 + 0	0
24	DF	(England) ENG	Richard Jobson	42	3	34 + 1	3	3 + 0	0	0 + 0	0	2 + 0	0	2 + 0	0
26	FW	(Northern Ireland) NIR	Steve Jones	9	1	6 + 3	1	0 + 0	0	0 + 0	0	0 + 0	0	0 + 0	0
26	FW	(England) ENG	Paul Wheatcroft	6	3	6 + 0	3	0 + 0	0	0 + 0	0	0 + 0	0	0 + 0	0
27	FW	(England) ENG	Paul Connor	22	1	11 + 6	1	2 + 1	0	1 + 0	0	0 + 0	0	0 + 1	0
29	GK	(United States) USA	Marcus Hahnemann	7	0	5 + 0	0	0 + 0	0	0 + 0	0	2 + 0	0	0 + 0	0
30	MF	(Northern Ireland) NIR	Pat McCourt	28	4	10 + 13	4	0 + 2	0	0 + 0	0	0 + 2	0	0 + 1	0
33	FW	(England) ENG	Karl Rose	1	0	0 + 0	0	0 + 0	0	0 + 0	0	1 + 0	0	0 + 0	0
35	GK	(England) ENG	Steve Banks	15	0	15 + 0	0	0 + 0	0	0 + 0	0	0 + 0	0	0 + 0	0

== Competitions ==
=== Football League Third Division ===
11 August 2001 1	Oxford United	1–2	Rochdale	Oxford
	Bolland (yellow card) 36'; Brooks 52'; Guyett (yellow card) 56'; Scott (yellow card) 60'; Stockley (yellow card) 90'	Report	Doughty 30'; Platt (yellow card) 39'; Coleman 66'	Stadium: Kassam Stadium; Attendance: 7842; Referee: David Crick

18 August 2001 2	Rochdale	1–1	Macclesfield Town	Rochdale
	Ford 26'	Report	Glover 18' (pen.)	Stadium: Spotland Stadium; Attendance: 3346; Referee: Mick Fletcher

25 August 2001 3	Plymouth Argyle	1–2	Rochdale	Plymouth
	Coleman 16' (o.g.); McGlinchey (yellow card) 29'; Larrieu (yellow card) 78'	Report	G. Jones 17'; Ford (yellow card) 40'; Connor 77'	Stadium: Home Park; Attendance: 4198; Referee: Rob Harris

27 August 2001 4	Rochdale	2–0	Exeter City	Rochdale
	G. Jones 29' (pen.); Townson 30'	Report	Watson (yellow card) 55'; Cronin (yellow card) 77'	Stadium: Spotland Stadium; Attendance: 3003; Referee: John Brandwood

1 September 2001 5	Carlisle United	1–2	Rochdale	Carlisle
	Hopper (yellow card) 47'; Whitehead (yellow card) 67'; Allan 80'	Report	Oliver 11'; Platt 12' (yellow card) 28'; Evans (yellow card) 45'; Bayliss (yellow card) 77'	Stadium: Brunton Park; Attendance: 3373; Referee: Alan Kaye

8 September 2001 6	Rochdale	2–0	Kidderminster Harriers	Rochdale
	Griffiths 2', 76'	Report		Stadium: Spotland Stadium; Attendance: 2885; Referee: George Cain

15 September 2001 7	Rochdale	2–2	Scunthorpe United	Rochdale
	Griffiths (yellow card) 35'; McAuley (yellow card) 55'; Oliver 59'; G. Jones 81' (pen.); Todd (red card) 82'	Report	Brough 13'; Kell (yellow card) 43'; Beagrie 83' (pen.)	Stadium: Spotland Stadium; Attendance: 3468; Referee: Phil Richards

18 September 2001 8	Hull City	3–1	Rochdale	Hull
	Alexander 28', 51'; Dudfield 63'; Edwards (yellow card) 84'; Whitmore (red card) 90'	Report	Townson 30' (yellow card) 90'	Stadium: Boothferry Park; Attendance: 10213; Referee: Mark Clattenburg

22 September 2001 9	Shrewsbury Town	1–0	Rochdale	Shrewsbury
	Aiston (yellow card) 76'; Rodgers 90'	Report	Oliver (yellow card) 69'; Griffiths (yellow card) 75'	Stadium: Gay Meadow; Attendance: 4612; Referee: Paul Armstrong

25 September 2001 10	Rochdale	2–0	Halifax Town	Rochdale
	Griffiths (yellow card) 18'; Platt 62', 77'	Report	Middleton (yellow card) 63'	Stadium: Spotland Stadium; Attendance: 3410; Referee: Frazer Stretton

29 September 2001 11	Rochdale	3–1	Mansfield Town	Rochdale
	Oliver (yellow card) 15'; Atkinson (yellow card) 22'; Platt 32'; G. Jones 64'; Wheatcroft 81'	Report	Greenacre 90'	Stadium: Spotland Stadium; Attendance: 3963; Referee: Tony Bates

9 October 2001 12	Swansea City	0–1	Rochdale	Swansea
		Report	Ford 31'	Stadium: Vetch Field; Attendance: 3533; Referee: Richard Beeby

13 October 2001 13	Rochdale	0–0	Rushden & Diamonds	Rochdale
	G. Jones (yellow card) 43'	Report	Peters (yellow card) 85'	Stadium: Spotland Stadium; Attendance: 4345; Referee: Colin Webster

20 October 2001 14	Luton Town	0–1	Rochdale	Luton
	Crowe (yellow card) 42'; Nicholls (yellow card) 90'	Report	Griffiths (yellow card) 20'; Wheatcroft 39'	Stadium: Kenilworth Road; Attendance: 7696; Referee: Steve Tomlin

23 October 2001 15	Rochdale	2–2	Cheltenham Town	Rochdale
	Wheatcroft 52' (yellow card) 17' (yellow-red card) 60'; Oliver (yellow card) 65'; Townson 72'	Report	Victory 6', 84'; Banks (yellow card) 25'; Alsop (yellow card) 65'; Grayson (yellow card) 85'	Stadium: Spotland Stadium; Attendance: 3279; Referee: Mike Jones

27 October 2001 16	Leyton Orient	4–2	Rochdale	London
	Ibehre 34' (yellow card) 67'; Minton (yellow card) 37' (goal) 39'; Watts 51'; Joseph 59'; Harris (yellow card) 74'	Report	Townson 77', 90'; Jobson (yellow card) 90'	Stadium: Brisbane Road; Attendance: 4631; Referee: Trevor Parkes

3 November 2001 17	Rochdale	2–0	Torquay United	Rochdale
	Townson 49', 90'	Report	Williams (yellow card) 77'; Woods (yellow card) 90'	Stadium: Spotland Stadium; Attendance: 3078; Referee: Roy Pearson

10 November 2001 18	Bristol Rovers	0–2	Rochdale	Bristol
	Wilson (yellow card) 5'; Astafjevs (yellow card) 33' (yellow-red card) 57'	Report	G. Jones (yellow card) 30' (goal) 70'; Platt 50'	Stadium: Memorial Stadium; Attendance: 5675; Referee: Barry Knight

20 November 2001 19	Darlington	1–0	Rochdale	Darlington
	Clark 78' (pen.)	Report	Townson (red card) 55'; Evans (yellow card) 62'	Stadium: Feethams; Attendance: 3362; Referee: Uriah Rennie

24 November 2001 20	Rochdale	2–2	Lincoln City	Rochdale
	Jobson 43'; Durkan 70'	Report	Hamilton (yellow card) 20'; Gain (yellow card) 60'; Bailey (yellow card) 70'; Battersby 89'; Holmes 90'	Stadium: Spotland Stadium; Attendance: 3139; Referee: Mark Warren

30 November 2001 21	Hartlepool United	1–1	Rochdale	Hartlepool
	Bass 74'	Report	Oliver 59'	Stadium: Victoria Park; Attendance: 4162; Referee: Steve Baines

15 December 2001 22	Rochdale	0–1	Southend United	Rochdale
	Jobson (yellow card) 35'; Platt (yellow card) 80'; Flitcroft (yellow card) 84'	Report	Broad 7'; Rawle (yellow card) 20'; Flahavan (red card) 80'; Bramble (yellow card) 87'	Stadium: Spotland Stadium; Attendance: 2849; Referee: Mark Cowburn

26 December 2001 23	Kidderminster Harriers	4–1	Rochdale	Kidderminster
13:00 GMT	Henriksen 4', 44'; Blake (yellow card) 21' (goal) 51'; Stamps (yellow card) 67'; Bennett 84'	Report	Oliver 38' (yellow card) 64'; McCourt (yellow card) 65'; Connor (yellow card) 66'; Jobson (yellow card) 68'	Stadium: Aggborough Stadium; Attendance: 3856; Referee: Mark Cooper

29 December 2001 24	Exeter City	1–1	Rochdale	Exeter
	Flack (yellow card) 13'; Power (yellow card) 45'; Watson 62'; Roberts (yellow card) 76'	Report	Townson 2'; Platt (yellow card) 50'; McAuley (yellow card) 71'	Stadium: St James Park; Attendance: 2994; Referee: Paul Taylor

12 January 2002 25	Macclesfield Town	0–1	Rochdale	Macclesfield
		Report	Townson 51'	Stadium: Moss Rose; Attendance: 3002; Referee: George Cain

19 January 2002 26	Rochdale	1–1	Oxford United	Rochdale
	McCourt 7'; Griffiths (yellow card) 16'	Report	Quinn (yellow card) 41'; Gray (yellow card) 57'; Moody 83'	Stadium: Spotland Stadium; Attendance: 3355; Referee: Mark Clattenburg

22 January 2002 27	York City	0–0	Rochdale	York
	Basham (yellow card) 76'	Report	Evans (yellow card) 39'; Flitcroft (yellow card) 52'; Platt (red card) 59'; Connor (yellow card) 80'	Stadium: Bootham Crescent; Attendance: 2317; Referee: Paul Danson

26 January 2002 28	Rochdale	2–0	Swansea City	Rochdale
	Oliver 40'; Sharp 45' (o.g.)	Report	O'Leary (yellow card) 53'	Stadium: Spotland Stadium; Attendance: 2819; Referee: John Brandwood

29 January 2002 29	Rochdale	1–1	Carlisle United	Rochdale
	Griffiths 62'; Banks (yellow card) 62'	Report	Halliday 18'; Foran (yellow card) 75'	Stadium: Spotland Stadium; Attendance: 3008; Referee: Steve Baines

2 February 2002 30	Mansfield Town	3–1	Rochdale	Mansfield
	Greenacre 37', 86' (yellow card) 40'; Pemberton 38'	Report	Oliver 89'	Stadium: Field Mill; Attendance: 4876; Referee: Howard Webb

5 February 2002 31	Rochdale	5–4	York City	Rochdale
	Townson 16' (pen.), 45'; McEvilly 49'; Jobson 54', 77'	Report	Brass 13'; Edmondson (yellow card) 15'; Duffield 21' (yellow card) 60'; Brass (yellow card) 44'; Bullock 51' (yellow card) 56'; Proctor 83'	Stadium: Spotland Stadium; Attendance: 2823; Referee: Graham Frankland

9 February 2002 32	Rochdale	1–0	Luton Town	Rochdale
	McCourt 12'; Flitcroft (yellow card) 32'; Griffiths (yellow card) 44'; McEvilly (yellow card) 67'; Oliver (yellow card) 67'; Doughty (yellow card) 72'; Townson (yellow card) 89'	Report	Bayliss (yellow card) 5' (red card) 0'; Nicholls (yellow card) 10'; Howard (yellow card) 23'; Perrett (yellow card) 88'	Stadium: Spotland Stadium; Attendance: 4306; Referee: Matt Messias

16 February 2002 33	Rushden & Diamonds	1–1	Rochdale	Irthlingborough
	Hanlon (yellow card) 48'; Tillson (yellow card) 50'; Peters (yellow card) 53'; Lowe (yellow card) 69'; Hall 88'	Report	McEvilly (yellow card) 9'; Evans (yellow card) 29'; Townson 90'	Stadium: Nene Park; Attendance: 4672; Referee: Joe Ross

23 February 2002 34	Scunthorpe United	2–1	Rochdale	Scunthorpe
	Graves 27', 38'; Stanton (yellow card) 78'	Report	S. Jones 10'; Townson (yellow card) 49'; Todd (yellow card) 67'; Flitcroft (yellow card) 90'	Stadium: Glanford Park; Attendance: 4521; Referee: Peter Walton

2 March 2002 35	Rochdale	1–0	Shrewsbury Town	Rochdale
	Griffiths 80'	Report	Murray (yellow card) 4'; Wilding (yellow card) 79'	Stadium: Spotland Stadium; Attendance: 3353; Referee: Roy Pearson

5 March 2002 36	Halifax Town	1–2	Rochdale	Halifax
	Stoneman (yellow card) 12' (yellow-red card) 39'; Redfearn 32'; Mitchell (yellow card) 90'	Report	McEvilly (yellow card) 63' (goal) 81'; McCourt 90'	Stadium: The Shay; Attendance: 2825; Referee: Mark Cowburn

9 March 2002 37	Southend United	0–0	Rochdale	Southend
		Report	McEvilly (yellow card) 45'; Platt (yellow card) 75'	Stadium: Roots Hall; Attendance: 3429; Referee: David Crick

16 March 2002 38	Rochdale	0–0	Hartlepool United	Rochdale
		Report	Watson (yellow card) 21'; Clarke (yellow card) 50'	Stadium: Spotland Stadium; Attendance: 3219; Referee: Mark Cooper

23 March 2002 39	Cheltenham Town	1–1	Rochdale	Cheltenham
	Williams 3'	Report	Evans (yellow card) 52'; Platt 53'; Doughty (yellow card) 76'	Stadium: Whaddon Road; Attendance: 4643; Referee: Rob Harris

26 March 2002 40	Rochdale	1–3	Plymouth Argyle	Rochdale
	Simpson 54'	Report	Wotton (yellow card) 55'; Hodges (yellow card) 64' (goal) 83'; Keith 66'; Coughlan 81'	Stadium: Spotland Stadium; Attendance: 4457; Referee: Mike Pike

30 March 2002 41	Rochdale	3–0	Leyton Orient	Rochdale
	McEvilly 6'; Simpson 30'; Oliver (yellow card) 44'; Townson 82'	Report	Martin (yellow card) 15'; Smith (yellow card) 24'	Stadium: Spotland Stadium; Attendance: 3021; Referee: Graham Laws

1 April 2002 42	Torquay United	3–0	Rochdale	Torquay
	Bedeau 40'; Martin (yellow card) 45'; Canoville 46'; Graham 65'	Report	Durkan (yellow card) 31'; Flitcroft (yellow card) 35'; Griffiths (yellow card) 42'	Stadium: Plainmoor; Attendance: 3136; Referee: Ray Olivier

6 April 2002 43	Rochdale	3–1	Darlington	Rochdale
	Griffiths (yellow card) 1'; Platt 7'; McEvilly 27'; Simpson 35'	Report	Conlon 4'; Reed (yellow card) 27'; Porter (yellow card) 70'	Stadium: Spotland Stadium; Attendance: 3055; Referee: Alan Butler

9 April 2002 44	Rochdale	3–2	Hull City	Rochdale
	McEvilly (yellow card) 10'; Oliver 32'; McCourt 57'; Townson 64'	Report	Holt (yellow card) 12'; Dudfield 26', 45'; Greaves (yellow card) 79'	Stadium: Spotland Stadium; Attendance: 3433; Referee: Trevor Parkes

13 April 2002 45	Lincoln City	1–1	Rochdale	Lincoln
	Thorpe 30'; Cameron (yellow card) 54'	Report	Simpson 81'	Stadium: Sincil Bank; Attendance: 5849; Referee: Grant Hegley

20 April 2002 46	Rochdale	2–1	Bristol Rovers	Rochdale
	Simpson 63'; McEvilly (yellow card) 65'; McLoughlin 86' (pen.)	Report	Thomas 29'	Stadium: Spotland Stadium; Attendance: 5292; Referee: Mark Cowburn

==== Play-Offs ====
27 April 2002 1st Leg	Rushden & Diamonds	2–2	Rochdale	Irthlingborough
	Wardley 34'; Butterworth 73'; Lowe (yellow card) 75'; Angell (yellow card) 90'	Report	McEvilly 8'; Simpson (yellow card) 33' (goal) 57'; Oliver (yellow card) 38'; Griffiths (yellow card) 76'	Stadium: Nene Park; Attendance: 6,015; Referee: Graham Barber

30 April 2002 2nd Leg	Rochdale	1–2	Rushden & Diamonds	Rochdale
	Peters 65' (o.g.)	Report	Lowe 67'; Hall 76'	Stadium: Spotland Stadium; Attendance: 8,485; Referee: Roger Furnandiz

=== FA Cup ===
17 November 2001 1	Tamworth	1–1	Rochdale	Tamworth
	Wilson (yellow card) 21' (goal) 43'	Report	Doughty 5'	Stadium: The Lamb Ground; Attendance: 3,119; Referee: Alan Kaye

27 November 2001 1 (replay)	Rochdale	1–0	Tamworth	Rochdale
	Jones (yellow card) 70'; Durkan (yellow card) 85'; Oliver 90'	Report	Gould (yellow card) 43'	Stadium: Spotland Stadium; Attendance: 2,709; Referee: Alan Kaye

8 December 2001 2	Blackpool	2–0	Rochdale	Blackpool
	Murphy 22'; Simpson 89'	Report	Jobson (yellow card) 86'	Stadium: Bloomfield Road; Attendance: 5,191; Referee: Ray Olivier

=== Football League Cup (Worthington Cup) ===
21 August 2001 1	Huddersfield Town	0–1	Rochdale	Huddersfield
		Report	Ford 20'	Stadium: Kirklees Stadium; Attendance: 3,995; Referee: Mike Ryan

11 September 2001 2	Rochdale	2–2 (5–6 p)	Fulham	Rochdale
	Bayliss (yellow card) 40'; Townson 74', 102'	Report	Boa Morte 17'; Finnan (yellow card) 53'; Brevett 120'	Stadium: Spotland Stadium; Attendance: 6,303; Referee: Roy Pearson
	Penalties
	Jones (penalty scored); Townson (penalty scored); McAuley (penalty scored); Flitcroft (penalty missed); Oliver (penalty missed); Evans (penalty scored); Griffiths (penalty scored); Platt (penalty missed); Bayliss (penalty missed)		Clark (penalty scored); Legwinski (penalty scored); Finnan (penalty scored); Davis (penalty missed); Hayles (penalty missed); Melville (penalty scored); Brevett (penalty scored); Taylor (penalty missed); Boa Morte (penalty scored)

=== Football League Trophy (LDV Vans Trophy) ===
16 October 2001 1	Rochdale	2–0	Southport	Rochdale
	Platt 37'; Jones 88' (pen.)	Report	Elam (yellow card) 59'	Stadium: Spotland Stadium; Attendance: 1,411; Referee: Graham Salisbury

30 October 2001 1	Rochdale	1–2	Port Vale	Rochdale
	Townson 49'; Flitcroft (yellow card) 55'	Report	Carragher (yellow card) 23'; Burton-Godwin 53' (pen.); Armstrong 66'; Killen (yellow card) 68' (yellow-red card) 72'	Stadium: Spotland Stadium; Attendance: 1,639; Referee: Mike Ryan
