= 2003–04 Rochdale A.F.C. season =

English football club season

Rochdale
2003–04 season
- Chairman: David Kilpatrick
- Manager: Alan Buckley/Steve Parkin
- League Division Three: 21st
- FA Cup: Second Round
- League Cup: First Round
- Top goalscorer: League: Kevin Townson; All: Kevin Townson

The 2003–04 season was Rochdale A.F.C.'s 97th in existence and their 30th consecutive in the fourth tier of the English football league, named at the time as the Football League Third Division.

== Statistics ==
No.	Pos	Nat	Player	Total		League Division 3		FA Cup		League Cup		League Trophy	
No.	Pos	Nat	Player	Apps	Goals	Apps	Goals	Apps	Goals	Apps	Goals	Apps	Goals
1	GK	(Wales) WAL	Neil Edwards	37	0	34+0	0	2+0	0	0+0	0	1+0	0
2	DF	(Wales) WAL	Wayne Evans	49	0	45+0	0	2+0	0	1+0	0	1+0	0
3	DF	(England) ENG	Michael Simpkins	30	0	25+2	0	1+0	0	1+0	0	1+0	0
4	MF	(Republic of Ireland) IRL	Sean McClare	41	0	33+5	0	1+0	0	1+0	0	1+0	0
5	DF	(Wales) WAL	Gareth Griffiths	35	1	29+4	1	1+0	0	0+0	0	1+0	0
6	DF	(England) ENG	Daryl Burgess	38	0	33+2	0	2+0	0	1+0	0	0+0	0
7	MF	(New Zealand) NZL	Leo Bertos	43	10	40+0	9	1+0	1	1+0	0	1+0	0
8	MF	(England) ENG	Chris Beech	16	0	9+5	0	1+0	0	1+0	0	0+0	0
9	FW	(England) ENG	Andy Bishop	11	1	8+2	1	1+0	0	0+0	0	0+0	0
9	FW	(England) ENG	Grant Holt	14	3	14+0	3	0+0	0	0+0	0	0+0	0
9	MF	(England) ENG	Chris Shuker	15	1	14+0	1	0+0	0	1+0	0	0+0	0
10	DF	(England) ENG	Matt Doughty	35	0	25+6	0	1+1	0	1+0	0	1+0	0
11	MF	(England) ENG	Ged Brannan	13	1	11+0	1	1+0	0	0+0	0	1+0	0
11	MF	(England) ENG	Gary Jones	27	4	26+0	4	1+0	0	0+0	0	0+0	0
11	MF	(England) ENG	Martin Pemberton	1	0	1+0	0	0+0	0	0+0	0	0+0	0
12	FW	(Guadeloupe) GLP	Mickael Antoine-Curier	10	1	5+3	1	0+1	0	0+0	0	0+1	0
12	MF	(England) ENG	Kevin Donovan	7	0	4+3	0	0+0	0	0+0	0	0+0	0
12	DF	(England) ENG	Danny Livesey	13	0	11+2	0	0+0	0	0+0	0	0+0	0
13	GK	(Scotland) SCO	Matt Gilks	14	0	12+0	0	0+1	0	1+0	0	0+0	0
14	MF	(Sweden) SWE	Kangana Ndiwa	1	0	0+1	0	0+0	0	0+0	0	0+0	0
15	MF	(England) ENG	Robert Betts	6	2	4+1	2	0+0	0	0+1	0	0+0	0
15	DF	(England) ENG	Shaun Smith	13	0	13+0	0	0+0	0	0+0	0	0+0	0
15	MF	(England) ENG	Jeff Smith	1	0	1+0	0	0+0	0	0+0	0	0+0	0
16	DF	(England) ENG	Greg Heald	10	1	10+0	1	0+0	0	0+0	0	0+0	0
16	MF	(Scotland) SCO	Craig Strachan	1	0	0+1	0	0+0	0	0+0	0	0+0	0
17	MF	(Northern Ireland) NIR	Paddy McCourt	28	2	6+18	2	2+0	0	0+1	0	0+1	0
18	FW	(Northern Ireland) NIR	Lee McEvilly	32	6	15+15	6	1+1	0	0+0	0	0+0	0
19	FW	(England) ENG	Kevin Townson	37	12	17+16	10	1+1	1	0+1	1	1+0	0
20	MF	(Republic of Ireland) IRL	Willo Flood	6	0	6+0	0	0+0	0	0+0	0	0+0	0
23	DF	(England) ENG	Stephen Hill	1	0	1+0	0	0+0	0	0+0	0	0+0	0
26	DF	(England) ENG	Simon Grand	21	0	11+6	0	2+0	0	1+0	0	1+0	0
27	FW	(England) ENG	Paul Connor	26	6	21+3	6	1+0	0	1+0	0	0+0	0
28	FW	(Northern Ireland) NIR	Rory Patterson	9	0	3+4	0	0+1	0	0+0	0	1+0	0
29	DF	(England) ENG	Scott Warner	14	1	10+4	1	0+0	0	0+0	0	0+0	0
38	MF	(England) ENG	Neil Redfearn	9	0	9+0	0	0+0	0	0+0	0	0+0	0

== League Division Three ==
9 August 2003 1	Rochdale	1–3	Yeovil Town	Rochdale
	Grand (yellow card) 17'; McClare (yellow card) 31'; Shuker (yellow card) 37'; Connor 45' (yellow card) 45'; Burgess (yellow card) 54'	Report	Gall 26', 67'; Johnson 55'; Rodrigues (yellow card) 57'; Gosling (yellow card) 62'	Stadium: Spotland Stadium; Attendance: 4,611; Referee: Mark Warren

16 August 2003 2	Bristol Rovers	0–0	Rochdale	Bristol
	Barrett (yellow card) 14' (yellow-red card) 45'; Anderson (yellow card) 16'	Report	Shuker (yellow card) 71'; Grand (yellow card) 83'	Stadium: Memorial Stadium; Attendance: 7,575; Referee: Paul Taylor

23 August 2003 3	Rochdale	2–2	Cambridge United	Rochdale
	Grand (yellow card) 37'; Burgess (yellow card) 45'; McEvilly 67' (pen.); Shuker (red card) 67'; Connor 79'	Report	Revell 32'; Kitson 38' (yellow card) 88'; Walker (yellow card) 72'; Tann (yellow card) 90'; Angus (yellow card) 90'	Stadium: Spotland Stadium; Attendance: 2,204; Referee: Kevin Friend

25 August 2003 4	Torquay United	1–3	Rochdale	Torquay
	Hockley (yellow card) 53' (yellow-red card) 74'; Van Heusden (yellow card) 59'; Graham 75'; Fowler (yellow card) 79'; Gritton (yellow card) 87'	Report	Simpkins (yellow card) 43' (yellow-red card) 45'; McEvilly 59' (pen.) (yellow card) 90'; Betts 63', 78' (yellow card) 64'; Gilks (yellow card) 90'	Stadium: Plainmoor; Attendance: 3,003; Referee: Trevor Kettle

30 August 2003 5	Rochdale	4–2	Darlington	Rochdale
	McEvilly 37' (pen.), 41'; Connor 59'; Bertos 65'	Report	McGurk 30'; Keltie (yellow card) 32'; Pearson 43'; Robson (yellow card) 60'	Stadium: Spotland Stadium; Attendance: 2,518; Referee: Paul Robinson

6 September 2003 6	York City	1–2	Rochdale	York
	Wise (red card) 70'; Wilford 73'	Report	Townson 15'; Bertos 19'; Simpkins (yellow card) 64'; Connor (red card) 70'; Griffiths (yellow card) 86'; Betts (yellow card) 90'	Stadium: Bootham Crescent; Attendance: 3,982; Referee: Martin Atkinson

13 September 2003 7	Carlisle United	3–2	Rochdale	Carlisle
	Simpson 10'; Foran 17'; McGill 22'; Byrne (yellow card) 90'	Report	McClare (yellow card) 48'; Connor 76'; Townson 79'	Stadium: Brunton Park; Attendance: 4,532; Referee: Mike Ryan

16 September 2003 8	Rochdale	1–1	Huddersfield Town	Rochdale
	Connor 1'; Townson (yellow card) 8'; Brannan (yellow card) 75'; Simpkins (yellow card) 86'; Burgess (yellow card) 90'	Report	Worthington 23' (yellow card) 86'	Stadium: Spotland Stadium; Attendance: 4,626; Referee: Howard Webb

20 September 2003 9	Rochdale	0–2	Hull City	Rochdale
	Burgess (yellow card) 41'	Report	Green 63'; Burgess 67'; Elliott (yellow card) 72'	Stadium: Spotland Stadium; Attendance: 4,215; Referee: Alan Kaye

27 September 2003 10	Lincoln City	1–1	Rochdale	Lincoln
	Mayo (yellow card) 15'; Richardson 44'; Futcher (yellow card) 90'	Report	Burgess (yellow card) 23'; Antoine-Curier 40'; McEvilly (red card) 53'; Bertos (yellow card) 87'	Stadium: Sincil Bank; Attendance: 4,141; Referee: Eddie Ilderton

30 September 2003 11	Macclesfield Town	2–1	Rochdale	Macclesfield
	Welch (yellow card) 66'; Burgess 67' (o.g.); Whitaker 74'	Report	Evans (yellow card) 40'; Shuker 51'; Brannan (yellow card) 71'; Simpkins (yellow card) 73'	Stadium: Moss Rose; Attendance: 2,152; Referee: Lee Probert

4 October 2003 12	Rochdale	2–0	Scunthorpe United	Rochdale
	Bertos 82'; Brannan 89' (pen.)	Report	Kell (red card) 38'; Beagrie (yellow card) 39'; Russell (yellow card) 88'; Sparrow (yellow card) 90'	Stadium: Spotland Stadium; Attendance: 2,838; Referee: Kevin Wright

11 October 2003 13	Rochdale	1–1	Northampton Town	Rochdale
	Townson (yellow card) 69' (goal) 72'	Report	Smith 51'; Hargreaves (yellow card) 51'; Burgess (yellow card) 87'	Stadium: Spotland Stadium; Attendance: 2,710; Referee: Colin Webster

18 October 2003 14	Cheltenham Town	0–2	Rochdale	Cheltenham
	Finnigan (yellow card) 49'; McCann (yellow card) 90'	Report	Townson 31'; Bertos 85'	Stadium: Whaddon Road; Attendance: 3,105; Referee: Frazer Stretton

21 October 2003 15	Doncaster Rovers	2–1	Rochdale	Doncaster
	Tierney 2'; Brown 75'; Albrighton (yellow card) 81'	Report	Townson 4'; Burgess (yellow card) 53'; Bertos (yellow card) 68'; Simpkins (yellow card) 79'; Evans (yellow card) 90'	Stadium: Belle Vue; Attendance: 5,890; Referee: Mike Thorpe

25 October 2003 16	Rochdale	0–1	Swansea City	Rochdale
	Simpkins (yellow card) 45'; Burgess (yellow card) 51'	Report	Wilson 16'; Nardiello (yellow card) 54'	Stadium: Spotland Stadium; Attendance: 2,646; Referee: Mike Pike

1 November 2003 17	Leyton Orient	2–1	Rochdale	London
	Lockwood 23' (pen.); Newey (yellow card) 32'; Hunt (yellow card) 34'; Alexander 88'	Report	McEvilly (yellow card) 42' (goal) 59' (pen.); Burgess (yellow card) 47'; Shuker (yellow card) 76'; McCourt (yellow card) 87'	Stadium: Brisbane Road; Attendance: 3,623; Referee: Iain Williamson

15 November 2003 18	Rochdale	0–1	Kidderminster Harriers	Rochdale
	Bertos (yellow card) 54'; Griffiths (yellow card) 56'	Report	Gadsby 35'; Hatswell (yellow card) 54'	Stadium: Spotland Stadium; Attendance: 2,498; Referee: Phil Prosser

22 November 2003 19	Southend United	4–0	Rochdale	Southend
	Bramble 34', 36' (yellow card) 58'; Corbett 67' (pen.); Constantine 90'	Report	Grand (yellow card) 59'; Bertos (yellow card) 78'; McClare (red card) 85'	Stadium: Roots Hall; Attendance: 3,169; Referee: Steve Tomlin

29 November 2003 20	Rochdale	1–2	Oxford United	Rochdale
	Jones 54'; Simpkins (yellow card) 77'	Report	Basham 30'; Alsop 51' (yellow card) 62'; Whitehead (yellow card) 75'	Stadium: Spotland Stadium; Attendance: 2,282; Referee: Mark Cooper

13 December 2003 21	Bury	1–2	Rochdale	Bury
	Dunfield 49'	Report	Bishop 18'; Evans (yellow card) 67'; Simpkins (yellow card) 78'; Townson 83'	Stadium: Gigg Lane; Attendance: 3,646; Referee: Graham Laws

20 December 2003 22	Rochdale	1–0	Boston United	Rochdale
	Griffiths 42'; Townson (yellow card) 87'	Report	Rusk (yellow card) 9'; Boyd (yellow card) 36'; Beevers (red card) 74'; Weatherstone (yellow card) 82'	Stadium: Spotland Stadium; Attendance: 2,049; Referee: Nigel Miller

26 December 2003 23	Mansfield Town	1–0	Rochdale	Mansfield
	Larkin 56'	Report	Jones (yellow card) 42'; Simpkins (yellow card) 90'	Stadium: Field Mill; Attendance: 6,963; Referee: Paul Robinson

28 December 2003 24	Rochdale	1–2	York City	Rochdale
	Simpkins (yellow card) 40'; Evans (yellow card) 43'; Townson 49' (pen.); Grand (yellow card) 61'; Beech (yellow card) 65'	Report	Edmondson (yellow card) 22'; Nogan 28', 76'; Smith (yellow card) 35'; Shaw (yellow card) 90'	Stadium: Spotland Stadium; Attendance: 2,764; Referee: Mike Ryan

3 January 2004 25	Rochdale	1–0	Torquay United	Rochdale
	McClare (yellow card) 29'; Townson 36' (pen.)	Report	Hockley (yellow card) 49'; Hill (yellow card) 53'; Woods (yellow card) 82'; Canoville (yellow card) 87'	Stadium: Spotland Stadium; Attendance: 2,559; Referee: Martin Atkinson

10 January 2004 26	Yeovil Town	1–0	Rochdale	Yeovil
	Williams 13'	Report	Burgess (yellow card) 49'; McCourt (yellow card) 83'	Stadium: Huish Park; Attendance: 5,806; Referee: Lee Probert

17 January 2004 27	Rochdale	2–2	Bristol Rovers	Rochdale
	McCourt 20'; Townson 37'	Report	Doughty 74' (o.g.); Agogo 83'	Stadium: Spotland Stadium; Attendance: 2,497; Referee: Paul Danson

24 January 2004 28	Cambridge United	0–0	Rochdale	Cambridge
	Murray (yellow card) 65'	Report	Townson (yellow card) 32'	Stadium: Abbey Stadium; Attendance: 3,221; Referee: Richard Beeby

31 January 2004 29	Darlington	1–0	Rochdale	Darlington
	Hughes 80'; McGurk (yellow card) 90'	Report	Holt (yellow card) 12'; Simpkins (yellow card) 45'	Stadium: The Darlington Arena; Attendance: 5,689; Referee: Alan Butler

7 February 2004 30	Rochdale	3–0	Mansfield Town	Rochdale
	Jones 12' (pen.); Connor 27'; McClare (yellow card) 33'; Bertos 54'; Burgess (yellow card) 58'	Report	Pilkington (yellow card) 11'; Lawrence (yellow card) 72'	Stadium: Spotland Stadium; Attendance: 3,157; Referee: Tony Bates

14 February 2004 31	Northampton Town	3–1	Rochdale	Northampton
	Hargreaves (yellow card) 56' (goal) 69'; Reid 80'; Vieira 86'	Report	Simpkins (yellow card) 25'; Townson 32'; Jones (yellow card) 61'; Livesey (yellow card) 68'	Stadium: Sixfields Stadium; Attendance: 4,540; Referee: Ray Olivier

21 February 2004 32	Rochdale	0–0	Cheltenham Town	Rochdale
	Griffiths (yellow card) 35'	Report	Duff (yellow card) 86'	Stadium: Spotland Stadium; Attendance: 2,449; Referee: Trevor Parkes

6 March 2004 33	Boston United	2–0	Rochdale	Boston
	Bennett (yellow card) 18'; Ellender 20'; Jones 76'; Chapman (yellow card) 90'	Report	Doughty (yellow card) 50'; Smith (yellow card) 51'; McClare (yellow card) 64'; Livesey (red card) 75'; Holt (yellow card) 90'	Stadium: York Street; Attendance: 2,466; Referee: Colin Webster

9 March 2004 34	Swansea City	1–1	Rochdale	Swansea
	Iriekpen (yellow card) 36'; Maylett 78'; Pritchard (yellow card) 88'	Report	Bertos 26' (yellow card) 76'	Stadium: Vetch Field; Attendance: 5,819; Referee: David Crick

13 March 2004 35	Rochdale	0–0	Bury	Rochdale
	Griffiths (yellow card) 22'	Report	Woodthorpe (yellow card) 18'; Challinor (yellow card) 26'; Nugent (yellow card) 29'; Duxbury (yellow card) 45'	Stadium: Spotland Stadium; Attendance: 4,225; Referee: Alan Kaye

16 March 2004 36	Huddersfield Town	1–1	Rochdale	Huddersfield
	Lloyd 49'; Sodje (yellow card) 73'; Holdsworth (yellow card) 80'; Carss (yellow card) 82'	Report	Bertos 39'; Holt (yellow card) 45'	Stadium: Kirklees Stadium; Attendance: 10,884; Referee: Mark Clattenburg

20 March 2004 37	Rochdale	2–0	Carlisle United	Rochdale
	Redfearn (yellow card) 3'; Jones 34' (pen.); Holt 64'; Bertos (yellow card) 77'	Report	Boyd (yellow card) 18'; Glennon (red card) 32'; Gray (yellow card) 60'	Stadium: Spotland Stadium; Attendance: 4,755; Referee: Brian Curson

27 March 2004 38	Hull City	1–0	Rochdale	Hull
	Delaney 79'	Report	Doughty (yellow card) 56'; Heald (yellow card) 83'	Stadium: KC Stadium; Attendance: 16,050; Referee: Andre Marriner

30 March 2004 39	Rochdale	1–1	Doncaster Rovers	Rochdale
	Smith (yellow card) 25'; Holt (yellow card) 31'; Jones (yellow card) 65'; Heald (yellow card) 70'; McEvilly 73'	Report	Ryan (yellow card) 72'; Albrighton 90'	Stadium: Spotland Stadium; Attendance: 4,601; Referee: Keith Hill

3 April 2004 40	Rochdale	0–3	Lincoln City	Rochdale
	Jones (yellow card) 85'	Report	Taylor-Fletcher 58', 67'; Green (yellow card) 62'; Yeo 66'; Ellison (yellow card) 71'	Stadium: Spotland Stadium; Attendance: 4,224; Referee: Scott Mathieson

10 April 2004 41	Scunthorpe United	2–2	Rochdale	Scunthorpe
	MacLean 5' (yellow card) 53'; Butler 22'; Sparrow (yellow card) 32'; Torpey (yellow card) 36'; Featherstone (yellow card) 40'; Stanton (yellow card) 43'; Barwick (yellow card) 85'	Report	Bertos 3' (yellow card) 90'; Holt (yellow card) 22'; Warner 24'; Flood (yellow card) 63'; Redfearn (yellow card) 64'; Burgess (yellow card) 68'	Stadium: Glanford Park; Attendance: 3,564; Referee: Trevor Kettle

12 April 2004 42	Rochdale	1–2	Macclesfield Town	Rochdale
	Heald 32' (yellow card) 80'	Report	Widdrington (yellow card) 52'; Tipton 62', 82'	Stadium: Spotland Stadium; Attendance: 4,942; Referee: Mark Cowburn

17 April 2004 43	Rochdale	3–0	Leyton Orient	Rochdale
	Holt 23', 58'; McCourt 90'	Report		Stadium: Spotland Stadium; Attendance: 2,417; Referee: George Cain

24 April 2004 44	Kidderminster Harriers	0–1	Rochdale	Kidderminster
		Report	Bertos 38'; Smith (yellow card) 82'	Stadium: Aggborough Stadium; Attendance: 3,580; Referee: Mike Pike

1 May 2004 45	Rochdale	1–1	Southend United	Rochdale
	Jones 58'	Report	Constantine 48'; Bramble (yellow card) 62'	Stadium: Spotland Stadium; Attendance: 3,591; Referee: Phil Prosser

8 May 2004 46	Oxford United	2–0	Rochdale	Oxford
	Basham 33'; Whitehead 39'	Report		Stadium: Kassam Stadium; Attendance: 5,134; Referee: Barry Knight

== FA Cup ==
8 November 2003 1	Bury	1–2	Rochdale	Bury
	Connell (yellow card) 45'; Singh (yellow card) 55'; Porter 71 ' O'Neill (yellow card) 90'	Report	Bertos 27' (yellow card) 74'; Townson 50' (yellow card) 51'; Brannan (yellow card) 58'	Stadium: Gigg Lane; Attendance: 5,464; Referee: Mick Fletcher

6 December 2003 2	Rochdale	0–2	Luton Town	Rochdale
	Jones (yellow card) 27'; Simpkins (yellow card) 65'	Report	Robinson 20' (yellow card) 31'; Holmes (yellow card) 47'; Mansell 77'	Stadium: Spotland Stadium; Attendance: 2,807; Referee: Andy Hall

== League Cup ==
9 August 2003 1	Stoke City	2–1	Rochdale	Stoke
	Iwelumo 13'; Goodfellow 90'	Report	McClare (yellow card) 41'; Shuker (yellow card) 67'; Townson 76'	Stadium: Britannia Stadium; Attendance: 4,687; Referee: Scott Mathieson

== League Trophy ==
14 October 2003 1	Carlisle United	2–0	Rochdale	Carlisle
	Rundle 39'; Wake 89'; Andrews (yellow card) 90'	Report	Simpkins (yellow card) 59'	Stadium: Brunton Park; Attendance: 1,828; Referee: Tony Leake
