= Scott Emerson =

Scott Emerson may refer to:

- Scott Shields Emerson, American biostatistician
- Scott Emerson (politician) (born 1964), Australian consultant, radio host, and politician
- Scott Emerson (baseball) (born 1971), American baseball player

== See also ==
- Scott Emmerson
