= Steve Jones (footballer, born 1976) =

Northern Irish footballer (born 1976)

Personal information
- Full name: Stephen Graham Jones
- Date of birth: 25 October 1976 (age 50)
- Place of birth: Derry, Northern Ireland
- Height: 5 ft 10 in (1.78 m)
- Positions: Right winger; striker

Team information
- Current team: Malpas Football Club (Player Manager)

Senior career*
Years	Team	Apps	(Gls)
199?–1995	Chadderton	1	(?)
1995–1996	Blackpool	0	(0)
1996–1997	Bury	0	(0)
1997–1999	Sligo Rovers	46	(6)
1999	Bray Wanderers	3	(0)
1999	Chorley	4	(?)
1999–2001	Leigh RMI	82	(37)
2001–2006	Crewe Alexandra	158	(39)
2002	→ Rochdale (loan)	9	(0)
2006–2009	Burnley	58	(6)
2008	→ Crewe Alexandra (loan)	4	(1)
2008	→ Huddersfield Town (loan)	4	(0)
2008–2009	→ Bradford City (loan)	26	(3)
2009–2011	Walsall	43	(9)
2011	→ Motherwell (loan)	12	(1)
2011	Droylsden	1	(1)
2011–2013	AFC Telford United	45	(13)
2013–2014	Airbus UK Broughton	22	(5)
2014–2019	Nantwich Town	6	(0)
2019–2020	Whitchurch Alport	14	(6)
2020–2020	Alsager Town	2	(1)
2023-	Malpas Football Club		

International career^{‡}
2001	England C	2	(1)
2003	Northern Ireland B	1	(1)
2003–2007	Northern Ireland	29	(1)
- * Club domestic league appearances and goals as of 17:00, 14 March 2020 (UTC) ‡ National team caps and goals as of 00:21, 5 April 2012 (UTC)

Stephen Graham Jones (born 25 October 1976) is a Northern Irish footballer who plays for Sandbach United football club. He has been capped 29 times by Northern Ireland and played for 20 clubs in England, Ireland, Scotland and Wales.

== Club career ==
=== Early career ===
Jones was born in Derry, Northern Ireland and moved to Manchester with his family at age 13. In his late teens, he played for Chadderton in the North West Counties Division One before signing for Blackpool in July 1995. After spending time playing for Blackpool's youth and reserve teams, he signed for Bury on a free transfer in July 1996. Unable to settle at Bury and frustrated by the lack of first-team opportunities, Jones decided to move to the Republic of Ireland and sign for League of Ireland side Sligo Rovers in July 1997, stating that Rovers manager Nicky Reid's offer of a full-time contract was what ultimately made up his mind.

On 30 August 1997, he made his debut for The Bit o' Red in the league match against Bohemians, scoring just before half-time in the 2–2 draw at The Showgrounds. He spent almost two seasons with Sligo and won the League of Ireland Cup after playing in the final against Shelbourne in February 1998. Overall, he played 46 games and scored 6 goals for Sligo before moving to Bray Wanderers in January 1999. Jones made his debut for Bray on 22 January, playing in the 0–0 league draw with Finn Harps at Carlisle Grounds. Later that year, Jones was homesick and moved back to England, later having a brief spell with Northern Premier League side Chorley where he played in the last four games of the season for The Magpies.

=== Leigh RMI ===
After Chorley were relegated at the end of the 1998–99 season, Jones signed for fellow Northern Premier League side Leigh RMI in August 1999. This came after he impressed RMI manager Steve Waywell in the final home game of the previous season against Chorley. He had a successful first season with The Railwaymen, scoring 18 goals in 40 games that helped RMI gain promotion to the Football Conference. Jones attracted interest from several clubs during the summer, but he ultimately signed a new four-year deal at Leigh, stating he was happier than he had been at any time in his playing career and his heart was with Leigh.

On 19 August 2000, Jones started in Leigh's first game in the Conference, playing the full 90 minutes in a 2–1 defeat by fellow newly promoted side Dagenham & Redbridge. He won a penalty after clumsy challenge from Ashley Vickers, which led to Tony Black scoring RMI's goal. He played in the 3–0 FA Cup first round defeat by Millwall at The Den on 19 November. On 3 March 2001, Jones scored the first hat-trick of his career in the 6–2 league win against Nuneaton Borough. He finished the season with 21 goals in all competitions, these went a long way to firing RMI to a fifth-place finish in the Conference, the club's highest ever league finish. At the Conference Annual General Meeting on 2 June, Jones was named in the Football Conference Team of the Year, as voted for by the league's managers.

Jones attracted interest from a number of clubs in the close season, Morecambe being the first to make a bid for the Northern Irishman in late May. The Shrimps had bids of £30,000 and £45,000 rejected by RMI. Tranmere Rovers were the next club to take an interest in Jones and manager Dave Watson took him on trial at the beginning of July. However, it was Crewe Alexandra who won the race for Jones' signature after manager Dario Gradi persuaded him to sign on 3 July. He signed for Crewe on a three-year contract in a deal worth £75,000 to Leigh, and £75,000 more to come after 60 appearances.

=== Crewe Alexandra ===
Jones made his debut for Crewe in the league game against Manchester City on 25 August 2001. He replaced Rodney Jack in the 82nd minute of the 5–2 defeat at Maine Road. On 27 October, he made his first start for the club in the 1–0 defeat by Sheffield United at Brammall Lane. Despite being a regular goalscorer in the reserves, Jones found first-team opportunities scarce in his first season at Crewe, so it was decided he would join Third Division side Rochdale on a month's loan in February 2002. He returned from his loan in April and featured in two of Crewe's remaining games in the First Division, coming on as a substitute in the away defeats to Gillingham and Wimbledon.

==== Rochdale (loan) ====
Jones made his debut for Rochdale on 5 February 2002, playing the full 90 minutes in the 5–4 win against York City at Spotland Stadium. He scored his first goal for The Dale on 23 February, scoring the opening goal in the 2–1 defeat at Scunthorpe United. On 7 March, Rochdale manager John Hollins confirmed that Jones would stay at the club for at least another month, but the deal would involve a 24-hour recall option for Crewe. He made his final appearance for the club on 26 March in the 3–1 defeat by Plymouth Argyle, he came off the bench in 75th minute replacing Kevin Townson.

Following Crewe's relegation to the Second Division, Jones started to feature in the first-team more prominently at the start of the 2002–03 season. He made his first appearance of the season on 13 August, replacing Dave Brammer in the 60th minute of the 3–0 defeat by Notts County at Gresty Road. Jones scored his first goals for Crewe in the league match against Queens Park Rangers, he netted both goals in the 2–0 win on 5 October. He followed that up by scoring the third goal in the 4–1 win at Stockport County a week later. He scored a brace against Colchester United in January 2003 and another against Northampton Town in February, these went towards the 11 goals in all competitions he scored that helped The Railwaymen to a second-place finish in the Second Division, gaining them promotion back to the First Division.

Prior to the 2003–04 season, Jones signed a new three-year contract with the club that would take him through to the end of the 2005–06 season. He started in Crewe's first game back in the First Division on 9 August, playing the full 90 minutes in the 3–1 defeat against Wimbledon at Selhurst Park. Three days later, he scored his first goal of the season in the 2–0 League Cup first round win against Wrexham. A brace against West Ham United on 17 March 2004 took Jones' tally for the season to 16, this coupled with the 20 goals scored by strike partner Dean Ashton helped Crewe to an 18th-place finish in the league. His efforts throughout the season earned him the Supporters Player of the Year award.

Jones scored on his first start of the 2004–05 season on 24 August, scoring two first half goals in the 4–1 League Cup first round win against Blackpool. Four days later, he helped Crewe to their first league win of the season, scoring two goals in the 4–2 win against Derby County at Pride Park. On 26 October, he started against Manchester United in the League Cup third round, playing 68 minutes of the 3–0 defeat at Gretsy Road. On 8 May 2005, Jones scored the winning goal in the 2–1 league win against Coventry City, the goal gave The Alex their first win in 19 games and saved the club from relegation on the final day of the season.

At the beginning of the 2005–06 season, Jones indicated to Crewe manager Dario Gradi that he wanted to leave at the end of the season when his contract expired. In October, Preston North End manager Billy Davies declared his interest in bringing Jones to Deepdale, however Crewe were not interested in the player part-exchange offer that was being tabled. Queens Park Rangers took an interest in signing Jones in January 2006, however they were unable to meet the club's valuation of £300,000 for him. Despite the uncertainty about his future, Jones was still a regular in the team throughout the season and managed to score 5 goals overall, including a goal in his final appearance against Millwall on 30 April. Crewe were relegated at the end of the season, and despite a very good contract being offered, Jones confirmed his decision to leave. He wanted to stay in the Championship and thought he could make more money elsewhere. Overall Jones made 173 appearances for Crewe and scored 45 goals.

=== Burnley ===
Burnley announced on 3 May 2006 that Jones would join the club on a Bosman signing, with the move being completed on 1 July. He signed a three-year deal with the Championship side. Jones made a scoring start to his Burnley career, netting both goals in the 2–0 win against Queens Park Rangers on the opening day of the season. On 23 September, he opened the scoring in the 3–2 defeat against Southampton at Turf Moor. After a goal drought of over 6 months, he scored in the 4–0 win against Plymouth Argyle on 3 April 2007, and he followed that up with a goal in the 2–0 win against Cardiff City six days later. Jones scored 5 goals in 43 appearances in the 2006–07 season, helping Burnley to a 15th-place finish in the Championship.

Jones' first start of the 2007–08 season was in the League Cup first round game against Grimbsy Town at Blundell Park, he played the full 120 minutes as the game finished 1–1 and Burnley won 4–2 on penalties. On 15 September, he scored his first goal of the season in the 2–2 league draw against Blackpool. After Owen Coyle replaced Steve Cotterill as Burnley manager in November, Jones was used mainly as a substitute, making his solitary league start of the season in the 1–0 win against Plymouth Argyle on 12 January 2008. The following week in the 2–1 win at Coventry City, Jones suffered a medial knee ligament tear that would keep him out of action for six weeks, scuppering a pending loan move to former club Crewe Alexandra. The appearance against Coventry turned out to be his last for The Clarets. On 27 March, it was announced that Jones would join League One side Crewe on loan until the end of the season.

==== Crewe Alexandra (loan) ====
Jones made his re-debut for Crewe on 29 March 2008, playing 85 minutes in the 2–1 defeat by Luton Town at Kenilworth Road. Over the next month, he made two substitute appearances against Cheltenham Town and AFC Bournemouth respectively, before he signed off his second spell at The Railwaymen with a goal in the 4–1 defeat by Oldham Athletic on 3 May.

Despite featuring in pre-season, Jones had become surplus to requirements going into the last year of his contract at Burnley. Having not featured in the first-team at all during the opening weeks of the 2008–09 season, he joined Huddersfield Town on an initial one-month loan deal starting on 17 October. He returned to Turf Moor on 26 November and joined Bradford City on loan the next day, the initial deal running until 3 January 2009 then being extended by an extra month, and finally being extended until the end of the season by The Bantams. On 1 June, Jones was released by Burnley alongside Gábor Király and Alan Mahon.

==== Huddersfield Town (loan) ====
Jones made his debut for League One side Huddersfield on 18 October 2008, playing the full 90 minutes in the 1–1 draw against Bristol Rovers at the Galpharm Stadium. He followed this up by playing the full 90 minutes in the 5–3 defeat at Hartlepool United three days later, and after two subsequent substitute appearances against Yeovil Town and former club Crewe Alexandra, he returned to Burnley on 26 November.

==== Bradford City (loan) ====
Jones made his debut for Bradford in the FA Cup second round tie against Leyton Orient on 29 November 2008, he played the full 90 minutes in the 2–1 defeat at Valley Parade He made his league debut a week later in the 1–1 draw against Dagenham & Redbridge. He scored his first goal for the club on 31 January 2009, netting the second goal in the 2–0 win over Grimsby Town. Two weeks later, he scored the only goal as The Bantams beat Wycombe Wanderers 1–0, keeping the club's promotion hopes alive. On 25 April, Jones made his final appearance for the club, scoring the third goal in the 3–0 win over Rotherham United. Overall, he made 27 appearances for Bradford and scored 3 goals.

=== Walsall ===
Jones signed for Walsall on 10 July 2009, penning a two-year deal with the League One club. He made his debut on 8 August in the 1–0 league win against Brighton & Hove Albion, he started the game before being substituted in the 65th minute for Richard Taundry. A week later on his home debut, he scored his first goal for the club in the 2–2 draw with Southend United when he headed in a Darryl Westlake free-kick to open the scoring in the 11th minute. On 17 October, Jones scored a brace against Exeter City, bagging two first half goals in the 3–0 win at the Bescot Stadium. He scored the opening goal in the 1–1 draw against Swindon Town on 17 April 2010, this took his tally to 10 goals for the season that ultimately helped The Saddlers to a 10th place league finish.

On 7 August, Jones started the opening league game of the 2010–11 season, playing the full 90 minutes in the 2–1 defeat against Milton Keynes Dons. Two weeks later in a match against Plymouth Argyle, Jones suffered an ankle injury that would keep him out for 7 weeks. He made his return in the 1–1 draw with Dagenham & Redbridge on 16 October, replacing Julian Gray in the 69th minute at Victoria Road. Despite regaining his fitness, Jones struggled to regain his place in the first team and he was allowed to join Scottish Premier League side Motherwell on loan until the end of the season in January 2011. On 11 May, Walsall announced on their website that Jones would not be offered a new contract at the club.

==== Motherwell (loan) ====
Jones linked up with Stuart McCall again at Motherwell, The Steelmen manager was in charge at Bradford City during Jones' loan-spell at Valley Parade. He made his debut in the 2–0 league win over Hibernian on 22 January, he started the game and played 63 minutes before being replaced by Jonathan Page. On 30 January, he came off the bench in the 2–1 League Cup semi-final defeat against Rangers at Hampden Park. Jones scored his first goal for the club on 5 February, netting the opening goal in the 2–0 Scottish Cup fifth-round win over Stranraer. He scored the opening goal in the 1–1 draw with Kilmarnock on 11 May. Jones made his final appearance for Motherwell in the Scottish Cup Final on 21 May, he replaced Jamie Murphy in the 80th minute of the 3–0 defeat against Celtic. He was offered a contract at Fir Park following his release from Walsall, but he rejected the deal in favour of being with his family at his home in Crewe.

=== Droylsden ===
Bristol Rovers offered Jones a two-year deal in the summer, but he rejected the chance to join the League Two club because he felt it was too far to travel and he wanted to stay local to his family in Crewe. He was on trial with Conference National side Newport County in July 2011, however he was unable to agree a deal with the Welsh side and he signed for Conference North side Droylsden on 12 August. Jones scored on his debut for The Bloods, netting the opening goal in the 2–2 draw against Eastwood Town on 13 August.

=== AFC Telford United ===
After a short spell with Droylsden, Jones signed for Conference National side AFC Telford United on 18 November 2011. He made his debut the following day in the 0–0 draw against Mansfield Town, he came on for Craig Farrell after 61 minutes and almost scored with his first touch, but his effort was well saved by Mansfield goalkeeper Alan Marriott. On 26 November, he came off the bench in the 1–0 win against Barrow, replacing Sean Newton after 68 minutes and scoring his first goal for the club. He headed in a Richard Davies cross on 76 minutes to give The Bucks their first league win in 9 outings. He made his first start for the club in the 1–1 draw against Luton Town three days later. Jones scored in the 2–2 draw with Stockport County on 24 January 2012. In the 0–0 draw with Alfreton Town on 3 March, Jones suffered a knee ligament injury that would keep him out of action for up to six weeks. He made his return from injury on 17 April, coming on as a 68th-minute substitute in the 1–0 win against Tamworth. The win secured Telford's place in the Conference National for the following season. On 4 May, it was announced on Telford's website that Jones had agreed terms to a contract extension with the club.

Prior to the 2012–13 season, Jones was allocated the number 10 squad number. On 11 August, he played in the opening game of the season, playing the whole 90 minutes in the 0–0 draw with Barrow. He scored his first goal of the season in the 3–0 league win against Southport on 1 September. On 9 October, Jones scored a brace in the 4–1 league win against Dartford. He followed that up by scoring both goals in Telford's 2–2 draw against Ebbsfleet United on 6 November. Jones was sent off on 10 November, he was dismissed for a late tackle on Greg Taylor in the 0–0 draw with Tamworth and was suspended for three games. On 15 December, Jones was sent off again in only his second game back from his suspension and was subsequently banned for a further four games. He was dismissed after being booked twice within a minute in the 3–1 FA Trophy second round defeat against King's Lynn Town, firstly for a dive in the penalty area and then for an off-the-ball barge on Jordan Yong. Jones suffered a serious eye injury in the league match against Mansfield Town on 2 March 2013, he temporarily lost the sight in his left eye after being struck in the face with a heavy clearance during the first half of the 1–0 defeat at Field Mill. It was later confirmed that Jones had suffered three haemorrhages in the eye, one in the iris and two in the retina, as well as severe bruising. His vision later returned after a course of eye drops and he returned to action the following week in the 2–0 league defeat by Macclesfield Town. Jones finished the season with 11 goals as Telford finished 24th in the league and were relegated to the Conference North. On 11 May, Telford announced on their website that they would not be offering Jones terms for the following season.

=== Airbus UK Broughton ===
On 22 May 2013, Jones signed for Welsh Premier League side Airbus UK Broughton. He said the lure of European football was a major factor in agreeing a deal with The Wingmakers. On 4 July, Jones made his debut for Airbus, coming on as a 55th-minute substitute in the Europa League first qualifying round first leg against Latvian side FK Ventspils. The match, played at the Racecourse Ground in Wrexham, ended 1–1. He made his first start for the club in the second leg, having a first half goal disallowed as Airbus drew 0–0 at the Ventspils Olimpiskais Stadions, the result meaning the Welsh club were eliminated on away goals. He scored his first goal for the club on 26 August, netting the winning goal in the 2–1 league win at Bala Town. On 7 September, Jones scored two goals as Airbus thrashed Newtown 6–1 to register their fourth straight victory of the season. A week later, he was sent off for two bookable offences in the 2–2 draw at Rhyl, the first for impeding goalkeeper Alex Ramsey, and the second just a few minutes later for something he said to the referee. On 25 February 2014, Jones scored the third goal in Airbus' 4–2 league win at Bangor City. Overall, he made 27 appearances for the club, the last in the 1–1 draw with Newtown on 26 April, and scored 5 goals, helping The Wingmakers to their most successful league campaign ever.

=== Nantwich Town ===
On 19 May 2014, Jones signed for Northern Premier League Premier Division side Nantwich Town. He made his debut on 16 August, playing 80 minutes in the 1–0 league win at Buxton. Steve, also scored the goal of the season in the Nantwich Town team and also won top goalscorer.

=== Whitchurch Alport ===
Jones signed for North West Counties Football League Premier Division side Whitchurch Alport in the summer of 2019.

=== Alsager Town ===
Jones left Whitchurch in February 2020 to sign for North West Counties Football League Division One South side Alsager Town. He joined the club to be closer to his home in south Cheshire.

=== Sandbach United ===
Jones signed for North West Counties Football League First Division South side Sandbach United in the summer of 2020.

He joined Malpas FC (Cheshire Football League) as a player coach in 2023 and is currently manager at the Oxhays.

== International career ==
=== England Semi-Pro ===
Jones was called up to the England C national side in March 2001 after showing good form for Leigh RMI in the Conference. England manager John Owens selected Jones after Rushden & Diamonds winger Paul Underwood had to withdraw from the squad through injury. On 22 March, Jones started the 3–0 win against the Netherlands, however he had to come off after just 18-minutes after failing to fully recover from a bout of food poisoning. He earned a second cap in May 2001 when he scored in the 3–0 win against a Highland League Select in Inverness.

=== Northern Ireland ===
Jones has won a total of 29 caps for Northern Ireland. He was first called up for the friendly match against Finland in February 2003, he replaced the injured Kevin Horlock in the squad before being an unused substitute in the 1–0 defeat on 14 February. In May 2003, he got his first taste of international football when he was called up for the B international match against Scotland Future. He started the game against Scotland and managed to get on the scoresheet in the 2–1 defeat on 20 May.

After impressing in the B international match against Scotland, Jones was called up to the senior squad on 23 May for the friendly against Italy and the Euro 2004 qualifying match against Spain. He made his debut in the 2–0 defeat against Italy on 3 June, he replaced Paul McVeigh on the 55th minute and almost scored in the 76th minute, but his firm header was well saved by Francesco Toldo. On 11 June, Jones made his first start for his country against Spain at Windsor Park, he played 73 minutes on the way to helping Northern Ireland to a 0–0 draw.

Jones was a regular in the squad over the next three years, often being used as a substitute. He scored his first goal for his country in a 2–0 friendly win against Saint Kitts and Nevis on 2 June 2004. He played in most of Northern Ireland's unsuccessful 2006 World Cup qualifying campaign and the early stages of their Euro 2008 qualifying campaign before falling out of favour within the selection process. His last cap was a substitute appearance in the 2–1 away defeat against Iceland during Euro 2008 qualifying.

==== International goals ====
===== England C team =====
Updated to games played 16 May 2001.

#	Date	Venue	Opponent	Score	Result	Competition
1.	16 May 2001	Inverness, Scotland	Highland League Select	3–0	Win	Friendly

===== Northern Ireland B team =====
Updated to games played 20 May 2003.

#	Date	Venue	Opponent	Score	Result	Competition
1.	20 May 2003	Firhill Stadium, Glasgow, Scotland	Scotland	2–1	Loss	Friendly

===== Northern Ireland Senior team =====
Updated to games played 12 September 2007.

#	Date	Venue	Opponent	Score	Result	Competition
1.	4 June 2004	Warner Park, Basseterre, Saint Kitts and Nevis	Saint Kitts and Nevis	2–0	Win	Friendly

== Career statistics ==
=== Club ===
As of 7 October 2014.

Appearances and goals by club, season and competition
Club	Season	League			FA Cup		League Cup		FL Trophy		Europe		Total	
Club	Season	Division	Apps	Goals	Apps	Goals	Apps	Goals	Apps	Goals	Apps	Goals	Apps	Goals
Chadderton	1994–95	North West Counties Division One	0	0	0	0	0	0	0	0	0	0	0	0
Blackpool	1995–96	Second Division	0	0	0	0	0	0	0	0	0	0	0	0
Bury	1996–97	Second Division	0	0	0	0	0	0	0	0	0	0	0	0
Sligo Rovers	1997–98	League of Ireland Premier Division	46	6	0	0	0	0	0	0	0	0	46	6
Sligo Rovers	1998–99	League of Ireland Premier Division	46	6	0	0	0	0	0	0	0	0	46	6
Bray Wanderers	1998–99	League of Ireland Premier Division	3	0	0	0	0	0	0	0	0	0	3	0
Chorley	1998–99	Northern Premier League	4	0	0	0	0	0	0	0	0	0	4	0
Leigh RMI	1999–2000	Northern Premier League	40	18	0	0	0	0	0	0	0	0	40	18
Leigh RMI	2000–01	Conference	42	19	2	1	1	1	0	0	0	0	45	21
Leigh RMI	Total		82	37	2	1	1	1	0	0	0	0	85	39
Crewe Alexandra	2001–02	First Division	6	0	0	0	0	0	0	0	0	0	6	0
Crewe Alexandra	2002–03	Second Division	30	9	3	1	1	0	4	1	0	0	38	11
Crewe Alexandra	2003–04	First Division	45	15	1	0	1	1	0	0	0	0	47	16
Crewe Alexandra	2004–05	Championship	36	10	1	0	3	3	0	0	0	0	40	13
Crewe Alexandra	2005–06	Championship	41	5	0	0	1	0	0	0	0	0	42	5
Crewe Alexandra	Total		158	39	5	1	6	4	4	1	0	0	173	45
Rochdale (loan)	2001–02	Third Division	9	1	0	0	0	0	0	0	0	0	9	1
Burnley	2006–07	Championship	41	5	1	0	1	0	0	0	0	0	43	5
Burnley	2007–08	Championship	17	1	1	0	3	0	0	0	0	0	21	1
Burnley	2008–09	Championship	0	0	0	0	0	0	0	0	0	0	0	0
Burnley	Total		58	6	2	0	4	0	0	0	0	0	64	6
Crewe Alexandra (loan)	2007–08	League One	4	1	0	0	0	0	0	0	0	0	4	1
Huddersfield Town (loan)	2008–09	League One	4	0	0	0	0	0	0	0	0	0	4	0
Bradford City (loan)	2008–09	League Two	26	3	1	0	0	0	0	0	0	0	27	3
Walsall	2009–10	League One	30	9	2	1	1	0	1	0	0	0	34	10
Walsall	2010–11	League One	13	0	2	0	1	0	0	0	0	0	16	0
Walsall	Total		43	9	4	1	2	0	1	0	0	0	50	10
Motherwell (loan)	2010–11	Scottish Premier League	12	1	4	1	1	0	0	0	0	0	17	2
Droylsden	2011–12	Conference North	1	1	0	0	0	0	0	0	0	0	1	1
AFC Telford United	2011–12	Conference National	15	3	0	0	0	0	0	0	0	0	15	3
AFC Telford United	2012–13	Conference National	30	10	2	1	1	0	0	0	0	0	33	11
AFC Telford United	Total		45	13	2	1	1	0	0	0	0	0	48	14
Airbus UK Broughton	2013–14	Welsh Premier League	22	5	2	0	1	0	0	0	2	0	27	5
Nantwich Town	2014–15	Northern Premier League Premier Division	6	0	0	0	0	0	0	0	0	0	6	0
Career total			523	122	22	5	16	5	5	1	2	0	568	133

=== International ===
As of 12 September 2007.

National team	Year	Apps	Goals
England C	2001	2	1
Total		2	1
Northern Ireland B	2003	1	1
Total		1	1
Northern Ireland	2003	5	0
Northern Ireland	2004	8	1
Northern Ireland	2005	8	0
Northern Ireland	2006	5	0
Northern Ireland	2007	3	0
Total		29	1

== Honours ==
=== Club ===
Sligo Rovers

- League of Ireland Cup (1): 1997–98

Leigh RMI

- Northern Premier League Premier Division (1): 1999–2000
- Peter Swales Challenge Shield (1): 1999–2000

Crewe Alexandra

- Football League Second Division runner-up (1): 2002–03

Motherwell

- Scottish Cup runner-up (1): 2010–11

Airbus UK Broughton

- Welsh Premier League runner-up (1): 2013–14

=== Individual ===
- Leigh RMI Players' Player of the Year (1): 1999–2000
- Leigh RMI Supporters' Player of the Year (2): 1999–2000, 2000–01
- Leigh RMI Young Player of the Year (1): 1999–2000
- Football Conference Goalscorer of the Month (1): March 2001
- Football Conference Team of the Year (1): 2000–01
- Crewe Alexandra Supporters' Player of the Year (1): 2003–04

==Personal life= team.
