= Sean McClare =

English footballer

Personal information
- Full name: Sean Patrick McClare
- Date of birth: 12 January 1978 (age 48)
- Place of birth: Rotherham, England
- Height: 5 ft 11 in (1.80 m)
- Position: Midfielder

Youth career
- Barnsley

Senior career*
Years	Team	Apps	(Gls)
1993–2001	Barnsley	50	(6)
2000	→ Rochdale (loan)	9	(0)
2001	→ Port Vale (loan)	7	(0)
2001–2003	Port Vale	33	(1)
2003–2004	Rochdale	38	(0)
2005	Halifax Town	1	(0)
2005	Bradford Park Avenue		
2005–2006	Scarborough	15	(0)
2006–2007	Grantham Town		
Total		153+	(7+)
- * Club domestic league appearances and goals

Sean Patrick McClare (born 12 January 1978) is an English former footballer. He played for Barnsley between 1993 and 2001 before moving on to Port Vale following a short loan spell. In the summer of 2003, he moved on to Rochdale before being released the following year. He later turned out for non-League sides Halifax Town, Bradford Park Avenue, Scarborough, and Grantham Town.

== Career ==
McClare began his career with Barnsley, making 69 first-team appearances in all competitions between 1993 and 2001. He found most of his first-team action under John Hendrie's stewardship in the 1998–99 First Division campaign, playing 40 games and scoring four goals. He played nine games for Rochdale during a loan spell in April 2000, before he joined Port Vale on loan in November 2001. After his loan spell with Vale finished he was signed by Brian Horton permanently on a free transfer, scoring his first goal for the club against Oldham Athletic. He made 25 appearances for the "Valiants" in 2001–02, before playing 20 games in 2002–03. He left Vale Park after he was released in May 2003.

In July 2003, he signed a permanent contract with Rochdale. He played 41 games for the "Dale"; however, he was released in May 2004 after what was a poor season for the club, as they finished two places above the Third Division relegation zone. In February 2005 he moved on to Halifax Town, but the next month he signed with Bradford Park Avenue, where he saw out the rest of the season.

In November 2005, McClare signed for former Oakwell teammate Neil Redfearn's Scarborough, making around 15 appearances, but the "Seadogs" were relegated from the Conference at the end of the 2005–06 season. He was released alongside most of the squad.

McClare returned to the part-time game in the autumn of 2006, signing for Unibond Premier Division side Grantham Town. After only twenty-five appearances, and despite being one of the "Gingerbreads" most experienced and impressive players, financial constraints resulted in his release by Town in January 2007.

== Career statistics ==
Appearances and goals by club, season and competition
Club	Season	League			FA Cup		Other		Total	
Club	Season	Division	Apps	Goals	Apps	Goals	Apps	Goals	Apps	Goals
Barnsley	1998–99	First Division	30	3	5	1	5	0	40	4
Barnsley	1999–2000	First Division	10	2	0	0	5	0	15	2
Barnsley	2000–01	First Division	10	1	1	0	3	0	14	1
Barnsley	Total		50	6	6	1	13	0	69	7
Rochdale (loan)	1999–2000	Third Division	9	0	0	0	0	0	9	0
Port Vale	2001–02	Second Division	23	1	1	0	2	0	26	1
Port Vale	2002–03	Second Division	17	0	1	0	3	0	21	0
Port Vale	Total		40	1	2	0	5	0	47	1
Rochdale	2003–04	Third Division	38	0	1	0	2	0	41	0
