= Michael Simpkins =

English footballer (born 1978)

Personal information
- Full name: Michael James Simpkins
- Date of birth: 28 November 1978 (age 47)
- Place of birth: Sheffield, South Yorkshire, England
- Height: 6 ft 0 in (1.83 m)
- Position: Left back

Team information
- Current team: Belper Town

Senior career*
Years	Team	Apps	(Gls)
1997–1998	Sheffield Wednesday	0	(0)
1998–2001	Chesterfield	26	(0)
2001–2002	Cardiff City	17	(0)
2002	→ Exeter City (loan)	5	(0)
2003	→ Cheltenham Town (loan)	2	(0)
2003–2004	Rochdale	27	(0)
2004–2005	Burton Albion	20	(1)
2005	→ Alfreton Town (loan)	?	(?)
2005	Leigh RMI	8	(0)
2005–2007	Worksop Town	45	(0)
2006	Buxton	?	(?)
2006	Grantham Town	8	(0)
2007–20??	Retford United	?	(?)
20??–2011	Worksop Town		
2011	Frickley Athletic		
2011–	Belper Town		
- * Club domestic league appearances and goals as of 22:11, 16 August 2009 (UTC)

Michael James Simpkins (born 28 November 1978) is an English former footballer who played for Belper Town. A defender by trade, Simpkins was primarily a left back but now plays in the more familiar role of central defender.

== Career ==
He began his professional career at Chesterfield after progressing through the youth team. In 2001, he moved on to Cardiff City but failed to make a significant impact on the first team at Ninian Park and had loan spells at Exeter City and Cheltenham Town.

He moved on to Rochdale in 2003 on a two-year contract. He was the regular left back for manager Alan Buckley. However, he was quickly dropped by new manager Steve Parkin and persuaded to leave in the summer of 2004. He dropped into non-League football, signing for Conference National side Burton Albion, making 20 appearances in the 2004–05 season, before moving to league rivals Leigh RMI in March 2005, but he could not prevent Leigh's relegation at the end of the season.

Simpkins then moved closer to his native Sheffield by linking up with Worksop Town ahead of the 2005–06 season, and spent just over a year with the Tigers, establishing himself as a first-team regular; however, due to his poor disciplinary record, he was released early in the 2006–07 season after a sending-off against Vauxhall Motors. Simpkins then signed for Buxton, but left the club after a change of heart very soon afterwards and instead joined Grantham Town. He was named captain of the Gingerbreads and his impressive form for the Lincolnshire side earned a transfer bid from Conference North outfit Worcester City, but he declined the offer due to travelling concerns.

Budget cuts at Grantham forced Simpkins' departure in January 2008. He later signed for Retford United. Simpkins stayed with Retford in their successful title-winning side of 2007–08 and has agreed to stay with the club for the 2008–09 season.

He subsequently moved to Worksop Town where he became club captain

In the summer of 2011 he moved to Frickley Athletic before joining Belper Town in October 2011.
