= Scott Shields Emerson =

American biostatistician

- Citizenship: American
- Education: University of Virginia and University of Washington
- Occupation: Professor of biostatistics
- Title: Emeritus professor of the University of Washington

Scott Shields Emerson is an American biostatistician and emeritus professor of the University of Washington.

Emerson was a professor of biostatistics at the University of Washington in the School of Public Health's department of biostatistics from 1999 to 2017. Emerson worked on randomized controlled trial design. Emerson has been part of advisory committees for the Food and Drug Administration, including on work related to Aduhelm.

== Schooling ==
Emerson studied at the University of Virginia and the University of Washington.
