= Matthew Hockley =

English footballer

Personal information
- Date of birth: 5 June 1982 (age 44)
- Place of birth: Paignton, Devon, England
- Position: Midfielder

Team information
- Current team: Bideford

Youth career
- 1998–2000: Torquay United

Senior career*
Years	Team	Apps	(Gls)
2000–2008	Torquay United	239	(10)
2008–2009	Truro City	19	(3)
2009–2014	Bideford	?	(?)
2014–2015	Dereham Town	?	(?)
2015 –	Bideford	?	(?)
- * Club domestic league appearances and goals as of 11 February 2009

Matthew Hockley (born 5 June 1982) is an English former professional footballer, who plays for Bideford. He can play in defence or midfield.

Hockley was born in Paignton, Devon and joined Torquay United as a trainee. He turned professional in July 2000 and made his first-team debut in the 1–1 draw at home to Southend United in the FA Cup 1st Round on 18 November 2000. His league debut came the following week in a 2–1 home win against Barnet. He made sporadic appearances over the next two seasons before becoming a regular under Leroy Rosenior, missing only one game in the 2003-04 promotion season. He is nicknamed 'Pitbull' due to his tenacious tackling.

In May 2005, he accepted a new contract with Torquay and in the 2006–07 season made his 200th first team appearance for the Gulls. His 200th league appearance came on 2 March 2007 in a 1–1 draw away to Chester City, Hockley replacing Lloyd Kerry as a late substitute.

Torquay were relegated to the Conference National at the end of the 2006–07 season, but Hockley chose to remain with the club, agreeing a new contract with new Torquay manager Paul Buckle. He was an unused substitute in Torquay's FA Trophy Final defeat at Wembley in May 2008, and was released by Torquay three days later.

Hockley joined Truro City in June 2008. After 1 season at Truro City he then moved onto Bideford on a free transfer.

His brother Wayne was also a professional with Torquay United.

== All time playing career ==
Season	Team	Division	League Apps	League Goals	Cup Apps	Cup Goals
2000–01	Torquay United	3	6	1	2	0
2001–02	Torquay United	3	12	0	1	0
2002–03	Torquay United	3	40	2	1	0
2003–04	Torquay United	3	45	5	2	0
2004–05	Torquay United	2	35	1	2	0
2005–06	Torquay United	2	36	5	0	0
2006–07	Torquay United	2	37	0	4	0
2007-08	Torquay United	Conference National	29	1	4	0
