= Paul Wheatcroft =

English footballer

Personal information
- Date of birth: 22 November 1980 (age 45)
- Place of birth: Manchester, England
- Position: Forward

Youth career
- ?–1999: Manchester United

Senior career*
Years	Team	Apps	(Gls)
1999–2000	Manchester United	0	(0)
1999–2000	→ FC Fortune (loan)		
2000–2002	Bolton Wanderers	3	(0)
2001	→ Rochdale (loan)	6	(3)
2002	→ Mansfield Town (loan)	2	(0)
2002–2003	Scunthorpe United	4	(0)
2003	Southport	7	(1)
2003	Oldham Athletic	0	(0)
2003–2004	Stalybridge Celtic		
2004	Radcliffe Borough	4	(0)
2004	→ Rossendale United (loan)		
- * Club domestic league appearances and goals

Paul Wheatcroft (born 22 November 1980) is an English former footballer who played as a forward. He started his career as a youth at Manchester United before joining Bolton Wanderers in 2000, being loaned out to Rochdale and Mansfield Town. In 2002, he then joined Scunthorpe United before dropping into non-League football with Southport, Stalybridge Celtic and Radcliffe Borough, where he was loaned to with Rossendale United.

== Career ==
Wheatcroft started his career as a trainee at Manchester United, having attended The FA's National School of Excellence in Lilleshall. After a loan spell at South African club FC Fortune, Wheatcroft was released from Manchester United and subsequently signed for Bolton Wanderers. Whilst at Bolton, he had loan spells with Rochdale and Mansfield Town.

He went on to join Scunthorpe United in the summer of 2002, before being released and joining Conference National club Southport in January 2003. Southport manager Phil Wilson stated that; "Paul has a good pedigree, having played for Manchester United and Bolton and we are hoping he can kick-start his career."

Wheatcroft then had a spell at Oldham Athletic, having been offered non-contract terms, but was released due to the club's poor financial situation. He went on to join Stalybridge Celtic in September 2003.

In January 2004, Wheatcroft then joined Northern Premier League Premier Division club Radcliffe Borough alongside defender, Terry Bowker. On signing for Radcliffe, his manager Kevin Glendon said; "Paul has an excellent pedigree and at still only 23 has crammed a lot of football experience into such a short space of time." In March 2004, he was loaned out to Northern Premier League First Division club Rossendale United.
