= Chris Hughes (footballer) =

English footballer

Personal information
- Full name: Christopher Hughes
- Date of birth: 5 March 1984 (age 42)
- Place of birth: Hetton-le-Hole, Sunderland, England
- Position: Midfielder

Youth career
- ????–2003: Darlington

Senior career*
Years	Team	Apps	(Gls)
2003–2005	Darlington	45	(2)
2005–2006	Scarborough	23	(2)
2006–2008	Gateshead	55	(7)
- * Club domestic league appearances and goals as of 15:10, 25 July 2008 (UTC)

Christopher Hughes (born 5 March 1984) is an English former professional football midfielder.

Hughes previously played for Darlington and Scarborough. He played 45 league games, scoring 2 times in 2 years for Darlington between 2003 and 2005. He also played for Scarborough, playing 23 league games and scoring 2 times for a year between 2005 and 2006. Hughes joined Gateshead in 2006, having previously been at Scarborough. Having sustained a bad injury during the 2007–08 season, Hughes was released by Gateshead in May 2008. Chris Hughes now manager Shildon AFC in the Ebac Northern League Division 1.

== Honours ==
Gateshead

- Northern Premier League Premier Division playoff winner: 2007–08
- Durham Challenge Cup runner-up: 2007–08
