= Phil Hadland =

English footballer and manager

Personal information
- Full name: Philip Jonathan Hadland
- Date of birth: 20 October 1980 (age 46)
- Place of birth: Warrington, England
- Position: Winger

Youth career
- Reading

Senior career*
Years	Team	Apps	(Gls)
1997–2000	Reading	1	(0)
2000–2001	Rochdale	32	(2)
2001–2002	Leyton Orient	5	(1)
2002	Carlisle United (loan)	4	(1)
2002	Brighton & Hove Albion	2	(0)
2002–2003	Darlington	6	(0)
2003–2004	Colchester United	1	(0)
2005–2006	Leek Town	55	(15)
2006–2007	Hednesford Town		
2007–2008	Kidsgrove Athletic		

Managerial career
- 2016: Colwyn Bay (assistant)
- 2016–2017: Colwyn Bay
- * Club domestic league appearances and goals

Philip Jonathan Hadland (born 20 October 1980) is an English retired professional footballer who played as a winger and current manager, who was last in charge of Colwyn Bay. He played for a variety of Football League clubs including Reading, where he began his career and made his debut at the age of 17 against Barnsley at the Madejski Stadium in the League Cup. He then joined Rochdale, where he made 32 appearances (his highest total for a league club), Leyton Orient, Carlisle, Brighton, Darlington and Colchester.
