= David Bayliss =

English footballer

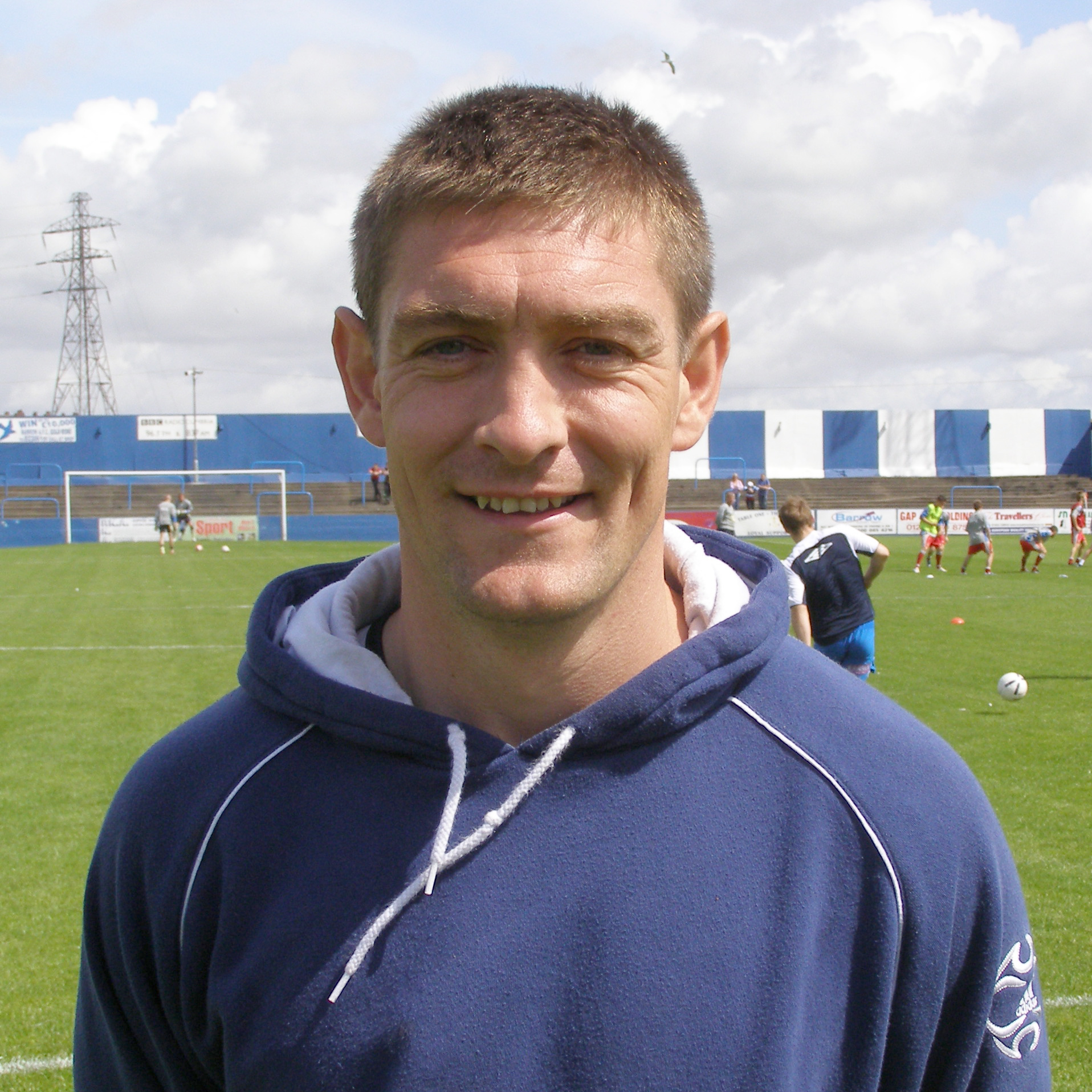
- Bayliss in 2007

Personal information
- Full name: David Anthony Bayliss
- Date of birth: 8 June 1976 (age 50)
- Place of birth: Liverpool, England
- Height: 5 ft 11 in (1.80 m)
- Position: Defender

Youth career
- ?–1995: Rochdale

Senior career*
Years	Team	Apps	(Gls)
1995–2001	Rochdale	185	(9)
2001–2005	Luton Town	37	(0)
2004–2005	→ Chester City (loan)	9	(0)
2005–2006	Wrexham	22	(0)
2006	→ Rochdale (loan)	4	(0)
2006	Lancaster City		
2007–2011	Barrow	38	(1)
Total		295	(10)

Managerial career
- 2007–2013: Barrow
- * Club domestic league appearances and goals

David Anthony Bayliss (born 8 June 1976) is an English football scout. He previously played in defence, and was manager at Barrow.

== Career ==
Born in Liverpool, Merseyside, Bayliss joined Rochdale and progressed through the ranks, making his Football League debut in the 1994–95 season.

He went on to make 186 league appearances for them, scoring nine times, before joining Luton Town during 2001–02.

He spent four seasons at Kenilworth Road, making 37 league appearances and also had nine games on loan to Chester City before being released in the summer of 2005.

He spent the next season with Wrexham making 22 league appearances and he also had a four-game loan spell back at Rochdale.

In the summer of 2006, he joined Lancaster City but then left at the start of November to join Barrow. He later become joint-manager of Barrow. Along with Darren Sheridan he oversaw a major turnaround in Barrow's season. The Bluebirds were 19th in the Conference North when Bayliss and Sheridan took over before an excellent second half to the season saw them finish 5th and qualify for the end of season play-offs. A 4–0 aggregate win over Telford United in the semi-finals was followed by a 1–0 win against Stalybridge Celtic in the final at Burton Albion's Pirelli Stadium and thus a place in the Conference National for the 2008–09 season. Bayliss and Sheridan successfully kept Barrow in the Conference National the following season, finishing twentieth.

With Sheridan he led Barrow to Wembley and the 2010 FA Trophy final where they played Conference National champions Stevenage Borough, who they defeated 2–1 after extra time to lift the trophy. Bayliss remained registered as a player until the end of the 2010–2011 season, though his appearances were largely restricted to low-profile cup matches or filling up the substitutes bench. Following allegations made against him, Darren Sheridan was first suspended and then left Barrow in February 2012, leaving Bayliss as the sole manager of the club. Barrow were relegated under Bayliss at the end of the 2012–13 season and, following an unsuccessful start to the new season in the Conference North, Bayliss left the club in November 2013.

As of May 2020, Bayliss was working as a scout for Millwall, alongside a part-time job with the NHS in ex-offender rehabilitation. He indicated that despite receiving offers, he has no desire to get back into coaching or managing due to the stress of the job.

== Honours ==
Barrow

- Conference North play-offs: 2007–08
- FA Trophy: 2009–10
