= Michael Oliver (footballer, born 1975) =

English footballer

Personal information
- Full name: Michael Oliver
- Date of birth: 2 August 1975 (age 51)
- Place of birth: Middlesbrough, England
- Height: 5 ft 10 in (1.78 m)
- Position: Midfielder

Youth career
- Middlesbrough

Senior career*
Years	Team	Apps	(Gls)
1992–1994	Middlesbrough	0	(0)
1994–1996	Stockport County	22	(1)
1996–2000	Darlington	151	(14)
2000–2003	Rochdale	103	(9)
2003–2004	Barrow		
2004–2005	Spennymoor United		
2005	Thornaby		
2005	Bishop Auckland		
2005–2006	Newcastle Blue Star		
2006	Gateshead	8	(0)
2006–20??	Durham City		
- * Club domestic league appearances and goals

Michael Oliver (born 2 August 1975) is an English former footballer who made 276 appearances in the Football League playing as a midfielder for Stockport County, Darlington and Rochdale in the 1990s and 2000s.

== Life and career ==
Oliver was born in Middlesbrough, and began his career in the youth system of Middlesbrough F.C. He turned professional with the club, but his only first-team appearance came on 16 November 1993, as a substitute in the Anglo-Italian Cup against Ancona. In 1994, he signed for Stockport County; the fee was determined by tribunal. He made his Stockport and Football League debut on 28 February 1995, at the age of 19, as a substitute in a 4–0 defeat at Oxford United in the Second Division, and played in 12 of the remaining 14 matches in the 1994–95 season. He was used infrequently in his second season, was released at its end, and dropped down two divisions to sign for Darlington.

He settled well at Darlington, where he spent four years, and played at least 40 matches in each season in all competitions. His last game for the club was in the 2000 Third Division play-off final defeat to Peterborough United. When his contract expired, he left the club and signed for another Third Division club, Rochdale. He played regularly for two seasons, but his 2002–03 season was disrupted by injury and by disciplinary issues, and he was released at its end.

After leaving Rochdale, Oliver moved into non-league football with Barrow of the Northern Premier League, and went on to play for clubs including Spennymoor United, Thornaby, Bishop Auckland, Newcastle Blue Star, Gateshead, and Durham City.
