= Scott Emmerson =

English footballer

Personal information
- Full name: Scott Emmerson
- Date of birth: 10 October 1982 (age 44)
- Place of birth: Durham, County Durham, England
- Height: 5 ft 9 in (1.75 m)
- Position: Striker

Youth career
- –2000: York City

Senior career*
Years	Team	Apps	(Gls)
2000–2002	York City	14	(1)
- Blyth Spartans
Total		14	(1)
- * Club domestic league appearances and goals

Scott Emmerson (born 10 October 1982) is an English former professional footballer who played as a striker in the Football League for York City, and in non-League football for Blyth Spartans.
