= Matt Doughty =

English footballer (born 1981)

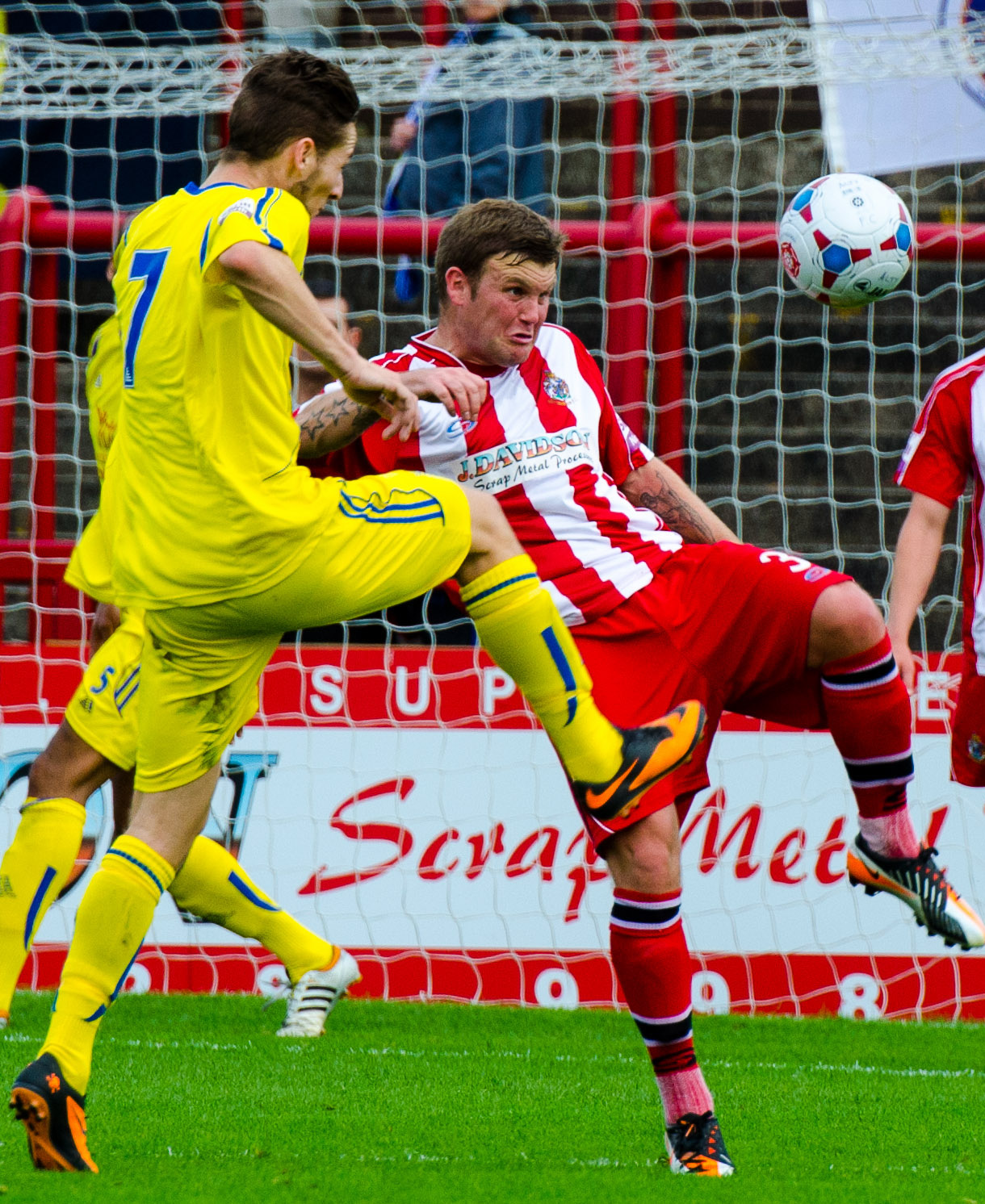
- Doughty in 2013

Personal information
- Full name: Matthew Liam Doughty
- Date of birth: 2 November 1981 (age 45)
- Place of birth: Warrington, Cheshire, England
- Height: 5 ft 8 in (1.73 m)
- Position: Midfielder

Youth career
- Chester City

Senior career*
| Years | Team | Apps | (Gls) |
| 1999–2001 | Chester City | 70 | (2) |
| 2001–2004 | Rochdale | 108 | (1) |
| 2004 | Accrington Stanley | 0 | (0) |
| 2004–2008 | Halifax Town | 131 | (1) |
| 2008–2010 | Altrincham | 67 | (5) |
| 2010–2011 | Witton Albion | ? | (?) |
| 2011–2012 | Hyde | 4 | (0) |
| 2012–2014 | Altrincham | 44 | (2) |
| 2014–2015 | Warrington Town | ? | (?) |
| 2015 | Trafford | 15 | (0) |

Managerial career
- 2016–2017: Altrincham (interim)
- * Club domestic league appearances and goals

Matthew Liam Doughty (born 2 November 1981) is an English former professional football player and manager.

He started his professional career at Chester City, but whilst at the club he was sent to prison for four months following an incident outside a nightclub in Warrington, this meant he missed Chester City's last game in the Football League before they were relegated. In 2001, he joined Rochdale where he spent three seasons before moving on to play for Halifax Town and Altrincham respectively. In 2010, he moved to Witton Albion before joining Hyde in March 2011. He later returned to Altrincham, before playing for Warrington Town and Trafford.

Following his retirement from football, he had a brief spell as manager of Altrincham.

In July 2023, Doughty appeared as one of the contestants on Gordon Ramsay's Hells Kitchen.

== Career ==
=== Chester City ===
Born in Warrington, Doughty signed professional terms with Chester City at the age of 16. He played regularly in 1999–2000 and 2000–01. This period saw him and the club relegated from the Football League, with Doughty missing the decisive final game of the 1999–2000 season after being sent to prison for four months the day before, following an incident outside a nightclub in his home town of Warrington. After his release from prison, he regained his place in the Chester side throughout the 2000–01 season.

=== Rochdale ===
Doughty attracted the interest of many Football League clubs but he joined Rochdale in July 2001. Doughty established himself as the club's first choice left-back. He was offered a trial with Southampton, but a broken leg prevented the move going through. Doughty's first game for Rochdale in August 2001 saw him score in a 2–1 win at Oxford United, the first Football League goal to be scored at the Kassam Stadium. Doughty was not offered a contract renewal from Rochdale in the summer of 2004 and was left without a club.

=== Return to non-league ===
Despite interest from clubs, most notably Bristol Rovers, Doughty said he did not want to "up sticks" and move his young family a long way from home. During the off-season, Accrington Stanley offered Doughty a contract and announced in the press that Doughty had signed, which he had not. Two days after the false announcement he had signed for Accrington, Doughty agreed terms with Halifax Town. In 2008, after the relegation of Halifax Town, he joined Conference National side Altrincham. In 2010, he left Altrincham to join Witton Albion, after sustaining a major injury in a match against Salisbury City.

=== Hyde ===
On 25 March 2011, Doughty left Witton Albion to join Hyde, making his debut the day after in a 0–0 draw against Alfreton Town.

=== Retirement and return to Altrincham ===
Still struggling with injury problems, Doughty fell out of football after his release from Hyde. After a year, he returned to former club Altrincham on trial. He eventually signed up for the season, and made his return to action as a substitute in a 4–1 defeat against Brackley Town. He later played for Warrington Town and Trafford. He returned to Altrincham again when appointed Assistant Manager in 2016. After manager Jim Harvey was sacked in December 2016 he was appointed interim manager. In April 2017 the club announced he was to be replaced by Phil Parkinson.

== Honours ==
Chester City

- Conference League Cup: 2000–01
