= Neil Edwards (footballer, born 1970) =

Welsh footballer

Personal information
- Full name: Neil Ryan Edwards
- Date of birth: 5 December 1970 (age 55)
- Place of birth: Aberdare, Wales
- Position: Goalkeeper

Team information
- Current team: Liverpool (U-18 goalkeeping coach)

Senior career*
Years	Team	Apps	(Gls)
1988–1991	Leeds United	0	(0)
1990	→ Huddersfield Town (loan)	0	(0)
1991–1997	Stockport County	164	(0)
1997–2005	Rochdale	239	(0)
2005–2006	Bury	24	(0)
Total		427	(0)

International career
	Wales U21	1	(0)
- * Club domestic league appearances and goals

Neil Ryan Edwards (born 5 December 1970) is a Welsh former footballer who played as a goalkeeper, before retiring in 2006. He also played for Wales's under 21s. After his retirement, he has coached at Carlisle United, Bolton Wanderers and Liverpool F.C..

== Playing career ==
Edwards started his career as a reserve goalkeeper at Leeds United, playing one first team match, a Full Members' Cup game against Barnsley. He also went on loan to Huddersfield Town, but failed to play a first team match.

On 3 September 1991 Edwards joined Stockport County for £5,000, where he played over 200 games for the Cheshire club, but first team opportunities were restricted due to the team's elevated position in 1996–97.

On 3 November 1997 Edwards joined Rochdale, where he found himself a fans' favourite, and played his part in one of the best defensive records in Division 3. In the pre-season of the 2001–02 season, Edwards was named the captain of Rochdale, but injury made him miss the majority of the season due to injury. In the latter seasons, injuries and the impressive performances of Matthew Gilks forced Edwards out of the first team picture at Spotland. In total, he played 279 League and Cup games at Rochdale.

Edwards then had two contracts offered to him, by Rochdale and Bury, and on 2 July 2005, he joined Bury on a one-year contract, with the guarantee of first-team football as well as a slightly higher wage. He played 24 League games for the Mancunian Gigg Lane club, before an injury ended his season, and he decided to retire at the end of season.

== Coaching career ==
In summer 2006 Edwards joined new Carlisle United manager Neil McDonald's backroom team as goalkeeping coach, but left to Bolton Wanderers to become their assistant goalkeeping coach to Fred Barber.

In August 2009 he appeared in a Bolton Legends game for long serving goalkeeper Jussi Jääskeläinen in what was a warm up event prior to the main game against Hibernian.

He joined Liverpool as U-18 goalkeeping coach ahead of the 2011–12 season.

== Honours ==
Stockport County

- Associate Members' Cup / Football League Trophy runner-up: 1991–92, 1992–93

== Sources ==
- Rollin, Glenda; Rollin, Jack. "English League Players Directory". Sky Sportsfootball yearbook 2006–2007 (37th ed.). Headline Publishing Group. p. 451. ISBN 0-7553-1526-X.
- Neil Edwards' at Soccerbase
- Leeds United fans profile
- football.co.uk profile
