= Wayne Evans (Welsh footballer) =

Welsh footballer (1971–2023)

Personal information
- Full name: Wayne Duncan Evans
- Date of birth: 25 August 1971
- Place of birth: Abermule, Wales
- Date of death: July 2023 (aged 51)
- Place of death: United States
- Position: Defender

Senior career*
Years	Team	Apps	(Gls)
1992–1993	Welshpool Town		
1993–1999	Walsall	183	(1)
1999–2005	Rochdale	259	(3)
2005–2006	Kidderminster Harriers	13	(0)
2007	Welshpool Town	8	(0)
2011	Newtown	0	(0)
Total		463	(4)
- * Club domestic league appearances and goals

Wayne Duncan Evans (25 August 1971 – July 2023) was a Welsh professional footballer who played as a defender for Walsall and Rochdale in the Football League. He later went on to coach youth players, one club being Penn Fusion Soccer Academy in West Chester, Pennsylvania, United States. He stayed for one season, later moving to Nova Scotia, Canada to continue his coaching career.

At Rochdale, Evans was known to fans by the nickname "Evo"; others called him "Wanners". He later played for Kidderminster Harriers and Welshpool Town.

Evans worked as Youth Team manager at Shrewsbury Town alongside former Salop defenders Peter Wilding and David Hughes.

In 2011, he briefly came out of retirement and was named in Newtown squad for the New Year's Day match against Welsh Premier League champions The New Saints.

Evans died at his American home, on the first weekend of July 2023, at the age of 51.

== Honours ==
Walsall

- Football League Third Division runner-up: 1994–95
