= Kevin Townson =

English footballer

Personal information
- Date of birth: 19 April 1983 (age 43)
- Place of birth: Liverpool, England
- Position: Forward

Team information
- Current team: Warrington Town

Youth career
- Everton F.C.

Senior career*
| Years | Team | Apps | (Gls) |
| 2000–2005 | Rochdale | 102 | (25) |
| 2004 | → Scarborough (loan) | 5 | (0) |
| 2005 | → Macclesfield Town (loan) | 6 | (0) |
| 2005–2006 | Macclesfield Town | 24 | (2) |
| 2006–2007 | Northwich Victoria | 44 | (2) |
| 2008 | The New Saints | 7 | (5) |
| 2008–2009 | Droylsden | ? | (?) |
| 2010 | Melbourne Knights | 20 | (13) |
| 2010–2012 | AFC Fylde | 35 | (22) |
| 2012–2013 | Warrington Town | 17 | (2) |
| 2013–2014 | Bootle | 12 | (7) |
| 2019 | Fazakerley Veterans | 6 | (4) |
| 2019– | Warrington Town | | |

International career
| 2002 | England U19 | 1 | (0) |
- * Club domestic league appearances and goals

Kevin Townson (born 19 April 1983) is an English professional footballer who plays as a forward for Warrington Town.

== Career ==
Townson was born in Liverpool, England. He played for Rochdale and Macclesfield Town in the Football League. He won the Bill Fleming Media Player of the Year in the Victorian Premier League in 2010 for the Melbourne Knights. He has subsequently returned to England.

He also played for Fazakerley Veterans F.C.
