= Harold Jarman =

English footballer and cricketer

Personal information
- Full name: Harold James Jarman
- Date of birth: 4 May 1939 (age 87)
- Place of birth: Bristol, England
- Height: 5 ft 8 in (1.73 m)
- Position: Winger

Senior career*
Years	Team	Apps	(Gls)
1953–1956	Clifton Villa		
1956–1958	Chippenham United		
1958	Bristol St George	1	(0)
1958–1959	Victoria Athletic		
1959–1973	Bristol Rovers	452	(127)
1973–1974	Newport County	40	(8)
1974	New York Cosmos	18	(4)
1974–1976	Mangotsfield United	75	(40)
1976–1978	Portway Bristol	52	(18)

Managerial career
- 1976–1978: Portway Bristol (player-manager)
- 1979–1980: Bristol Rovers
- 1988: Bath City
- 1989–1992: Mangotsfield United
- Cricket career
Personal information
- Height: 5 ft 8 in (1.73 m)
- Batting: Right-handed
- Bowling: Right-arm Medium
- Role: Batsman
Domestic team information
- Years: Team
- 1961–1971: Gloucestershire
- First-class debut: 8 July 1961 Gloucestershire v Middlesex
- Last First-class: 17 July 1971 Gloucestershire v Yorkshire
- List A debut: 18 May 1969 Gloucestershire v Lancashire
- Last List A: 28 July 1971 Gloucestershire v Lancashire
Career statistics
Competition	FC	List A
Matches	45	13
Runs scored	1041	88
Batting average	18.58	12.57
100s/50s	0/3	0/0
Top score	67*	17*
Balls bowled	235	0
Wickets	0	–
Bowling average	n/a	–
5 wickets in innings	–	–
10 wickets in match	–	–
Best bowling	n/a	–
Catches/stumpings	20/0	9/0
- Source: ESPN cricinfo
- * Club domestic league appearances and goals

Harold James Jarman (born 4 May 1939) is an English former professional footballer and first-class cricketer. He spent the majority of his lengthy footballing career with Bristol Rovers, where he is the club's third-highest goalscorer of all time and was inducted into their Hall of Fame in April 2021.

He also had a single season with each of Newport County and New York Cosmos, as well as representing several non-league football clubs, including Bristol St George, Chippenham United, Mangotsfield United, and Portway Bristol where he was player-manager.

After ending his playing career he remained in football, most notably as manager of Bristol Rovers, Bath City and Mangotsfield United. He also held a number of coaching and scouting positions, including roles at Blackburn Rovers and Norwich City.

While he is primarily known as a footballer, he also played professional cricket in the summers throughout the 1960s, up until 1971, for Gloucestershire County Cricket Club, representing the county at both first-class and List A levels.

== Early life ==
Harold Jarman was born on 4 May 1939 in the Cliftonwood area of Bristol to parents William and Catherine Jarman (née Harris). Just months after Harold's birth his father contracted a viral infection that left him permanently blinded and unable to work, meaning Harold's mother had to take a number of jobs throughout his childhood as well as care for her family and husband.

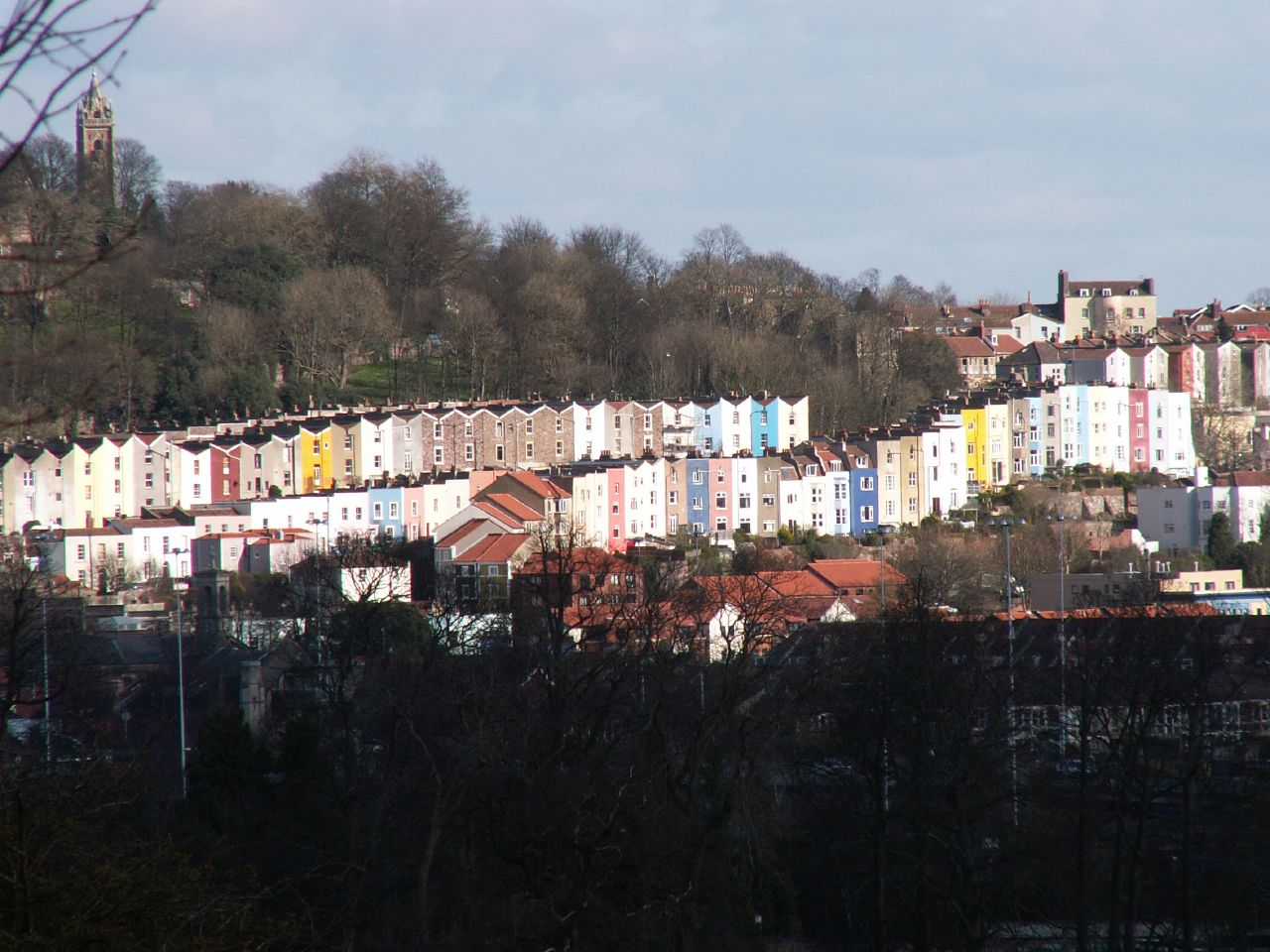
Jarman was born on Ambra Vale South, Cliftonwood, which is visible to the left of the photo

He began attending Hotwells Primary School from 1944, Hotwells being a short walk from the family home, then went to Penpole School in Shirehampton for a year in 1950 before moving to the nearby Portway Boys' School in 1951. He only remained at Portway school for a year, and in 1952 he moved school again when he passed the entrance exam for the Bristol Technical School (Building) in the Barton Hill area of Bristol.

During his childhood Jarman showed an aptitude for both cricket and football, representing his primary school in both sports. Between the ages of 13 and 16 he took part in coaching sessions for talented local cricketers organised by the Bristol Evening Post newspaper, with the sessions led by Gloucestershire player Len Harbin. He was also selected for the Bristol Boys cricket team, captaining the side for two years, but although he showed a similar talent for football he was never chosen to join the Bristol Boys football team as he was considered too small for the more physical game.

== Footballing career ==
=== As a player ===
==== Amateur football ====
Jarman's debut in senior football came in 1953, when still aged only 14 he turned out for Clifton Villa Reserves in the Bristol Downs League. He made an immediate impact in the team, scoring four goals in an 11–1 victory. By the time he was 16 he was playing regularly in the Clifton Villa first team alongside his brother, Bill Jarman. After a trial with West Bromwich Albion in 1955, Harold joined Chippenham United in 1956, and played a single match for Bristol St George in 1958 before joining Victoria Athletic in the Bristol Premier Combination. Jarman had built up a strong reputation in the local footballing community and this was recognised by Bristol Rovers, who signed him on 7 August 1959.

==== Bristol Rovers ====
After signing for Bristol Rovers in the summer, Jarman made his first team debut on Boxing Day 1959 in a Football League Second Division match against Swansea Town. Rovers won the game 3–1, thanks to two goals from Alfie Biggs and one from Geoff Bradford in front of a crowd of 16,501 at Eastville Stadium.

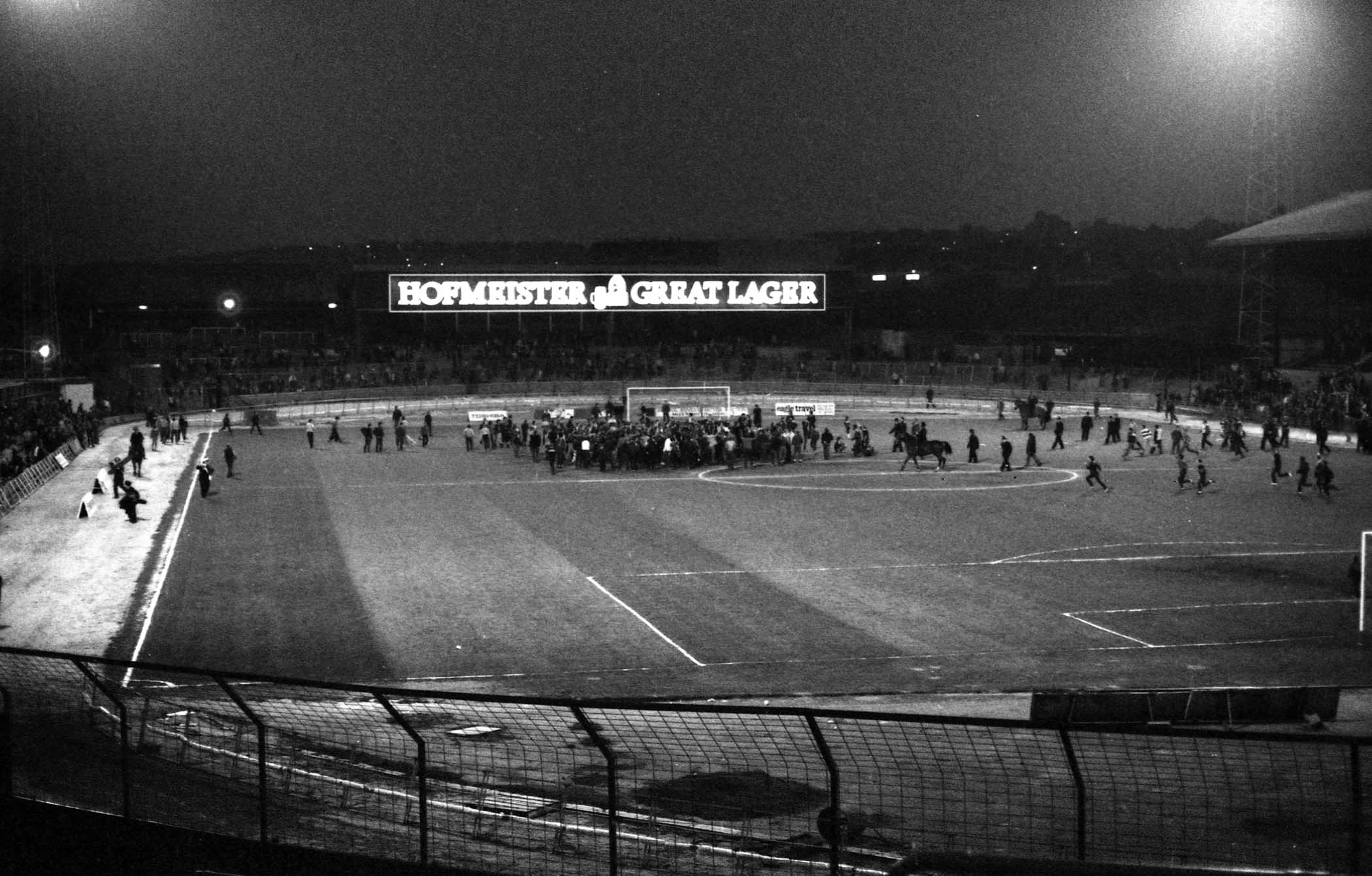
Eastville Stadium, the home of Bristol Rovers when Jarman played for the club

Jarman earned himself a place in the Pirates history books in just his second season with the club, on 26 September 1960, when he scored Bristol Rovers' first ever goal in the Football League Cup. Rovers had the honour of participating in the first game ever played in the competition when they faced First Division side Fulham in the opening round of the 1960–61 tournament. Maurice Cook had given Fulham the lead in the 9th minute, scoring the first ever goal in the competition, but Jarman equalised seventeen minutes later to seal his place in Rovers folklore. Geoff Bradford added a second goal for Rovers later on, giving them a shock victory over their top-flight opponents.

Throughout the 1960s Jarman was a firm favourite with the Eastville Stadium crowd and the chant "Harold, Harold" was regularly heard echoing around the ground.

To celebrate the landmark of his 500th appearance for Bristol Rovers, Jarman was handed the captain's armband for a Division Three match against Tranmere Rovers on 13 January 1973. Bristol Rovers won the match 2–0, but the occasion was overshadowed by a serious injury to their goalkeeper Dick Sheppard who was carried off by ambulancemen following a collision with Tranmere's Eddie Loyden during the first half. After this the game became a bad tempered affair with the Rovers players aggrieved that Loyden hadn't been sent off, leading to numerous heavy tackles and confrontations between the two teams. It was later revealed that Sheppard had suffered a depressed fracture of the skull in the game, effectively ending his professional career.

By the time he finally left the Pirates Jarman had started 440 Football League matches, and made a further twelve appearances as a substitute, scoring 127 goals. He has made the sixth-highest number of League appearances of anyone who has played for the club, and is the third highest scorer in the club's history.

==== Newport County ====
Jarman left Bristol Rovers on 14 May 1973 and made the short move across the Severn Bridge to join Newport County, along with teammate Brian Godfrey who also made the same move. That summer Jarman played against Bristol Rovers for his new club in a pre-season friendly. He was on the scoresheet in a 2–2 draw that also saw some fighting break out amongst the two sets of supporters.

In December 1973 Jarman was in the Newport side that faced Torquay United in a Division Four match at Plainmoor. In goal for the Devon side that day was Jarman's friend and former teammate Dick Sheppard, who was on loan from Bristol Rovers and attempting to make a comeback after being so seriously injured eleven months earlier in Jarman's 500th match. Late in the game Sheppard conceded a penalty, which Jarman stepped up to take and scored. The goal was little more than a consolation for Newport however as they still lost 3–2. This was one of only two appearances Sheppard made for Torquay, and he would go on to play one more time for Rovers before finally retiring from professional football.

At the end of the 1973–74 season though Jarman was deemed surplus to requirements at Newport and was told he could leave on a free transfer. At this point, prior to the 1995 Bosman ruling, players did not have to be released at the end of their contracts so Newport could have demanded a transfer fee for him if they felt he had any value and if they had wanted to do so.

After leaving Newport Jarman wouldn't play in the Football League again. Over the course of his career he made a total of 474 Football League appearances, plus a further 18 from the substitute's bench, scoring 135 goals in a fourteen-year period between 1959 and 1973.

==== New York and non-league ====
In 1974, Gordon Bradley, manager of the New York Cosmos, brought Jarman into the team to replace young American striker Joey Fink who had scored eleven goals in fourteen games in 1973. Although initially enthusiastic about his move across the Atlantic Ocean Jarman grew increasingly homesick, being separated from his young family who had remained in Bristol. He produced only four goals in eighteen games before he was released and returned to his home city.

By this point Jarman had grown disillusioned with professional football and had decided that he wouldn't try to find a new League club in England. Instead he was persuaded to join Mangotsfield United by his former Bristol Rovers teammate Doug Hillard, who was now manager of the Mangos. By September 1974 he had received international clearance and was in the Mangotsfield side.

=== As a manager ===
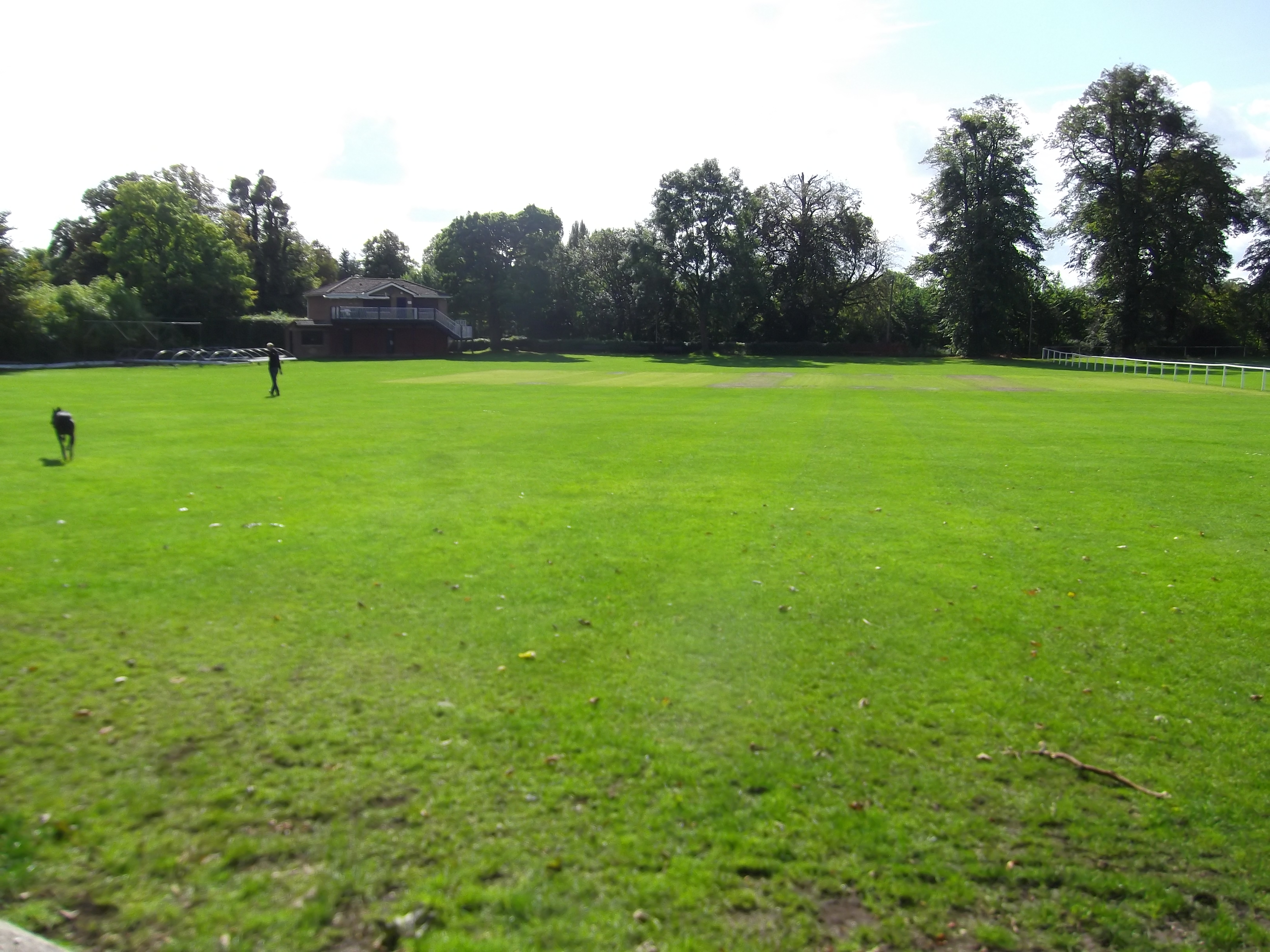
Shirehampton Recreation Ground, the former home of Portway Bristol F.C.

Jarman's fist step into football management came in 1976, when he was appointed player-manager of Portway Bristol for their debut season in Division One of the Western Football League. One of his first signings for the club after being appointed was his old friend, goalkeeper Dick Sheppard, who by now had retired from professional football. Jarman spent two years in charge of Portway Bristol, finishing in eighth place in the league during the 1976–77 season and seventh in 1977–78.

After four years out of the professional game, during which time he had been working as a carpenter, Jarman decided that he wanted to get back into full-time football and in February 1978 he successfully applied for the position of youth team coach at Bristol Rovers, replacing Colin Dobson who had recently vacated the position to join Coventry City. Jarman formed a strong working relationship with the Pirates' youth liaison officer Gordon Bennett, recruiting many talented young footballers to the club. Under Jarman's leadership the Rovers youth team had their most successful period up to that point, finding success in both league and cup competitions. During his spell in charge they achieved their highest league position, progressed further than ever before in the FA Youth Cup, and twice won a prestigious international youth tournament in Tilburg, Netherlands.

On 13 December 1979 the Bristol Rovers' first team manager, Scotsman Bobby Campbell, was relieved of his duties following a poor run of results which had left the club near the bottom of the Division Two league table. The club appointed Jarman as caretaker manager while the vacant position was advertised and applicants were interviewed. During this spell the first team's performance improved and Jarman was rewarded by being given the job on a full-time basis.

The team's improvement in form continued until the end of the 1979–80 season, and they eventually finished six points clear of the relegation zone. One of Jarman's first actions as manager was to re-appoint Terry Cooper to the coaching staff. Cooper had been sacked a few months earlier by Jarman's predecessor, but the decision to bring him back to the club backfired on Jarman when the Bristol Rovers board opted to replace Jarman as manager with Cooper almost as soon as the season ended. Cooper initially kept Jarman on as his assistant manager, but fired him on 22 September 1980, along with Bobby Campbell who was by this point the club's chief scout, in order to bring in his own coaching team.

He subsequently held various coaching and scouting positions at a number of clubs, including Norwich City (where he was appointed by his former colleague Gordon Bennett), Blackburn Rovers and Manchester City, and he managed both Bath City and Mangotsfield United.

== Cricketing career ==
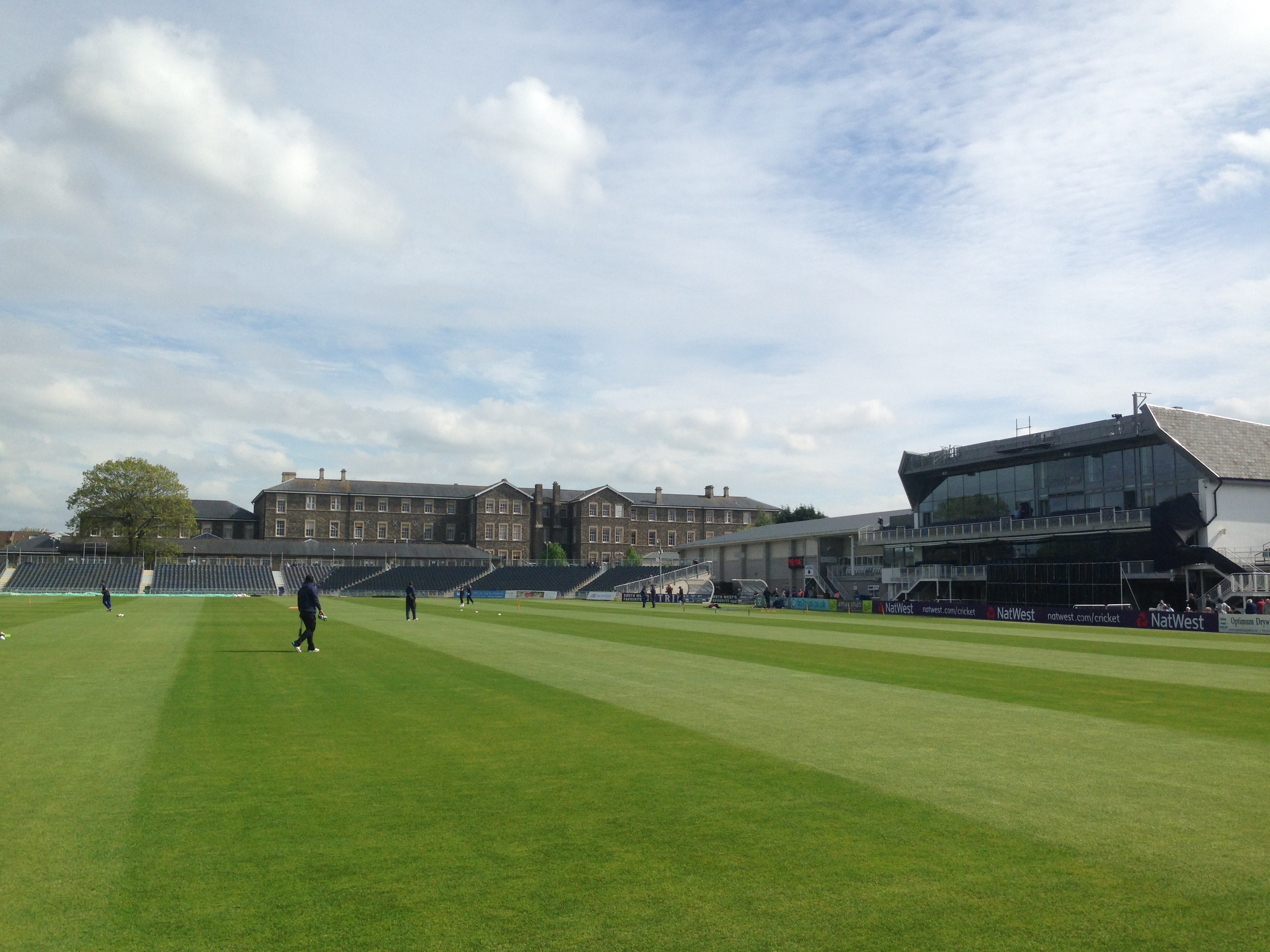
The Bristol County Ground, Gloucestershire's home ground, seen here in 2015

Jarman made his debut for the Gloucestershire first eleven on 8 July 1961 in a County Championship match against Middlesex at the Wagon Works Ground in Gloucester. Batting at number 7 in the first innings he ended on 22 not out as Gloucestershire were dismissed for 144. Coincidentally, batting at number 8 in that lineup was wicket-keeper Barrie Meyer, another dual-sport professional who like Jarman also played football for Bristol Rovers. Jarman didn't bat in the second innings as Gloucestershire declared at 432–6 before going on to lose the match by one wicket.

He went on to play an average of about four games a season in the County Championship over an eleven-year spell, eventually making his final first class appearance against Yorkshire at Bramall Lane on 17–20 July 1971. In his last match he scored 13 not out in the first innings when Gloucestershire declared on 276–9 and scored 1 not out in the second innings, with Gloucestershire winning the match by four wickets. Overall he played 45 first-class matches between 1961 and 1971, scoring 1041 runs and making three half centuries. He also bowled 39.1 overs without taking any wickets and allowing 131 runs.

== Career statistics ==
=== Football ===
Appearances and goals by club, season and competition
Club	Season	League			FA Cup		League Cup		Other (Note: Other fixtures were in the Gloucestershire Senior Professional Cup for Bristol Rovers and in the Welsh Cup for Newport County.)		Total	
Club	Season	Division	Apps	Goals	Apps	Goals	Apps	Goals	Apps	Goals	Apps	Goals
Bristol Rovers	1959–60	Division Two	3	0	0	0	–	–	0	0	3	0
Bristol Rovers	1960–61	Division Two	21	4	0	0	2	2	1	1	24	7
Bristol Rovers	1961–62	Division Two	32	6	2	0	0	0	1	0	35	6
Bristol Rovers	1962–63	Division Three	40	6	1	0	3	1	1	0	45	7
Bristol Rovers	1963–64	Division Three	46	13	4	2	5	1	1	0	56	16
Bristol Rovers	1964–65	Division Three	44	14	4	2	1	0	1	0	50	16
Bristol Rovers	1965–66	Division Three	42	13	1	0	2	2	1	1	46	16
Bristol Rovers	1966–67	Division Three	46	19	4	1	1	0	1	0	52	20
Bristol Rovers	1967–68	Division Three	25 (3)	5	3	1	1	0	1	0	30 (3)	6
Bristol Rovers	1968–69	Division Three	45	14	7	0	1	0	1	0	54	14
Bristol Rovers	1969–70	Division Three	29 (2)	10	2	0	1	0	0	0	32 (2)	10
Bristol Rovers	1970–71	Division Three	31 (2)	12	3	1	7 (1)	0	0	0	41 (3)	13
Bristol Rovers	1971–72	Division Three	18 (4)	7	2	0	6	3	0	0	26 (4)	10
Bristol Rovers	1972–73	Division Three	18 (1)	4	0	0	0	0	0	0	18 (1)	4
Bristol Rovers	Total		440 (12)	127	33	7	30 (1)	9	9	2	512 (13)	145
Newport County	1973–74	Division Four	34 (6)	8	0	0	2	2	1	1	37 (6)	11
New York Cosmos	1974	NASL	18	4	–	–	–	–	–	–	18	4
Professional career total			492 (18)	139	33	7	32 (1)	11	10	3	567 (19)	160

=== Cricket ===
First-class batting figures by season
Club	Season	Matches	Innings	Not out	Runs	High score	Average	100s	50s	Catches
Gloucestershire	1961	3	5	1	114	61	28.50	0	1	0
Gloucestershire	1962	10	19	3	277	51	17.31	0	1	4
Gloucestershire	1963	4	7	2	80	29	16.00	0	0	1
Gloucestershire	1964	6	11	2	118	25	13.11	0	0	6
Gloucestershire	1965	2	1	1	26	26*	–	0	0	0
Gloucestershire	1966	4	7	1	112	44*	18.66	0	0	0
Gloucestershire	1967	0	0	–	–	–	–	–	–	–
Gloucestershire	1968	4	6	3	119	67*	39.66	0	1	2
Gloucestershire	1969	3	4	0	52	42	13.00	0	0	1
Gloucestershire	1970	0	0	–	–	–	–	–	–	–
Gloucestershire	1971	9	14	5	143	28*	15.88	0	0	6
Total		45	74	18	1041	67*	18.58	0	3	20

First-class bowling figures by season
Club	Season	Balls	Maidens	Runs	Wickets
Gloucestershire	1961	1	0	4	0
Gloucestershire	1962	192	9	89	0
Gloucestershire	1964	18	0	19	0
Gloucestershire	1965	24	0	19	0
Total		235	9	131	0

List A batting figures by season
Club	Season	Matches	Innings	Not out	Runs	High score	Average	100s	50s	Catches
Gloucestershire	1969	4	4	1	40	17*	13.33	0	0	4
Gloucestershire	1970	0	0	–	–	–	–	–	–	–
Gloucestershire	1971 (Note: Jarman's 1971 List A matches were split between the 1971 John Player League (6 matches) and the 1971 Gillette Cup (3 matches))	9	8	4	48	14*	12.00	0	0	5
Total		13	12	5	88	17*	12.57	0	0	9

== Bibliography ==
- Byrne, Stephen; Jay, Mike (2014). Bristol Rovers: The Official Definitive History. Stroud: Amberley. ISBN 978-1-4456-3619-1.
- Byrne, Stephen; Jay, Mike (2018). Bristol Rovers Players Who's Who 1946–2018. Bristol: Mike Jay. ISBN 978-1-5272-2371-4.
- Hugman, Barry J., ed. (2015). The PFA Premier & Football League Players' Records 1946–2015. United Kingdom: G2 Entertainment. ISBN 978-1-7828-1167-1.
- Jay, Mike (1987). Bristol Rovers F.C.: A Complete Record 1883–1987. Derby: Breedon Books. ISBN 0-907969-26-7.
- Jay, Mike; Byrne, Stephen (1994). Pirates in Profile: A Who's Who of Bristol Rovers Players. Bristol: Potten, Baber & Murray. ISBN 0-9524835-0-5.
- Jay, Mike; Haddrell, Ian (2014). Harold Jarman: Bristol Rovers Local Hero. Stroud: The History Press. ISBN 978-0-7509-5600-0.
