= Kirtys MacKenzie =

English footballer

Personal information
- Full name: Kirtys MacKenzie
- Date of birth: 17 October 1993 (age 33)
- Place of birth: Newham, England
- Position: Defender

Youth career
- 2010–2012: Torquay United

Senior career*
Years	Team	Apps	(Gls)
2012–2014	Torquay United	1	(0)
2013	→ Taunton Town (loan)	4	(0)
2013	→ Gloucester City (loan)	4	(0)
2014	Chelmsford City	0	(0)
2015	Frome Town	0	(0)
2020–2021	Dunmow Town	6	(2)
Total		15	(2)
- * Club domestic league appearances and goals as of 22:55, 24 January 2022 (UTC)

Kirtys MacKenzie (born 17 October 1993) is an English former footballer.

== Career ==
MacKenzie graduated from the Torquay United youth academy, and came into the first team picture at the start of the 2012–13 season, after a suspension to Aaron Downes exposed the "Gulls" lack of established centre-halves. He made his debut on 1 September 2012, in a 1–1 draw with Port Vale at Vale Park. Manager Martin Ling said that he had an "outstanding game". In March 2013, he joined Taunton Town on loan until the end of the season.

After his release from Torquay United in January 2014, MacKenzie joined Conference South team Chelmsford City in September 2014. However, MacKenzie did not make an appearance for Chelmsford City in his time at the club. MacKenzie signed for Frome Town during the 2015–16 season, before leaving the club in October 2015 after manager Nick Bunyard expressed concerns about MacKenzie's commute to Somerset from his home in London.

During the 2020–21 season, MacKenzie signed for newly formed Essex and Suffolk Border League club Dunmow Town. MacKenzie made eight appearances, scoring twice, in all competitions for the club during the season.

== Personal life ==
On 1 August 2024, MacKenzie was jailed for four years and three months, following a group assault in East Ham.

== Statistics ==
Season	Club	Division	League		FA Cup		League Cup		Other		Total	
Season	Club	Division	Apps	Goals	Apps	Goals	Apps	Goals	Apps	Goals	Apps	Goals
2012–13	Torquay United	League Two	1	0	0	0	0	0	0	0	1	0
Total			1	0	0	0	0	0	0	0	1	0
Career total			1	0	0	0	0	0	0	0	1	0
