= 2012–13 Torquay United F.C. season =

Torquay United
2012–13 season
- Chairman: Simon Baker
- Manager: Martin Ling (until 28 January 2013); Shaun Taylor (caretaker until 20 February 2013); Alan Knill
- League Two: 19th
- FA Cup: First Round
- League Cup: First Round
- League Trophy: Second Round
- Top goalscorer: League: Rene Howe (16); All: Rene Howe (16)
- Highest home attendance: 5,666 vs. Bristol Rovers; 27 April 2013 (League Two)
- Lowest home attendance: 1,280 vs. Yeovil Town; 16 October 2012 (League Trophy)
- Average home league attendance: 2,518
Home colours	Away colours

The 2012–13 Torquay United F.C. season was Torquay United's 77th season in the Football League and their fourth consecutive season in League Two. The season ran from 1 July 2012 to 30 June 2013.

== First team squad ==
Note: Flags indicate national team as defined under FIFA eligibility rules; some limited exceptions apply. Players may hold more than one non-FIFA nationality.

No.	Pos.	Nation	Player
1	GK	ENG	Michael Poke
2	DF	ENG	Joe Oastler
3	DF	ENG	Kevin Nicholson
4	DF	AUS	Aaron Downes
5	DF	ENG	Brian Saah
6	MF	ENG	Damon Lathrope
7	MF	ENG	Lee Mansell
8	FW	ENG	Ryan Jarvis
9	FW	ENG	Rene Howe
11	MF	IRL	Ian Morris
12	DF	ENG	Daniel Leadbitter
13	GK	ENG	Martin Rice

No.	Pos.	Nation	Player
14	MF	ENG	Lloyd Macklin
15	FW	WAL	Billy Bodin
16	DF	ENG	Angus MacDonald (on loan from Reading)
18	MF	SCO	Craig Easton
19	MF	ENG	Danny Stevens
20	MF	WAL	Nathan Craig
21	DF	ENG	Thomas Cruise
23	FW	ENG	Ashley Yeoman
26	FW	ENG	Elliot Benyon (on loan from Southend United)
29	MF	ENG	Niall Thompson

== End of season honours ==
At the end of the 2012–13 season four awards were given out, for Young Player of the Season, Top Goalscorer, Players' Player of the Season and Supporters' Player of the Season.

- Young Player of the Season – Daniel Sullivan
- Top Goalscorer – Rene Howe
- Players' Player of the Season – Brian Saah
- Supporters' Player of the Season – Aaron Downes

== League Two ==
=== League table ===
Pos	Team	Pld	W	D	L	GF	GA	GD	Pts
17	York City	46	12	19	15	50	60	−10	55
18	Accrington Stanley	46	14	12	20	51	68	−17	54
19	Torquay United	46	13	14	19	55	62	−7	53
20	AFC Wimbledon	46	14	11	21	54	76	−22	53
21	Plymouth Argyle	46	13	13	20	46	55	−9	52

Updated to match(es) played on 27 April 2013. Source: BBC Sport
Rules for classification: 1) Points; 2) Goal difference; 3) Number of goals scored

=== Results summary ===
Overall								Home						Away					
Pld	W	D	L	GF	GA	GD	Pts	W	D	L	GF	GA	GD	W	D	L	GF	GA	GD
46	13	14	19	55	62	−7	53	9	6	8	38	40	−2	4	8	11	17	22	−5

Last updated: 9 March 2013.
Source: Torquay United

=== Results by round ===
Round	1	2	3	4	5	6	7	8	9	10	11	12	13	14	15	16	17	18	19	20	21	22	23	24	25	26	27	28	29	30	31	32	33	34	35	36	37	38	39	40	41	42	43	44	45	46
Ground	A	H	H	A	H	A	A	H	A	H	A	H	A	H	H	A	A	H	A	H	A	H	A	H	A	H	A	A	H	H	A	A	H	H	A	H	A	A	H	H	A	H	A	H	A	H
Result	D	D	W	D	D	L	W	D	D	W	L	W	L	W	W	L	D	L	W	W	L	D	D	L	L	D	W	L	L	L	L	L	L	L	D	L	D	D	W	W	L	L	L	W	W	D
Position	14	15	8	11	11	17	12	14	15	9	11	10	10	8	7	7	8	12	13	8	10	11	12	15	16	16	13	16	17	18	19	19	19	20	20	22	22	20	19	19	19	21	22	20	18	19

Updated to match(es) played on 9 March 2013. Source: Torquay United
A = Away; H = Home; W = Win; D = Draw; L = Loss

== Results ==
=== League Two ===
18 August 2012	Fleetwood Town	0–0	Torquay United	Highbury Stadium
15:00 BST	Nicholson (yellow card) 85'	Report		Attendance: 3,624; Referee: Chris Sarginson

21 August 2012	Torquay United	2–2	Cheltenham Town	Plainmoor
19:45 BST	Downes 22'; Howe 23'	Report	Harrad 15'; Zebroski 80'; Hooman (yellow card) 85'	Attendance: 2,517; Referee: Mick Russell

25 August 2012	Torquay United	4–2	Rochdale	Plainmoor
15:00 BST	Bodin 12'; Downes 34' (red card) 74'; Howe 60' 68' (yellow card) 73'	Report	Tutte 8'; Edwards (yellow card) 45'; Pearson (yellow card) 73'; Putterill 85'; McIntyre (yellow card) 90+4'	Attendance: 2,731; Referee: Gavin Ward

1 September 2012	Port Vale	1–1	Torquay United	Vale Park
15:00 BST	Saah 69' (o.g.)	Report	Morris 39'; Howe (yellow card) 59'	Attendance: 4,721; Referee: Steve Bratt

8 September 2012	Torquay United	0–0	Plymouth Argyle	Plainmoor
15:00 BST	Craig (yellow card) 45'; Howe (yellow card) 84'	Report	Berry (yellow card) 6'; Hourihane (yellow card) 8'	Attendance: 4,932; Referee: Roger East

15 September 2012	Rotherham United	1–0	Torquay United	New York Stadium
15:00 BST	Revell 34'; Pringle (yellow card) 38'; Sharps (yellow card) 40'; Hunt (yellow card) 90'	Report	Downes (yellow card) 17'	Attendance: 7,405; Referee: Jeremy Simpson

18 September 2012	AFC Wimbledon	0–1	Torquay United	Kingsmeadow
15:00 BST	Jolley (yellow card) 72' (yellow-red card) 89'; Moore (yellow card) 84'	Report	Howe 34'; Mansell (yellow card) 74'; Oastler (yellow card) 90+2'	Attendance: 3,350; Referee: David Coote

22 September 2012	Torquay United	1–1	Burton Albion	Plainmoor
15:00 BST	Howe 12'	Report	McCrory (yellow card) 45+1'; Zola 89'; Kee (yellow card) 90+1'	Attendance: 2,438; Referee: Tim Robinson

29 September 2012	Chesterfield	1–1	Torquay United	Proact Stadium
15:00 BST	Atkinson (yellow card) 25'; Darikwa 48'	Report	Oastler (yellow card) 39'; Howe 51'	Attendance: 5,117; Referee: Eddie Ilderton

2 October 2012	Torquay United	4–3	Aldershot Town	Plainmoor
19:45 BST	Oastler (yellow card) 36'; Bodin 48'; Downes (yellow card) 59'; Jarvis 69'; Yeoman 84'; Howe 89'	Report	Reid 28' 37' (pen.) 47'; Hylton (yellow card) 57'	Attendance: 2,358; Referee: Stuart Attwell

6 October 2012	Wycombe Wanderers	2–1	Torquay United	Adams Park
15:00 BST	Doherty 33'; Scowen (yellow card) 56' (goal) 63'; Dunne (yellow card) 75'	Report	Howe 42'	Attendance: 4,205; Referee: Darren Drysdale

13 October 2012	Torquay United	3–1	Accrington Stanley	Plainmoor
15:00 BST	Howe 5' (pen.) (yellow card) 73'; Bodin 67'; Mansell 80'	Report	Murphy (yellow card) 45'; Amond 65'	Attendance: 2,474; Referee: Simon Hooper

20 October 2012	Bristol Rovers	3–2	Torquay United	Memorial Stadium
15:00 BST	Eaves 15' 76'; Lund 17'	Report	Poke (yellow card) 4'; Oastler (yellow card) 21' (yellow-red card) 30'; Howe 53'; Downes 59'	Attendance: 6,331; Referee: Scott Mathieson

23 October 2012	Torquay United	2–1	Gillingham	Plainmoor
19:45 BST	Downes (yellow card) 37'; Leadbitter (yellow card) 44'; Craig 56'; Nicholson 84'	Report	Fish (yellow card) 50'; Burton 53'	Attendance: 2,251; Referee: Brendan Malone

27 October 2012	Torquay United	1–0	Morecambe	Plainmoor
15:00 BST	Stevens 30'; Leadbitter (yellow card) 84'; Poke (yellow card) 89'	Report	McDonald (yellow card) 78'	Attendance: 2,457; Referee: Carl Berry

6 November 2012	Barnet	1–0	Torquay United	Underhill
20:00 GMT	Kamdjo 79'; Pearce (yellow card) 90+3'; Stack (yellow card) 90+3'	Report	Easton (yellow card) 20'; Howe (yellow card) 89'; Downes (yellow card) 90+3'	Attendance: 1,544; Referee: Darren Deadman

10 November 2012	Oxford United	0–0	Torquay United	Kassam Stadium
15:00 GMT	Cox (yellow card) 52'	Report		Attendance: 5,773; Referee: Bobby Madley

17 November 2012	Torquay United	1–4	Southend United	Plainmoor
15:00 GMT	Jarvis 52'; Mansell (red card) 56'; Howe (yellow card) 62'	Report	Tomlin 10' 46'; Assombalonga 39' 45'; Barker (yellow card) 61'; Phillips (yellow card) 80'	Attendance: 2,449; Referee: Andy Davies

24 November 2012	York City	0–2	Torquay United	Bootham Crescent
15:00 GMT		Report	Stevens 10'; Oastler 61' (yellow card) 73'; Howe (yellow card) 87'	Attendance: 3,174; Referee: Rob Lewis

1 December 2012	Torquay United	2–1	Dagenham & Redbridge	Plainmoor
15:00 GMT	Stevens 36'; Ogogo 80' (o.g.); Oastler (yellow card) 84'	Report	Ogogo (yellow card) 65'; Elito (yellow card) 67'; Saunders 73'	Attendance: 2,069; Referee: James Adcock

8 December 2012	Bradford City	1–0	Torquay United	Valley Parade
15:00 GMT	Connell 85'	Report	Saah (red card) 35'; Thompson (yellow card) 55'; MacDonald (yellow card) 88'	Attendance: 9,347; Referee: Darren Bond

15 December 2012	Torquay United	1–1	Northampton Town	Plainmoor
15:00 GMT	Jarvis 62'	Report	Langsmead (yellow card) 36' (goal) 90+5'; Akinfenwa (yellow card) 63'; Carlisle (yellow card) 66'	Attendance: 2,302; Referee: Christopher Sarginson

26 December 2012	Plymouth Argyle	1–1	Torquay United	Home Park
13:00 GMT	Hourihane (yellow card) 83'; Harvey 90'	Report	Downes 78'	Attendance: 10,003; Referee: Graham Salisbury

1 January 2013	Torquay United	2–3	AFC Wimbledon	Plainmoor
15:00 GMT	Mansell 9'; MacDonald (yellow card) 82'; Howe (yellow card) 88' (goal) 90'	Report	McCallum 5'; Mitchel-King 33'; Long 90+4' (pen.)	Attendance: 2,618; Referee: Oliver Langford

12 January 2013	Burton Albion	2–1	Torquay United	Pirelli Stadium
15:00 GMT	Zola 59'; Paterson 84'	Report	Jarvis 43'; Howe (yellow card) 63'	Attendance: 2,356; Referee: Tony Harrington

15 January 2013	Torquay United	1–1	Exeter City	Plainmoor
20:00 GMT	Howe 15' (pen.); Saah (yellow card) 82'	Report	Bennett (yellow card) 15'; Tully (yellow card) 79'; Gow 84' (pen.)	Attendance: 4,476; Referee: Craig Pawson

28 January 2013	Exeter City	0–1	Torquay United	St James Park
19:45 GMT		Report	Howe 17' (pen.); Mansell (yellow card) 48'; Lathrope (yellow card) 82'	Attendance: 4,824; Referee: James Adcock

2 February 2013	Cheltenham Town	2–1	Torquay United	Whaddon Road
15:00 GMT	Lowe 33'; Harrad 51'; McGlashan (yellow card) 88'	Report	Howe (yellow card) 53' (goal) 88'; Lathrope (yellow card) 20'	Attendance: 2,961; Referee: Carl Berry

9 February 2013	Torquay United	0–1	Fleetwood Town	Plainmoor
15:00 GMT		Report	Atkinson (yellow card) 10'; Parkin 26'; Davies (yellow card) 89'	Attendance: 2,207; Referee: Phil Gibbs

12 February 2013	Torquay United	1–3	Rotherham United	Plainmoor
19:45 GMT	Downes (yellow card) 77'; Macklin (yellow card) 81'; Bodin 90' (pen.)	Report	Davis (yellow card) 39'; Frecklington 46'; Revell 59'; Odejayi 90+1'	Attendance: 1,778; Referee: Brendan Malone

16 February 2013	Rochdale	1–0	Torquay United	Spotland Stadium
15:00 GMT	Bennett 18'; Donnelly (yellow card) 46'	Report		Attendance: 2,351; Referee: Andy Davies

19 February 2013	Aldershot Town	1–0	Torquay United	Recreation Ground
19:45 GMT	Brown 83'	Report	Mansell (yellow card) 77'; Howe (yellow card) 89'	Attendance: 2,095; Referee: Mick Russell

23 February 2013	Torquay United	0–1	Port Vale	Plainmoor
15:00 GMT		Report	Burge (yellow card) 16'; Andrew 28'; Purse (yellow card) 55'	Attendance: 2,679; Referee: Keith Hill

26 February 2013	Torquay United	1–2	Wycombe Wanderers	Plainmoor
19:45 GMT	Jarvis 37'	Report	Wood 76'; McClure 81'	Attendance: 1,793; Referee: Mark Haywood

2 March 2013	Accrington Stanley	0–0	Torquay United	Crown Ground
15:00 GMT	Hunt (yellow card) 44'	Report	Oastler (yellow card) 52'	Attendance: 1,197; Referee: Jeremy Simpson

9 March 2013	Torquay United	1–3	Oxford United	Plainmoor
15:00 GMT	Downes 58'; Howe (yellow card) 62'	Report	Constable 50'; Batt 54' (pen.); Heslop 90+5'	Attendance: 2,504; Referee: Stephen Martin

12 March 2013	Dagenham & Redbridge	2–2	Torquay United	Victoria Road
19:45 GMT	Elito 4' (pen.); Ogogo (yellow card) 75'; Scott 84'; Wilkinson (yellow card) 88'	Report	Downes (red card) 4'; Labadie 71' (yellow card) 84'; Mansell (yellow card) 84'; Howe 89' (pen.)	Attendance: 1,227; Referee: Keith Stroud

16 March 2013	Southend United	1–1	Torquay United	Roots Hall
15:00 GMT	Eastwood 9'	Report	Howe (yellow card) 22'; Labadie 45+2' (yellow card) 57'; Oastler (yellow card) 48'	Attendance: 4,891; Referee: David Phillips

19 March 2013	Torquay United	2–1	Chesterfield	Plainmoor
19:45 GMT	Labadie 2' (yellow card) 53'; Howe 8'; Saah (yellow card) 12'; Benyon (yellow card) 36'; MacDonald (yellow card) 56'	Report	Lester (yellow card) 56'; Cooper 77'; Randall (yellow card) 90+2'	Attendance: 2,047; Referee: Stuart Attwell

23 March 2013	Torquay United	2–1	York City	Plainmoor
15:00 GMT	Benyon 6'; Jarvis 23'; MacDonald (yellow card) 69'; Cruise (red card) 73'; Poke (yellow card) 88'	Report	Cresswell 73' (pen.); McGurk (yellow card) 84'	Attendance: 2,871; Referee: Roger East

27 March 2013	Northampton Town	1–0	Torquay United	Sixfields Stadium
19:45 GMT	O'Donovan (yellow card) 77' (goal) 85'; Demontagnac (yellow card) 78'	Report	Howe (yellow card) 29'; Benyon (yellow card) 42'; Labadie (yellow card) 73'; Bodin (yellow card) 75'	Attendance: 5,166; Referee: Darren Sheldrake

1 April 2013	Torquay United	1–3	Bradford City	Plainmoor
15:00 GMT	Labadie 3'; Jarvis (yellow card) 49'	Report	McArdle 7'; Thompson 18'; Ravenhill (yellow card) 43'; Hanson 48'	Attendance: 2,569; Referee: Rob Lewis

6 April 2013	Gillingham	1–0	Torquay United	Priestfield Stadium
15:00 GMT	Kedwell 48'	Report	Nicholson (yellow card) 82'	Attendance: 7,574; Referee: Andrew Madley

16 April 2013	Torquay United	3–2	Barnet	Plainmoor
19:45 GMT	Benyon 25'; Bodin 60'; Oastler (yellow card) 68'; Saah (yellow card) 30' (goal) 71'	Report	Yiadom (yellow card) 45+1'; Davids (yellow card) 72'; Hyde 58' 77'	Attendance: 2,722; Referee: Andy Woolmer

20 April 2013	Morecambe	0–2	Torquay United	Globe Arena
15:00 GMT	Doyle (yellow card) 9' (yellow-red card) 24'; Drummond 28' (o.g.); Williams (yellow card) 54'	Report	Downes (yellow card) 44'; Yeoman 69'; Howe (yellow card) 80'	Attendance: 2,033; Referee: Darren Bond

27 April 2013	Torquay United	3–3	Bristol Rovers	Plainmoor
15:00 GMT	Poke (yellow card) 47'; Benyon 52' (yellow card) 53' (goal) 68'; Jarvis 55' (o.g.) 62'	Report	Hitchcock 31' (yellow card) 79'; Harrison (yellow card) 45+1'; Harrold 90+4' (yellow card) 90+5'	Attendance: 5,666; Referee: Darren Deadman

=== FA Cup ===
3 Nov 2012 First Round	Torquay United	0–1	Harrogate Town	Plainmoor
15:00 GMT		Report	Chilaka 20'	Attendance: 1,817; Referee: Wayne Barratt

=== League Cup ===
14 Aug 2012 First Round	Torquay United	0–4	Leicester City	Plainmoor
19:45 BST		Report	Dyer 21'; Marshall 35'; James 49'; Vardy 77'	Attendance: 3,367; Referee: Oliver Langford

=== League Trophy ===
16 Oct 2012 Second Round	Torquay United	2–2 (4–5 p)	Yeovil Town	Plainmoor
19:45 BST	Jarvis 24' 57'	Report	Hayter 38' 90'; Marsh-Brown (yellow card) 79'	Attendance: 1,280; Referee: Andy Woolmer
	Penalties
	Mansell (penalty scored); Craig (penalty scored); Cruise (penalty missed); Bodin (penalty scored); Howe (penalty scored)		Hayter (penalty scored); Upson (penalty scored); Williams (penalty scored); McAllister (penalty scored); Marsh-Brown (penalty scored)

=== Friendlies ===
20 Jul 2012	Torquay United	3–0	Royal Marines	Plainmoor
19:30 BST	Stevens 6'; O'Kane 17' (pen.); Mansell 79'	Report		Attendance: 612

24 Jul 2012	Torquay United	2–0	Tiverton Town	Plainmoor
19:30 BST	Yeoman 36'; Stevens 68'	Report

27 Jul 2012	Torquay United	1–2	Leeds United	Plainmoor
19:00 BST	MacKenzie 75'	Report	McCormack 7', 11'	Attendance: 3,925; Referee: Brendan Malone

31 Jul 2012	Exeter City	3–3	Torquay United	St James Park
19:45 BST	Davies 15'; Cureton 22'; Keohane 90'	Report	Macklin 35'; Downes 45'; Bodin 50'	Attendance: 1,551

3 Aug 2012	Bideford	0–5	Torquay United	The Sports Ground
19:30 BST		Report	Jarvis; Saah; Morris; Howe

6 Aug 2012	Torquay United	1–1	Stoke City	Plainmoor
19:30 BST	Bodin 78'	Report	Etherington 41'	Attendance: 2,155; Referee: Steve Bratt

10 Aug 2012	Weston-super-Mare	0–3	Torquay United	Woodspring Stadium
19:15 BST		Report	Mansell (pen.); Bodin; Howe

4 Sep 2012	Torquay United	1–1	Nike Academy	Plainmoor
14:00 BST	Jarvis 81'	Report	Folyton-Brown 52'	Referee: Jason Haywood

19 Sep 2012	Torquay United	2–1	AFC Bournemouth	Plainmoor
13:00 BST	Yeoman 28'; MacKenzie 87'	Report	Stockley 6' (red card) 53'; Chiedozie (yellow card) 70'	Referee: Adam Hopkins

=== Devon St Luke's Bowl ===
4 Dec 2012 Second Round	Liverton United	2–2 (0–3 p)	Torquay United	Coach Road
19:30 GMT	Rudge 11' (pen.); Chamberlain 52'	Report	Halpin 7'; Cruise 75'	Referee: Marc Whaley
	Penalties
	Laughton (penalty missed); Kingscote (penalty missed); Fenner (penalty missed)		Halpin (penalty scored); Thompson (penalty scored); Sullivan (penalty missed); Baker (penalty scored)

16 Jan 2013 Quarter Final	Buckland Athletic	1–3	Torquay United	Homers Heath
19:45 GMT	Revell 11'	Report	May 24'; Halpin 55' 63' (pen.)	Referee: David Goard

== Club statistics ==
=== First team appearances ===
As of 11 May 2013

No.	Pos	Nat	Player	Total		League Two		FA Cup		League Cup		League Trophy	
No.	Pos	Nat	Player	Apps	Goals	Apps	Goals	Apps	Goals	Apps	Goals	Apps	Goals
1	GK	(England) ENG	Michael Poke	46	0	43+0	0	1+0	0	1+0	0	1+0	0
2	DF	(England) ENG	Joe Oastler	40	1	37+1	1	0+0	0	1+0	0	0+1	0
3	DF	(England) ENG	Kevin Nicholson	43	1	40+1	1	1+0	0	1+0	0	0+0	0
4	DF	(Australia) AUS	Aaron Downes	41	5	38+0	5	1+0	0	1+0	0	1+0	0
5	DF	(England) ENG	Brian Saah	46	1	43+0	1	1+0	0	1+0	0	1+0	0
6	MF	(England) ENG	Damon Lathrope	30	0	21+7	0	1+0	0	1+0	0	0+0	0
7	MF	(England) ENG	Lee Mansell	45	2	42+0	2	1+0	0	1+0	0	1+0	0
8	FW	(England) ENG	Ryan Jarvis	40	9	25+12	7	0+1	0	1+0	0	1+0	2
9	FW	(England) ENG	Rene Howe	45	16	42+0	16	1+0	0	1+0	0	0+1	0
11	MF	(Ireland) EIR	Ian Morris	12	1	9+2	1	0+0	0	1+0	0	0+0	0
12	DF	(England) ENG	Daniel Leadbitter	15	0	9+4	0	1+0	0	0+0	0	1+0	0
13	GK	(England) ENG	Martin Rice	5	0	3+2	0	0+0	0	0+0	0	0+0	0
14	MF	(England) ENG	Lloyd Macklin	16	0	3+13	0	0+0	0	0+0	0	0+0	0
15	FW	(Wales) WAL	Billy Bodin	45	5	40+3	5	1+0	0	0+0	0	1+0	0
16	DF	(England) ENG	Angus MacDonald	14	0	10+4	0	0+0	0	0+0	0	0+0	0
17	MF	(England) ENG	Saul Halpin	2	0	0+2	0	0+0	0	0+0	0	0+0	0
18	MF	(Scotland) SCO	Craig Easton	23	0	18+3	0	0+0	0	1+0	0	1+0	0
19	MF	(England) ENG	Danny Stevens	25	3	15+8	3	1+0	0	0+0	0	1+0	0
20	MF	(Wales) WAL	Nathan Craig	32	1	28+2	1	1+0	0	0+0	0	1+0	0
21	DF	(England) ENG	Thomas Cruise	18	0	6+10	0	0+0	0	0+1	0	1+0	0
22	MF	(England) ENG	Karl Baker	0	0	0+0	0	0+0	0	0+0	0	0+0	0
23	FW	(England) ENG	Ashley Yeoman	14	2	4+9	2	0+0	0	0+1	0	0+0	0
24	MF	(England) ENG	Joss Labadie	7	4	7+0	4	0+0	0	0+0	0	0+0	0
25	MF	(England) ENG	Jordan Chapell	6	0	5+1	0	0+0	0	0+0	0	0+0	0
26	FW	(England) ENG	Elliot Benyon	15	5	12+3	5	0+0	0	0+0	0	0+0	0
28	DF	(England) ENG	George Artemi	0	0	0+0	0	0+0	0	0+0	0	0+0	0
29	MF	(England) ENG	Niall Thompson	21	0	3+15	0	0+1	0	0+1	0	0+1	0
30	DF	(England) ENG	Kyrtis MacKenzie	1	0	1+0	0	0+0	0	0+0	0	0+0	0
31	FW	(England) ENG	Daniel Sullivan	0	0	0+0	0	0+0	0	0+0	0	0+0	0
32	DF	(England) ENG	Jake Hutchings	0	0	0+0	0	0+0	0	0+0	0	0+0	0
33	GK	(England) ENG	Conor Thompson	0	0	0+0	0	0+0	0	0+0	0	0+0	0

Source: Torquay United

=== Top scorers ===
Place	Position	Nation	Number	Name	League Two	FA Cup	League Cup	League Trophy	Total
1	FW	(England)	9	Rene Howe	16	0	0	0	16
2	FW	(England)	8	Ryan Jarvis	7	0	0	2	9
3	DF	(Australia)	4	Aaron Downes	5	0	0	0	5
=	FW	(England)	26	Elliot Benyon	5	0	0	0	5
4	FW	(Wales)	15	Billy Bodin	4	0	0	0	4
=	MF	(England)	24	Joss Labadie	4	0	0	0	4
5	MF	(England)	19	Danny Stevens	3	0	0	0	3
6	MF	(England)	7	Lee Mansell	2	0	0	0	2
7	MF	(Wales)	20	Nathan Craig	1	0	0	0	1
=	MF	(Republic of Ireland)	11	Ian Morris	1	0	0	0	1
=	DF	(England)	3	Kevin Nicholson	1	0	0	0	1
=	DF	(England)	2	Joe Oastler	1	0	0	0	1
=	DF	(England)	5	Brian Saah	1	0	0	0	1
=	FW	(England)	23	Ashley Yeoman	1	0	0	0	1
				Own goals	1	0	0	0	1
				Totals	53	0	0	2	55

Source: Torquay United

=== Disciplinary record ===
Number	Nation	Position	Name	League Two		FA Cup		League Cup		League Trophy		Total	
Number	Nation	Position	Name	Booked	Sent off (straight red)	Booked	Sent off (straight red)	Booked	Sent off (straight red)	Booked	Sent off (straight red)	Booked	Sent off (straight red)
9	(England)	FW	Rene Howe	15	0	0	0	0	0	0	0	15	0
2	(England)	DF	Joe Oastler	9	1	0	0	0	0	0	0	9	1
4	(Australia)	DF	Aaron Downes	5	1	0	0	0	0	0	0	5	1
7	(England)	MF	Lee Mansell	3	1	0	0	0	0	0	0	3	1
1	(England)	GK	Michael Poke	4	0	0	0	0	0	0	0	4	0
6	(England)	MF	Damon Lathrope	2	0	0	0	0	0	0	0	2	0
12	(England)	DF	Daniel Leadbitter	2	0	0	0	0	0	0	0	2	0
16	(England)	DF	Angus MacDonald	2	0	0	0	0	0	0	0	2	0
5	(England)	DF	Brian Saah	1	1	0	0	0	0	0	0	1	1
20	(Wales)	MF	Nathan Craig	1	0	0	0	0	0	0	0	1	0
18	(Scotland)	MF	Craig Easton	1	0	0	0	0	0	0	0	1	0
14	(England)	MF	Lloyd Macklin	1	0	0	0	0	0	0	0	1	0
29	(England)	MF	Niall Thompson	1	0	0	0	0	0	0	0	1	0
			Totals	39	4	0	0	0	0	0	0	39	4

Source: Torquay United

=== Transfers ===
==== In ====
Date	Nat.	Pos.	Name	From	Fee	References
5 July 2012	(Wales)	FW	Billy Bodin	Swindon Town	Undisclosed	
24 July 2012	(Australia)	DF	Aaron Downes	Unattached	Free	
28 August 2012	(England)	MF	Karl Baker	Unattached	Free	
10 September 2012	(England)	DF	George Artemi	Unattached	Free	
11 October 2012	(England)	GK	Conor Thompson	Chippenham Town	Free	

==== Loans in ====
Date	Nat.	Pos.	Name	From	Expiry date	References
22 November 2012	(England)	DF	Angus MacDonald	Reading	End of season	
11 February 2013	(England)	FW	Elliot Benyon	Southend United	End of season	
6 March 2013	(England)	MF	Joss Labadie	Notts County	End of season	
13 March 2013	(England)	MF	Jordan Chapell	Sheffield United	End of season	

==== Out ====
Date	Nat.	Pos.	Name	To	Fee	References
11 July 2012	(England)	MF	Chris McPhee	Released	Free	
26 July 2012	(Republic of Ireland)	MF	Eunan O'Kane	AFC Bournemouth	Undisclosed	
10 January 2013	(England)	DF	George Artemi	Released	n/a	
17 May 2013	(England)	ST	Ryan Jarvis	York City	Free	

==== Loans out ====
Date	Nat.	Pos.	Name	To	Expiry date	References
9 March 2013	(England)	MF	Karl Baker	Bideford	End of season	
9 March 2013	(England)	MF	Saul Halpin	Bideford	End of season	
9 March 2013	(England)	DF	Kyrtis MacKenzie	Taunton Town	End of season	
