= 1974 New York Cosmos season =

New York Cosmos
1974 season
- Manager: Gordon Bradley
- Stadium: Downing Stadium
- NASL: Division: 4th Overall: 13th Playoffs: Did not qualify
- National Challenge Cup: Did not enter
- Top goalscorer: League: Randy Horton (9 goals); All: Randy Horton (9 goals)
- Highest home attendance: 8,009 vs. PHI (June 9)
- Lowest home attendance: 1,153 vs. BOS (June 2)
- Average home league attendance: 3,578

The 1974 New York Cosmos season was the fourth season for the New York Cosmos in the now-defunct North American Soccer League. In the Cosmos' fourth year of existence the club finished last in the four-team Northern Division and 13th out of 15 in the overall league table, failing to qualify for the playoffs for the first time in their short history.

== Squad ==
Note: Flags indicate national team as defined under FIFA eligibility rules; some limited exceptions apply. Players may hold more than one non-FIFA nationality.

No.	Pos.	Nation	Player
0	GK	POL	Jerry Sularz
1	GK	USA	Shep Messing
2	DF	USA	Barry Mahy
3	DF	CAN	Frank Donlavey
4	DF	USA	Werner Roth
6	MF	CAN	John Kerr, Sr.
7	FW	ENG	Harold Jarman
10	MF	USA	Carlos Scott
11	FW	USA	Jorge Siega
12	FW	USA	Joey Fink
12	FW	BRA	Emanuel Carrette

No.	Pos.	Nation	Player
14	MF	ENG	Mike Wardrop
15	MF	HUN	Bela Monoki
16	FW	BER	Randy Horton
1	GK	ARG	Florial Rodriguez
20	MF	ECU	Germy Rivera
22	DF	USA	Angelo Anastasio
23	DF	USA	Len Renery
24	DF	USA	Gordon Bradley
6,8	DF	ENG	Malcolm Dawes
6,9	FW	USA	Mark Liveric

== Results ==
=== Regular season ===
Pld = Games Played, W = Wins, L = Losses, D = Draws, GF = Goals For, GA = Goals Against, Pts = Points
6 points for a win, 3 points for a draw, 0 points for a loss, 1 point for each goal scored (up to three per game).

==== Northern Division Standings ====
Pos	Club	Pld	W	L	D	GF	GA	GD	Pts
1	Boston Minutemen	20	10	9	1	36	23	+13	94
2	Toronto Metros	20	9	10	1	30	31	-1	87
3	Rochester Lancers	20	8	10	2	23	30	-7	77
4	New York Cosmos	20	4	14	2	28	40	-12	58

==== Overall League Placing ====
Pos	Club	Pld	W	L	D	GF	GA	GD	Pts
11	Washington Diplomats	20	7	12	1	29	36	-7	70
12	Vancouver Whitecaps	20	5	11	4	29	31	-2	70
13	New York Cosmos	20	4	14	2	28	40	-12	58
14	St. Louis Stars	20	4	15	1	27	42	-15	54
15	Denver Dynamos	20	5	15	0	21	42	21	49

==== Matches ====
Date	Opponent	Venue	Result	Attendance	Scorers
May 5, 1974	Baltimore Comets	H	2-3	5,700	Horton (2)
May 12, 1974	Miami Toros	H	1-1 (SOL)	1,428	Fink
May 19, 1974	Rochester Lancers	H	1-2	4,952	Dawes
May 22, 1974	Philadelphia Atoms	A	1-0	10,117	
June 2, 1974	Boston Minutemen	H	2-1	1,153	Horton, Vowden
June 9, 1974	Philadelphia Atoms	H	0-0 (SOW)	8,009	
June 14, 1974	Miami Toros	A	5-3	8,309	Jarman, Fink, Liveric
June 22, 1974	San Jose Earthquakes	A	2-2 (SOL)	15,445	Jarman (2)
June 23, 1974	Los Angeles Aztecs	A	3-2	4,107	Horton, Kerr
June 29, 1974	Boston Minutemen	A	3-0	10,849	
June 30, 1974	Vancouver Whitecaps	H	0-2	2,835	
July 4, 1974	Washington Diplomats	H	3-1	1,301	Horton (2), Scott
July 6, 1974	Denver Dynamos	A	2-0	3,915	
July 12, 1974	Baltimore Comets	A	2-2 (SOL)	3,467	Scott (2)
July 19, 1974	Rochester Lancers	A	1-0	9,255	
July 21, 1974	Seattle Sounders	H	2-1	4,326	Siega, Liveric
July 28, 1974	Toronto Metros	H	2-2 (SOW)	3,003	Jarman, Horton
July 31, 1974	Toronto Metros	A	1-1 (SOL)	2,226	Horton
August 4, 1974	St. Louis Stars	H	2-1	3,074	Fink, Dawes
August 11, 1974	Washington Diplomats	A	2-1	3,621	Horton

=== Friendlies ===
Date	Opponent	Venue	Result	Att.	Scorers	Ref.
May 26	(Italy) Napoli	H	2–2	9,752	Horton, Renery	
June 16	Universidad de Honduras	H	4–1	500	Horton, Dawes, Liveric, Rivera	
July 7	Puerto Rico	H	4–1	n/a	Liveric (3), Donlic	
July 14	(Italy) Italian Army team	H	1–3	500	Scott	

== See also ==
- 1974 North American Soccer League season
