= Niall Thompson =

Niall Thompson may refer to:

- Niall Thompson (soccer, born 1974), Canadian soccer player and coach
- Niall Thompson (footballer, born 1993), English footballer
