= Lineal championship =

Boxing championship

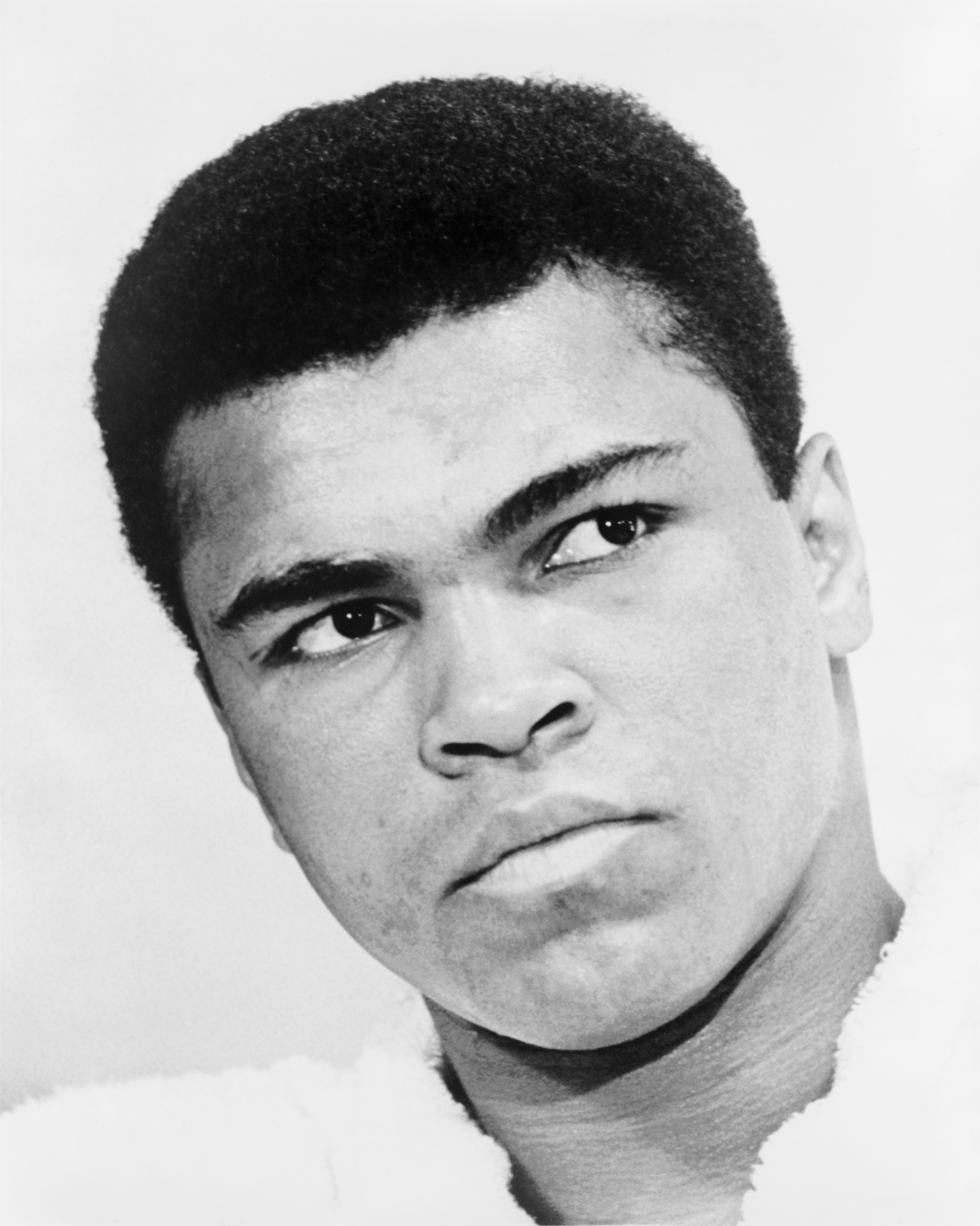
Muhammad Ali is the only three-time lineal heavyweight champion in the history of boxing

In combat sports where champions are determined by challenge, the lineal championship in a weight class represents an intangible world title first held by the victor of a bout between top contenders in the division. A fighter who defeats the reigning champion in a match within the same weight class becomes the next lineal champion. In professional boxing, the lineal champion is informally known as "the man who beat the man."

There is no universally accepted method for determining the beginning of each championship lineage, leading to the absence of a single canonical list of lineal champions. A lineage can be interrupted if the reigning champion retires or moves to a different weight class. Other circumstances, such as prolonged inactivity, legal problems, or a champion's inability to defend the title, may also lead to disruptions in the lineage. Additionally, when a sanctioning body such as the WBA, WBC, IBF, or WBO strips a title, this action is generally disregarded in determining the lineal champion.

== History ==
=== Boxing ===
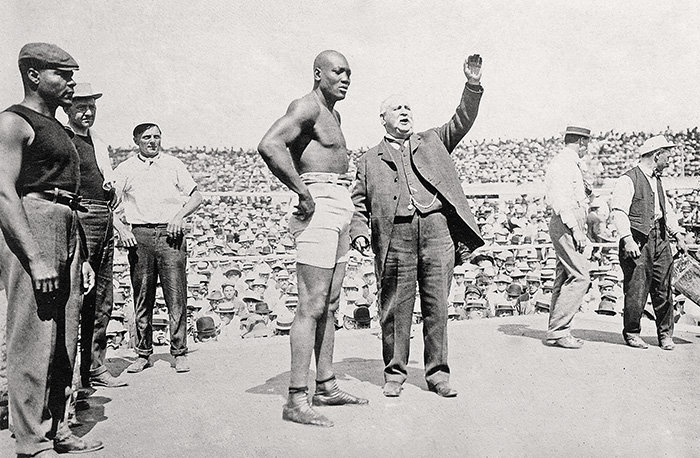
John L. Sullivan, the first lineal champion, came to welcome his successor, Jack Johnson. Ever since, it has been a tradition for champions of the past to attend title fights of recent champions, essentially to "pass the torch" and legitimize their reign.

The concept of a lineal champion was developed by boxing fans dissatisfied by the tendency of each of the various sanctioning bodies (WBC, WBA, IBF, WBO, etc.) to recognize different champions, and in particular to strip a champion of his title for refusing to fight its top-ranked contender. Prior to the 1970s, this rarely happened; the National Boxing Association (NBA) and the New York State Athletic Commission (NYSAC) sometimes recognized different champions, but there was usually only a short interval before one champion defeated the other. In that era, a title vacancy was generally filled by having a single-elimination tournament box-off between two or more top-ranked contenders. The lineal championship is intended as a return to that era.

Early boxing champions at various weight divisions were established by acclamation between 1880 and 1920. Once a consensus champion had been awarded the title, the championship could usually be taken only by beating the reigning holder, establishing a lineal championship.

Several top boxers have specified holding the lineal championship as a personal accomplishment (e.g. Lennox Lewis) or goal (e.g., Nate Campbell). Many boxing experts view the lineal championship as a prestigious status which trumps the world titles being issued by the sanctioning bodies (e.g. Steve Farhood).

=== Mixed martial arts ===
In mixed martial arts (MMA), the lineal championship is of particular relevance because until the mid-2000s, the top-ranked fighters were spread out among a number of mixed martial arts promotions across the globe. This included Japanese promotions such as Pride Fighting Championships, Pancrase, and Dream, as well as US-based promotions such as the Ultimate Fighting Championship (UFC), World Extreme Cage Fighting (WEC), and Strikeforce. The UFC eventually purchased most of the major promotions and, as a result, almost all of the lineal champions are currently signed with the promotion. The exception at this time is Francis Ngannou, who is signed with Most Valuable Promotions (MVP) following contract disputes with the UFC and his departure from the PFL.

== Issues ==
An issue in the implementation of a lineal championship is what to do if the lineal champion retires, dies, or moves to a different weight class. Different ways of resolving this vacancy mean the lineal championship may be subject to dispute. Since the modern lineal championship is a notional title tracked by fans, there is no money or organization to arrange a box-off to fill a vacant title, and there may not be consensus on who the top contenders are – this is true both for boxing and MMA. One example given by Cliff Rold, writing for Cyber Boxing Zone, is the light heavyweight title, considered vacant from the time Michael Spinks moved up to heavyweight in 1985 until 1996. While Rold considers WBA titlist Virgil Hill's defeat of IBF titlist Henry Maske in 1996 as the beginning of the next line of succession, others trace the title through Roy Jones Jr. after he had unified the WBA, WBC, and IBF titles in 1999. The Ring presented Jones with its inaugural light heavyweight belt in 2002 even though then WBO titlist Dariusz Michalczewski had defeated Hill for the WBA and IBF titles in 1997 and was stripped of them.

Another criticism of the lineal championship is that a fighter may defend it against inferior opponents. For example, George Foreman was considered lineal champion from 1994 until 1997, when Shannon Briggs beat him. After the WBA and IBF stripped him of their titles in 1995, Foreman fought only two, low-ranked opponents before Briggs. The lineal champion is not necessarily the boxer viewed as the best. Cyber Boxing Zone and BoxingScene considered Zsolt Erdei the lineal light-heavyweight champion from his 2004 defeat of Julio César González until 2009 when he vacated his title and moved up to cruiserweight. As he had not fought the highest-ranked opponents in the interim, Cliff Rold conceded, "while the concept of a champion needing to lose a title in the ring is solid, the practice is sometimes highly flawed".

In mixed martial arts, most controversy centers on the proper method for determining the first lineal MMA champion within each weight class. Early fights did not follow the currently agreed upon weight classes determined by the Unified Rules of Mixed Martial Arts, a rule set that was not finalized until the year 2000. For example: Some consider Mark Coleman's victory in 1997, when he became the first UFC Heavyweight champion, to be the beginning of the Heavyweight lineage. Others argue that Royce Gracie's victory at UFC 1 in 1993 is the true heavyweight starting point due to the Open-weight nature of the tournament. In this case, however, the lineal titles converge and unify with the current UFC Heavyweight title, so the champion remains the same regardless of which lineage one chooses to follow.

== Interpretations ==
=== The Ring ===
The boxing magazine The Ring has its own lineal championship. The original sequence was from its first publication in the 1920s until its hiatus in 1989, continuing as late as 1992 in some divisions. When it started awarding titles again in 2001, it did not calculate retrospective lineages to fill in the gap years, instead nominating a new champion. CBZ commented in 2004, "The Ring has forfeited its credibility by pulling names out of its ass to name fighters as champions". In 2007, The Ring was acquired by the owners of fight promoter Golden Boy Promotions, which has publicized The Ring's world championship when this is at stake in fights it promotes (such as Joe Calzaghe vs. Roy Jones, Jr. in 2008). Since 2012, to reduce the number of vacant titles, The Ring allows fights between a #1 or #2 contender and a #3, #4, or #5 contender to fill a vacant title. This has prompted further doubts about its credibility.

=== Cyber Boxing Zone defunct ===
The Cyber Boxing Zone (CBZ) website maintains lists of lineal champions, with input from boxing historian Tracy Callis of the International Boxing Research Organization. These were first published in 1994, and are retrospective to the introduction of Marquess of Queensberry Rules in 1885. The historical lists have sometimes been updated when new information about old fights comes to light. If its lineal champion at one weight class moves to another class, CBZ does not automatically vacate his title.

=== BoxingScene ===
BoxingScene.com disagrees with the lineages given by The Ring and by CBZ, especially in lower weight divisions with a higher rate of champions changing division. BoxingScene has traced its own most recent lineages, generally back to the 1990s.

=== Transnational Boxing Rankings Board ===
The Transnational Boxing Rankings Board (TBRB) was formed in October 2012 as a volunteer initiative to provide boxing with top-ten rankings, identify the singular world champion of every division, and to insist on the sport's reform. Board membership includes fifty boxing journalists and record keepers from around the world independent of sanctioning bodies and promoters. The board was formed to continue where The Ring "left off" in the aftermath of its purchase by Golden Boy Promotions in 2007 and the following dismissal of the editorial board headed by Nigel Collins.

After the new editors of The Ring announced a controversial new championship policy in May 2012, three prominent members of the Ring Advisory Panel resigned. These three members (Springs Toledo, Cliff Rold and Tim Starks) became the founding members of the Transnational Boxing Rankings Board, which was formed over the summer of 2012 with the assistance of Stewart Howe of England. The board only awards vacant championships when the two top-ranked fighters in any division meet.

=== Sports Illustrated ===
SI.com published galleries of lineal heavyweight and middleweight champions.

=== Lineal Boxing Champion defunct ===
Since April 6, 2019, LinealBoxingChampion.com (LBC) has been producing monthly, non-computerized divisional rankings for women's professional boxing. The rankings are compiled by an international team of ten boxing experts, which includes site editor and member of the International Boxing Research Organization, Adam McMeeking (from the UK), International Women's Boxing Hall of Fame 2019 inductee, David Avila (from the US), Max Boxing journalist and former Boxing Monthly contributor, Anthony Cocks (from Australia) and Ring Magazine contributor, Yuriko Miyata (from Japan). In keeping with the tradition, the lineal champion status is awarded to the winner of a fight between the number one and number two ranked contenders. Due to its limited number of competitors, LBC does not recognize the bridgerweight division. LBC also keeps a record of the lineal champions in men's boxing, across all 17 weight classes, from the 1880s to present.

== Records ==
- Muhammad Ali is the only three-time lineal heavyweight boxing champion. He beat Sonny Liston in 1964, George Foreman in 1974, and Leon Spinks in 1978.
- Manny Pacquiao is the first professional boxer in history to win the lineal world championship in four different weight categories. (flyweight, featherweight, super-featherweight, and light-welterweight). Pacquiao also won the TBRB and The Cyber Boxing Zone welterweight title in 2016, however, he did not gain international consensus as the true lineal welterweight champion of the division, as at the time of Pacquiao/Bradley 3, many (including Ring Magazine) considered Kell Brook to be the best welterweight in the world. Boxing Monthly had Tim Bradley ranked at #3 and The Ring had Bradley at #4. No major sanctioning body titles were on the line for Pacquiao/Bradley 3, and neither was The Ring title.
  - Floyd Mayweather Jr. matched Manny Pacquiao, by winning lineal championships in four weight classes (super featherweight, lightweight, welterweight, and light middleweight).
  - Terence Crawford matched Mayweather and Pacquiao by winning lineal championships in four weight classes (lightweight, light welterweight, welterweight, super middleweight). He is also the only boxer to hold The Ring magazine title in four different divisions.
- Peter Aerts is the only five-time lineal heavyweight kickboxing champion. He beat Patrick Smith in 1994, Andy Hug in 1997, Ernesto Hoost in 1998, Andy Hug in 1998, and Semmy Schilt in 2010.
- Fedor Emelianenko, heavyweight mixed martial artist, held the lineal title for longer than any fighter in history. Fedor won the title from Antônio Rodrigo Nogueira in 2003 and defended it 18 times before eventually losing it to Fabricio Werdum in 2010.
- Claressa Shields, Jessica McCaskill, and Katie Taylor are the only women to be recognized as two-weight lineal champions.

== See also ==
- List of current world boxing champions
