= BoxRec =

Website providing records of professional boxers

- Website type: Boxing, sports
- Owner: John Sheppard
- Creator: John Sheppard
- Website: boxrec.com
- Commercial: Yes
- Registration: Required
- Launched: 2000
- Current status: Active

BoxRec or boxrec.com is a website based in Doncaster, England, which compiles updated records of professional and amateur boxers, both male and female. It also maintains a MediaWiki-based encyclopedia of boxing.

Sheppard claims, "the objective of the site is to document every professional boxer and boxing match from the instigation of the Queensberry Rules up to the present times." Sheppard and his selected volunteer editors publish ratings for all active boxers and all-time ratings. Since 2012, the site has hosted Barry Hugman's History of World Championship Boxing.

== Foundation ==
The site was founded by John Sheppard, an Englishman. Sheppard had never attended a boxing bout until 1995 when he attended a "Prince" Naseem Hamed fight with Hamed's older brothers Riath and Nabeel. Sheppard had considered boxing to be a "barbaric and degrading" spectacle, stating "I sat there watching people punch each other in the head, wondering why they were doing it... I was sprayed with blood, getting more and more miserable." However, Sheppard later explained, "[D]uring Naseem's fight, something clicked in my head. The subtlety of what he was doing, the genius of it all, became obvious to me. It wasn't a disgusting spectacle anymore. It was art, and I found myself cheering."

Following Hamed's split with Frank Warren, Sheppard went to work for Hamed at "Prince Promotions" in 2000. Sheppard then began to compile record of active British boxers in an attempt to aid matchmaking of boxers and then decided to create a website which would store the records of all boxers. The site has grown so much that Sheppard has gone full-time since 2005. As of December 2008, on a typical day 50,000 visitors could view 700,000 pages with the record of 1,300,000 bouts in its database encompassing 17,000 active and 345,000 non-active fighters.

== Organization ==
The website is updated by volunteer editors from many countries around the world. Each editor is assigned a country or in some instances, regions within countries and they maintain the records for boxers in that country or region. BoxRec also rates each active fighter by weight division.

== Criticism of the website ==
BoxRec has been criticized for not keeping correct records for boxers, especially historical fighters. In 2005, BoxRec applied to become recognized as the official record keepers for the Association of Boxing Commissions (ABC). The ABC held interviews with both Fight Fax and BoxRec at their 2005 convention. Each applicant made a submission and presentation to the ABC panel which included state commissioners and attorneys. The panel then voted unanimously in favour to award Fight Fax the position. The ABC later revealed that they had performed tests to measure the accuracy of each company's records: Fight Fax's records were shown to be 100% accurate, while the accuracy of BoxRec's records was found to be "substantially lower". Nonetheless, in 2016 the ABC voted to recognize Boxrec as an official record-keeper alongside Fight Fax.

Boxing promoter J. Russell Peltz stated "very few things in life are one hundred percent. But I've come across some glaring errors at BoxRec, mostly in the historical records." ESPN's Dan Rafael noted that "so many people have a hand in BoxRec that the records aren't always accurate. Ricardo Mayorga's record has been wrong for years. There's a mistake [in] Derrick Gainer's record too."

== Plaudits from boxing personalities ==
When asked how important BoxRec was to him, boxing promoter Lou DiBella stated that "anyone in boxing who says he doesn't use BoxRec is either a complete imbecile or lying" and Bruce Trampler, the matchmaker for Top Rank, said that "short of actually being at a fight, they're the best source of information out there."

Boxing journalist Thomas Hauser also asked the chairman of the New York State Athletic Commission Ron Scott Stevens what his thoughts were, and Stevens was quoted as saying "Fight Fax is the mandated record-keeper for athletic commissions in the United States. But BoxRec does more than supplement Fight Fax. In many respects, it surpasses Fight Fax."

David Haye, when commenting on what was then his only professional loss at the time, stated

I'd love to get revenge over Carl Thompson, I know I have improved and made the adjustments required, but still, I take a look at my record at BoxRec and I see this red blob there, that one loss there really does stick out at me.

== WBA ==
Boxrec announced that, as of August, 2024, the webpage no longer recognizes World Boxing Association world championship fights as being for world titles and WBA world champions as having been world champions, at least as far as their WBA championships are concerned.

== BBBofC/EBU Title Bout Icon Removed ==
In 2024, Sheppard decided to remove the title bout icon for the 1950 BBBofC/EBU World Heavyweight Championship between Bruce Woodcock and Lee Savold.
