= Angus MacDonald (footballer) =

English footballer

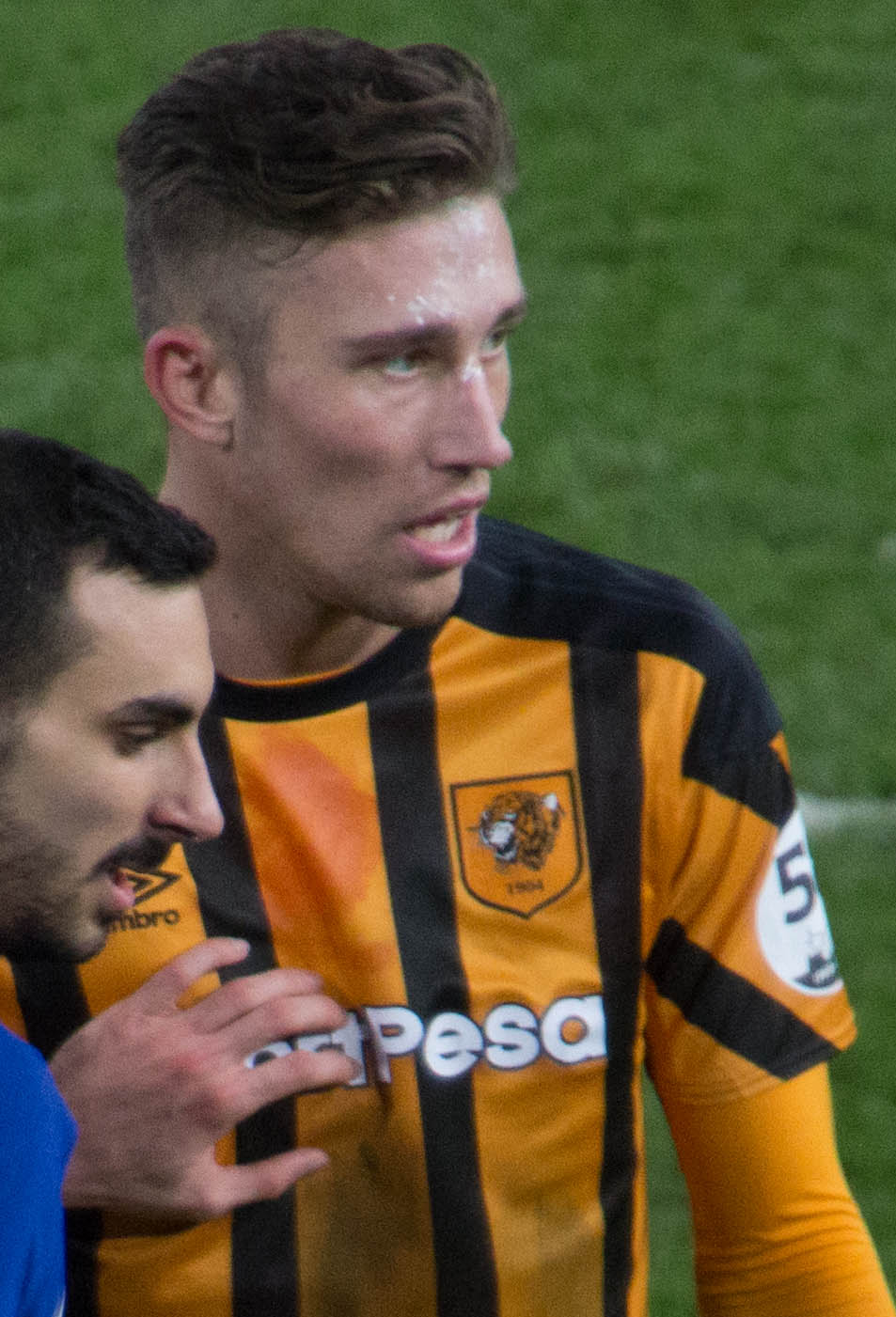
- MacDonald playing for Hull City in 2018

Personal information
- Full name: Angus Lees MacDonald
- Date of birth: 15 October 1992 (age 34)
- Place of birth: Winchester, England
- Height: 6 ft 1 in (1.85 m)
- Position: Defender

Team information
- Current team: Barrow
- Number: 2

Youth career
- 2007–2011: Reading

Senior career*
Years	Team	Apps	(Gls)
2011–2013	Reading	0	(0)
2011	→ Salisbury City (loan)	4	(0)
2011–2012	→ Basingstoke Town (loan)	8	(1)
2012	→ Torquay United (loan)	3	(0)
2012	→ AFC Wimbledon (loan)	4	(0)
2012–2013	→ Torquay United (loan)	14	(0)
2013–2014	Salisbury City	29	(2)
2014–2016	Torquay United	67	(3)
2016–2018	Barnsley	50	(1)
2018–2020	Hull City	18	(0)
2020–2022	Rotherham United	46	(1)
2022–2023	Swindon Town	16	(0)
2023–2025	Aberdeen	40	(0)
2025	Exeter City	15	(1)
2026–	Barrow	0	(0)

International career
2007–2008	England U16	6	(0)
2010	England U19	4	(0)
2013–2014	England C	2	(0)
- * Club domestic league appearances and goals as of 11:31, 2 July 2025 (UTC)

Angus Lees MacDonald (born 15 October 1992) is an English professional footballer who plays as a defender for Barrow on loan.

A product of the Reading academy, MacDonald has made over 350 career appearances across England and Scotland and also represented England at youth international level.

== Career ==
MacDonald was born in Winchester, Hampshire. He started his career in the Academy at Reading and spent time on loan at Salisbury City during his scholarship before signing his first professional contract in June 2011. In November 2011, MacDonald joined Conference South club Basingstoke Town on loan, making his debut in a 2–1 FA Trophy win over Sutton United. He joined League Two side Torquay United on loan until the end of the season in February 2012. He made his professional debut for the Gulls in a 1–0 win over Crawley Town. On 30 July 2012, MacDonald joined AFC Wimbledon on a six-month loan deal. However, he was subsequently recalled by Reading on 28 September 2012.

On 22 November, MacDonald rejoined Torquay United on loan for six weeks as defensive cover. He made his return to the team as a first-half substitute in the 1–0 defeat to Bradford City on 8 December. On 8 January 2013, MacDonald had his loan extended until the end of the season. Torquay manager Martin Ling described the loan as effectively a trial for MacDonald, with the possibility of a permanent transfer in the summer when his Reading contract expired.

MacDonald was released by Reading on 24 May 2013 after the club confirmed that his contract would not be renewed. He did not win a call into a first team squad while with Reading. Following his release he had trials with Yeovil Town, Birmingham City and Leicester City, but he did not join any of the clubs on a permanent basis.

On 23 August 2013, he joined Salisbury City on a one-year contract. He made his debut three weeks later as a late substitute against Chester but was sent off within minutes for violent conduct. The following month he scored his first goal for the club with an overhead kick, earning Salisbury a 2–1 win over Wrexham.

MacDonald signed for newly relegated Conference Premier club Torquay United on a one-year contract on 21 July 2014. He made 33 appearances, scoring one goal in his first, permanent season at the club and earned a further year contract extension. MacDonald made 48 appearances scoring twice, in a season where he was named club captain under player-manager Kevin Nicholson.

On 2 August 2016, MacDonald signed for Championship club Barnsley. He scored his first goal for the club in an FA Cup tie against Blackpool on 17 January 2017. Barnsley announced on 3 August 2017 that MacDonald would be the new first team captain.

On 31 January 2018, he signed a two-and-a-half-year deal with Hull City for an undisclosed fee. In 2021, Barnsley had to pay Hull £1 million compensation as they had failed to disclose MacDonald's medical history, with Hull stating they would not have signed him if they knew of it.

Following the end of his Hull City contract, MacDonald signed a two-year deal with Championship club Rotherham United on 15 August 2020. Macdonald left the club at the end of his contract following promotion in the 2021–22 season.

In July 2022, he signed a two-year contract with Swindon Town.

In January 2023, Angus signed a short-term permanent deal with Scottish Premiership club Aberdeen following his release from Swindon Town, where he signed an extension following the end of his deal, staying on until February 2025, when on deadline day it was announced by the club that he had left, becoming a free agent.

On 3 February 2025, MacDonald joined League One club Exeter City on a short-term deal until the end of the season. He departed the club upon the expiry of his contract.

On 5 March 2026, MacDonald joined League Two side Barrow on a deal until the end of the season. On 2 May 2026, following a 1–2 defeat to Newport County, Barrow were relegated from League Two, returning to the National League after six seasons in the EFL.

== Personal life ==
MacDonald is of Scottish descent through his grandfather.

MacDonald was diagnosed with early stages of bowel cancer on 4 September 2019. On 19 December 2019, he announced that he had been given the all-clear.

In 2019, MacDonald was in a relationship with singer Alexandra Burke. It was reported that the couple separated in October 2020.

== Career statistics ==
As of end of 2024–25 season

Appearances and goals by club, season, and competition
Club	Season	League			National Cup		League Cup		Other		Total	
Club	Season	Division	Apps	Goals	Apps	Goals	Apps	Goals	Apps	Goals	Apps	Goals
Salisbury City (loan)	2010–11	Southern League Premier Division	4	0	0	0	—		1 (Note: Appearance in Southern League Premier Division play-offs)	0	5	0
Basingstoke Town (loan)	2011–12	Conference South	8	1	0	0	—		3 (Note: Appearances in FA Trophy)	0	11	1
Torquay United (loan)	2011–12	League Two	3	0	—		—		—		3	0
AFC Wimbledon (loan)	2012–13	League Two	4	0	0	0	1	0	1 (Note: Appearance in Football League / EFL Trophy)	0	6	0
Torquay United (loan)	2012–13	League Two	14	0	—		—		—		14	0
Salisbury City	2013–14	Conference Premier	29	2	3	0	—		1	0	33	2
Salisbury City	Total		33	2	3	0	—		2	0	38	2
Torquay United	2014–15	Conference Premier	26	1	1	0	—		6	0	33	1
Torquay United	2015–16	National League	41	2	1	0	—		6	0	48	2
Torquay United	Total		84	3	2	0	—		12	0	98	3
Barnsley	2016–17	Championship	39	1	2	1	0	0	—		41	2
Barnsley	2017–18	Championship	11	0	—		2	0	—		13	0
Barnsley	Total		50	1	2	1	2	0	—		54	2
Hull City	2017–18	Championship	12	0	1	0	—		—		13	0
Hull City	2018–19	Championship	1	0	0	0	2	0	—		3	0
Hull City	2019–20	Championship	5	0	0	0	0	0	—		5	0
Hull City	Total		18	0	1	0	2	0	—		21	0
Rotherham United	2020–21	Championship	39	1	1	0	0	0	—		40	1
Rotherham United	2021–22	League One	7	0	0	0	0	0	1	0	8	0
Rotherham United	Total		46	1	1	0	0	0	1	0	48	1
Swindon Town	2022–23	League Two	16	0	0	0	0	0	—		16	0
Aberdeen	2022–23	Scottish Premiership	15	0	0	0	0	0	—		15	0
Aberdeen	2023–24	Scottish Premiership	20	0	3	1	1	0	3	1	27	2
Aberdeen	2024–25	Scottish Premiership	5	0	0	0	2	0	0	0	7	0
Aberdeen	Total		40	0	3	1	3	0	3	1	49	2
Exeter City	2024-25	League One	15	1	1	0	—		—		16	1
Career total			314	9	13	2	8	0	22	1	357	12
