= Portway Bristol =

Portway Bristol could refer to:

- Portway Bristol F.C., a former football club based in Bristol
- Portway, Bristol a road in the City of Bristol that follows the River Avon
