= Thomas Cruise =

English footballer (born 1991)

Personal information
- Full name: Thomas Daniel Cruise
- Date of birth: 9 March 1991 (age 35)
- Place of birth: Islington, England
- Height: 6 ft 0 in (1.83 m)
- Position: Left back

Youth career
- 2007–2009: Arsenal

Senior career*
Years	Team	Apps	(Gls)
2009–2011	Arsenal	1	(0)
2010–2011	→ Carlisle United (loan)	3	(0)
2012–2015	Torquay United	61	(0)

International career
2006–2007	England U16	8	(0)
2007	England U17	2	(0)
2010	England U19	6	(1)
- * Club domestic league appearances and goals

Thomas Daniel Cruise (born 9 March 1991) is an English former professional footballer who played as a left back. He has played in the Football League for Carlisle United and Torquay United. He is a product of the Arsenal Academy which came to prominence during the 2008–09 FA Youth Cup.

== Club career ==
Cruise was born in Islington, Greater London. He joined in and made his debut for Arsenal F.C. Reserves in November 2007. Through Arsenal Academy, Cruise was a member of the FA Youth Cup winning team in 2008–09. On 9 December 2009, with Arsenal having qualified for the knockout stage of the 2009–10 UEFA Champions League as winners of Group H, manager Arsène Wenger played a number of youth players in the final group match against Olympiacos. Cruise started the match, giving him his first and only senior appearance for the club, playing the whole game. On 3 November 2010, he joined League One club Carlisle United on loan. On 17 June 2011, Arsenal's website announced; "Arsenal Football Club can confirm that Mark Randall, Thomas Cruise and Roarie Deacon will reach the end of their contracts with the Club this month to become free agents."

Following his release from Arsenal, Cruise had a trial with Serie B side Sampdoria. Cruise also had a trial at League One side Scunthorpe United in late 2011. On 20 February 2012, Major League Soccer (MLS) side New England Revolution claimed Cruise was training at the club for a two-week trial with a move to the New England Revolution. In June 2012, he signed a one-year deal with Torquay United. On 24 May 2013, he signed a new one-year deal with Torquay. It was announced in April 2015, that Cruise and a number of other players would be released from the club.

In 2016, he began training to become an accountant.

== International career ==
In 2007, he was called up to the England under-17 team. In October 2007, Cruise took part in the first round of qualifying for 2008 UEFA European Under-17 Championship, however he was replaced for the second round of qualifying in March 2008 due to an injury.

He was part of England U19 squad that reached the semi-finals of 2010 UEFA European Under-19 Championship and subsequently qualified for 2011 FIFA U-20 World Cup in Colombia as a result of finishing at least third in the group stages.

== Career statistics ==
As of 22 May 2015

Club	Season	League		FA Cup		League Cup		Europe		Other		Total	
Club	Season	Apps	Goals	Apps	Goals	Apps	Goals	Apps	Goals	Apps	Goals	Apps	Goals
Arsenal	2009–10	0	0	0	0	0	0	1	0	0	0	1	0
Carlisle United (loan)	2010–11	3	0	3	0	0	0	0	0	2	0	8	0
Torquay United	2012–13	16	0	0	0	1	0	0	0	1	0	18	0
Torquay United	2013–14	21	0	0	0	0	0	0	0	1	0	22	0
Torquay United	2014–15	24	0	0	0	0	0	0	0	0	0	24	0
Career total		64	0	3	0	1	0	1	0	4	0	73	0
