= Tracy Callis =

American journalist

- Born: Roanoke, Virginia, USA
- Education: Virginia Tech; Virginia Western Community College
- Occupations: Boxing historian, sports writer, journalist
- Years active: 1960s – Present
- Spouse: Barbara Callis
- Children: 3
- Website: ibroresearch.com

Tracy Callis is an American boxing historian, writer and journalist. He is the director of the historical research boxing website Cyber Boxing Zone (CBZ) and International Boxing Research Organization (IBRO). He is also an elector to the International Boxing Hall Of Fame (IBHoF) and a member of the World Boxing Historians Association (WBHA).

== Education ==
In 1963, Callis earned a master's degree in mathematics at Virginia Tech and worked at NASA's Langley Research Center as a mathematician for three years and later as a computer systems engineer for five years with IBM Corporation. He retired after serving thirty two years as a professor of information technology at Virginia Western Community College.

== Career ==
Callis became interested in boxing and began profiling many boxers particularly the pre-1900 fighters. He is recognized as one of the leading experts on 19th-century fighters including those who fought in the bare-knuckles era. Callis is a member of the International Boxing Research Organization (IBRO) and has provided historical data to many well-known boxing historians, journalists and editors such as Herb Goldman of The Ring magazine, Mike DeLisa and Dan Cuoco of Cyber Boxing Zone, Bert Sugar, Hank Kaplan and British Boxing Board of Control (BBBoC) writer Barry Hugman.

Callis has been a boxing historian for more than 45 years researching boxing's history. Among the research he discovered as an IBRO member are: 4 additional knockout wins for Archie Moore (increased his KO record to 132), an additional 13 fights for Mickey Walker and 23 knockout wins for Jimmy Wilde.

Callis is the author of the book A Brief History of the Heavyweights and the co-author of Boxing in the Los Angeles Area: 1880-2005, Philadelphia's Boxing Heritage: 1876-1976 and More tales from Ringside. He has also written reviews on boxing books, including A Man Among Men, Bareknuckles, Blood and Broken Bones, Famous Pugilists of the English Prize Ring 1719-1870, The First Black Boxing Champions, Uncrowned Champions and John L. Sullivan: The Career of the First Gloved Heavyweight Champion.
