= 1973–74 Newport County A.F.C. season =

Welsh association football club season

Newport County
1973–74 season
- Manager: Billy Lucas (until January 1974); Brian Harris (from January 1974)
- Stadium: Somerton Park
- Fourth Division: 9th
- FA Cup: First round
- League Cup: First round
- Top goalscorer: League: W.Brown (9); All: H.J.Jarman (11)
- Highest home attendance: 6,007 vs Swindon Town (League Cup, 4 September 1973)
- Lowest home attendance: 1,785 vs Hartlepool (6 April 1974)
- Average home league attendance: 3,018
Home colours	Away colours

The 1973–74 season was Newport County's 12th consecutive season in the Football League Fourth Division since relegation at the end of the 1961–62 season and their 46th overall in the Football League.

== Season review ==
=== Results summary ===
Overall								Home						Away					
Pld	W	D	L	GF	GA	GAv	Pts	W	D	L	GF	GA	Pts	W	D	L	GF	GA	Pts
46	16	14	16	56	65	0.862	46	13	6	4	39	23	32	3	8	12	17	42	14

Source: rsssf.com

=== Results by round ===
Round	1	2	3	4	5	6	7	8	9	10	11	12	13	14	15	16	17	18	19	20	21	22	23	24	25	26	27	28	29	30	31	32	33	34	35	36	37	38	39	40	41	42	43	44	45	46
Ground	H	A	H	A	A	H	H	A	A	H	A	A	H	H	A	H	A	H	H	A	A	H	A	A	H	A	H	A	H	H	A	H	A	H	A	H	A	H	H	A	H	A	A	H	H	A
Result	D	D	L	L	L	W	W	D	L	W	D	D	W	L	L	W	W	W	W	W	L	W	D	L	D	L	L	D	W	D	D	W	L	D	L	W	L	W	L	L	D	W	D	W	D	L
Position	9	10	21	21	24	18	16	11	19	15	15	14	12	14	14	14	12	10	9	6	7	5	5	5	6	8	10	9	9	9	9	7	10	7	9	8	9	8	15	15	14	14	13	9	9	9

Updated to match(es) played on 27 Apr 1974. Source: statto.com
A = Away; H = Home; W = Win; D = Draw; L = Loss

== Fixtures and results ==
=== Fourth Division ===
Date	Opponents	Venue	Result	Scorers	Attendance
25 Aug 1973	Reading	H	0–0		4,843
1 Sep 1973	Gillingham	A	1–1	Screen	3,971
8 Sep 1973	Chester	H	0–2		3,660
11 Sep 1973	Northampton Town	A	0–1		4,061
15 Sep 1973	Colchester United	A	1–4	Hill	3,523
18 Sep 1973	Crewe Alexandra	H	4–2	Aizlewood 2, Jarman 2	2,035
22 Sep 1973	Rotherham United	H	1–0	R.Jones	3,138
28 Sep 1973	Stockport County	A	1–1	Brown	2,780
3 Oct 1973	Crewe Alexandra	A	1–4	Jarman	1,879
9 Oct 1973	Mansfield Town	H	2–0	Brown, R.Jones	3,004
13 Oct 1973	Scunthorpe United	A	0–0		2,607
20 Oct 1973	Barnsley	A	1–1	Brown	2,057
23 Oct 1973	Northampton Town	H	3–1	R.Jones, Aizelwood, Jarman	3,592
27 Oct 1973	Peterborough United	H	0–1		4,327
3 Nov 1973	Lincoln City	A	0–3		4,389
9 Nov 1973	Doncaster Rovers	H	3–1	R.Jones, Godfrey, Summerhayes	2,852
12 Nov 1973	Hartlepool	A	1–0	Aizelwood	1,641
17 Nov 1973	Darlington	H	2–0	Aizelwood, Godfrey	2,910
1 Dec 1973	Bury	H	1–0	Hill	2,346
8 Dec 1973	Exeter City	A	1–0	Godfrey	3,476
15 Dec 1973	Torquay United	A	2–3	Aizewood, Jarman	2,505
22 Dec 1973	Stockport County	H	3–1	Hooper, R.Jones, Brown	2,546
26 Dec 1973	Brentford	A	1–1	Hill	5,440
29 Dec 1973	Chester	A	0–3		2,661
1 Jan 1974	Gillingham	H	3–3	Brown, Hill, Summerhayes	5,888
5 Jan 1974	Workington	A	2–3	Hooper, Brown	749
12 Jan 1974	Colchester United	H	1–3	Hooper	3,304
19 Jan 1974	Reading	A	1–1	R.Jones	4,311
27 Jan 1974	Exeter City	H	2–1	Screen, Brown	3,812
3 Feb 1974	Torquay United	H	2–2	Aizelwood, Godfrey	3,480
10 Feb 1974	Rotherham United	A	1–1	OG	2.933
17 Feb 1974	Scunthorpe United	H	2–1	Hooper 2	3,051
24 Feb 1974	Mansfield Town	A	1–2	Jarman	3,006
2 Mar 1974	Brentford	H	1–1	D.Jones	2,167
9 Mar 1974	Peterborough United	A	0–2		7,354
17 Mar 1974	Barnsley	H	1–0	Jenkins	1,808
22 Mar 1974	Doncaster Rovers	A	0–2		1,163
25 Mar 1974	Workington	H	4–0	Godfrey 3, Coldrick	1,972
30 Mar 1974	Lincoln City	H	0–1		1,908
3 Apr 1974	Bradford City	A	0–3		2,681
6 Apr 1974	Hartlepool	H	0–0		1,785
13 Apr 1974	Darlington	A	1–0	Hooper	2,322
15 Apr 1974	Swansea City	A	1–1	White	2,303
16 Apr 1974	Swansea City	H	2–1	Brown, Jarman	3,108
22 Apr 1974	Bradford City	H	2–2	Jarman, Brown	1,890
27 Apr 1974	Bury	A	0–5		6,111

=== FA Cup ===
Round	Date	Opponents	Venue	Result	Scorers	Attendance
1	24 Nov 1973	Wycombe Wanderers	A	1–3	Hooper	6,888

=== Football League Cup ===
Round	Date	Opponents	Venue	Result	Scorers	Attendance
1	28 Aug 1973	Swindon Town	A	3–3	Jarman, Screen, Brown	6,873
1r	4 Sep 1973	Swindon Town	H	1–2	Jarman	6,007

== League table ==
Pos	Team	Pld	W	D	L	GF	GA	GAv	Pts
7	Chester	46	17	15	14	54	55	0.982	49
8	Bradford City	46	17	14	15	58	52	1.115	48
9	Newport County	46	16	14	16	56	65	0.862	45 (Note: Newport County had one point deducted for fielding an ineligible player.)
10	Exeter City	45	18	8	19	58	55	1.055	44 (Note: Scunthorpe United v. Exeter was never played; Exeter failed to turn up and Scunthorpe were awarded the points.)
11	Hartlepool	46	16	12	18	48	47	1.021	44

Source: rsssf.com
