= Nathan Craig =

Welsh footballer

Personal information
- Full name: Nathan Lee Craig
- Date of birth: 25 October 1991 (age 35)
- Place of birth: Caernarfon, Wales
- Height: 6 ft 0 in (1.83 m)
- Position: Midfielder

Youth career
- 2009–2010: Everton

Senior career*
Years	Team	Apps	(Gls)
2010–2011	Everton	0	(0)
2011–2012	Caernarfon Town	17	(5)
2012–2014	Torquay United	47	(1)
2014	→ Dorchester Town (loan)	6	(1)
2014–2020	Caernarfon Town	200	(82)
2020	Flint Town United	10	(1)
2021	Caernarfon Town	1	(0)
2021–2022	Porthmadog	9	(3)
2026–	Mountain Rangers		
Total		290	(93)

International career
2007–2008	Wales U17	11	(2)
2008–2009	Wales U19	9	(1)
2009	Wales U21	4	(0)
- * Club domestic league appearances and goals

Nathan Lee Craig (born 25 October 1991) is a Welsh footballer who currently plays for Mountain Rangers.

He has previously played for Premier League team Everton, Torquay United and his home town club, Caernarfon Town. He is also a Wales under-21 international. Craig is a left-footed midfielder who can play in both central or wide roles.

== Club career ==
=== Everton ===
Craig joined Everton at the age of 12 and, having progressed through the youth team ranks, he was offered a place as a first-year scholar in the summer of 2008. A deadball specialist, he became a regular in the Under-18s during the 2008/09 season. His versatility down the left flank and set-piece delivery saw him progress to Everton's reserves in the 2009/2010 and he became a regular for the reserves during the 2010/2011 season. He made his competitive first-team debut versus BATE Borisov on 17 December 2009 in the UEFA Europa League.

=== Caernarfon Town ===
After being released by Everton in the summer of 2011, he joined up with home town club Caernarfon Town.

=== Torquay United ===
Craig Joined Torquay United after a successful trial in 2012 and went on to make 47 appearances, scoring 1 goal a freekick. Following the club's relegation to the Conference in May 2014 Craig, along with 7 other teammates, was placed on the transfer list. On 7 June 2014 following the player's request, his contract was mutually terminated.

=== Caernarfon Town ===
Recently he was reunited with his hometown club after leaving Torquay United. Craig has scored 14 goals in the first 18 games of the 16/17 season. This was followed by an excellent return of 21 goals in 26 games so far in 2017/2018. Craig scored 13 league goals as Caernarfon returned to the Welsh premier league in 18/19, with the team finishing an impressive 4th and qualifying for the Europa league play off.

On 22 June 2020, the club announced on Twitter that Craig had departed the club, for a "new challenge", later revealed to be Flint Town United. He left Flint in December 2020 due to work commitments.

Craig briefly returned to Caernarfon before moving to Porthmadog. He scored twice on his debut in a 9–0 Welsh Cup win against Mountain Rangers.

His final appearance for Porthmadog was in October 2021. He announced his retirement in April 2022, citing injuries as the reason.

=== Mountain Rangers ===
In January 2026 he returned to football as a player-coach for Welsh fifth tier side Mountain Rangers. On 18 April 2026 he played in the NWCFA Junior Cup final against Llandyrnog United, which they won 2–1 after he assisted the winning goal from a corner.

== International career ==
Craig made a goalscoring debut for the Wales under-17 side on 27 August 2007 during a 2–1 victory over Belgium after replacing Matthew Hurdman as a first-half substitute. Two months after making his debut, Craig was included in the squad for the qualifying round of the 2008 UEFA European Under-17 Championship, making appearances in matches against Spain and Andorra. Having advanced to the elite round of qualifying, Craig played in all three group matches as Wales finished second in their group, failing to qualify for the tournament.

He made his debut for the Wales under-21 side against Bosnia and Herzegovina in October 2009.

== Personal life ==
Craig was born in the town of Caernarfon in Wales and speaks fluent Welsh and English.
