= Doug Hillard =

English footballer

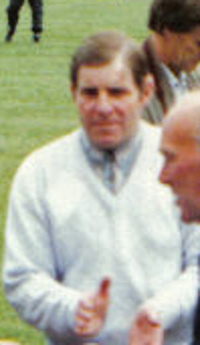
- Doug Hillard in August 1988, aged 53

Personal information
- Full name: Douglas Alfred Hillard
- Date of birth: 10 August 1935
- Place of birth: Bristol, England
- Date of death: January 1997 (aged 61)
- Place of death: Bristol, England
- Position: Full-back

Senior career*
Years	Team	Apps	(Gls)
1957–1968	Bristol Rovers	318	(12)
1968–1973	Taunton Town	?	(?)

Managerial career
- 1968–1973: Taunton Town
- 1973–1978: Mangotsfield United
- * Club domestic league appearances and goals

Douglas Alfred Hillard (10 August 1935 – 1997) was an English professional footballer who played over 300 games in an eleven-year period for Bristol Rovers, his only Football League club.

== Footballing career ==
Prior to joining the Pirates Hillard had played as an amateur for Maywood, for whom he once scored eight goals in a 15–0 victory over Lockleaze Rovers Juniors in 1952, and Bristol Mental Hospital.

Hillard joined Bristol Rovers in 1957, and enjoyed a long career with them, spending a total of eleven years at the club. His 318 league appearances put him 19th on the list of Rovers players with the most appearances, and he is one of only twenty men to have played over 300 games for them.

After leaving Bristol Rovers in 1968 Hillard joined Taunton Town as player-manager and found immediate success with the Somerset club, winning the team's first ever Western League title in his first year in charge. He remained in charge of Taunton for five seasons before being appointed manager of Mangotsfield United in 1973, a position he held for many years.

== Personal life ==
Hillard was born in Bristol in 1935 and was the son of Douglas E. Hillard, who was a painter and decorator, and Doris Amy Bamford. He had a younger brother, John, who was eight years his junior.

Before retiring from playing football Hillard opened a shop selling sporting goods, Doug Hillard Sports, which was originally located on Stapleton Road, near Rovers' Eastville Stadium, but later moved to the Fishponds area of Bristol. The shop is managed by Doug's son Gary Hillard.

Doug died in January 1997 and was survived by his wife Janet and son Gary. In September 2014 he was posthumously awarded the Harry Bamford trophy, which is presented to Bristol sportsmen to recognise sportsmanship and fair play.
