= 1962 County Championship =

English cricket tournament

- Dates: 2 May – 7 September 1962
- Cricket format: First-class cricket
- Tournament format: League system
- Champions: Yorkshire (25th title)
- Participants: 17
- Matches: 254
- Most runs: Jimmy Gray, (Hampshire); 2,196
- Most wickets: Derek Shackleton, (Hampshire); 161

The 1962 County Championship was the 63rd officially organised running of the County Championship. Yorkshire won the Championship title.

== Table ==
- 12 points for a win
- 6 points to team still batting in the fourth innings of a match in which scores finish level
- 2 points for first innings lead
- 2 bonus points for team leading on first innings if they also score faster on runs per over in first innings
- If no play possible on the first two days, and the match does not go into the second innings, the team leading on first innings scores 8 points.
- Teams played either 28 or 32 matches. Therefore, a final average was calculated by dividing the points by the matches played which determined the final placings.

	Team	P	W	L	D	No Dec	1st Inns Lead	Bonus	Pts	Average
1	Yorkshire	32	14	4	14	0	10	36	224	7.00
2	Worcestershire	32	14	3	14	1	9	34	220	6.87
3	Warwickshire	32	12	5	15	0	13	32	202	6.31
=4	Gloucestershire	28	11	11	6	0	9	24	174	6.21
=4	Surrey	28	10	3	14	1	11	32	174	6.21
6	Somerset	32	12	7	13	0	8	30	190	5.93
7	Derbyshire	28	8	6	13	1	10	28	144	5.14
8	Northamptonshire	28	7	5	16	0	11	22	128	4.57
9	Essex	28	8	6	13	1	9	12	126	4.50
10	Hampshire	32	7	5	19	1	13	30	140	4.37
11	Kent	28	7	9	10	2	5	16	110	3.92
12	Sussex	32	7	12	13	0	10	18	122	3.81
13	Middlesex	28	6	8	13	1	6	18	102	3.64
14	Glamorgan	32	6	13	13	0	5	14	96	3.00
15	Nottinghamshire	28	4	12	11	1	1	4	54	1.92
16	Lancashire	32	2	16	14	0	11	14	60	1.87
17	Leicestershire	28	2	12	13	1	7	12	50	1.78
