= Mike Wardrop =

English footballer

Personal information
- Full name: Michael Wardrop
- Date of birth: 23 December 1955 (age 70)
- Place of birth: Salford, England
- Position: Midfielder

Youth career
- 1970–1974: Manchester United

Senior career*
Years	Team	Apps	(Gls)
1974	Manchester United	0	(0)
1974	→ New York Cosmos (loan)	13	(0)
- Kettering Town
Total		13	(0)

International career
1971	England Schoolboys	5	(0)
- * Club domestic league appearances and goals

Michael Wardrop (born 23 December 1955) is an English former footballer who played as a midfielder for Manchester United and New York Cosmos.

== Career statistics ==
=== Club ===
Club	Season	League			Cup		Other		Total	
Club	Season	Division	Apps	Goals	Apps	Goals	Apps	Goals	Apps	Goals
New York Cosmos	1974	NASL	13	0	0	0	0	0	13	0
Career total			13	0	0	0	0	0	13	0
