= 1964 County Championship =

English cricket tournament

- Dates: 2 May – 4 September 1964
- Administrator: England and Wales Cricket Board
- Cricket format: First-class cricket
- Tournament format: League system
- Champions: Worcestershire (4th title)
- Participants: 17
- Matches: 238
- Most runs: Tom Graveney, (Worcestershire); 2,086
- Most wickets: Derek Shackleton, (Hampshire); 138

The 1964 County Championship was the 65th officially organised running of the County Championship. Worcestershire won their first Championship title.

Worcestershire's 41-point margin over the second-placed team was the largest in the competition since 1957, and they won the title with three matches to spare. They went to the top of the county table on 7 August from their Midlands rivals, Warwickshire, and finished the season with seven wins and a draw from their last eight matches to clinch the championship.

== Table ==
- 10 points for a win
- 5 points to each team for a tie
- 5 points to team still batting in a match in which scores finish level
- 2 points for first innings lead in a match drawn or lost
- 1 point for first innings tie in a match lost
- If no play possible on the first two days, and the match does not go into the second innings, the team leading on first innings scores 6 points. If the scores are level, the team batting second scores 3 points.
- Position determined by points gained. If equal, then decided on most wins.
- Each team plays 28 matches.

	Team	P	W	L	D	No Dec	1st Inns Lead	1st Inns Tie	Pts
1	Worcestershire	28	18	3	6	1	5	1	191
2	Warwickshire	28	14	5	9	0	5	0	150
3	Northamptonshire	28	12	4	11	1	5	0	130
4	Surrey	28	11	3	13	1	9	1	129
5	Yorkshire	28	11	3	14	0	8	0	126
6	Middlesex	28	9	6	12	1	11	0	112
7	Kent	28	9	6	12	1	9	0	108
8	Somerset	28	8	8	8	4	8	0	96
9	Sussex	28	8	9	10	1	4	0	88
10	Essex	28	7	11	8	2	8	0	86
11	Glamorgan	28	7	7	12	2	7	0	84
=12	Derbyshire	28	5	9	12	2	9	0	68
=12	Hampshire	28	5	8	14 (Note: Hampshire were awarded 5 points for the draw against Middlesex, as they were batting fourth when scores were tied.)	1	6	1	68
14	Lancashire	28	4	10	13	1	12	0	64
15	Nottinghamshire	28	4	13	11	0	7	0	54
16	Leicestershire	28	3	18	5	2	7	0	44
17	Gloucestershire	28	3	15	10	0	6	1	43
