= Aaron Downes =

Australian soccer player and manager

Personal information
- Full name: Aaron Terence Downes
- Date of birth: 15 May 1985 (age 41)
- Place of birth: Mackay, Australia
- Height: 1.85 m (6 ft 1 in)
- Position: Defender

Team information
- Current team: Hereford (manager)

Youth career
- 2003: AIS

Senior career*
Years	Team	Apps	(Gls)
2003	Hampton & Richmond	1	(0)
2003–2004	Frickley Athletic	4	(0)
2004–2012	Chesterfield	174	(10)
2012	→ Bristol Rovers (loan)	8	(0)
2012–2015	Torquay United	109	(15)
2015–2018	Cheltenham Town	48	(6)
Total		344	(31)

International career
2004	Australia U20	11	(1)
2007–2008	Australia U23	8	(4)

Managerial career
- 2018–2024: Torquay United (assistant)
- 2024: Torquay United (interim)
- 2024–2025: Cheltenham Town (assistant)
- 2025: Cheltenham Town (caretaker)
- 2026–: Hereford
- * Club domestic league appearances and goals

Aaron Terence Downes (born 15 May 1985) is an Australian former soccer player who played as a defender. He is currently manager of National League North club Hereford.

== Club career ==
Born in Mackay, Queensland and raised in Mudgee, New South Wales, Downes was signed for Chesterfield on 1 August 2004 by ex Chesterfield manager Roy MacFarland after having trials at Bolton Wanderers and a short spell at non league outfit Frickley Athletic. Before moving to England he was a player at the Australian Institute of Sport.

At the end of the 2006–07 season following his side's relegation to Football League Two not only did he sign an extension to his current contract at Chesterfield but he also was made team captain of Chesterfield following the departure of ex captain Mark Allott. Downes was at that time a valued member of the squad and as well as his defensive qualities he has an eye for goal, mainly from set pieces.

On 22 April 2009, Downes signed a new 2-year contract extension with Chesterfield, despite the defender picking up a serious knee injury before the contract was signed. He was released by the club at the end of the 2011–12 season having suffered further serious injuries during his tenure.

In July 2012 Downes signed a one-year contract with Torquay United. Manager, Martin Ling said of Downes, "He needs someone to take a punt and that is the right word for a player who has suffered two cruciates". He enjoyed a successful season, striking up a strong defensive partnership with Brian Saah, culminating in him being voted the supporters' "Player of the season". In June 2013, he signed a new two-year contract to keep him at Torquay United until 2015.

On 11 May 2015, Gary Johnson made Downes his first signing at Cheltenham Town. Although sidelined by a knee injury for a large part of 2016, he captained the side to the National League title and continued to lead them in their first season back in the English Football League.

Downes retired from football at the end of the 2017–18 season.

== International career ==
Over the years he has worked his way up at international level starting at the 2005 FIFA World Youth Championship in the Netherlands. He was also called up by the Olyroos – the Australia national under-23 football team.

== Coaching career ==
On 13 December 2018, Downes was appointed assistant manager at former club Torquay United.

On 22 February 2024, following the departure of Gary Johnson, Downes was appointed interim manager of the National League South club. On 14 May 2024, Downes' departure was confirmed having secured the club's safety in the sixth tier.

In June 2024, Downes returned to former club Cheltenham Town as assistant manager. In September 2025, following the sacking of manager Michael Flynn, Downes was appointed interim manager. He oversaw one match in charge, a 7–1 defeat to Grimsby Town, before departing the club upon the appointment of Steve Cotterill on 30 September.

On 16 February 2026, Downes was appointed manager of National League North club Hereford on a contract until the end of the season.

On 25 April 2026, shortly before the season finale of that year, Downes and his assistant Harry Pell signed a new two year contract.

== Managerial statistics ==
As of 29 August 2026

Team	From	To	Record				
Team	From	To	P	W	D	L	Win %
Torquay United (interim)	22 February 2024	14 May 2024	13	5	3	5	38.5
Hereford	16 February 2026	—	26	12	4	10	46.2
Total			39	17	7	15	43.6

== Honours ==
=== Club ===
Chesterfield

- Football League Two: 2010–11

Cheltenham Town

- National League: 2015–16

=== International ===
Australia national football team

- OFC U-20 Championship: 2005

=== Individual ===
- Chesterfield Player of the Year: 2006–07
- Torquay United Player of the Year: 2012–13
