= Niall Thompson (footballer, born 1993) =

English footballer

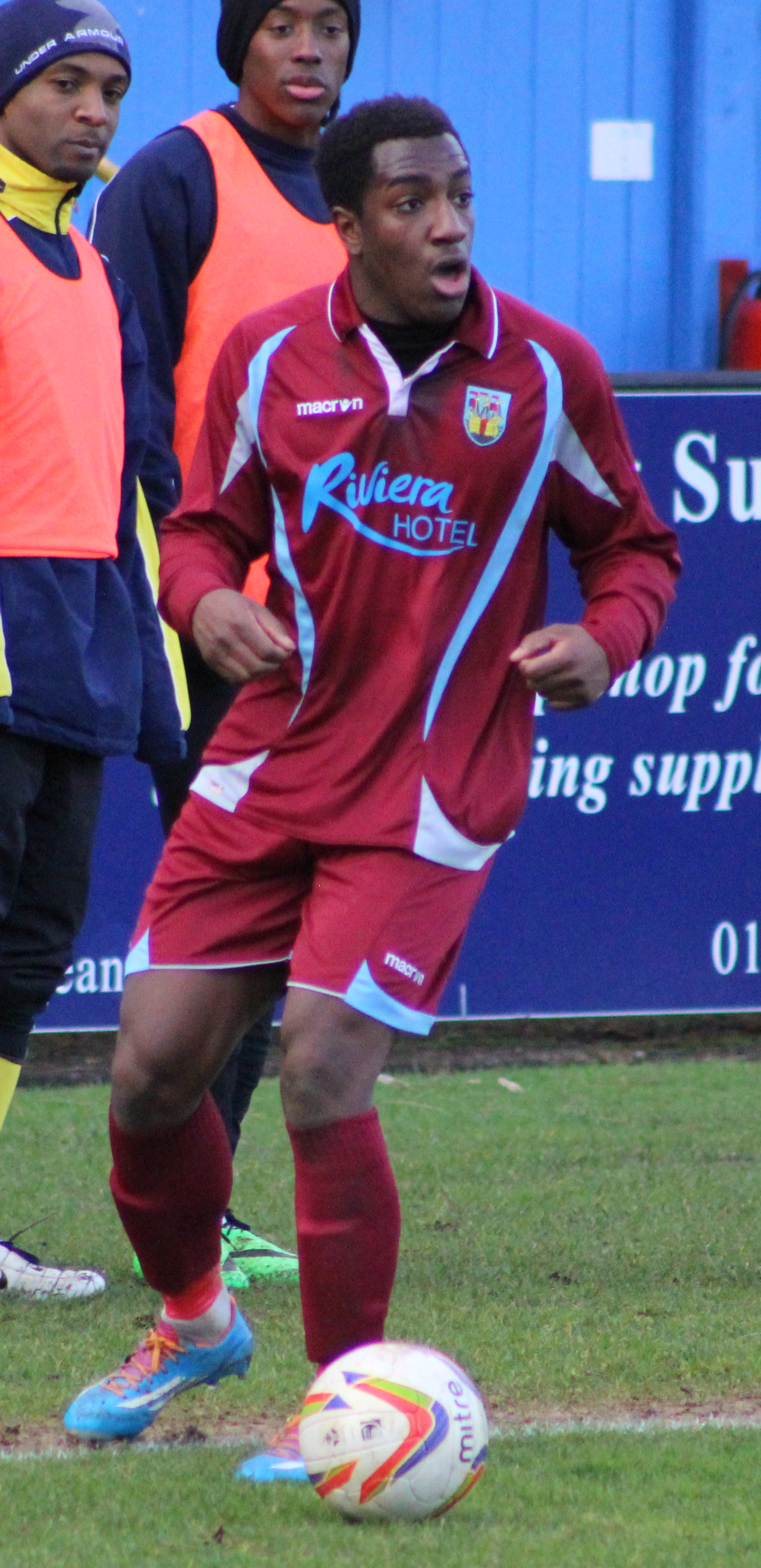
- Thompson playing for Weymouth

Personal information
- Full name: Niall Joseph Israel Thompson
- Date of birth: 3 September 1993 (age 33)
- Place of birth: Derby, England
- Positions: Winger; wing-back

Team information
- Current team: Taunton Town

Youth career
- 2010–2012: Torquay United

Senior career*
Years	Team	Apps	(Gls)
2012–2015	Torquay United	24	(0)
2013	→ Worcester City (loan)	7	(0)
2014	→ Weymouth (loan)	5	(0)
2014	→ Bideford (loan)		
2014	→ Truro City (loan)	3	(0)
2015	Hucknall Town	23	(22)
2016–2022	Truro City	183	(23)
2022–2025	Tiverton Town	115	(13)
2025–	Taunton Town	0	(0)
- * Club domestic league appearances and goals as of 13:57, 26 May 2025 (UTC)

Niall Joseph Israel Thompson (born 3 September 1993) is an English professional footballer who is currently plays as a defender for Southern League Premier Division South club Taunton Town. He plays as a winger, but his versatility has seen him more recently act as a wing-back.

== Torquay United ==
After coming through the Torquay youth system, he was offered a professional contract at the beginning of the 2012–13 season. He made his senior debut on 14 August 2012 in Torquay's 4–0 League Cup defeat Leicester City, coming on as a substitute for Craig Easton in the 63rd minute. Niall made his League debut on 25 August 2012 at home to Rochdale, his performance was very impressive for an 18-year-old and he was awarded 'Man of the match' for his efforts on his debut.

On 21 November 2014, Thompson signed on a month's loan with Southern League club Truro City, having previously been loaned to Bideford earlier in the 2014–15 season. He made his debut as a substitute in Truro's 2–1 win at Dunstable Town on 22 November. On his return to Torquay, he was released at the end of his contract at the beginning of January 2015.

On 11 July 2016, Thompson signed a permanent deal with Truro City, now of the National League South. He has also played for Hucknall Town, Sheffield and Mickleover Sports.

In May 2025, Thompson joined Taunton Town following three seasons with Tiverton Town.

== Career statistics ==
As of match played 25 November 2017

Appearances and goals by club, season and competition
Club	Season	League			FA Cup		League Cup		Other		Total	
Club	Season	Division	Apps	Goals	Apps	Goals	Apps	Goals	Apps	Goals	Apps	Goals
Torquay United	2012–13	League Two	18	0	1	0	1	0	1 (Note: Appearance in the Football League Trophy)	0	21	0
Torquay United	2013–14	League Two	3	0	0	0	1	0	0	0	4	0
Torquay United	2014–15	Conference Premier	3	0	0	0	—		0	0	3	0
Torquay United	Torquay total		24	0	1	0	2	0	1	0	28	0
Worcester City (loan)	2013–14	Conference North	7	0	2	0	—		0	0	9	0
Weymouth (loan)	2013–14	SFL - Premier Division	5	0	—		—		0	0	5	0
Bideford (loan)	2014–15	SFL - Premier Division					—					
Truro City (loan)	2014–15	SFL - Premier Division	3	0	0	0	—		0	0	3	0
Loans total			15	0	2	0	0	0	0	0	17	0
Hucknall Town	2014–15	Central Midlands FL - South	3	6	—		—		—		3	6
Hucknall Town	2015–16	Central Midlands FL - South	20	16	—		—		—		20	16
Hucknall Town	Hucknall total		23	22	0	0	0	0	0	0	23	22
Truro City	2016–17	National League South	42	10	0	0	—		2 (Note: Appearances in the FA Trophy)	0	44	10
Truro City	2017–18	National League South	32	3	1	0	—		0	0	33	3
Truro City	2018–19	National League South	40	3	2	0	—		0	0	42	3
Truro City	2019–20	SFL - Premier Division South	0	0	0	0	—		0	0	0	0
Truro City	Truro City total		114	16	3	0	0	0	2	0	119	16
Career total			176	38	6	0	2	0	3	0	187	38
