= Emanuel Carrette =

Brazilian footballer (born 1948)

Personal information
- Date of birth: May 24, 1948 (age 78)
- Place of birth: Brazil
- Height: 5 ft 10 in (1.78 m)
- Position: Forward

Youth career
- Flamengo
- Desportiva

Senior career*
Years	Team	Apps	(Gls)
1971	Ceará	1	(0)
1974	New York Cosmos	1	(0)
1974	Denver Dynamos		
Total		2	(0)
- * Club domestic league appearances and goals

Emanuel Carrette (born May 24, 1948) is a former Brazilian soccer player who played in the NASL.

== Career statistics ==
=== Club ===
Club	Season	League			Cup		Other		Total	
Club	Season	Division	Apps	Goals	Apps	Goals	Apps	Goals	Apps	Goals
Ceará	1971	Série A	1	0	0	0	0	0	1	0
New York Cosmos	1974	NASL	1	0	0	0	0	0	1	0
Career total			2	0	0	0	0	0	2	0
