= Dick Sheppard (footballer) =

English footballer

Personal information
- Full name: Richard James Sheppard
- Date of birth: 14 February 1945
- Place of birth: Bristol, England
- Date of death: 18 October 1998 (aged 53)
- Place of death: Bristol, England
- Height: 6 ft 0 in (1.83 m)
- Position: Goalkeeper

Youth career
- 1960–1963: West Bromwich Albion

Senior career*
Years	Team	Apps	(Gls)
1963–1969	West Bromwich Albion	39	(0)
1969–1975	Bristol Rovers	151	(0)
1973	→ Torquay United (loan)	2	(0)
1975	→ Fulham (loan)	0	(0)
1975–1976	Weymouth		
1976–1977	Portway Bristol		
1977–1980	Paulton Rovers		
Total		192	(0)
- * Club domestic league appearances and goals

Richard James Sheppard (14 February 1945 – 18 October 1998) was an English professional footballer who played as a goalkeeper in The Football League for West Bromwich Albion, Bristol Rovers, and Torquay United.

== Career ==
Sheppard represented Gloucester Schools as a child, before being signed by West Brom as an apprentice in 1960. He joined the professional ranks at the club in 1963 and went on to play 39 League games in six years with The Baggies. He moved back to his home city of Bristol in 1969 to join Bristol Rovers, and made 150 league appearances before suffering a skull fracture in January 1973 in a match against Tranmere Rovers at Eastville Stadium.

It was eleven months before he was to play again, when he joined Torquay United on loan in December 1973 in a deal that was set up in a roadside meeting between Rovers and Torquay near Bridgwater. He played just two games for Torquay, and it was a further year before he finally made it back into the Bristol Rovers lineup. His only appearance for The Pirates after breaking his skull came against Bristol City in December 1974, and after conceding four goals in the second half his professional career came to an abrupt end. Although he was sent out on loan to Fulham later in the season he never played in the Football League again.

In the summer of 1975, Sheppard joined non-League side Weymouth, where he spent a year, followed by a further year back in Bristol with Portway Bristol. He moved to Paulton Rovers in 1977, and in January 1980 became the goalkeeping coach for his former club Bristol Rovers. He died in 1998 at the age of 53.

== Honours ==
West Bromwich Albion

- Football League Cup runner-up: 1966–67

== Sources ==
- Jay, Mike; Byrne, Stephen (1994). Pirates in Profile: A Who's Who of Bristol Rovers Players. Bristol: Potten, Baber & Murray. pp. 235–236. ISBN 0-9524835-0-5.
- Byrne, Stephen; Jay, Mike (2003). Bristol Rovers Football Club – The Definitive History 1883–2003. Stroud: Tempus. p. 505. ISBN 0-7524-2717-2.
