= Taunton Town F.C. =

Association football club in England

Coordinates: 51°01′00″N 3°05′06″W

Taunton Town
- Full name: Taunton Town Football Club
- Nickname: The Peacocks
- Founded: December 1947; 78 years ago (as Taunton F.C.)
- Ground: Wordsworth Drive, Taunton
- Capacity: 3,000
- Chairman: Brian Pollard
- Manager: Gary Johnson
- League: Southern League Premier Division South
- 2025–26: Southern League Premier Division South, 16th of 22
- Website: tauntontown.com
Home colours	Away colours

Taunton Town Football Club is an English football club based in Taunton, Somerset. They compete in the Southern League Premier Division South, the seventh tier of the English football league system, and play their home matches at Wordsworth Drive, which they moved into during the 1953 season. The club is affiliated to the Somerset County FA.

After being formed in 1947, they were admitted into the Western League in 1954. They struggled over the next ten years, and it was not until the 1970s that the club started to prosper. Having won the Western League in 1968–69, the club then finished as runners-up in the same league in four successive seasons from 1973. They gained promotion to the Southern League in 1977 and purchased their ground from the local council. In the early 1980s, they dropped back down into the Western League for financial reasons, but did not enjoy further success until 1989–90. The following twelve seasons saw the club win the title on four more occasions (1995–96, 1998–99, 1999–2000, and 2000–01) and finish as runners-up four times (1993–94, 1996–97, 1997–98, and 2001–02).

In 2001, the club won the FA Vase, which it had narrowly missed out on seven years earlier. Following their string of good results, Taunton rejoined the Southern League for the 2002–03 season. In April 2022, victory over Farnborough saw the club promoted as champions to the National League South, the highest level in the club's history.

== History ==
The first Taunton Association Football Club was formed on 11 September 1889 at the George Hotel. This club was known variously as Taunton, Taunton United and Taunton Town and had disbanded and reformed many times before finally withdrawing from the Southern League and folding for good in 1935.

In December 1947, a group of businessmen founded Taunton Football Club, and the club played its first match in Easter the following year. The club joined the Somerset Senior League, in which they played until 1953. During this year, the club gained admission to the Western League for the first time. In the same year, the club also moved into their present ground on Wordsworth Drive, which they leased from Taunton Borough Council. During these early years of the club, they battled financial problems and relied upon their Supporters Club.

In 1968–69, the club enjoyed success for the first time, winning the Western League under the management of Doug Hillard. Over the following years, Taunton Town continued to prosper on the pitch, finishing as Western League runners-up in four consecutive seasons from 1973 until 1976. During this time, the club bought their Wordsworth Drive ground from the local council and installed floodlights. In 1977, they were promoted into the Southern League (Southern Section). Two years later, following the opening of the M5 motorway, they moved into the Midlands Section of the league.

In 1981, the club became a limited company, and the club's board decided that competing in the Southern League was too much of a financial burden; resulting in a drop back into the Western League for the 1983–84 season. The club finished as league champions for the second time in 1989–90 and followed this win up with further success, winning the league again in 1995–96, 1998–99, 1999–2000, and 2000–01. They also finished as runners-up on four occasions; in 1993–94, 1996–97, 1997–98, and 2001–02. Following their runners-up position in 2001–02, and the improved financial position of the club compared to twenty years earlier, the club was successful in its application to re-enter the Southern League. The club have remained in this league ever since, and after the restructuring of the English football league system, the club were placed in the Southern Football League Division One South & West.

The club reached the final of the FA Vase in 1994, where they lost in extra time to Diss Town. A second FA Vase finals appearance in 2001 resulted in greater success, Taunton Town beating Berkhamsted Town 2–1. In 2016–17, they reached the first round proper of the FA Cup for only the second time in their history, where they faced Barrow and held them to a 2–2 draw but were beaten away in the replay 2–1.

In 2017–18, Taunton celebrated promotion from the Southern League South & West for the first time in their history, clinching the title after a home 3–2 win over Kidlington.

In 2018–19, Taunton narrowly missed out on promotion to the National League South after losing to Poole Town on penalties at the Viridor Stadium during their Southern League Premier playoff game.

On 20 November 2019, Taunton Town equaled the record for the longest penalty shoot out in English footballing history beating Truro City 12–11 after 34 penalties in the Southern League challenge cup. Goalkeeper Lloyd Irish scored one and missed another whilst also saving three penalties with Truro missing the target another three times before Jack Rice finally scored the winning penalty after 34 minutes of drama.

On 23 April 2022, Taunton won the final match of the 2021–22 season against third-placed Farnborough, securing their place as champions at the top of the league and promotion to the National League South for the first time in the club's history. Taunton finished 14th in the 2022–23 season, their inaugural season in National League South. After 11 games of the 2023–24 season, they topped the division for the first time after an excellent start to the campaign which included only one loss. On 17 January 2024, Taunton were issued a winding-up petition from His Majesty's Revenue and Customs (HMRC). As a result of the ongoing dispute, a number of senior players departed and the club were placed under a transfer embargo by the National League on 2 February. On 6 March 2024, the club issued a statement confirming that they had been unable to fully pay players or staff, in addition to the inability to pay their commitments to HMRC.

At the end of the 2023–24 season, Taunton finished 22nd and were relegated for the first time in the club's history. Taunton appointed new manager Richard Luffman, who inherited a squad of no players and had to rebuild the team to compete in the Southern League Premier Division.

== Stadium ==
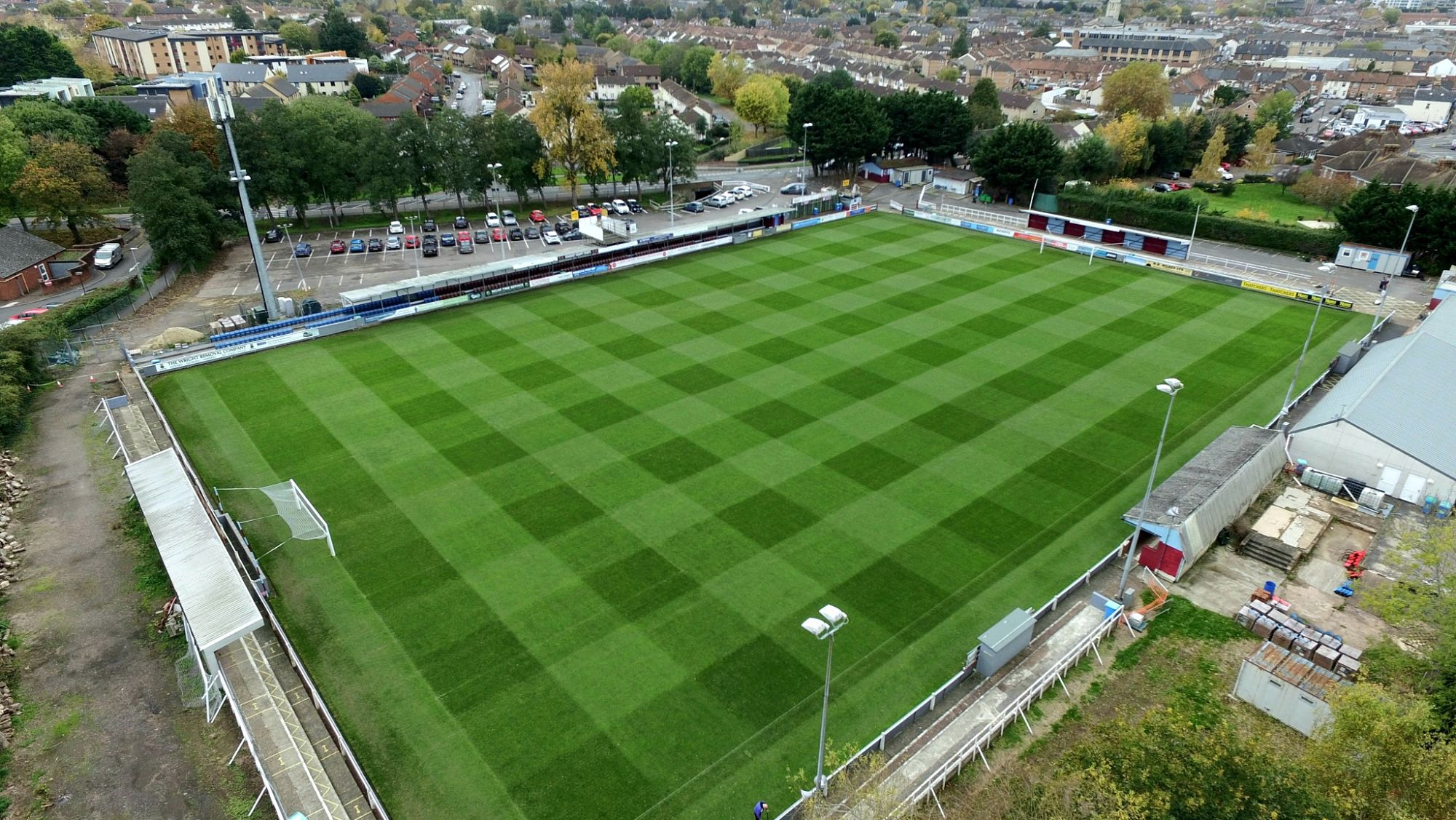
Wordsworth Drive

Taunton Town play their home games at Wordsworth Drive. When they were first formed, they played at a variety of grounds in the Taunton area, including Mountfields, French Weir, Victoria Park, and Huish Old Boys. They then moved to Denman's Park, Haines Hill, where they remained until 1953. During that season, the club moved to Wordsworth Drive in Taunton, where they have remained ever since. Initially, they leased the ground from Taunton Borough Council, but in the 1970s, the club purchased the ground from the council and installed floodlights. The ground has covered stands on all four sides of the pitch.

As of January 2024, the stadium has a capacity of 3,000 with 422 seats. The record attendance was set at 3,284 against Tiverton Town in the 1998/1999 FA Vase Semi-Final.

A first naming rights deal was reached in 2014 with Viridor, a waste management company, and then in 2019, with Cygnet Health Care.

On 3 November 2023, then Chairman Kevin Sturmey announced a stadium sponsorship deal with a local business for Wordsworth Drive to be known as the Somerset Campervan Co Stadium through the end of the 2023–24 season, along with an option to extend. The agreement included a two-year sponsorship of the home side Town End.

In the summer of 2024, Wordsworth Drive returned to its previous name of the Cygnet Health Care Stadium following a new sponsorship deal with the health care provider.

== Current squad ==
Note: Flags indicate national team as defined under FIFA eligibility rules; some limited exceptions apply. Players may hold more than one non-FIFA nationality.

No.	Pos.	Nation	Player
1	GK	ENG	Isaac Finch (on loan from Bristol City)
2	DF	ENG	Niall Thompson
3	DF	NZL	Joe Jeremiah
4	DF	ENG	Nick Grimes (captain)
5	DF	ENG	Max Hill
6	DF	ENG	Jamie Richards
7	FW	ENG	Jack Rice
8	MF	WAL	Dylan Jones
9	FW	ENG	Ben Seymour (vice-captain)
10	MF	ENG	Alfie Moulden
11	FW	ENG	Dan Koita

No.	Pos.	Nation	Player
12	MF	ENG	Gabe Billington
13	GK	ENG	Lloyd Irish
14	MF	ENG	Harry Watts
15	MF	ENG	Phil Mendonca
16	DF	ENG	Jack Anthony
17	DF	ENG	Max Davies
18	FW	ENG	Scott Robinson
20	DF	ENG	Sam Lord

== Management ==
Position	Name
Manager:	Gary Johnson
Assistant Manager:
Goalkeeping Coach:	Sam Naylor
Kit Man:	Rich Smith
Performance Analyst:	Joe Jackson
Performance Analyst:	Tom Delia
School Liaison Officer:	Greg Morrison

== Honours ==
- Southern League
  - Premier Division South champions 2021–22
  - Division One West champions 2017–18
- Western League
  - Champions 1968–69, 1989–90, 1995–96, 1998–99, 1999–2000, 2000–01
  - Alan Young Cup winners 1973–74, 1975–76 (shared with Falmouth Town)
  - Combination Challenge Cup winners 1990–91, 1993–94, 1994–95
  - Combination Subsidiary League Cup winners 1991–92, 1992–93, 1993–94
- FA Vase
  - Winners 2000–01
- Somerset Senior Cup
  - Winners 1969–70
- Somerset Premier Cup
  - Winners 2002–03, 2005–06, 2013–14, 2014–15, 2016–17, 2023–24

== Taunton Town FC Women ==
Taunton Town had a Women's football team; Taunton Town FC Women, who played in the South West Women's Football League Premier Division. They first played league football in 1986. In 1990–91, the ladies won the Division Two Cup of the newly formed South West Regional Women's Football League. The club ceased to exist at the end of the 2014–15 season.

A new Taunton Town FC Women's team was announced in March 2025 with the Peahens being accepted into the Somerset County Women's League for the 2025–26 season.

== See also ==
- Taunton Town F.C. players
- Taunton Town F.C. managers
