= Barry Hugman =

English sports author, statistician and historian

Barry John Hugman (born 1941) is an English sports author, statistician, and historian. He has published various works that include collated football statistics, and the records of all players in the Football League since 1946. Hugman also helped establish the British Boxing Board of Control (BBBofC) Awards in 1984, and in 2011 he received their "Award of Excellence". In 1989, Hugman co-founded and was the launch editor of Boxing Monthly magazine, Britain's first colour monthly about boxing. With the growing popularity of the internet and social media becoming the popular choice for news and information, the magazine ended in 2020 after 31 years of publication.

== Football publications ==
- Football League Players’ Records, 1946–1981. Now called PFA Premier & Football League Players Records, there have been six further editions: 1984, 1988, 1992, 1998, 2005 and 2015.
- Hugman’s Football Annual. Formerly the Football League Year, there were two editions, 1989 and 1990.
- The Official Football League Yearbook. First published in 1991, there was a further edition in 1992.
- Premier League: The Players. First published in 1992, there was a further edition in 1993.
- Footballers’ Who’s Who in association with the Professional Footballers' Association. Launched in 1995 as the PFA Footballers’ Factfile, there were 15 further editions.

== Boxing publications ==
In Mike Silver's review of Hugman's The Definitive History of World Championship Boxing he described the four-volume book series as "epic" and a "monumental work – 30 years in the making" as it chronicled every championship fight from 1870 to 2016. The series includes the following volumes:

- Vol. 1 – mini flyweight to bantamweight;
- Vol. 2 – junior featherweight to lightweight;
- Vol. 3 – junior welterweight to middleweight;
- Vol. 4 – super middleweight to heavyweight

in 2019 and 2021 these volumes were re-packaged as:

- Vol. 1 – mini flyweight to junior featherweight;
- Vol. 2 – featherweight to welterweight;
- Vol. 3 – junior middleweight to heavyweight

=== Other boxing publications ===
- The George Wimpey Amateur Boxing Association Yearbook, 1982
- British Boxing Board of Control British Boxing Yearbook. Published annually from 1984 to 2010 26 editions
- Hugman's International Boxing Year, published in 1988, 1989 and 1990
- Lineal World Boxing Champions, 1892–2019

== Other sporting publications ==
- The Sporting Life Jockeyform: Flat Racing, 1987
- The Olympic Games: Complete Track & Field Results, 1896–1988
- Hugman’s Amateur Swimming Association Yearbook, 1990
