= 2013–14 Torquay United F.C. season =

Torquay United
2013–14 season
- Chairman: Simon Baker
- Manager: Chris Hargreaves
- League Two: 24th (relegated)
- FA Cup: First round
- League Cup: First round
- League Trophy: First round
- Top goalscorer: League: Jordan Chapell (5); All: Jordan Chapell (5)
- Highest home attendance: 4,231 vs. Exeter City; 29 December 2013 (League Two)
- Lowest home attendance: 2,004 vs. Morecambe; 4 January 2014 (League Two)
- Average home league attendance: 2,970
Home colours	Away colours	Third colours

The 2013–14 Torquay United F.C. season was Torquay United's 78th season in the Football League and their fifth consecutive season in League Two. The season ran from 1 July 2013 to 30 June 2014.

== First team squad ==
Note: Flags indicate national team as defined under FIFA eligibility rules; some limited exceptions apply. Players may hold more than one non-FIFA nationality.

No.	Pos.	Nation	Player
1	GK	ENG	Michael Poke
2	DF	ENG	Dale Tonge
3	DF	ENG	Kevin Nicholson
4	DF	AUS	Aaron Downes
5	DF	ENG	Krystian Pearce
6	MF	ENG	Damon Lathrope
7	MF	ENG	Lee Mansell
8	FW	ENG	Ben Harding
9	FW	ENG	Karl Hawley
10	FW	WAL	Billy Bodin
11	MF	ENG	Courtney Cameron
12	DF	ENG	Jordan Chapell
13	GK	ENG	Martin Rice
14	MF	ENG	Ashley Yeoman

No.	Pos.	Nation	Player
15	MF	ENG	Niall Thompson
16	DF	ENG	Shaun Cooper
17	MF	ENG	Shamir Goodwin (on loan from Brighton)
18	MF	ENG	Joss Labadie
19	FW	ENG	Jayden Stockley (on loan from Bournemouth)
20	MF	WAL	Nathan Craig
21	DF	ENG	Thomas Cruise
22	MF	ENG	Sam Chaney
23	MF	ENG	Danny Stevens
26	FW	ENG	Elliot Benyon
27	FW	ENG	Shaq Coulthirst (on loan from Tottenham)
29	DF	ENG	Anthony O'Connor (on loan from Blackburn)
30	DF	ENG	Baily Cargill (on loan from Bournemouth)

== End of season honours ==
At the end of the 2013–14 season 5 awards were given out for, Youth Player of the Season, Youth Player of the Season, Top Goalscorer, Away Player of the Season and Player of the Season.

Youth Player of the Season – Daniel Lavercombe (GK)

Young Player of the Season – Anthony O'Connor

Top Goalscorer – Jordan Chapell

Away Player of the Season – Martin Rice

Player of the Season – Krystian Pearce

== League statistics ==
=== League Two ===
Pos	Team	Pld	W	D	L	GF	GA	GD	Pts	Promotion, qualification or relegation
20	AFC Wimbledon	46	14	14	18	49	57	−8	53 (Note: On 28 April AFC Wimbledon were deducted 3 points for fielding an ineligible player.)	
21	Northampton Town	46	13	14	19	42	57	−15	53	
22	Wycombe Wanderers	46	12	14	20	46	54	−8	50	
23	Bristol Rovers (R)	46	12	14	20	43	54	−11	50	Relegation to the Conference Premier
24	Torquay United (R)	46	12	9	25	42	66	−24	45	Relegation to the Conference Premier

Updated to match(es) played on 3 May 2014. Source: BBC Sport
Rules for classification: 1) Points; 2) Goal difference; 3) Number of goals scored
(R) Relegated

=== Results summary ===
Overall								Home						Away					
Pld	W	D	L	GF	GA	GD	Pts	W	D	L	GF	GA	GD	W	D	L	GF	GA	GD
46	12	9	25	42	66	−24	45	4	8	11	18	31	−13	8	1	14	24	35	−11

Last updated: 3 May 2014.
Source: Torquay United

=== Results by round ===
Round	1	2	3	4	5	6	7	8	9	10	11	12	13	14	15	16	17	18	19	20	21	22	23	24	25	26	27	28	29	30	31	32	33	34	35	36	37	38	39	40	41	42	43	44	45	46
Ground	H	A	H	A	H	A	A	H	A	H	A	H	A	H	A	H	A	H	A	H	A	H	H	A	H	A	A	A	H	A	H	H	H	A	H	H	A	H	A	A	H	A	H	A	A	H
Result	D	D	L	W	D	L	L	W	L	L	L	D	L	D	W	L	L	D	L	W	W	D	L	L	D	W	L	W	L	L	L	D	L	L	W	L	W	L	L	L	L	W	L	W	W	L
Position	14	15	19	13	16	19	19	16	18	21	22	21	22	22	21	23	23	23	24	24	22	22	23	23	23	23	23	23	23	23	24	24	24	24	24	24	24	24	24	24	24	24	24	24	24	24

Updated to match(es) played on 3 May 2014. Source: torquayunited.com
A = Away; H = Home; W = Win; D = Draw; L = Loss

== Results ==
=== Friendlies ===
12 July 2013	Torquay United	4–0	Royal Marines	Plainmoor
19:00 BST	Bodin (4), Downes (14), Yeoman (68,88)			Attendance: N/A; Referee: Brendan Malone

16 July 2013	Torquay United	2–0	Yeovil Town	Plainmoor
19:30 BST	Chappell (83), Sullivan (90)			Attendance: 1,168; Referee: Brett Huxtable

20 July 2013	Salisbury City	0–1	Torquay United	Raymond McEnhill Stadium
15:00 BST	Bodin Pen(55)			Referee: Roger East

23 July 2013	Tiverton	1–1	Torquay United	Ladysmead
19:30 BST	Malsom (67)		Craig (37)

27 July 2013	Hereford United	0–1	Torquay United	Edgar Street
13:00 BST			Downes (72)	Attendance: 556

=== League Two ===
3 August 2013	Torquay United	1–1	AFC Wimbledon	Plainmoor
15:00 BST	Pearce (yellow card) 45'; Downes 90'		Pell 87'	Attendance: 3,441; Referee: Tim Robinson

10 August 2013	Morecambe	1–1	Torquay United	Globe Arena
15.00BST	Williams 25'; Drummond (yellow card) 52'		Hawley 55'; Tonge (yellow card) 21' (yellow-red card) 86'	Attendance: 1,555; Referee: Richard Clark

17 August 2013	Torquay United	1–3	Oxford United	Plainmoor
15:00 GMT	Cameron (yellow card) 13'; Rice (yellow card) 14'; Chapell 69'		Davies (yellow card) 48'; Smalley 47'; Constable 62'; Hall 78'	Attendance: 3,126; Referee: Graham Salisbury

24 August 2013	Northampton Town	1–2	Torquay United	Sixfields Stadium
15:00 GMT	Blyth 30'		Chapell 72' 78'	Attendance: 4,088; Referee: Andrew Madley

31 August 2013	Torquay United	0–0	Hartlepool United	Plainmoor
15:00 GMT	Ball (yellow card) 84'		Howard (yellow card) 29'; Walker (yellow card) 50'	Attendance: 2,646; Referee: Oliver Langford

7 September 2013	Fleetwood Town	4–1	Torquay United	Highbury Stadium
15:00 BST	Antoni Sarcevic 10' 37'; Jeff Hughes (yellow card) 51'; Matt 62'; Blair 90'		Harding (yellow card) 28'; Mansell (yellow card) 30'; Benyon 89'	Attendance: 2,426; Referee: Darren Drysdale

14 September 2013	Rochdale	1–0	Torquay United	Spotland Stadium
15:00 GMT	Henderson 77'; O'Connell (yellow card) 82'			Attendance: 2,138; Referee: Mark Haywood

21 September 2013	Torquay United	4–2	Cheltenham Town	Plainmoor
15:00 BST	Ball 2' 45'; Hawley 49'; Downes (yellow card) 50'; Chapell 89'		Harrison 13'; Noble (yellow card) 45'; Gornell 65'	Attendance: 2,407; Referee: Darren Deadman

28 September 2013	Newport County	2–1	Torquay United	Rodney Parade
15:00 GMT	Yakubu 28'; Crow 36'; Willmott (yellow card) 72'		Lathrope (yellow card) 17'; Azeez 58'; Bodin (yellow card) 62'	Attendance: 3,557; Referee: Iain Willamson

5 October 2013	Torquay United	0–3	York City	Plainmoor
15:00 GMT	O'Connor (yellow card) 67'		Fletcher 53'; O'Neill (yellow card) 65'; Carson 67'; Jarvis 73'	Attendance: 2,559; Referee: Michael Naylor

12 October 2012	Wycombe Wanderers	3–2	Torquay United	Adams Park
15:00 BST	Kuffour 28'; Cowan-Hall 53' 77'		Azeez 27'; Pearce 37' (yellow card) 64'; Lathrope (yellow card) 59'	Attendance: 3,466; Referee: Sebastian Stockbridge

19 October 2013	Torquay United	0–0	Mansfield Town	Plainmoor
15:00 GMT	Pearce (yellow card) 17' 69; McCourt (yellow card) 39'		Sutton (yellow card) 67'	Attendance: 2,473; Referee: Mick Russell

22 January 2013	Burton Albion	2–0	Torquay United	Pirelli Stadium
15:00 GMT	Cansdell-Sherriff (yellow card) 36'; Hussey (yellow card) 43'; Phillips 70'; McGurk 80'			Attendance: 2,005; Referee: Simon Hopper

26 October 2013	Torquay United	1–1	Portsmouth	Plainmoor
15:00 GMT	Chapell 1'		Marquis (yellow card) 25'; Cooper (yellow card) 78'; Bird 81'	Attendance: 3,843; Referee: Andy Woolmer

2 November 2013	Bury	1–3	Torquay United	Gigg Lane
15:00 BST	Cameron 24' (yellow card) 24'		Downes 18'; McCallum 29' 57' (yellow card) 57'	Attendance: 2,997; Referee: James Adcock

16 November 2013	Torquay United	0–2	Chesterfield	Plainmoor
15:00 GMT	Hawley (yellow card) 32'		Banks 15'; O'Shea 19'; Talbot (yellow card) 24'	Attendance: 2,361; Referee: Darren Sheldrake

23 November 2013	Accrington Stanley	2–1	Torquay United	Crown Ground
15:00 GMT	Naismith 42' 74'; Hunt (yellow card) 66'		McCallum 14' (yellow card) 77'; Tonge (yellow card) 29'; Mozika (yellow card) 57'	Attendance: 1,279; Referee: Graham Horwood

26 November 2013	Torquay United	1–1	Plymouth Argyle	Plainmoor
15:00 BST	Benyon 6'		Reid (9 p); Hourihane (yellow card) 57'; Berry (yellow card) 89'	Attendance: 3,866; Referee: Roger East

23 November 2013	Scunthorpe United	3–1	Torquay United	Glanford Park
15:00 GMT	Winnall 6'; O'Connor 30' (o.g.); Adelakun 61'		Cruise (yellow card) 72'; Marquis 78'	Attendance: 3,358; Referee: Steven Rushton

14 December 2013	Torquay United	1–0	Southend United	Plainmoor
15:00 GMT	Marquis 50'			Attendance: 2,144; Referee: Stephen Martin

21 December 2013	Dagenham & Redbridge	0–1	Torquay United	Victoria Road
15:00 GMT			Downes 50'	Attendance: 1,675; Referee: Lee Collins

26 December 2013	Torquay United	1–1	Bristol Rovers	Plainmoor
15:00 GMT	Marquis (9 p); Tonge (yellow card) 10'; Mansell (yellow card) 43'; McCourt (yellow card) 58'		Harrold 27'	Attendance: 3,461; Referee: Philip Gibbs

29 December 2013	Torquay United	1–3	Exeter City	Plainmoor
15:00 GMT	Downes (yellow card) 63'; Hawley 74'; Mansell (yellow card) 77'; Benyon (yellow card) 83'		Nichols 38'; Wheeler 60'; Gow 85'	Attendance: 4,231; Referee: Stuart Attwell

1 January 2014	Plymouth Argyle	2–0	Torquay United	Home Park
15:00 GMT	Lavery 60' (yellow card) 60'; Alessandra 85' (yellow card) 87'		Downes (yellow card) 5'; Poke (yellow card) 35'	Attendance: 10,126; Referee: Keith Stroud

4 January 2014	Torquay United	1–1	Morecambe	Plainmoor
15:00 BST	Downes 17' (yellow card) 64'		Robbie Threlfall (yellow card) 27' (goal) 84'; McGee (yellow card) 50'; Hughes (yellow card) 66'	Attendance: 2,004; Referee: Gavin Ward

11 January 2014	AFC Wimbledon	0–2	Torquay United	Kingsmeadow
15:00 BST	Moore (yellow card) 41'; Fuller (yellow card) 90'		Pearce 29'; Mansell (yellow card) 33'; Stockley 43'; Nicholson (yellow card) 54'; Lathrope (yellow card) 74'	Attendance: 4,339; Referee: Darren Deadman

25 January 2014	Oxford United	1–0	Torquay United	Kassam Stadium
15:00 GMT	Smalley 6'; Danny Rose (footballer born 1988) (yellow card) 68'		Elliot Benyon (yellow card) 59'; Downes (yellow card) 74'; Lathrope (yellow card) 76'	Attendance: 4,744; Referee: Carl Berry

1 February 2014	Portsmouth	0–1	Torquay United	Fratton Park
15:00 BST			Bodin 27'	Attendance: 15,474; Referee: Dean Whitestone

11 February 2014	Torquay United	1–2	Northampton Town	Plainmoor
15:00 GMT	Labadie (yellow card) 28'; Pearce 45' (yellow card) 79'; Benyon (yellow card) 56'		Sinclair 10' 16'; Ravenhill (yellow card) 33'	Attendance: 2,051; Referee: Chris Sarginson

15 February 2014	Chesterfield	3–1	Torquay United	Proact Stadium
15:00 BST	Banks (yellow card) 42'; Doyle 56'; O'Shea 80' 90'		Goodwin 50'; Stockley (yellow card) 73' Wilkinson (yellow card) 90'	Attendance: 5,012; Referee: Carl Boyeson

22 February 2014	Torquay United	0–1	Accrington Stanley	Plainmoor
15:00 BST	Cruise (yellow card) 40'; Labadie (yellow card) 72'	Summary	Hunt (yellow card) 49'; Joyce (yellow card) 74'; Naismith 80'	Attendance: 2,218; Referee: (England) Simon Hooper

25 February 2014	Torquay United	1–1	Burton Albion	Plainmoor
19:45 BST	Benyon 40'	Summary	McCrory 33'; Sharps (yellow card) 86'	Attendance: 1,583; Referee: (England) Brendan Malone

1 March 2014	Hartlepool United	3–0	Torquay United	Victoria Park
15:00 BST	Barmby 31'; James 54'; Harewood 64'	Summary		Attendance: 3,437; Referee: (England) Fred Graham

8 March 2014	Torquay United	0–1	Fleetwood Town	Plainmoor
15:00 GMT	Mansell (yellow card) 24'	Summary	Matt 74'; Hughes (yellow card) 85'; Pond (yellow card) 90+2'	Attendance: 2,245; Referee: (England) Steve Rushton

11 March 2014	Torquay United	2–1	Rochdale	Plainmoor
19:45 BST	Pearce 17'; Labadie (yellow card) 70' (goal) 82'	Summary	Lancashire (yellow card) 16' (yellow-red card); Allen 39'	Attendance: 1,627; Referee: (England) Graham Horwood

15 March 2014	Cheltenham Town	1–0	Torquay United	Whaddon Road
15:00 GMT	Sido Jombati (yellow card) 45+1'; Richards 75'	Summary	Downes (yellow card) 63'	Attendance: 3,105; Referee: (England) Mark Haywood

18 March 2014	Torquay United	2–1	Bury	Plainmoor
19:45 BST	Mansell 8' (yellow card) 80'; Cameron (yellow card) 32'; Pearce (yellow card) 45+2'; Benyon (yellow card) 53'; Yeoman 90+1'	Summary	Mills (yellow card) 54'; Platt 66'	Attendance: 1,738; Referee: (England) David Phillips

22 March 2014	Torquay United	0–1	Newport County	Plainmoor
15:00 GMT	Goodwin (red card) 34'; Pearce (yellow card) 82'	Summary	Zebroski 8'; Minshull (yellow card) 75'	Attendance: 2,874; Referee: (England) Gary Sutton

25 March 2014	York City	1–0	Torquay United	Bootham Crescent
19:45 GMT	Hayhurst 11'; Davies (yellow card) 62'	Summary	Downes (yellow card) 19'	Attendance: 3,416; Referee: (England) Eddie Ilderton

29 March 2014	Southend United	1–0	Torquay United	Roots Hall
15:00 GMT	Sokolík (yellow card) 48'; White (yellow card) 49'; Eastwood 72'; Loza (yellow card) 79'	Summary	Cameron (yellow card) 33'; Stockley (yellow card) 50'; O'Connor (yellow card) 71'; Harding (yellow card) 73'	Attendance: 6,556; Referee: (England) Scott Mathieson

5 April 2014	Torquay United	0–1	Scunthorpe United	Plainmoor
15:00 GMT	Benyon (yellow card) 81'; Stockley (red card) 90+3'	Summary	Winnall 31' (pen.); Syers (yellow card) 44'	Attendance: 2,234; Referee: (England) Michael Bull

12 April 2014	Bristol Rovers	1–2	Torquay United	Memorial Stadium
15:00 BST	O'Toole (yellow card) 40'; Woodards (yellow card) 61' (goal) 90+5'; Clarke (yellow card) 87'	Report	Goodwin (yellow card) 37'; Coulthirst 62'; Mansell 75'	Attendance: 6,612; Referee: (England) Andy D'Urso

18 April 2014	Torquay United	0–1	Dagenham & Redbridge	Plainmoor
15:00 GMT		Report	Saah (yellow card) 5'; Elito (yellow card) 35' (goal) 67' (pen.); Turgott (yellow card) 80'	Attendance: 2,425; Referee: (England) Dean Whitestone

21 April 2014	Exeter City	1–2	Torquay United	St James Park
15:00 GMT	Bennett 17'; Woodman (yellow card) 71'	Report	Cameron 52'; Yeoman 56' (yellow card) 63'; Lathrope (yellow card) 83'	Attendance: 5,221; Referee: (England) Roger East

26 April 2014	Mansfield Town	1–3	Torquay United	Field Mill
15:00 GMT	Rhead (red card) 44'; Jennings 46' (yellow card) 68'	Report	Dempster 13' (o.g.); Yeoman 32'; Coulthirst 78'	Attendance: 3,389; Referee: (England) Gavin Ward

3 May 2014	Torquay United	0–3	Wycombe Wanderers	Plainmoor
15:00 GMT	Tonge (yellow card) 13'; O'Connor (yellow card) 41' (yellow-red card) 51'; Stockley (yellow card) 90'	Report	Wood 6'; Stewart (yellow card) 9'; Craig 42' (pen.); McClure 62'	Attendance: 3,149; Referee: (England) Craig Pawson

=== FA Cup ===
9 November 2013 First round	Torquay United	0–2	Rochdale	Plainmoor
15:00 GMT	Anthony O'Connor (yellow card) 13'		Lancashire (yellow card) 40'; Rafferty (yellow card) 58'; Hogan 85'; Vincenti 89'	Attendance: 1,976; Referee: Keith Hill

=== League Cup ===
6 August 2013 First round	Swindon Town	1–0	Torquay United	County Ground
19:45 BST	Williams 83'		N.Thompson (yellow card) 90'	Attendance: 5,662; Referee: Andy D’Urso

=== League Trophy ===
3 September 2013 First round	Torquay United	0–0 (3–5 p)	Portsmouth	Plainmoor
19:45 BST				Attendance: 1,951; Referee: Keith Hill
	Penalties
	Hawley (penalty scored); Ball (penalty scored); Mansell (penalty missed); Tonge (penalty scored)		Bradley (penalty scored); Wallace (penalty scored); Holmes (penalty scored); Craddock (penalty scored); Moutaouakil (penalty scored)

=== Devon St Luke's Bowl ===
17 September 2013 Second round	Torquay United	4–1	Ilfracombe Town	Plainmoor
19:45	Lathrope 56'; Sullivan 57' 75'; Cameron 81'		Paxton 55'	Referee: Aaron Reed

== Club statistics ==
=== First team appearances ===
As of 17 July 2013

No.	Pos	Nat	Player	Total		League Two		FA Cup		League Cup		League Trophy	
No.	Pos	Nat	Player	Apps	Goals	Apps	Goals	Apps	Goals	Apps	Goals	Apps	Goals
1	GK	(England) ENG	Michael Poke	14	0	14	0	0	0	0	0	0	0
2	DF	(England) ENG	Dale Tonge	39	0	36	0	1	0	1	0	1	0
3	DF	(England) ENG	Kevin Nicholson	31	0	28+1	0	1	0	1	0	0	0
4	DF	(Australia) AUS	Aaron Downes	35	4	30+2	4	1	0	1	0	1	0
5	DF	(England) ENG	Krystian Pearce	38	4	35	4	0+1	0	1	0	1	0
6	MF	(England) ENG	Damon Lathrope	24	0	19+4	0	0	0	0	0	1	0
7	MF	(England) ENG	Lee Mansell	46	2	41+2	2	1	0	1	0	0+1	0
8	MF	(England) ENG	Ben Harding	19	0	16+1	0	0	0	1	0	1	0
9	FW	(England) ENG	Karl Hawley	27	3	22+3	3	0	0	1	0	0+1	0
10	FW	(Wales) WAL	Billy Bodin	28	1	23+4	1	0	0	1	0	0	0
11	MF	(England) ENG	Courtney Cameron	27	1	15+9	1	0+1	0	0+1	0	1	0
12	MF	(England) ENG	Jordan Chapell	41	5	25+13	5	1	0	1	0	1	0
13	GK	(England) ENG	Martin Rice	35	0	32	0	1	0	1	0	1	0
14	FW	(England) ENG	Ashley Yeoman	9	3	2+7	3	0	0	0	0	0	0
15	MF	(England) ENG	Niall Thompson	4	0	1+2	0	0	0	0+1	0	0	0
16	FW	(England) ENG	Callum Ball	11	2	9	2	0	0	1	0	1	0
16	FW	(England) ENG	John Marquis	5	3	5	3	0	0	0	0	0	0
16	DF	(England) ENG	Shaun Cooper	5	3	5	3	0	0	0	0	0	0
17	MF	(England) ENG	Jak McCourt	12	0	10+1	0	1	0	0	0	0	0
17	FW	(Ireland) EIR	Shamir Goodwin	12	1	11+1	1	0	0	0	0	0	0
18	MF	(England) ENG	Labadie	10	1	10	1	0	0	0	0	0	0
19	FW	(England) ENG	Paul McCallum	6	3	4+1	3	1	0	0	0	0	0
19	FW	(England) ENG	Jayden Stockley	19	1	7+12	1	0	0	0	0	0	0
20	MF	(Wales) WAL	Nathan Craig	14	0	6+7	0	0+1	0	0	0	0	0
21	DF	(England) ENG	Thomas Cruise	22	0	18+3	0	0	0	0	0	1	0
22	MF	(England) ENG	Sam Chaney	0	0	0	0	0	0	0	0	0	0
22	FW	(Ireland) EIR	Aiden O'Brien	3	0	0+3	0	0	0	0	0	0	0
23	MF	(England) ENG	Ade Azeez	9	2	6+3	2	0	0	0	0	0	0
23	MF	(England) ENG	Danny Stevens	6	0	2+4	0	0	0	0	0	0	0
25	FW	(Nigeria) NGR	Enoch Showunmi	7	0	7	0	0	0	0	0	0	0
26	FW	(England) ENG	Elliot Benyon	40	2	23+14	2	1	0	0+1	0	1	0
27	FW	(Ireland) EIR	Conor Wilkinson	3	0	2+1	0	0	0	0	0	0	0
27	FW	(England) ENG	Shaq Coulthirst	6	2	5+1	2	0	0	0	0	0	0
29	DF	(Ireland) EIR	Anthony O'Connor	32	0	30+1	0	1	0	0	0	0	0
30	DF	(England) ENG	Kyrtis MacKenzie	0	0	0	0	0	0	0	0	0	0
30	DF	(England) ENG	Baily Cargill	5	0	5	0	0	0	0	0	0	0
31	FW	(England) ENG	Daniel Sullivan	5	0	0+4	0	0	0	0	0	0+1	0
32	DF	(England) ENG	Jake Hutchings	0	0	0	0	0	0	0	0	0	0
33	GK	(Northern Ireland) NIR	Conor Thompson	0	0	0	0	0	0	0	0	0	0
34	GK	(England) ENG	Daniel Lavercombe	0	0	0	0	0	0	0	0	0	0
36	MF	(France) FRA	Damien Mozika	12	0	9+3	0	0	0	0	0	0	0

Source: Torquay United

=== Top scorers ===
Place	Position	Nation	Number	Name	League Two	FA Cup	League Cup	League Trophy	Total
1	MF	(England)	12	Jordan Chapell	5	0	0	0	5
2	DF	(Australia)	4	Aaron Downes	4	0	0	0	4
=	DF	(England)	5	Krystian Pearce	4	0	0	0	4
3	FW	(England)	19	Paul McCallum	3	0	0	0	3
=	FW	(England)	16	John Marquis	3	0	0	0	3
=	FW	(England)	9	Karl Hawley	3	0	0	0	3
=	DF	(England)	27	Ashley Yeoman	3	0	0	0	3
4	FW	(England)	16	Callum Ball	2	0	0	0	2
=	MF	(England)	23	Ade Azeez	2	0	0	0	2
=	FW	(England)	26	Elliot Benyon	2	0	0	0	2
5	FW	(England)	19	Jayden Stockley	1	0	0	0	1
=	MF	(Wales)	10	Billy Bodin	1	0	0	0	1
=	FW	(England)	17	Shamir Goodwin	1	0	0	0	1
				TOTALS	30	0	0	0	30

Source: Torquay United

=== Disciplinary record ===
Number	Nation	Position	Name	League Two		FA Cup		League Cup		League Trophy		Total	
Number	Nation	Position	Name	Yellow card	Red card	Yellow card	Red card	Yellow card	Red card	Yellow card	Red card	Yellow card	Red card
2	(England)	DF	Dale Tonge	3	1	0	0	0	0	0	0	3	1
3	(England)	DF	Kevin Nicholson	1	0	0	0	0	0	0	0	1	0
4	(Australia)	DF	Aaron Downes	5	0	0	0	0	0	0	0	5	0
5	(England)	DF	Krystian Pearce	4	1	0	0	0	0	0	0	4	1
29	(Republic of Ireland)	DF	Anthony O'Connor	1	0	1	0	0	0	0	0	2	0
21	(England)	DF	Thomas Cruise	1	0	0	0	0	0	0	0	1	0
11	(England)	MF	Courtney Cameron	1	0	0	0	0	0	0	0	1	0
36	(France)	MF	Damien Mozika	1	0	0	0	0	0	0	0	1	0
7	(England)	MF	Lee Mansell	4	0	0	0	0	0	0	0	4	0
6	(England)	MF	Damon Lathrope	3	0	0	0	0	0	0	0	3	0
10	(Wales)	MF	Billy Bodin	1	0	0	0	0	0	0	0	1	0
8	(England)	MF	Ben Harding	1	0	0	0	0	0	0	0	1	0
15	(England)	MF	Niall Thompson	0	0	0	0	1	0	0	0	1	0
17	(England)	MF	Jak McCourt	2	0	0	0	0	0	0	0	2	0
18	(England)	MF	Joss Labadie	2	0	0	0	0	0	0	0	2	0
9	(England)	FW	Karl Hawley	1	0	0	0	0	0	0	0	1	0
16	(England)	FW	Callum Ball	1	0	0	0	0	0	0	0	1	0
19	(England)	FW	Paul McCallum	1	0	0	0	0	0	0	0	1	0
19	(England)	FW	Stockley	1	0	0	0	0	0	0	0	1	0
26	(England)	FW	Benyon	3	0	0	0	0	0	0	0	3	0
27	(Republic of Ireland)	FW	Conor Wilkinson	1	0	0	0	0	0	0	0	1	0
1	(England)	GK	Michael Poke	1	0	0	0	0	0	0	0	1	0
13	(England)	GK	Martin Rice	1	0	0	0	0	0	0	0	1	0
			TOTALS	40	2	1	0	1	0	0	0	42	2

Source: Torquay United

=== Transfers ===
==== In ====
Date	Nat.	Pos.	Name	From	Fee	References
1 July 2013	(England)	FW	Elliot Benyon	Southend United	Free Transfer	
1 July 2013	(England)	DF	Dale Tonge	Rotherham United	Free Transfer	
8 July 2013	(England)	MF	Jordan Chappell	Sheffield United	Free Transfer	
8 July 2013	(England)	MF	Courtney Cameron	Aston Villa	Free Transfer	
13 July 2013	(England)	MF	Ben Harding	Northampton Town	Free Transfer	
30 July 2013	(England)	DF	Krystian Pearce	Notts County	Free Transfer	
1 August 2013	(England)	FW	Karl Hawley	Scunthorpe United	Free Transfer	
21 October 2013	(France)	MF	Damien Mozika	Unattached	Free Transfer	
17 January 2014	(England)	DF	Shaun Cooper	Portsmouth	Free Transfer	
30 January 2014	(England)	MF	Danny Stevens	Unattached	Free Transfer	
31 January 2014	(England)	MF	Joss Labadie	Notts County	Free Transfer	

==== Loans in ====
Date	Nat.	Pos.	Name	From	Expiry date	References
1 August 2013	(England)	FW	Callum Ball	Derby County	1 October 2013	
26 September 2013	(England)	FW	Ade Azeez	Charlton Athletic	26 October 2013	
3 October 2013	(Republic of Ireland)	DF	Anthony O'Connor	Blackburn Rovers	30 May 2014	
11 October 2013	(England)	MF	Jak McCourt	Leicester City	11 November 2013	
22 October 2013	(England)	FW	Paul McCallum	West Ham United	23 November 2013	
25 November 2013	(England)	FW	John Marquis	Millwall	25 December 2013	
28 November 2013	(England)	FW	Jayden Stockley	A.F.C. Bournemouth	25 March 2013	
2 January 2014	(England)	MF	Joss Labadie	Notts County	2 February 2014	
10 January 2014	(England)	FW	Shamir Goodwin	Brighton & Hove Albion	10 March 2014	
30 January 2014	(Republic of Ireland)	FW	Aiden O'Brien	Millwall	28 February 2014	
31 January 2014	(England)	FW	Jack Rudge	Manchester United	28 February 2014	
14 February 2014	(England)	FW	Conor Wilkinson	Bolton Wanderers	14 March 2014	
28 February 2014	(Nigeria)	FW	Enoch Showunmi	Notts County	28 March 2014	
27 March 2014	(England)	DF	Baily Cargill	A.F.C. Bournemouth	30 May 2014	
28 March 2014	(England)	FW	Shaq Coulthirst	Tottenham Hotspur	30 May 2014	

==== Out ====
Date	Nat.	Pos.	Name	To	Fee	References
9 May 2013	(England)	DF	Joe Oastler	Aldershot Town	Free Transfer	
9 May 2013	(England)	DF	Daniel Leadbitter	Hereford United	Free Transfer	
9 May 2013	(England)	MF	Craig Easton	Released	Free Transfer	
9 May 2013	(England)	MF	Danny Stevens	Torquay United	Free Transfer	
9 May 2013	(England)	MF	Lloyd Macklin	Farnborough	Free Transfer	
9 May 2013	(England)	MF	Saul Halpin	Bideford	Free Transfer	
9 May 2013	(England)	ST	Karl Baker	Dartmouth FC	Free Transfer	
18 June 2013	(England)	ST	Brian Saah	Dagenham and Redbridge	Free Transfer	
26 June 2013	(Republic of Ireland)	MF	Ian Morris	Northampton Town FC	Free Transfer	
13 July 2013	(England)	FW	Rene Howe	Burton Albion	Free Transfer	
24 January 2014	(England)	DF	Kirtys MacKenzie	Unattached	Mutual Termination	
30 January 2014	(Northern Ireland)	GK	Conor Thompson	Newport County	Free Transfer	
2 February 2014	(England)	MF	Damien Mozika	Unattached	Free Transfer	

==== Loans out ====
Date	Nat.	Pos.	Name	To	Expiry date	References
27 September 2013	(England)	MF	Niall Thompson	Worcester City	27 October 2013	
2 October 2013	(England)	FW	Ashley Yeoman	Bideford	2 January 2014	
12 November 2013	(England)	DF	Kirtys MacKenzie	Gloucester City	14 January 2014	
12 November 2013	(England)	MF	Damon Lathrope	Hereford	2 January 2014	
14 December 2013	(England)	DF	Jake Hutchings	Grays Athletic	14 January 2014	
24 December 2013	(England)	GK	Conor Thompson	Swindon Supermarine	24 January 2014	
5 February 2014	(England)	FW	Daniel Sullivan	Bideford	5 April 2014	
14 February 2014	(England)	FW	Ashley Yeoman	Dorchester	14 April 2014	
14 February 2014	(Wales)	MF	Nathan Craig	Dorchester	14 April 2014	
