= Danny Sullivan (footballer) =

English footballer

Daniel Sullivan
Personal information
- Date of birth: 1 September 1994 (age 32)
- Place of birth: Plymouth, England
- Position: Forward

Team information
- Current team: Truro City

Youth career
- 2011–2013: Torquay United

Senior career*
Years	Team	Apps	(Gls)
2013–2015	Torquay United	5	(0)
2014	→ Bideford (loan)		
2014	→ Hereford United (loan)	9	(5)
2015–201?	Truro City	6	(3)
201?–2017	Bodmin Town	34	(16)
2017	Tavistock	?	(?)
2017–2022	Taunton Town	124	(42)
2022–	Truro City	0	(0)
- * Club domestic league appearances and goals as of 12:00, 11 July 2022 (UTC)

Daniel Michael C Sullivan (born 1 September 1994) is an English footballer who plays for Truro City as a forward. After rising through Torquay United's youth system, Sullivan made his senior debut in August 2013.

== Career ==
=== Youth team ===
Sullivan attended Ivybridge Community College and played in the same Plymouth Schools side as future Plymouth Argyle professionals Tyler Harvey and Matt Lecointe in 2009. He joined Argyle as a schoolboy but was released and signed for Torquay United on a two-year scholarship in July 2011. Sullivan made his debut for the youth team in August 2011 against Oxford United; the Herald Express claimed his performance "may well have caught the eye" of visiting scouts from Manchester United and Fulham. By November 2011, he was combining youth team duties with playing for Torquay's reserves.

He began the 2012–13 season in fine form after being converted from attacking midfield to lone striker by the club's Head of Youth Geoff Harrop, and he scored a hat-trick in United youth's first game, a 4–3 loss to Swindon Town.

After impressive displays over his two years with Torquay's youth team, Sullivan was awarded a professional contract in August 2012 by then-manager Martin Ling, who described the forward as "our youth team's best attacking player for some time." Sullivan was allocated the number 31 shirt and added to Torquay's first team squad for the 2012–13 season. Although Sullivan did not make any appearances for the first team and continued to play for Torquay's youth side, he was named as the club's Young Player of the Season for 2012–13.

=== Senior team ===
Alan Knill was appointed as the club's new manager in summer 2013 and gave Sullivan the chance to prove himself in Torquay's pre-season friendlies, giving the youngster playing time against Tiverton Town, Salisbury City and Yeovil Town. Sullivan duly scored in the latter game in a 2–0 win after coolly rounding Yeovil goalkeeper Marek Stech.

After impressive cameos in Torquay's pre-season fixtures, Sullivan was named as a substitute (having seemingly overtaken Ashley Yeoman in the striking roster) for the opening game of the season against AFC Wimbledon on 3 August. He made his senior debut a week later as a late substitute in the 1–1 draw at Morecambe, becoming the 999th player to play for Torquay since they joined the Football League in 1927. On 13 August, Sullivan scored twice in a 3–2 friendly win over Cheltenham Town – one with either foot – prompting Knill to admit, "When I watched Danny last year, I wasn't totally convinced, but he's earned our confidence this season."

The forward made his home debut in a 0–0 Football League Cup draw with Portsmouth on 3 September; Torquay lost 5–3 on penalties. Sullivan's second league appearance arrived four days later, coming off the bench in a 4–1 defeat at Fleetwood Town. A week later he replaced Jordan Chapell late in the 1–0 loss at Rochdale, but Sullivan had to wait until mid-November for his next appearance, again as a substitute in the 2–0 home reverse against Chesterfield.

On 5 February 2014, Sullivan joined Bideford on loan for the rest of the season. With Torquay relegated to the Conference, Sullivan made his first appearance of 2014–15 as a late replacement for Duane Ofori-Acheampong in United's 1–1 draw with Aldershot on 25 August 2014. He subsequently spent time on loan with Hereford United, but returned to Torquay when Hereford were liquidated.

=== Truro City ===
Sullivan left Torquay by mutual consent in January 2015, and signed for Southern League club Truro City on 16 January 2015. He made his Truro debut as a second-half substitute for Craig Duff in the 2–1 win at Hitchin Town the following day, and scored on his home debut in the 3–2 win over Redditch United on 20 January, when he again substituted Duff in the second half.

Sullivan then had a spell with Bodmin Town, before signing for Tavistock in June 2017. On 22 September 2017, Sullivan signed for Taunton Town. In his first season with Taunton, he was named the Supporters Player of the Year

In July 2022, after helping Taunton to promotion to the National League South, Sullivan returned to Truro City.
