= Dale Tonge =

English footballer

Personal information
- Date of birth: 7 May 1985 (age 41)
- Place of birth: Barnsley, England
- Positions: Right back; midfielder

Team information
- Current team: Huddersfield Town (assistant head coach)

Senior career*
Years	Team	Apps	(Gls)
2003–2007	Barnsley	45	(0)
2007	→ Gillingham (loan)	3	(0)
2007–2013	Rotherham United	163	(1)
2013–2015	Torquay United	53	(0)
2015	Chester	3	(0)
2015–2016	Stockport County	10	(0)
2016–2017	FC United of Manchester	40	(0)
Total		317	(1)
- * Club domestic league appearances and goals

Dale Tonge (born 7 May 1985) is an English former professional footballer who played as a full-back or midfielder.

== Career ==
Tonge came through the youth ranks with Barnsley and made his debut on 17 April 2004 against Brentford.

On 20 March 2007, it was announced that he had joined Gillingham on loan. He made his Gillingham debut in the 5–0 away defeat to Carlisle United on 24 March, and returned to Barnsley one month later.

He was released by Barnsley at the end of the 2006–07 season, On 25 May 2007, he signed for Rotherham United, on a two-year deal.

On 25 October 2008, he scored his first career goal in a 2–1 win versus Macclesfield Town.

On 2 May 2009, Tonge was shown his first ever red card for professional foul in a 1–0 defeat to Exeter on the final day of the season, making almost 50 appearances in the 2008–09 season.

Tonge's following season was plagued with injury. He broke a foot in late 2009 while only managing 24 appearances and also missing the chance to play at Wembley in the league two playoff final against Dagenham & Redbridge.

He agreed a new two-year contract with the club in June 2011.

On 2 May 2013, Tonge was released by Rotherham. He then signed for Torquay United on 2 July 2013, signed by ex-Rotherham manager Alan Knill. On 24 April 2015, Tonge was released by Torquay.

Tonge was on trial at Chester, before signing for them permanently. In 2016, he joined FC United of Manchester. He left the club in 2017.

== Coaching career ==
Tonge began his coaching career with Barnsley as Assistant Youth Development Phase Coach, before then becoming the Lead. In February 2019, he was promoted to first-team assistant manager, though he left the club in November 2019. In July 2021, he was appointed Professional Development Phase Coach at Scunthorpe United.

In March 2022, Tonge was appointed to the role of first-team coach at Peterborough United.

In June 2025, Tonge returned to former club Rotherham United as assistant manager after the club had agreed a compensation fee with Peterborough United. He departed the club in March 2026.

On 29 June 2026, he was added to the Huddersfield Town coaching staff, sharing the role of assistant head coach with Jon Stead.

== Career statistics ==
Appearances and goals by club, season and competition
Club	Season	League			FA Cup		League Cup		Other		Total	
Club	Season	Division	Apps	Goals	Apps	Goals	Apps	Goals	Apps	Goals	Apps	Goals
Barnsley	2003–04	Second Division	1	0	0	0	0	0	0	0	1	0
Barnsley	2004–05	League One	14	0	1	0	0	0	0	0	15	0
Barnsley	2005–06	League One	24	0	4	0	2	0	1 (Note: Appearance(s) in League One play-offs)	0	31	0
Barnsley	2006–07	Championship	6	0	0	0	2	0	0	0	8	0
Barnsley	Total		45	0	5	0	4	0	1	0	55	0
Gillingham (loan)	2006–07	League One	3	0	0	0	—		0	0	3	0
Rotherham United	2007–08	League Two	37	0	2	0	1	0	2 (Note: Appearance(s) in Football League Trophy)	0	42	0
Rotherham United	2008–09	League Two	39	1	2	0	2	0	5	1	48	2
Rotherham United	2009–10	League Two	21	0	1	0	2	0	1	0	25	0
Rotherham United	2010–11	League Two	23	0	0	0	0	0	0	0	23	0
Rotherham United	2011–12	League Two	32	0	2	0	1	0	1	0	36	0
Rotherham United	2012–13	League Two	11	0	0	0	0	0	0	0	11	0
Rotherham United	Total		163	1	7	0	6	0	9	1	185	2
Torquay United	2013–14	League Two	36	0	1	0	1	0	1	0	39	0
Torquay United	2014–15	Conference Premier	17	0	0	0	—		0	0	17	0
Torquay United	Total		53	0	1	0	1	0	1	0	56	0
Chester	2015–16	National League	3	0	0	0	—		0	0	3	0
Stockport County	2015–16	National League North	10	0	0	0	—		0	0	10	0
FC United of Manchester	2015–16	National League North	10	0	0	0	—		0	0	10	0
FC United of Manchester	2016–17	National League North	30	0	3	0	—		2 (Note: One appearance in FA Trophy, one appearance in Manchester Premier Cup)	0	35	0
FC United of Manchester	Total		40	0	3	0	—		2	0	45	0
Career total			317	1	16	0	11	0	13	1	357	2

== Honours ==
Barnsley

- Football League One play-offs: 2006

Rotherham United

- Football League Two second-place promotion: 2012–13

== Sources ==
- Dale Tonge at Soccerbase
