= Baily Cargill =

English footballer

Personal information
- Full name: Baily James Cargill
- Date of birth: 5 July 1995 (age 31)
- Place of birth: Winchester, England
- Height: 6 ft 2 1/2 in (1.89 m)
- Position: Defender

Team information
- Current team: Mansfield Town
- Number: 6

Youth career
- 2003–2006: Leicester City
- 2006–2008: Southampton
- 2008–2012: AFC Bournemouth

Senior career*
Years	Team	Apps	(Gls)
2012–2018	AFC Bournemouth	1	(0)
2012–2013	→ AFC Totton (loan)	26	(3)
2013–2014	→ Welling United (loan)	13	(0)
2013–2014	→ Torquay United (loan)	5	(0)
2016	→ Coventry City (loan)	5	(1)
2016	→ Gillingham (loan)	9	(1)
2017–2018	→ Fleetwood Town (loan)	11	(0)
2018	→ Partick Thistle (loan)	16	(0)
2018–2021	Milton Keynes Dons	52	(1)
2021–2023	Forest Green Rovers	81	(3)
2023–	Mansfield Town	86	(7)

International career
2014–2015	England U20	7	(1)
- * Club domestic league appearances and goals as of 26 January 2026

Baily James Cargill (born 5 July 1995) is an English professional footballer who plays as a defender for EFL League One club Mansfield Town. Cargill is a left footed centre back who can also play at full back.

== Club career ==
=== AFC Bournemouth ===
Born in Winchester, England, Cargill grew up as a Southampton fan and had a season ticket for the club. After spells at the academies of Leicester City and Southampton, Cargill joined AFC Bournemouth's youth ranks, which Cargill stated he joined the club's U13 academy and turned professional in 2012. After a loan spell with A.F.C. Totton and Welling, Cargill signed his first professional contract on a one-year contract in April 2013.

After making an impressive display in the pre-season friendly and his loan spell at Welling at the first half of the 2013–14 season, Cargill signed a two-year and a half contract, keeping him until 2016.

In effort of making a first team breakthrough ahead of the 2014–15 season, Cargill made his first senior appearance for Bournemouth on 12 August 2014 as a centre-back in a 2–0 League Cup win at Exeter City, and seven days later, on 19 August 2014, he was rewarded with a place on the bench in Bournemouth's 2–1 defeat to Nottingham Forest in the Championship. The defender retained his place for the next round of the League Cup on 26 August as Bournemouth beat Northampton Town 3–0, and also played in the third round 3–0 victory at Cardiff City on 23 September and the Cherries' 2–1 win over West Bromwich Albion in the fourth round on 28 October. His impressive display earned him a contract extension, keeping him until 2017. Then, Cargill started in the match against Liverpool in the fifth round of the Football League Cup, which Bournemouth lost 3–1. During the match, Cargill unintentionally made headlines after having a wig, which "fell off his head, and onto the pitch". One of his teammates, Harry Arter came to his defence after he believed that The Independent wrote an article about Cargill and accused the newspaper "bullying". Although the club were promoted to the Premier League next season, Cargill went on to make six appearances for the club.

In the 2015–16 season, Cargill, nevertheless, signed a contract extension with the club, keeping him until 2018. He appeared twice in the League Cup matches against Hartlepool United and Preston North End, both of the matches were a victory for the side. He also made two appearances in a FA Cup against Birmingham City and Portsmouth. Despite stating that he's ready to play in the Premier League, Cargill, however, yet to make a league appearance for the side, as he went on to make four appearances in all competitions.

After his loan spell at Gillingham, Cargill spent the rest of the season, fighting for his place in the first team, which saw him appear as an unused substitute. After four years since turning professional, Cargill made his league debut (and Premier League) debut for the club, where he came on as a substitute for Tyrone Mings in the 78th minute, in a 1–1 draw against Manchester United on 4 March 2017. A year later, he was released by Bournemouth at the end of the 2017–18 season.

==== Loan spells from Bournemouth ====
In November 2012 he was loaned to Southern League club AFC Totton on a one-month deal as part of a work experience arrangement. The loan was later extended until the end of the season. Cargill made his Totton debut in a 2–1 defeat to Forest Green Rovers in the FA Trophy. At Totton, Cargill cemented himself as a first-team regular, scoring 3 goals in 26 appearances and being voted the Fans' Player of the Season. Cargill later credited Totton with helping to make him the player he is today.

On 4 October 2013, Cargill joined Welling United on a one-month loan until 2 November 2013. Cargill made his Welling United debut the next day, in a 1–1 draw against Barnet. Cargill loan spell with Welling United was soon extended until 29 December 2013. Once again, Cargill was extended further until 22 January 2014. After his loan spell with Welling United came to an end with thirteen appearances, Cargill said his time at Welling United helped him with confidence.

Towards at the end of the 2013–14 season Chris Hargreaves, having recently moved from a coaching role at Bournemouth's academy to become manager of Torquay United, signed Cargill on loan to play at left-back. Cargill made his Torquay United debut, in a 2–1 win over Bristol Rovers. Cargill then provided assist for Ashley Yeoman, in a 2–1 win over Exeter City on 21 April 2014, in hope of survival relegation. However, the pair were unable to prevent the Gulls' relegation to the Conference, as Cargill made five appearances for the club.

On 1 February 2016, Cargill joined Coventry City on loan until the end of the season. He made his Coventry City debut, where he started the whole game, in a 1–1 draw against Port Vale on 5 February 2016. In a follow match, he scored his first goal for the club, coming in a 6–0 win over Bury on 13 February 2016. Cargill went on to make five appearances for Coventry City before returning to his parent club, due to picking up ankle injury during a 1–0 loss against Rochdale on 5 March 2016.

In August 2016, he joined Gillingham on loan until January. However, he spent two months away from the club, due to his fitness concern. It wasn't until on 8 November 2016 when he made his Gillingham debut, where he started the match, in a 2–0 win over West Bromwich Albion U23 in the EFL Trophy. He soon quickly became a first team regular with Gillingham, with his strong performance in the centre–back position. He then scored his first and only goal for Gillingham in a 1–1 draw with Peterborough United on 26 December 2016. Despite keen on extending his loan spell at Gillingham, Cargill, instead, returned to his parent club upon expiring. By the time of his departure, he went on to make ten appearances and scoring once in all competitions.

On 17 August 2017, Cargill joined Fleetwood Town on a season-long loan. He made his Fleetwood Town debut, where he came on as a substitute for Nathan Pond, in a 3–1 loss against Bristol Rovers on 26 August 2017. He scored his first goal for Fleetwood in an EFL Trophy tie against Leicester City Under-23s three days later on 29 August 2017. At Fleetwood Town, Cargill found himself fighting for the centre–back place in the first team. By the end of December, Cargill was soon dropped from the first team and never played for the side again. On 23 January 2018, Cargill was recalled by his parent club.

Cargill was loaned to Scottish Premiership club Partick Thistle on the same day he was recalled from his loan spell at Fleetwood Town. On the same day, he made his Partick Thistle debut, where he started the whole game, in a 2–1 loss against Celtic. Since joining the club, he quickly established himself in the starting eleven as a centre–back despite the club facing relegation. Although the club finished 11th place in the league, Partick Thistle still had to face Livingston in the Premiership play-offs to ensure their status; however, they were relegated to the Scottish Championship after losing 3–1 on aggregate. At the end of the 2017–18 season, Cargill went on to make nineteen appearances for the side.

=== Milton Keynes Dons ===
After being released by Bournemouth, Cargill joined relegated side Milton Keynes Dons on 1 August 2018. Upon joining the club, he said the move to Milton Keynes Dons was a "no brainer".

After initially suffering from injury, he made his Milton Keynes Dons' debut in the second round of the League Cup, in a 3–0 win over Charlton Athletic. A week later, on 25 August 2018, Cargill made his first start for the club, in a 3–0 win over Exeter City. Three days later, on 28 August 2018, he played against his former club, Bournemouth, in the second round of the League Cup and the match ended with Milton Keynes Dons losing 3–0. On 12 September 2020, Cargill scored his first goal for the club, an 88th-minute equaliser, in a 1–1 draw away to Doncaster Rovers.

=== Forest Green Rovers ===
He signed for League Two club Forest Green Rovers on 7 January 2021 on an 18-month deal.

=== Mansfield Town ===
He signed for League Two club Mansfield Town on 31 May 2023 on a 2-year deal.

On 7 May 2025 the club announced it had triggered an extension to the player's contract.

== International career ==
On 6 November 2014, Cargill was called into the England youth set up for the first time, being named in the England U20 squad for matches against Portugal and Canada. He started the Canada game and capped a dream debut by scoring a goal, which he described as the "best feeling". He was then called up to the Toulon Tournament in the following May. Cargill went on to make three appearances in the tournament, as England U20 finished fourth place.

In November 2015, Cargill was called up by England U21 for the first time but appeared as an unused substitute against Switzerland U21.

== Career statistics ==
As of 29 December 2020

Appearances and goals by club, season and competition
Club	Season	League			FA Cup		League Cup		Other		Total	
Club	Season	Division	Apps	Goals	Apps	Goals	Apps	Goals	Apps	Goals	Apps	Goals
AFC Totton (loan)	2012–13	Southern Premier	26	3	—		—		1 (Note: Appearances in FA Trophy)	0	27	3
Welling United (loan)	2013–14	Conference Premier	13	0	1	0	—		1	0	15	0
Torquay United (loan)	2013–14	League Two	5	0	—		—		—		5	0
AFC Bournemouth	2014–15	Championship	0	0	1	0	5	0	—		6	0
AFC Bournemouth	2015–16	Premier League	0	0	2	0	2	0	—		4	0
AFC Bournemouth	2016–17	Premier League	1	0	0	0	0	0	—		1	0
AFC Bournemouth	Total		1	0	3	0	7	0	0	0	11	0
Coventry City (loan)	2015–16	League One	5	1	—		—		—		5	1
Gillingham (loan)	2016–17	League One	9	1	0	0	0	0	1 (Note: Appearances in the EFL Trophy)	0	10	1
Fleetwood Town (loan)	2017–18	League One	11	0	2	0	0	0	5	1	18	1
Partick Thistle (loan)	2017–18	Scottish Premiership	16	0	1	0	—		2 (Note: Appearances in Scottish Premiership play-offs)	0	18	0
Milton Keynes Dons	2018–19	League Two	29	0	1	0	2	0	2	0	34	0
Milton Keynes Dons	2019–20	League One	12	0	0	0	1	0	4	0	17	0
Milton Keynes Dons	2020–21	League One	11	1	1	0	1	0	4	0	17	1
Milton Keynes Dons	Total		52	1	2	0	4	0	10	0	68	1
Forest Green Rovers	2020–21	League Two	23	2	—		—		2	0	25	2
Forest Green Rovers	2021–22	League Two	36	0	0	0	1	0	2	0	39	0
Forest Green Rovers	2022–23	League One	22	1	3	0	2	0	3	1	30	2
Forest Green Rovers	Total		81	3	3	0	3	0	7	1	94	4
Career total			219	9	12	0	14	0	27	2	272	11

== Honours ==
Milton Keynes Dons

- EFL League Two third-place promotion: 2018–19

Forest Green Rovers

- EFL League Two: 2021–22

Mansfield Town

- EFL League Two third-place promotion: 2023–24
