= 2013–14 Football League Two =

Football League Two
- Season: 2013–14
- Champions: Chesterfield (4th divisional title)
- Promoted: Chesterfield; Scunthorpe United; Rochdale; Fleetwood Town
- Relegated: Bristol Rovers; Torquay United
- Matches: 552
- Goals: 1,291 (2.34 per match)
- Top goalscorer: 23 – Sam Winnall (Scunthorpe United)
- Biggest home win: Plymouth Argyle 5–0 Morecambe
- Biggest away win: Fleetwood Town 0–4 Plymouth Argyle; Rochdale 0–4 Scunthorpe United; Plymouth Argyle 0–4 York City; Scunthorpe United 0-4 Exeter City
- Highest scoring: 9 goals Fleetwood Town 5–4 Mansfield Town
- Longest winning run: 6 games York City
- Longest unbeaten run: 28 games Scunthorpe United
- Longest winless run: 13 games Mansfield Town
- Longest losing run: 6 games Accrington Stanley; Hartlepool United; Mansfield Town
- Highest attendance: 18,181 (Portsmouth vs Oxford United, 3 August 2013)
- Lowest attendance: 1,101 (Accrington Stanley vs Bristol Rovers, 22 October 2013)
- Average attendance: 4,352

The 2013–14 Football League Two (referred to as Sky Bet League Two for sponsorship reasons) is the tenth season of the league under its current title and nineteenth season under its current league division format. The season began on 3 August 2013 and finished on 3 May 2014 with all matches that day kicking off simultaneously.

Of the 24 teams which will participate, eighteen of these remain following the 2012–13 Football League Two. They will be joined by four teams from 2012–13 Football League One, and two teams from the 2012–13 Football Conference.

== Changes from last season ==
=== Team changes ===
The following teams changed division at the end of the 2012–13 season.

==== To League Two ====
Promoted from Conference National

- Mansfield Town
- Newport County

Relegated from League One

- Bury
- Hartlepool United
- Portsmouth
- Scunthorpe United

==== From League Two ====
Relegated to Conference National

- Barnet
- Aldershot Town

Promoted to League One

- Gillingham
- Rotherham United
- Port Vale
- Bradford City

== Team overview ==
=== Stadia and locations ===
Locations of League Two 2013–14 teams

Team	Location	Stadium	Capacity
Accrington Stanley	Accrington	Crown Ground	5,057
AFC Wimbledon	London (Kingston upon Thames)	The Cherry Red Records Stadium	4,850
Bristol Rovers	Bristol	Memorial Stadium	12,011
Burton Albion	Burton upon Trent	Pirelli Stadium	6,912
Bury	Bury	Gigg Lane	11,840
Cheltenham Town	Cheltenham	Whaddon Road	7,066
Chesterfield	Chesterfield	Proact Stadium	10,504
Dagenham & Redbridge	London (Dagenham)	Victoria Road	6,078
Exeter City	Exeter	St James Park	8,830
Fleetwood Town	Fleetwood	Highbury Stadium	5,094
Hartlepool United	Hartlepool	Victoria Park	8,240
Mansfield Town	Mansfield	One Call Stadium	10,000
Morecambe	Morecambe	Globe Arena	6,476
Newport County	Newport	Rodney Parade	7,850 (Note: Newport County's safety certificate at the time allowed a maximum attendance of 7,850 for football matches)
Northampton Town	Northampton	Sixfields Stadium	7,653
Oxford United	Oxford	Kassam Stadium	12,500
Plymouth Argyle	Plymouth	Home Park	16,388
Portsmouth	Portsmouth	Fratton Park	20,224
Rochdale	Rochdale	Spotland Stadium	10,249
Scunthorpe United	Scunthorpe	Glanford Park	9,088
Southend United	Southend-on-Sea	Roots Hall	11,840
Torquay United	Torquay	Plainmoor	6,104
Wycombe Wanderers	High Wycombe	Adams Park	10,284
York City	York	Bootham Crescent	7,872

=== Personnel and sponsoring ===
Team	Manager	Chairman	Team captain	Kit maker	Sponsor
Accrington Stanley	(England) James Beattie	(England) Peter Marsden	(England) Dean Winnard	Samurai Sportswear	Clever Boxes
AFC Wimbledon	(England) Neal Ardley	(England) Erik Samuelson	(Republic of Ireland) Alan Bennett	Tempest Sports	Football Manager (H); Sports Interactive (A)
Bristol Rovers	(England) Darrell Clarke	(England) Nick Higgs	(England) Tom Parkes	Erreà	Eurocams (H); Highspec Travel Services (A)
Burton Albion	(England) Gary Rowett	(England) Ben Robinson	(Scotland) Zander Diamond	TAG	Anvil Hire Ltd (H); Mr Cropper (A)
Bury	(England) David Flitcroft	(England) Stewart Day	(Wales) Gareth Roberts	Surridge	Bury Council
Cheltenham Town	(England) Mark Yates	(England) Paul Baker	(England) Russell Penn	Erreà	Mira Showers
Chesterfield	(England) Paul Cook	(England) Dave Allen	(England) Ian Evatt	Puma	Napit (H); Electric Safe (A)
Dagenham & Redbridge	(England) Wayne Burnett	(England) Dave Andrews	(England) Abu Ogogo	Sondico	West & Coe Funeral Directors
Exeter City	(England) Paul Tisdale	(England) Edward Chorlton	(England) Danny Coles	Joma	Flybe
Fleetwood Town	(Scotland) Graham Alexander	(England) Andy Pilley	(England) Mark Roberts	Puma	BES Commercial Gas (H); Commercial Power (A)
Hartlepool United	(England) Colin Cooper	(England) Ken Hodcroft	(England) Antony Sweeney	Nike	Dove Energy
Mansfield Town	(England) Paul Cox	(England) John Radford	(England) George Pilkington	Surridge	One Call Insurance
Morecambe	(England) Jim Bentley	(England) Peter McGuigan	(England) Mark Hughes	Fila	Blacks
Newport County	(England) Justin Edinburgh	(England) Les Scadding	(Wales) David Pipe	Macron	32Red
Northampton Town	(England) Chris Wilder	(England) David Cardoza	(England) Kelvin Langmead	Erreà	University of Northampton
Oxford United	(England) Michael Appleton	(England) Ian Lenagan	(England) Jake Wright	Nike	Animalates (H); Isinglass Consulting (A)
Plymouth Argyle	(Republic of Ireland) John Sheridan	(England) James Brent	(Republic of Ireland) Conor Hourihane	Puma	Bond Timber
Portsmouth	(England) Andy Awford	(England) Iain McInnes	(Austria) Johannes Ertl	Sondico	Jobsite.co.uk
Rochdale	(England) Keith Hill	(England) Chris Dunphy	(England) Peter Cavanagh	Fila	Crown Oil
Scunthorpe United	(England) Russ Wilcox	(England) Peter Swann	(Republic of Ireland) Michael Collins	Nike	Rainham Steel
Southend United	(England) Phil Brown	(England) Ron Martin	(England) John White	Nike	InsureandGo
Torquay United	(England) Chris Hargreaves	(England) Thea Bristow	(England) Lee Mansell	Sondico	WTS
Wycombe Wanderers	(England) Gareth Ainsworth	(England) Ivor Beeks MBE	(England) Stuart Lewis	Kukri	Samsung (H); FIFA 14 (A)
York City	(Northern Ireland) Nigel Worthington	(England) Jason McGill	(England) Russell Penn	Nike	benenden health

==== Managerial changes ====
Team	Outgoing manager	Manner of departure	Date of vacancy	Position in table	Incoming manager	Date of appointment
Bury	(England) Kevin Blackwell	Sacked	14 October 2013	21st	(England) David Flitcroft	9 December 2013
Scunthorpe United	(England) Brian Laws	Sacked	20 November 2013	12th	(England) Russ Wilcox	24 December 2013
Portsmouth	(England) Guy Whittingham	Sacked	25 November 2013	18th	(England) Richie Barker	9 December 2013
Northampton Town	(England) Aidy Boothroyd	Sacked	21 December 2013	24th	(England) Chris Wilder	27 January 2014
Torquay United	(Wales) Alan Knill	Sacked	2 January 2014	23rd	(England) Chris Hargreaves	6 January 2014
Oxford United	(England) Chris Wilder	Signed by Northampton Town	25 January 2014	6th	(Republic of Ireland) Gary Waddock	22 March 2014
Portsmouth	(England) Richie Barker	Sacked	27 March 2014	22nd	(England) Andy Awford	1 May 2014
Bristol Rovers	(England) John Ward	Appointed as Director of Football	28 March 2014	20th	(England) Darrell Clarke	28 March 2014
Oxford United	(Republic of Ireland) Gary Waddock	Sacked	4 July 2014	8th	(England) Michael Appleton	4 July 2014

== League table ==
Pos	Team	Pld	W	D	L	GF	GA	GD	Pts	Promotion, qualification or relegation
1	Chesterfield (C, P)	46	23	15	8	71	40	+31	84	Promotion to Football League One
2	Scunthorpe United (P)	46	20	21	5	68	44	+24	81	Promotion to Football League One
3	Rochdale (P)	46	24	9	13	69	48	+21	81	Promotion to Football League One
4	Fleetwood Town (O, P)	46	22	10	14	66	52	+14	76	Qualification for League Two play-offs
5	Southend United	46	19	15	12	56	39	+17	72	Qualification for League Two play-offs
6	Burton Albion	46	19	15	12	47	42	+5	72	Qualification for League Two play-offs
7	York City	46	18	17	11	52	41	+11	71	Qualification for League Two play-offs
8	Oxford United	46	16	14	16	53	50	+3	62	
9	Dagenham & Redbridge	46	15	15	16	53	59	−6	60	
10	Plymouth Argyle	46	16	12	18	51	58	−7	60	
11	Mansfield Town	46	15	15	16	49	58	−9	60	
12	Bury	46	13	20	13	59	51	+8	59	
13	Portsmouth	46	14	17	15	56	66	−10	59	
14	Newport County	46	14	16	16	56	59	−3	58	
15	Accrington Stanley	46	14	15	17	54	56	−2	57	
16	Exeter City	46	14	13	19	54	57	−3	55	
17	Cheltenham Town	46	13	16	17	53	63	−10	55	
18	Morecambe	46	13	15	18	52	64	−12	54	
19	Hartlepool United	46	14	11	21	50	56	−6	53	
20	AFC Wimbledon	46	14	14	18	49	57	−8	53 (Note: On 28 April AFC Wimbledon were deducted 3 points for fielding an ineligible player.)	
21	Northampton Town	46	13	14	19	42	57	−15	53	
22	Wycombe Wanderers	46	12	14	20	46	54	−8	50	
23	Bristol Rovers (R)	46	12	14	20	43	54	−11	50	Relegation to the Conference Premier
24	Torquay United (R)	46	12	9	25	42	66	−24	45	Relegation to the Conference Premier

Updated to match(es) played on 3 May 2014. Source: BBC Sport
Rules for classification: 1) Points; 2) Goal difference; 3) Number of goals scored
(C) Champions; (O) Play-off winners; (P) Promoted; (R) Relegated

== Play-offs ==
Semifinals
4	Fleetwood Town	1	0	1
7	York City	0	0	0
5	Southend United	0	2	2
6	Burton Albion	1	2	3

Final
4	Fleetwood Town	1
6	Burton Albion	0

== Results ==
Home \ Away	ACC	WIM	BRR	BRT	BRY	CHL	CHF	D&R	EXE	FLE	HAR	MAN	MOR	NPC	NOR	OXF	PLY	POR	ROC	SCU	STD	TOR	WYC	YOR
Accrington Stanley		3–2	2–1	0–1	0–0	0–1	3–1	1–2	2–3	2–0	0–0	1–1	5–1	3–3	0–1	0–0	1–1	2–2	1–2	2–3	1–1	2–1	1–1	1–1
AFC Wimbledon	1–1		0–0	3–1	0–1	4–3	1–1	1–1	2–1	2–0	2–1	0–0	0–3	2–2	0–2	0–2	1–1	4–0	0–3	3–2	0–1	0–2	1–0	0–1
Bristol Rovers	0–1	3–0		2–0	1–1	1–0	0–0	1–2	2–1	1–3	2–2	0–1	1–0	3–1	1–0	1–1	2–1	2–0	1–2	0–0	0–0	1–2	0–1	3–2
Burton Albion	2–1	1–1	1–0		2–2	2–1	0–2	1–1	1–1	2–4	3–0	1–0	0–1	1–0	1–0	0–2	1–0	1–2	1–0	2–2	0–1	2–0	1–0	1–1
Bury	3–0	1–1	2–1	0–0		4–1	0–2	1–1	2–0	2–2	1–0	0–0	0–2	0–0	1–1	1–1	4–0	4–4	0–0	2–2	1–1	1–3	1–0	2–1
Cheltenham Town	1–2	1–0	0–0	2–2	2–1		1–4	2–3	1–0	1–2	2–2	1–2	3–0	0–0	1–1	2–2	1–3	2–2	1–2	0–2	1–2	1–0	1–1	2–2
Chesterfield	1–0	2–0	3–1	0–2	4–0	2–0		1–1	1–1	2–1	1–1	0–1	1–0	1–1	0–0	3–0	2–0	0–0	2–2	1–1	2–1	3–1	2–0	2–2
Dagenham & Redbridge	0–0	1–0	2–0	2–0	2–1	1–2	0–1		1–1	0–1	0–2	0–0	1–1	1–1	0–3	1–0	1–2	1–4	3–1	3–3	1–1	0–1	2–0	2–0
Exeter City	0–1	2–0	2–1	0–1	2–2	1–1	0–2	2–2		3–0	0–3	0–1	1–1	0–2	0–1	0–0	3–1	1–1	0–1	2–0	0–2	1–2	0–1	2–1
Fleetwood Town	3–1	0–0	3–1	2–3	2–1	0–2	1–1	3–1	1–2		2–0	5–4	2–2	4–1	2–0	1–1	0–4	3–1	0–0	0–1	1–1	4–1	1–0	1–2
Hartlepool United	2–1	3–1	4–0	1–1	0–3	0–1	1–2	2–1	0–2	0–1		2–4	2–1	3–0	2–0	1–3	1–0	0–0	0–3	0–0	0–1	3–0	1–2	2–0
Mansfield Town	2–3	1–0	1–1	0–0	1–4	0–2	0–0	3–0	0–0	1–0	1–4		1–2	2–1	3–0	1–3	0–1	2–2	3–0	0–2	2–1	1–3	2–2	0–1
Morecambe	1–2	1–1	2–1	0–1	0–0	0–1	4–3	2–2	2–0	1–0	1–2	0–1		4–1	1–1	1–1	2–1	2–2	1–2	1–1	2–1	1–1	1–1	0–0
Newport County	4–1	1–2	1–0	1–1	0–0	0–1	3–2	1–2	1–1	0–0	2–0	1–1	2–3		1–2	3–2	1–2	1–2	2–1	2–2	3–1	2–1	2–0	3–0
Northampton Town	1–0	2–2	0–0	1–0	0–3	1–1	1–3	2–2	1–2	1–0	2–0	1–1	0–0	3–1		3–1	0–2	0–1	0–3	1–1	2–1	1–2	1–4	0–2
Oxford United	1–2	2–1	0–1	1–2	2–1	1–1	0–1	2–1	0–0	0–2	1–0	3–0	3–0	0–0	2–0		2–3	0–0	1–1	0–2	0–2	1–0	2–2	0–1
Plymouth Argyle	0–0	1–2	1–0	0–1	2–1	1–1	2–1	2–1	1–2	0–2	1–1	1–1	5–0	0–0	1–0	0–2		1–1	1–0	0–2	1–1	2–0	0–3	0–4
Portsmouth	1–0	1–0	3–2	0–0	1–0	0–0	0–2	1–0	3–2	0–1	1–0	1–1	3–0	0–2	0–0	1–4	3–3		3–0	1–2	1–2	0–1	2–2	0–1
Rochdale	2–1	1–2	2–0	1–1	1–0	2–0	2–2	0–1	3–1	1–2	3–0	3–0	2–1	3–0	3–2	3–0	3–0	3–0		0–4	0–3	1–0	3–2	0–0
Scunthorpe United	0–2	0–0	1–1	1–0	2–2	2–0	1–1	1–1	0–4	0–0	1–0	2–0	2–0	1–1	1–1	1–0	1–0	5–1	3–0		2–2	3–1	0–0	2–2
Southend United	1–0	0–1	1–1	1–0	0–0	1–1	3–0	0–1	2–3	2–0	1–1	3–0	1–3	0–0	2–0	3–0	1–0	2–1	1–1	0–1		1–0	1–1	2–1
Torquay United	0–1	1–1	1–1	1–1	2–1	4–2	0–2	0–1	1–3	0–1	0–0	0–0	1–1	0–1	1–2	1–3	1–1	1–1	2–1	0–1	1–0		0–3	0–3
Wycombe Wanderers	0–0	0–3	1–2	1–2	1–2	1–2	1–0	2–0	1–1	1–1	2–1	0–1	1–0	0–1	1–1	0–1	0–1	0–1	0–2	1–1	2–1	3–2		1–1
York City	1–1	0–2	0–0	0–0	1–0	0–0	0–2	3–1	2–1	0–2	0–0	1–2	1–0	1–0	1–0	0–0	1–1	4–2	0–0	4–1	0–0	1–0	2–0	

Updated to match(es) played on 3 May 2014. Source:
Legend: Blue = home team win; Yellow = draw; Red = away team win.

== Season statistics ==
=== Top scorers ===
As of 26 April 2014.

Rank	Player	Club	Goals
1	(England) Sam Winnall	Scunthorpe United	23
2	(Republic of Ireland) Scott Hogan	Rochdale	17
2	(England) Reuben Reid	Plymouth Argyle	17
4	(England) Byron Harrison	Cheltenham Town	13
4	(England) Luke James	Hartlepool United	13
4	(Republic of Ireland) Rhys Murphy	Dagenham & Redbridge	13
4	(Republic of Ireland) John-Joe O'Toole	Bristol Rovers	13
4	(England) Antoni Sarcevic	Fleetwood Town	13
9	(Republic of Ireland) Barry Corr	Southend United	12
9	(Northern Ireland) Billy Kee	Burton Albion	12
9	(England) Chris Zebroski	Newport County	12

=== Scoring ===
- First goal of the season: Mark Roberts for Fleetwood Town against Dagenham & Redbridge (3 August 2013)
- Fastest goal of the season: 17 seconds, Jordan Chapell for Torquay United against Portsmouth (26 October 2013)
- Largest winning margin: 5 goals
  - Plymouth Argyle 5–0 Morecambe (1 March 2014)
- Highest scoring game: 9 goals
  - Fleetwood Town 5–4 Mansfield Town (23 November 2013)
- Most goals scored in a match by a single team: 5 goals
  - Fleetwood Town 5–4 Mansfield Town (23 November 2013)
  - Plymouth Argyle 5–0 Morecambe (1 March 2014)
  - Accrington Stanley 5–1 Morecambe (14 March 2014)
- Most goals scored in a match by a losing team: 4 goals
  - Fleetwood Town 5–4 Mansfield Town (23 November 2013)
