= Ade Azeez =

English footballer (born 1994)

- Azeez in 2026

Personal information
- Full name: Adebayo Linford Kazim Azeez
- Date of birth: 8 January 1994 (age 32)
- Place of birth: Bromley, London, England
- Height: 6 ft 1 in (1.85 m)
- Position: Forward

Team information
- Current team: Welling United

Youth career
- –2008: Rivercray
- 2008–2012: Charlton Athletic

Senior career*
Years	Team	Apps	(Gls)
2012–2014	Charlton Athletic	0	(0)
2012–2013	→ Wycombe Wanderers (loan)	4	(0)
2013	→ Leyton Orient (loan)	1	(0)
2013–2014	→ Torquay United (loan)	9	(2)
2014	→ Dagenham & Redbridge (loan)	15	(3)
2014–2016	AFC Wimbledon	85	(12)
2016–2017	Partick Thistle	38	(2)
2017–2019	Cambridge United	39	(2)
2018	→ Dover Athletic (loan)	12	(1)
2019–2020	Newport County	12	(1)
2020	→ Torquay United (loan)	3	(1)
2020–2021	Dover Athletic	13	(2)
2021–2022	Dartford	36	(11)
2022–2023	Welling United	42	(15)
2023–2025	Billericay Town	26	(3)
2025	→ Sittingbourne (loan)	15	(5)
2025–2026	Hemel Hempstead Town	15	(0)
2026–	Welling United	3	(1)

International career^{‡}
2012	England U19	3	(0)
- * Club domestic league appearances and goals as of 22:10, 19 January 2026 (UTC) ‡ National team caps and goals as of 22:10, 19 January 2026 (UTC)

Adebayo Linford Kazim "Ade" Azeez(born 8 January 1994) is an English professional footballer who plays as a striker for Isthmian League Premier Division club Welling United.

Azeez began his career with Charlton Athletic, spending time on loan to Wycombe Wanderers, Leyton Orient, Torquay United and Dagenham & Redbridge before being released in 2014. He then played for AFC Wimbledon, making 85 appearances, before signing for Partick Thistle in 2016. After short spells with Cambridge United and Newport County, Azeez re-signed with former loan club Dover Athletic and continues to play non-league football.

Azeez has represented the England under-19 team.

== Early life ==
Azeez was born in Sidcup, and attended Coopers Technology College in Chislehurst both in South East London. As a youngster he was a promising gymnast, and trained at Bromley Valley Gymnastics Centre before leaving to concentrate on football. He moved to his local club, Rivercray and it was from here that he was spotted as a talent by Charlton Athletic and signed a scholarships in 2010. Azeez is of Nigerian descent. Ade Azeez has a son named Ade Junior, aged 4 years old with his partner who he met when they were both 15 years old.

== Club career ==
=== Charlton Athletic ===
Azeez joined Charlton Athletic at the age of 14 and he progressed through the ranks before signing a professional contract in the summer of 2011. On 22 November 2012, Azeez was loaned to League Two side Wycombe Wanderers until January 2013. Charlton's Manager Chris Powell believed it was a good move for Azeez and that he could learn from the experience. He made his professional debut two days later, coming on as a 76th-minute substitute to replace Joel Grant in a 3–0 win against Burton Albion. However, as he made his first start in the quarter final of the Southern Section of Football League Trophy against Yeovil Town, which they lost 2–0, Azeez sustained a hamstring injury in the 25th minute and had to come off.

Soon after Charlton rejected an offer to have his loan with Wycombe extended, Azeez made his debut for Charlton Athletic in the 1–0 home defeat to Huddersfield Town in the FA cup, replacing Bradley Wright-Phillips in the 78th minute. After making his debut, Azeez said making his debut was something that he wanted to do at the club and was thankful to Powell for giving him the opportunity.

On 18 January 2013 he signed on loan for Leyton Orient, and made his only appearance for the club in a 2–0 away defeat at Doncaster Rovers the following day. Azeez's loan spell with Leyton Orient came to an end on 18 February 2013.

Azeez received a number 38 shirt for the 2013–14 season. On 26 September 2013, Azeez joined League Two side Torquay United on a one-month youth loan. Two days later he scored his first professional goal after coming on for Torquay in their 2–1 defeat to Newport County. A week later, on 14 October 2013, Azeez scored again, in a 3–2 loss against Wycombe Wanderers. Having scored twice in six games, Azeez had his loan spell with Torquay United extended for a further month. After this extension Azeez returned to Charlton.

On 8 February 2014 he signed for Dagenham & Redbridge on a one-month youth loan. Two days later, on 10 February 2014, Azeez made his debut for the club, in a 2–0 loss against Hartlepool United. On 10 March 2014, Azeez extended his loan with the "Daggers" for a further month, until 5 April 2014. Days after extending his deal, on 11 March 2014, he scored his first goal for the club and then scored another, in a 2–1 win over Bristol Rovers. His loan was extended even further on 9 April 2014, this time until the end of the 2013–14 season. In the last game of the season Azeez scored his third goal for the club in a 3–2 win over Cheltenham Town.

On 22 May 2014 he was released from Charlton Athletic in the summer upon expiry of his contract.

=== AFC Wimbledon ===
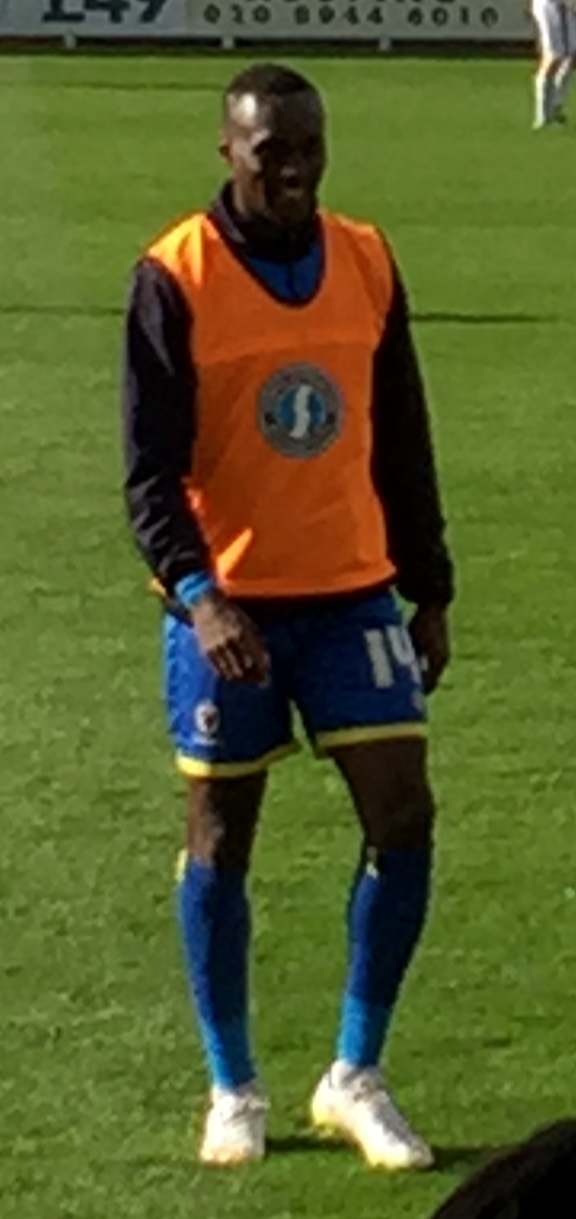
Azeez as a substitute for AFC Wimbledon in September 2015.

On 26 June 2014 Azeez signed with League Two side AFC Wimbledon on a free transfer. Upon joining the club, Azeez was given the number fourteen shirt ahead of the new season.

After being an unused substitute in the opening game of the season, Azeez made his Wimbledon debut against Luton Town, where he came on for Matt Tubbs in a 1–0 victory. Azeez scored his first Wimbledon goal on 30 August 2014, in a 3–2 defeat against Stevenage, followed up scoring in the next game against Carlisle United. Azeez scored two months later on 7 October 2014 against Milton Keynes Dons in a 3–2 victory. Two months later on 28 December 2014, Azeez scored twice, in a 4–1 win over Exeter City. Azeez then scored, in a 2–1 win over Accrington Stanley on 24 January 2015. His seventh goal of the season came on 14 April 2015, in a 1–1 draw against Plymouth Argyle. Spending much of the season as an impact substitute, he quickly became popular with the club's fans, with his pace often panicking tiring defenders. Azeez was part of the AFC Wimbledon side that won the 2016 League 2 play off final. His run winning the injury time penalty that confirmed the result.

=== Partick Thistle ===
Ade Azeez signed for Scottish Premiership side Partick Thistle on 15 June 2016. He was Alan Archibald's first summer signing of the 2016–17 season. Azeez scored his first goal for Thistle in a 4–1 away win over Stenhousemuir in the Scottish League Cup. Azeez scored his first league goal for Thistle in a 2–0 away win against Dundee at Dens Park, Azeez opened the scoring with a first half header. Azeez scored his second league goal of the season during a shock 1–1 draw with champions Celtic at Celtic Park. In all competitions, Azeez made 46 appearances for the Jags scoring three goals.

=== Cambridge United ===
On 5 July 2017 Partick Thistle accepted an undisclosed fee for Azeez from Cambridge United. On 23 February 2018 Azeez joined Dover Athletic on loan. The loan was subsequently extended to the end of the 2017–18 season.

=== Newport County ===
On 31 January 2019 Azeez joined Newport County on a two-year deal for an undisclosed fee. He made his Newport debut on 23 February 2019 in the 2–0 League Two defeat against Milton Keynes Dons as a second half substitute. He scored his first goal for Newport on 2 March 2019 in the 2–0 win against Carlisle United in League Two. He was part of the team that reached the League Two playoff final at Wembley Stadium on 25 May 2019, although he was an unused substitute in the final. He was injured in July 2019, and ruled out for 6 months. On 11 February 2020, having recovered from the injury, Azeez joined Torquay United on loan until the end of the 2019–20 season. On 14 September 2020 his contract at Newport was terminated by mutual consent.

=== Dover Athletic ===
On 3 October 2020, Azeez joined National League side Dover Athletic, where he had previously spent time on loan, being one of four new signings on the day of the new season commencement. He made his debut later that day in an opening day 1-0 victory over Notts County. On 27 October 2020, he scored his first goal back at the club with the winner in a 3–2 victory over Eastleigh. Following's Dover's decision to not play any more matches in the 2020–21 season, made in late January, and subsequent null and voiding of all results, on 5 May 2021 it was announced that Azeez was out of contract and had left the club.

=== Dartford ===
On 16 June 2021, Azeez joined National League South side Dartford ahead of the 2021–22 season. After scoring seven goals at a rate of one every 88 minutes, Azeez was awarded the league's Player-of-the-Month award for August/September 2021.

On 27 May 2022, Azeez announced he would leave the club following the end of the 2021–22 season.

=== Welling United ===
On 31 May 2022, Azeez joined National League South side Welling United ahead of the 2022–23 season.

=== Billericay Town ===
In May 2023, Azeez signed for Isthmian League Premier Division club Billericay Town.

In February 2025, he joined Isthmian League South East Division side Sittingbourne on an initial one-month loan, later extended until the end of the season.

=== Hemel Hempstead Town ===
On 30 May 2025, Azeez joined National League South side Hemel Hempstead Town.

=== Welling United ===
In January 2026, Azeez returned to Isthmian League Premier Division club Welling United.

== International career ==
On 19 September 2012, Azeez earned a call-up by England under-19. Azeez made his debut for England on 28 September 2013, where he set up the third goal, as they beat Faroe Islands under-19, 6–0. Azeez added two more caps for England under-19 against Ukraine under-19 on 1 October 2012 and another against Finland under-19, where he assisted the only goal in the game on 13 November 2012.

== Career statistics ==
As of match played 19 January 2026

Appearances and goals by club, season and competition
Club	Season	League			National Cup		League Cup		Other		Total	
Club	Season	Division	Apps	Goals	Apps	Goals	Apps	Goals	Apps	Goals	Apps	Goals
Charlton Athletic	2012–13	Championship	0	0	1	0	0	0	—		1	0
Wycombe Wanderers (loan)	2012–13	League Two	4	0	—		—		1 (Note: One appearance in the Football League Trophy)	0	5	0
Leyton Orient (loan)	2012–13	League One	1	0	—		—		—		1	0
Torquay United (loan)	2013–14	League Two	9	2	1	0	—		—		10	2
Dagenham & Redbridge (loan)	2013–14	League Two	15	3	—		—		—		15	3
AFC Wimbledon	2014–15	League Two	43	5	4	0	0	0	3 (Note: Three appearances in the Football League Trophy)	1	50	6
AFC Wimbledon	2015–16	League Two	42	7	1	0	1	0	4 (Note: Three appearances in League Two play-offs, one in Football League Trophy)	1	48	8
AFC Wimbledon	Total		85	12	5	0	1	0	7	2	98	14
Partick Thistle	2016–17	Scottish Premiership	38	2	3	0	5	1	—		46	0
Cambridge United	2017–18	League Two	13	0	1	0	1	0	1	0	16	0
Cambridge United	2018–19	League Two	26	2	1	0	1	1	4	5	32	8
Cambridge United	Total		39	2	2	0	2	1	5	5	48	8
Dover Athletic (loan)	2017–18	National League	12	1	—		—		—		12	1
Newport County	2018–19	League Two	12	1	—		—		3 (Note: Three appearances in the League Two Playoffs)	0	15	1
Newport County	2019–20	League Two	0	0	0	0	0	0	0	0	0	0
Newport County	Total		12	1	0	0	0	0	3	0	15	1
Torquay United (loan)	2019–20	National League	3	1	—		—		—		3	1
Dover Athletic	2020–21	National League	13	2	1	0	—		1 (Note: One appearance in the FA Trophy)	1	15	3
Dartford	2021–22	National League South	36	11	3	4	—		8 (Note: Three appearances in the FA Trophy) (Note: One appearance in the London Senior Cup) (Note: Three appearances in the Kent Senior Cup) (Note: One appearance in the National League South play-offs)	3	47	18
Welling United	2022–23	National League South	42	15	3	0	—		2 (Note: Two appearances in the FA Trophy)	2	47	17
Billericay Town	2023–24	Isthmian League Premier Division	15	3	5	3	—		3 (Note: Two appearances in the FA Trophy) (Note: One appearance in the Essex Senior Cup)	2	23	8
Billericay Town	2024–25	Isthmian League Premier Division	11	0	0	0	—		2 (Note: Appearance(s) in Alan Turvey Trophy)	1	13	1
Billericay Town	Total		26	3	5	3	0	0	5	3	36	9
Sittingbourne (loan)	2024–25	Isthmian League South East Division	15	5	0	0	—		3 (Note: Two appearances and two goals in the Isthmian League South East play-offs)	2	18	7
Hemel Hempstead Town	2025–26	National League South	15	0	1	0	—		0	0	16	0
Welling United	2025–26	Isthmian League Premier Division	3	1	—		—		—		3	1
Career totals			368	61	25	7	8	2	35	18	435	88

== Honours ==
AFC Wimbledon

- Football League Two play-offs: 2016

Dartford

- Kent Senior Cup: 2019–20, 2021–22

Individual

- National League South Player of the Month: August/September 2021
