= 2012–13 Football League Two =

Football League Two
- Season: 2012–13
- Champions: Gillingham (2nd divisional title)
- Promoted: 1st Gillingham; 2nd Rotherham United; 3rd Port Vale; 7th Bradford City
- Relegated: Barnet; Aldershot Town
- Matches: 552
- Goals: 1,415 (2.56 per match)
- Top goalscorer: Tom Pope (31 goals)
- Biggest home win: Port Vale 7–1 Burton Albion
- Biggest away win: Morecambe 0–4 Fleetwood Town; AFC Wimbledon 0–4 Southend United; Fleetwood Town 0–4 Burton Albion; Oxford United 0–4 Rotherham United
- Highest scoring: 8 goals Burton Albion 6–2 AFC Wimbledon; Port Vale 6–2 Rotherham United; Port Vale 7–1 Burton Albion
- Longest winning run: 5 games Rotherham United
- Longest unbeaten run: 10 games Southend United
- Longest winless run: 16 games York City
- Longest losing run: 7 games Torquay United
- Highest attendance: 13,461; Bradford City v Rotherham United (16 April 2013)
- Lowest attendance: 1,031; Accrington Stanley v Dagenham & Redbridge (5 January 2013)
- Average attendance: 4,390

The 2012–13 Football League Two (referred to as the Npower Football League Two for sponsorship reasons) was the ninth season of the league under its current title and twentieth season under its current league division format. It started on 18 August 2012 and finished on 27 April 2013 with all matches that day kicking off simultaneously.

== Changes from last season ==
=== Team changes ===
==== From League Two ====
Promoted to League One

- Swindon Town
- Shrewsbury Town
- Crawley Town
- Crewe Alexandra

Relegated to Conference National

- Hereford United
- Macclesfield Town

==== To League Two ====
Relegated from League One

- Wycombe Wanderers
- Chesterfield
- Exeter City
- Rochdale

Promoted from Conference National

- Fleetwood Town
- York City

== Team overview ==
=== Stadia and locations ===
Note: Table shows mathematically qualified teams as of 28 April 2012 in alphabetical order.

Locations of League Two 2012–13 teams

Team	Location	Stadium	Capacity
Accrington Stanley	Accrington	Crown Ground	5,057
AFC Wimbledon	Kingston upon Thames Greater London	Kingsmeadow	4,850
Aldershot Town	Aldershot	Recreation Ground	7,100
Barnet	Barnet Greater London	Underhill Stadium	5,260
Bradford City	Bradford	Valley Parade	25,136
Bristol Rovers	Bristol	Memorial Stadium	12,011
Burton Albion	Burton upon Trent	Pirelli Stadium	6,912
Cheltenham Town	Cheltenham	Whaddon Road	7,066
Chesterfield	Chesterfield	Proact Stadium	10,338
Dagenham & Redbridge	Dagenham Greater London	Victoria Road	6,078
Exeter City	Exeter	St James Park	8,830
Fleetwood Town	Fleetwood	Highbury Stadium	5,094
Gillingham	Gillingham	Priestfield Stadium	11,582
Morecambe	Morecambe	Globe Arena	6,476
Northampton Town	Northampton	Sixfields Stadium	7,653
Oxford United	Oxford	Kassam Stadium	12,500
Plymouth Argyle	Plymouth	Home Park	16,388
Port Vale	Stoke-on-Trent	Vale Park	19,052
Rochdale	Rochdale	Spotland Stadium	10,249
Rotherham United	Rotherham	New York Stadium	12,021
Southend United	Southend-on-Sea	Roots Hall	12,392
Torquay United	Torquay	Plainmoor	6,104
Wycombe Wanderers	High Wycombe	Adams Park	10,284
York City	York	Bootham Crescent	7,872

=== Personnel and sponsoring ===
Team	Manager	Chairman	Team captain	Kit maker	Sponsor
Accrington Stanley	James Beattie	Peter Marsden	Dean Winnard	Samurai Sportswear	Clever Boxes
AFC Wimbledon	Neal Ardley	Erik Samuelson	Mat Mitchel-King	Tempest Sports	Football Manager (H); Sports Interactive (A)
Aldershot Town	Andy Scott	Kris Machala	Ben Herd	Erreà	EBB Paper
Barnet	Edgar Davids	Anthony Kleanthous	Jonathan Fortune	Surridge	Pulse Fitness
Bradford City	Phil Parkinson	Mark Lawn; Julian Rhodes	Gary Jones	Nike	Map Group UK
Bristol Rovers	John Ward	Nick Higgs	Matthew Gill	Erreà	Opus Recruitment (H); CR Windows (A)
Burton Albion	Gary Rowett	Ben Robinson	John McGrath	TAG	Mr Cropper
Cheltenham Town	Mark Yates	Paul Baker	Russell Penn	Erreà	Mira Showers
Chesterfield	Paul Cook	Dave Allen	Sam Hird	Puma	Kick Energy
Dagenham & Redbridge	Wayne Burnett	Dave Andrews	Abu Ogogo	Vandanel	West & Coe Funeral Directors
Exeter City	Paul Tisdale	Edward Chorlton	Danny Coles	Joma	Flybe
Fleetwood Town	Graham Alexander	Andy Pilley	Steve McNulty	Nike	BES Commercial Gas
Gillingham	Martin Allen	Paul Scally	Adam Barrett	Vandanel	Medway Electrical & Mechanical Services
Morecambe	Jim Bentley	Peter McGuigan	Will Haining	Fila	Carbrini
Northampton Town	Aidy Boothroyd	David Cardoza	John Johnson	Erreà	Jackson Grundy
Oxford United	Chris Wilder	Ian Lenagan	Jake Wright	Nike	Bridle Insurance
Plymouth Argyle	John Sheridan	James Brent	Darren Purse	Puma	Bond Timber
Port Vale	Micky Adams	Paul Wildes	Doug Loft	Sondico	UK Windows Systems Ltd (H)
Rochdale	Keith Hill	Chris Dunphy	Gary Jones	Fila	Co-Operative
Rotherham United	Steve Evans	Tony Stewart	Johnny Mullins	Puma	Parkgate Shopping
Southend United	Phil Brown	Ron Martin	Chris Barker	Nike	InsureandGo
Torquay United	Alan Knill	Simon Baker	Lee Mansell	Sondico	Sparkworld
Wycombe Wanderers	Gareth Ainsworth	Ivor Beeks MBE	Gareth Ainsworth	Kukri	Dreams
York City	Nigel Worthington	Jason McGill	Chris Smith	Nike	benenden health

==== Managerial changes ====
Team	Outgoing manager	Manner of departure	Date of vacancy	Position in table	Incoming manager	Date of appointment
Burton Albion	Paul Peschisolido	Sacked	17 March 2012	Pre-season	Gary Rowett	10 May 2012
Gillingham	Andy Hessenthaler	Resigned	8 May 2012	Pre-season	Martin Allen	5 July 2012
Barnet	Martin Allen	End of contract	31 May 2012	Pre-season	Mark Robson; Edgar Davids	11 June 2012; 11 October 2012
Chesterfield	John Sheridan	Sacked	28 August 2012	18th	Paul Cook	25 October 2012
AFC Wimbledon	Terry Brown	Sacked	19 September 2012	21st	Neal Ardley	10 October 2012
Wycombe Wanderers	Gary Waddock	Sacked	22 September 2012	21st	Gareth Ainsworth	8 November 2012
Accrington Stanley	Paul Cook	Signed by Chesterfield	25 October 2012	16th	Leam Richardson	1 November 2012
Fleetwood Town	Micky Mellon	Sacked	1 December 2012	8th	Graham Alexander	6 December 2012
Bristol Rovers	Mark McGhee	Sacked	15 December 2012	23rd	John Ward	17 December 2012
Barnet	Mark Robson	Mutual consent	29 December 2012	22nd	Edgar Davids	29 December 2012
Plymouth Argyle	Carl Fletcher	Sacked	1 January 2013	21st	John Sheridan	6 January 2013
Rochdale	John Coleman	Sacked	21 January 2013	14th	Keith Hill	22 January 2013
Aldershot Town	Dean Holdsworth	Sacked	20 February 2013	20th	Andy Scott	22 February 2013
Dagenham & Redbridge	John Still	Signed by Luton Town	26 February 2013	16th	Wayne Burnett	2 May 2013
York City	Gary Mills	Sacked	2 March 2013	18th	Nigel Worthington	4 March 2013
Southend United	Paul Sturrock	Sacked	24 March 2013	9th	Phil Brown	25 March 2013
Torquay United	Martin Ling	Sacked	29 April 2013	19th	Alan Knill	7 May 2013
Accrington Stanley	Leam Richardson	Signed by Chesterfield	30 April 2013	18th	James Beattie	13 May 2013

== League table ==
Twenty-four teams contest the division: 18 sides remaining in the division from last season, four relegated from League One, and two promoted from Conference National.

Pos	Team	Pld	W	D	L	GF	GA	GD	Pts	Promotion, qualification or relegation
1	Gillingham (C, P)	46	23	14	9	66	39	+27	83	Promotion to Football League One
2	Rotherham United (P)	46	24	7	15	74	59	+15	79	Promotion to Football League One
3	Port Vale (P)	46	21	15	10	87	52	+35	78	Promotion to Football League One
4	Burton Albion	46	22	10	14	71	65	+6	76	Qualification for League Two play-offs (Note: Four teams play for one spot and promotion to Football League One.)
5	Cheltenham Town	46	20	15	11	58	51	+7	75	Qualification for League Two play-offs
6	Northampton Town	46	21	10	15	64	55	+9	73	Qualification for League Two play-offs
7	Bradford City (O, P)	46	18	15	13	63	52	+11	69	Qualification for League Two play-offs
8	Chesterfield	46	18	13	15	60	45	+15	67	
9	Oxford United	46	19	8	19	60	61	−1	65	
10	Exeter City	46	18	10	18	63	62	+1	64	
11	Southend United	46	16	13	17	61	55	+6	61	
12	Rochdale	46	16	13	17	68	70	−2	61	
13	Fleetwood Town	46	15	15	16	55	57	−2	60	
14	Bristol Rovers	46	16	12	18	60	69	−9	60	
15	Wycombe Wanderers	46	17	9	20	50	60	−10	60	
16	Morecambe	46	15	13	18	55	61	−6	58	
17	York City	46	12	19	15	50	60	−10	55	
18	Accrington Stanley	46	14	12	20	51	68	−17	54	
19	Torquay United	46	13	14	19	55	62	−7	53	
20	AFC Wimbledon	46	14	11	21	54	76	−22	53	
21	Plymouth Argyle	46	13	13	20	46	55	−9	52	
22	Dagenham & Redbridge	46	13	12	21	55	62	−7	51	
23	Barnet (R)	46	13	12	21	47	59	−12	51	Relegation to the Conference Premier
24	Aldershot Town (R)	46	11	15	20	42	60	−18	48	Relegation to the Conference Premier

Updated to match(es) played on 27 April 2013. Source: BBC Sport
Rules for classification: 1) Points; 2) Goal difference; 3) Number of goals scored
(C) Champions; (O) Play-off winners; (P) Promoted; (R) Relegated

== Play-offs ==
Semifinals
4	Burton Albion	3	1	4
7	Bradford City	2	3	5
5	Cheltenham Town	0	0	0
6	Northampton Town	1	1	2

Final
6	Northampton Town	0
7	Bradford City	3

== Results ==
Home \ Away	ACC	WIM	ALD	BAR	BRA	BRR	BRT	CHL	CHF	D&R	EXE	FLE	GIL	MOR	NOR	OXF	PLY	PTV	ROC	ROT	STD	TOR	WYC	YOR
Accrington Stanley		4–0	1–0	3–2	1–1	1–0	3–3	2–2	1–0	0–2	0–3	0–3	1–1	2–0	2–4	0–3	1–1	2–0	2–3	1–2	1–1	0–0	0–2	0–1
AFC Wimbledon	1–2		1–1	0–1	2–1	3–1	1–1	1–2	1–0	2–2	2–2	2–1	0–1	2–0	1–1	0–3	1–1	2–2	1–2	0–1	0–4	0–1	2–2	3–2
Aldershot Town	2–0	0–1		1–0	0–2	2–2	1–2	0–1	0–1	1–0	1–2	2–0	1–1	0–0	1–2	3–2	1–2	1–3	4–2	0–3	0–2	1–0	0–0	0–2
Barnet	1–1	1–1	0–1		2–0	1–1	3–2	0–0	0–2	0–0	1–2	2–0	1–3	4–1	4–0	2–2	1–4	0–0	0–0	0–0	2–0	1–0	1–0	1–3
Bradford City	2–1	5–1	1–1	3–0		4–1	1–0	3–1	0–0	1–1	0–1	1–0	0–1	3–1	1–0	1–2	1–0	0–1	2–4	0–2	2–2	1–0	1–0	1–1
Bristol Rovers	0–1	1–0	2–2	2–1	3–3		3–0	0–1	3–2	0–1	2–0	0–0	0–2	0–3	3–1	0–2	2–1	2–0	2–1	1–2	2–3	3–2	1–0	0–0
Burton Albion	1–0	6–2	0–1	1–0	1–0	1–1		3–1	0–1	3–2	4–2	0–1	3–2	3–2	3–3	4–0	1–0	1–1	3–2	2–0	2–0	2–1	2–0	3–1
Cheltenham Town	0–3	2–1	1–1	1–0	0–0	1–1	1–0		1–0	2–0	3–0	2–2	1–0	2–0	1–0	2–1	2–1	1–1	0–0	3–0	1–3	2–1	4–0	1–1
Chesterfield	4–3	2–0	0–0	0–1	2–2	2–0	1–1	4–1		1–2	4–0	1–2	0–1	1–1	3–0	2–1	1–2	2–2	1–1	1–1	0–1	1–1	3–1	3–0
Dagenham & Redbridge	1–1	0–1	0–0	1–0	4–3	2–4	1–1	1–0	0–1		1–1	1–0	1–2	1–2	0–1	0–1	0–0	2–3	2–1	5–0	0–3	2–2	3–0	0–1
Exeter City	2–0	2–0	0–0	2–2	4–1	1–2	3–0	0–1	0–1	0–1		2–2	0–0	0–3	3–0	1–3	1–1	0–2	1–2	0–1	3–0	0–1	3–2	1–1
Fleetwood Town	1–3	1–1	4–1	2–1	2–2	0–3	0–4	1–1	1–3	2–1	0–0		2–2	1–0	1–0	3–0	3–0	2–5	0–3	1–1	0–0	0–0	0–1	0–0
Gillingham	1–0	2–2	4–0	0–1	3–1	4–0	4–1	0–0	1–1	2–1	2–3	2–2		2–1	2–0	0–1	2–1	1–2	1–2	1–0	1–0	1–0	0–1	1–1
Morecambe	0–0	3–1	2–1	4–1	0–0	1–1	0–0	0–0	2–0	2–1	0–3	0–4	1–1		1–1	1–1	2–3	1–3	3–0	2–1	1–0	0–2	0–1	2–2
Northampton Town	2–0	2–0	2–0	2–0	0–1	1–0	1–0	2–3	0–0	3–1	3–0	3–1	1–2	3–0		1–0	1–0	2–0	3–1	2–1	3–3	1–0	3–1	0–2
Oxford United	5–0	3–2	1–1	1–0	0–2	0–2	1–1	1–0	0–1	2–3	2–4	1–2	0–0	1–1	2–1		2–1	2–1	3–0	0–4	2–0	0–0	0–1	0–0
Plymouth Argyle	0–0	1–2	0–2	2–1	0–0	1–1	1–2	2–0	0–1	0–0	1–0	2–1	2–2	2–1	3–2	0–1		1–3	3–1	0–1	1–1	1–1	0–1	2–0
Port Vale	3–0	3–0	1–1	3–0	0–0	4–0	7–1	3–2	0–2	1–1	0–2	0–2	0–2	0–1	2–2	3–0	4–0		2–2	6–2	1–2	1–1	4–1	2–2
Rochdale	0–3	0–1	1–1	2–0	0–0	2–1	0–1	4–1	1–1	2–2	2–3	0–0	1–1	1–2	0–0	2–0	1–0	2–2		1–2	4–2	1–0	4–1	2–3
Rotherham United	4–1	1–0	2–0	0–2	4–0	1–3	3–0	4–2	1–0	1–2	4–1	2–1	1–2	2–1	3–1	3–1	1–0	1–2	2–3		0–3	1–0	2–3	1–1
Southend United	0–1	1–3	1–2	2–2	2–2	0–0	0–1	1–2	3–0	3–1	2–1	1–1	0–1	0–1	1–2	1–0	0–2	0–0	3–1	1–1		1–1	1–0	0–0
Torquay United	3–1	2–3	4–3	3–2	1–3	3–3	1–1	2–2	2–1	2–1	1–1	0–1	2–1	1–0	1–1	1–3	0–0	0–1	4–2	1–3	1–4		1–2	2–1
Wycombe Wanderers	0–1	0–1	2–1	0–0	0–3	2–0	3–0	1–1	2–1	1–0	0–1	1–0	0–1	2–2	0–0	1–3	1–1	1–1	1–2	2–2	1–2	2–1		4–0
York City	1–1	0–3	0–0	1–2	0–2	4–1	3–0	0–0	2–2	3–2	1–2	0–2	0–0	1–4	1–1	3–1	2–0	0–2	0–0	0–0	2–1	0–2	1–3	

Updated to match(es) played on 27 April 2013. Source: The Football League
Legend: Blue = home team win; Yellow = draw; Red = away team win.

== Season statistics ==
=== Top scorers ===
As of 20 April 2013

Rank	Player	Club	Goals
1	(England) Tom Pope	Port Vale	31
2	(England) Jamie Cureton	Exeter City	21
3	(Wales) Daniel Nardiello	Rotherham United	19
4	(Bermuda) Nahki Wells	Bradford City	18
5	(England) Adebayo Akinfenwa	Northampton Town	16
5	(England) Rene Howe	Torquay United	16
7	(Democratic Republic of the Congo) Britt Assombalonga	Southend United	15
7	(England) Robert Grant	Rochdale	15
7	(Democratic Republic of the Congo) Jacques Maghoma	Burton Albion	15
7	(England) Jack Redshaw	Morecambe	15

=== Assists ===
As of 6 April 2013

Rank	Player	Club	Assists
1	(England) Kevan Hurst	Southend United	14
2	(England) Chris Hackett	Northampton Town	13
3	(England) Ben Tozer	Northampton Town	12
4	(England) Tom Pope	Port Vale	11
4	(England) Matthew Saunders	Dagenham and Redbridge	11
6	(England) Billy Jones	Cheltenham Town	10
7	(Republic of Ireland) Mark Byrne	Barnet	9
7	(England) Kevin Ellison	Morecambe	9
7	(England) Jason Kennedy	Rochdale	9
7	(England) Jennison Myrie-Williams	Port Vale	9

=== Hat-tricks ===
Player	For	Against	Result	Date
(England) Tom Pope^{4}	Port Vale	Rotherham United	6–2	8 September 2012
(England) Tom Pope	Port Vale	Bristol Rovers	4–0	20 November 2012
(England) Tom Pope	Port Vale	Cheltenham Town	3–2	29 March 2013
(England) Jon Parkin	Fleetwood Town	Morecambe	0–4	8 September 2012
(England) Tom Craddock^{4}	Oxford United	Accrington Stanley	5–0	20 October 2012
(England) Ricky Holmes	Barnet	Burton Albion	3–2	21 December 2012
(England) Kevin Ellison	Morecambe	AFC Wimbledon	3–1	24 November 2012

- ^{4} Player scored 4 goals

=== Scoring ===
- First goal of the season: Troy Brown for Aldershot Town against Plymouth Argyle (18 August 2012)
- Fastest goal of the season: 14 seconds, Sam Morsy for Port Vale against Morecambe (25 August 2012)
- Latest goal of the season: 94 minutes and 17 seconds, Jason Walker for York City against Chesterfield (8 September 2012) and Oliver Norburn for Bristol Rovers against Cheltenham Town (5 February 2013)
- Largest winning margin: 6 goals
  - Port Vale 7–1 Burton Albion (5 April 2013)

=== Most league wins ===
Rotherham United 24

=== Clean sheets ===
- Most clean sheets: 13
  - Fleetwood Town
- Fewest clean sheets: 6
  - AFC Wimbledon

=== Discipline ===
- Most yellow cards (club): 44
  - Fleetwood Town
- Most yellow cards (player): 7
  - Tom Parkes (Bristol Rovers)
  - Kevin Ellison (Morecambe)
  - Josh Scowen (Wycombe Wanderers)
  - Junior Brown (Fleetwood Town)
  - Rene Howe (Torquay United)
- Most red cards (club): 6
  - Bristol Rovers
- Most red cards (player): 2
  - Edgar Davids (Barnet)

== Monthly awards ==
Month	Manager of the Month		Player of the Month		Reference
Month	Manager	Club	Player	Club	Reference
August	(England) Martin Allen	Gillingham	(England) Jake Wright	Oxford United	
September	(England) Micky Adams	Port Vale	(England) Tom Pope	Port Vale	
October	(England) Mark Yates	Cheltenham Town	(England) Ashley Vincent	Port Vale	
November	(Scotland) Paul Sturrock	Southend United	(England) Adebayo Akinfenwa	Northampton Town	
December	(England) Gary Rowett	Burton Albion	(England) Ashley Grimes	Rochdale	
January	(England) Martin Allen	Gillingham	(England) Tom Parkes	Bristol Rovers	
February	(England) Gary Rowett	Burton Albion	(Democratic Republic of the Congo) Jacques Maghoma	Burton Albion	
March	(Republic of Ireland) John Sheridan	Plymouth Argyle	(England) Jason Banton	Plymouth Argyle	
April	(Northern Ireland) Nigel Worthington	York City	(England) Chris Smith	York City	
