= Steve Perez =

British rally driver and entrepreneur (born 1956)

Steven James Garcia Perez (born 14 December 1956) is an entrepreneur and rally driver from Chesterfield, Derbyshire. He is the founder of alcohol and soft drinks company Global Brands and driver for the Kick Energy Rally Team.

== Early life ==
He was educated at the independent Mount St Mary's College in north Derbyshire.

== Career ==
=== Beverage and hospitality industry career ===
Steve Perez is the son of Santiago Perez, who opened the Red Lion pub and restaurant in Stone Edge, Chesterfield in the 1960s. According to an interview Perez gave to The Grocer magazine, his first job was peeling potatoes in the kitchen of the pub. Santiago died in 1975 and the family sold the pub. In the early 1980s he worked in restaurants as a waiter and chef in Barcelona. He returned to the UK and setup the Global Beer Company in 1986. The company, which was based in Chesterfield, imported bottled beers from continental Europe to local pubs and clubs. However, changes to UK law meant that the business ceased trading.

In 1997 Perez setup the 'Global Brands' company in Chesterfield. The company manufactures, markets and distributes a range of alcohol and soft drinks brands, including the VK and Kick Energy brands. The company has headquarters at the Casa Hotel in Chesterfield, which Perez also owns.

In 2011 Perez built and opened the Casa Hotel in Chesterfield. The large hotel currently holds a four star rating and Inspector's Choice award with the AA and it was awarded 'UK's Comfiest Bed of the Year' in 2012 by laterooms.com and was Derbyshire's highest awarded 4 star hotel in 2013 and 14. The Casa Hotel is a popular wedding venue, and in addition to the Hotel's facilities, Perez sometimes allows his home, the 350 acre Walton Lodge Estate, to be used by Casa wedding parties for photographs and receptions in marquees.

In 2017 he purchased the Peak Edge Hotel and Red Lion Pub and Restaurant, which his family had owned over 40 years previously, making it the second hotel that Perez owns.

=== Rally career ===
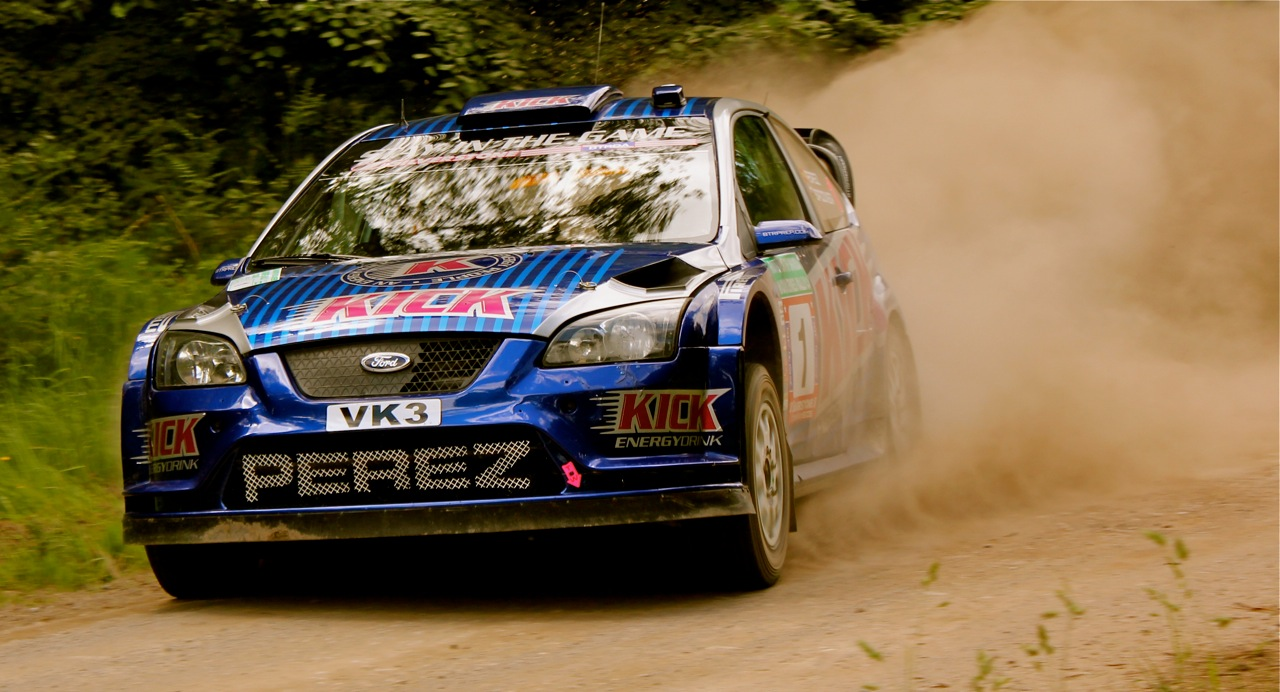
Steve Perez at the Dukeries Rally 2010.

Perez successfully competes as a professional rally driver with the Kick Energy Rally Team in his many cars Including a 2007 Ford Focus WRC (Ex Marcus Grönholm), 1974 Lancia Stratos, Porsche 911s (2003 Rally Championship Winner), 1975 Porsche SCRS, 1975 Datsun 240Z (Safari Rally Car), 1984 Audi Quattro, 2005 Ford Focus WRC (Ex Markko Märtin) and a 2007 Mitsubishi Evo 9 (Peru Rally).

The Kick Energy Rally Team won the Historic Championship in 2004, the National Championship in 2005. Perez was crowned the 2004 ANCRO British National Rally Champion and won the 2010 Silverstone Tyres BTRDA Gold Star Championship.

Perez was entered into the WRC Wales Rally GB in 2009 by the Stobart VK M-Sport Ford Rally Team to which Global Brands Vodka Kick was a sponsor.

Whilst competing in the Ypres Rally in Belgium in 2018 his car caught fire, and he received hospital treatment.

==== Complete WRC results ====
Year	Entrant	Car	1	2	3	4	5	6	7	8	9	10	11	12	13	14	15	WDC	Points
2002	Steve Perez	Mitsubishi Lancer Evo	MON	SWE	FRA	ESP	CYP	ARG	GRE	KEN	FIN	GER	ITA	NZL	AUS	GBR; 34		NC	0
2003	Steve Perez	Ford Focus RS WRC 02	MON	SWE	TUR	NZL	ARG	GRE	CYP	GER	FIN	AUS	ITA	FRA	ESP	GBR; 25		NC	0
2008	Stobart VK M-Sport Ford Rally Team	Ford Focus RS WRC 04	MON	SWE	MEX	ARG	JOR	ITA	GRE	TUR	FIN	GER	NZL	ESP	FRA	JPN	GBR; 19	NC	0
2009	Stobart VK M-Sport Ford Rally Team	Ford Focus RS WRC 07	IRE	NOR	CYP	POR	ARG	ITA	GRE	POL	FIN	AUS	ESP	GBR; 11				NC	0

=== Awards and honours ===
In 2002 Perez was awarded 'CBI Entrepreneur of the Year' at the CBI's Growing Business Awards.

In November 2018 he was awarded an Honorary Master of Business Administration (HonMBA) by the University of Derby at a Graduation Ceremony at Derby Arena for his contribution to business in the region.

== Personal life ==
In 2000 he was living at Ashover in Derbyshire. He currently lives at Walton Lodge.
