= Shaq Coulthirst =

English footballer (born 1994)

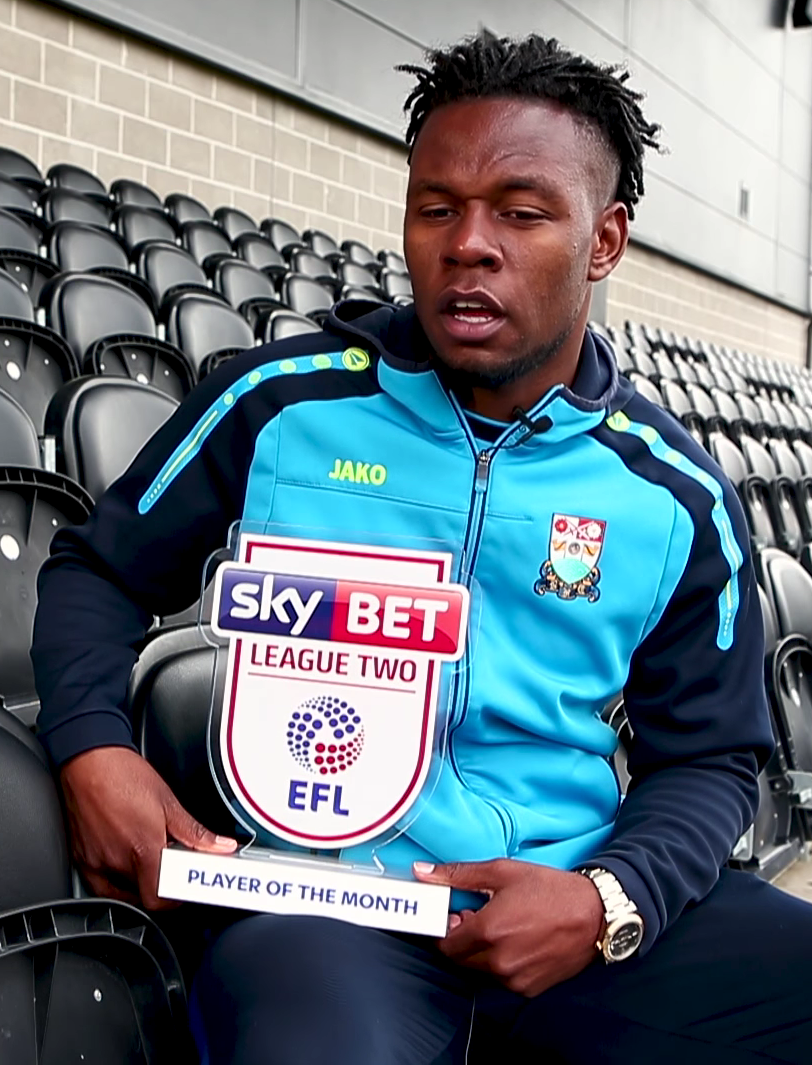
- Coulthirst in 2017

Personal information
- Full name: Shaquile Tyshan Coulthirst
- Date of birth: 2 November 1994 (age 32)
- Place of birth: Hackney, England
- Height: 5 ft 11 in (1.80 m)
- Position: Striker

Team information
- Current team: Peterborough Sports

Youth career
- –2013: Tottenham Hotspur

Senior career*
Years	Team	Apps	(Gls)
2013–2016	Tottenham Hotspur	0	(0)
2014	→ Leyton Orient (loan)	1	(1)
2014	→ Torquay United (loan)	6	(2)
2014–2015	→ Southend United (loan)	22	(4)
2015	→ York City (loan)	11	(2)
2015	→ Wigan Athletic (loan)	2	(0)
2016–2017	Peterborough United	35	(4)
2017	→ Mansfield Town (loan)	20	(5)
2017–2020	Barnet	81	(23)
2020–2021	Boreham Wood	16	(1)
2021–2022	Billericay Town	11	(2)
2022–2024	Ebbsfleet United	55	(8)
2023–2024	→ Braintree Town (loan)	29	(11)
2024–2025	Maidstone United	38	(5)
2025–	Peterborough Sports	0	(0)

International career
2013	England U19	2	(1)
- * Club domestic league appearances and goals as of 13:53, 13 July 2025 (UTC)

Shaquile Tyshan Coulthirst (born 2 November 1994) is an English professional footballer who plays as a striker for Southern League Premier Division Central club Peterborough Sports.

== Club career ==
=== Tottenham Hotspur ===
Coulthirst was born in Hackney, London. He came from the youth academy of Tottenham Hotspur and in June 2013, Coulthirst signed his first professional contract with the club.

Coulthirst made his first-team debut for Tottenham Hotspur on 12 December 2013 in the UEFA Europa League group stage against Anzhi Makhachkala. He replaced Roberto Soldado after 78 minutes in a 4–1 home win.

==== Loan Spells ====
On 3 January 2014, Coulthirst signed for League One team Leyton Orient on a one-month loan deal. On 11 January he scored his first senior goal on his home debut for the club in a 4–0 win over Carlisle United. He returned to Tottenham on 4 February 2014, after making two appearances and scoring one goal during his time at Brisbane Road.

On 28 March 2014, Coulthirst joined League Two club Torquay United on loan until the end of the 2013–14 season. The next day, Coulthirst made his debut for Torquay United, coming on as a substitute for Jayden Stockley in the 60th minutes, in a 1–0 loss against Southend United. Then on 12 April 2014, Coulthirst scored his first goal and assisted the goal for Torquay United, in a 2–1 win over Bristol Rovers (Ironically, Torquay United and Bristol Rovers were later relegated out of the Football League in 2013–14). As a result of his performance, Coulthirst was named Football League Team of the Week. Coulthirst later scored his second goal for the club on 26 April 2014, in a 3–1 win over Mansfield Town, in hope of survival relegation. However, Coulthirst suffered an ankle injury, which caused him to miss the last match of the season and returned to his parent club after making six appearances and scoring twice during his time at Plainmoor. As a result of his absence, Torquay United eventually lose 3–0 to Wycombe Wanderers, confirming Torquay United's relegation from the Football League.

Coulthirst joined League Two club Southend United on loan until the end of 2014–15. Five days later, Coulthirst made his Southend United debut, making his first start for them, in the opening match of the season, in a 1–0 win over Accrington Stanley Coulthirst scored his first goal for Southend United, just three minutes after coming on as a substitute, in a 2–0 win over Portsmouth. Coulthirst later score three more goals to his tally against Shrewsbury Town, Northampton Town and York City. However, just two months left until the season end, Coulthirst was recalled by Tottenham Hotspur. After his loan spell with Southend United came to an end, Coulthirst quoted: "The loan was the best experience of [my] career so far."

Coulthirst joined League Two club York City on loan until the end of 2014–15 on 13 March 2015. The next day, Coulthirst made his York City debut, coming on as a substitute for Jake Hyde in the second half, in a 0–0 draw against Carlisle United. Weeks later on 28 March 2015, Coulthirst then scored his first goals, in a 4–1 win over Mansfield Town. After the match, manager Russ Wilcox praised Coulthirst's performance, as well as his commitment into joining York City. He finished the loan with 11 appearances and two goals.

On 14 August 2015, Coulthirst joined League One club Wigan Athletic on loan until 1 November 2015.

=== Peterborough United ===
On 22 January 2016, Coulthirst signed for League One club Peterborough United on a three-and-a-half-year contract for an undisclosed fee.

On 19 January 2017, Coulthirst joined League Two club Mansfield Town on loan until the end of 2016–17, with a view to a permanent transfer.

=== Barnet ===
On 26 July 2017, Coulthirst signed for League 2 club Barnet on an undisclosed-length contract, after being allowed to leave Peterborough by mutual consent. He scored his first goal for Barnet in a 3–1 EFL Cup win against former club Peterborough United on 8 August 2017. He scored his first senior hat-trick in a 4–1 win over Swindon Town on 2 September 2017. He scored a winning penalty goal in the FA Cup against Sheffield United to send the National League side into the 4th round for the first time in 11 years, and also scored twice against Brentford in the following round. Coulthirst left the Bees at the end of the 2019–20 season, having scored 33 goals in 94 games.

=== Boreham Wood ===
Coulthirst signed for Boreham Wood on a one-year deal on 17 September 2020 after a successful trial. He left the club at the end of the season after one goal in 20 appearances.

=== Billericay Town ===
On 12 November 2021 he dropped down a division to sign for National League South side Billericay Town, having trained with the club for a number of weeks. He scored twice in 12 games during his time with the club.

=== Ebbsfleet United ===
Coulthirst joined Ebbsfleet United on 8 February 2022.

In October 2023, he joined Braintree Town on loan until the end of January 2024. His loan was then extended until the end of the campaign however, was cut short in April with Coulthirst returning to Ebbsfleet for the final two games of the season as they looked to avoid relegation from the National League. Having survived relegation on the final day of the season, he departed the club on a free transfer.

=== Maidstone United ===
On 14 June 2024, Coulthirst agreed to join National League South side Maidstone United.

=== Peterborough Sports ===
On 11 July 2025, Coulthirst joined National League North side Peterborough Sports.

== International career ==
Coulthirst made his debut for the England national under-19 team as 62nd-minute substitute for Max Clayton in a 1–1 draw with Belgium on 26 May 2013. He earned his second and final cap at this level three days later in a 3–0 win over Scotland, opening the scoring in the 17th minute before being substituted for Callum Harriott in the 75th minute.

== Career statistics ==
As of end of 2024–25 season

Appearances and goals by club, season and competition
Club	Season	League			FA Cup		League Cup		Other		Total	
Club	Season	Division	Apps	Goals	Apps	Goals	Apps	Goals	Apps	Goals	Apps	Goals
Tottenham Hotspur	2012–13	Premier League	0	0	0	0	0	0	0	0	0	0
Tottenham Hotspur	2013–14	Premier League	0	0	—		0	0	1 (Note: Appearance in UEFA Europa League)	0	1	0
Tottenham Hotspur	2014–15	Premier League	0	0	—		—		—		0	0
Tottenham Hotspur	2015–16	Premier League	0	0	0	0	—		0	0	0	0
Tottenham Hotspur	Total		0	0	0	0	0	0	1	0	1	0
Leyton Orient (loan)	2013–14	League One	1	1	1	0	—		—		2	1
Torquay United (loan)	2013–14	League Two	6	2	—		—		—		6	2
Southend United (loan)	2014–15	League Two	22	4	1	0	1	0	1 (Note: Appearance in Football League Trophy)	0	25	4
York City (loan)	2014–15	League Two	11	2	—		—		—		11	2
Wigan Athletic (loan)	2015–16	League One	2	0	—		—		—		2	0
Peterborough United	2015–16	League One	19	2	2	1	—		—		21	3
Peterborough United	2016–17	League One	16	2	3	2	2	0	1 (Note: Appearance in EFL Trophy)	0	22	4
Peterborough United	Total		35	4	5	3	2	0	1	0	43	7
Mansfield Town (loan)	2016–17	League Two	20	5	—		—		—		20	5
Barnet	2017–18	League Two	40	10	0	0	2	1	2	1	44	12
Barnet	2018–19	National League	34	12	3	3	—		5 (Note: Appearance in FA Trophy)	5	42	20
Barnet	2019–20	National League	7	1	0	0	—		1 (Note: One appearance in National League play-offs)	0	8	1
Barnet	Total		81	23	3	3	2	1	8	6	94	33
Boreham Wood	2020–21	National League	16	1	3	0	—		1	0	20	1
Billericay Town	2021–22	National League South	11	2	—		—		1	0	12	2
Ebbsfleet United	2021–22	National League South	14	3	—		—		3 (Note: Three appearances in National League South play-offs)	0	17	3
Ebbsfleet United	2022–23	National League South	27	5	3	0	—		1	0	31	5
Ebbsfleet United	2023–24	National League	11	0	2	0	—		0	0	13	0
Ebbsfleet United	Total		52	8	5	0	0	0	4	0	61	8
Braintree Town (loan)	2023–24	National League South	29	11	—		—		0	0	29	11
Maidstone United	2024–25	National League South	38	5	3	1	—		3 (Note: One appearance in FA Trophy, two appearances in National League South play-offs)	0	44	6
Career total			323	69	21	6	5	1	17	6	370	81

== Honours ==
Individual

- EFL League Two Player of the Month: September 2017
