= Courtney Cameron =

English footballer

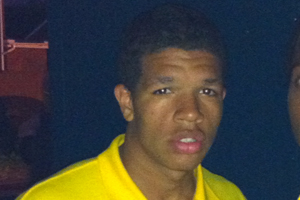
- Cameron in 2011

Personal information
- Full name: Courtney Lee Cameron
- Date of birth: 3 January 1993 (age 33)
- Place of birth: Northampton, England
- Position: Midfielder

Team information
- Current team: Coventry United

Youth career
- –2009: Northampton Town
- 2009–2010: Aston Villa

Senior career*
Years	Team	Apps	(Gls)
2010–2013	Aston Villa	0	(0)
2012–2013	→ Rotherham United (loan)	15	(1)
2013–2015	Torquay United	51	(3)
2015–2016	Southport	5	(0)
2016–2016	Brackley Town	0	(0)
2016–	Coventry United	9	(2)
- * Club domestic league appearances and goals as of 11:07, 10/02/2017 (UTC)

Courtney Lee Cameron (born 3 January 1993) is an English professional footballer who plays for Coventry United as a midfielder. Cameron began his career at Aston Villa.

== Career ==
Born in Northampton, Cameron played for Northampton Town as a schoolboy before moving on to Aston Villa's academy in June 2009 for a fee of £35,000. Since at Aston Villa, Cameron have since rise from youth team to become a regular in the Premier League club's reserve side.

On 16 November 2012, Cameron signed a six-week loan deal with Rotherham United. He made his debut the following day, in a 4–2 victory over against Cheltenham Town at the New York Stadium. He scored his first goal for the club on 1 January 2013, scoring a late goal in a 2–1 win against Rochdale.

At the end of 2012–13 season, Cameron was released after four years at the club. Cameron signed a two-year contract for Torquay United on 8 July 2013.

Courtney Cameron joined Coventry United during the 2016/17 season, competing in the Midland League Premier Division.

== Career statistics ==
As of match played 3 May 2014.

Appearances and goals by club, season and competition
Club	Season	League		FA Cup		League Cup		Other		Total	
Club	Season	Apps	Goals	Apps	Goals	Apps	Goals	Apps	Goals	Apps	Goals
Aston Villa	2012–13	0	0	0	0	0	0	0	0	0	0
Rotherham United (loan)	2012–13	15	1	3	0	0	0	0	0	18	1
Torquay United	2013–14	24	1	1	0	1	0	1	0	27	1
Career total		39	2	4	0	1	0	1	0	45	2
