= Kick Energy =

Energy drink brand

- Product type: Energy Drink
- Produced by: Global Brands
- Country: United Kingdom
- Website: globalbrands.co.uk/brands/soft-drinks/kick-energy.html www.facebook.com/pages/Kick-Energy

Kick Energy is an energy drink marketed in the UK by creator Global Brands. As of 2008, it controlled 15.3% market share of the On Trade Functional Energy Market. Global Brands sells and distributes about 1,000,000 cans of Kick Energy in the UK per month.

== Marketing ==
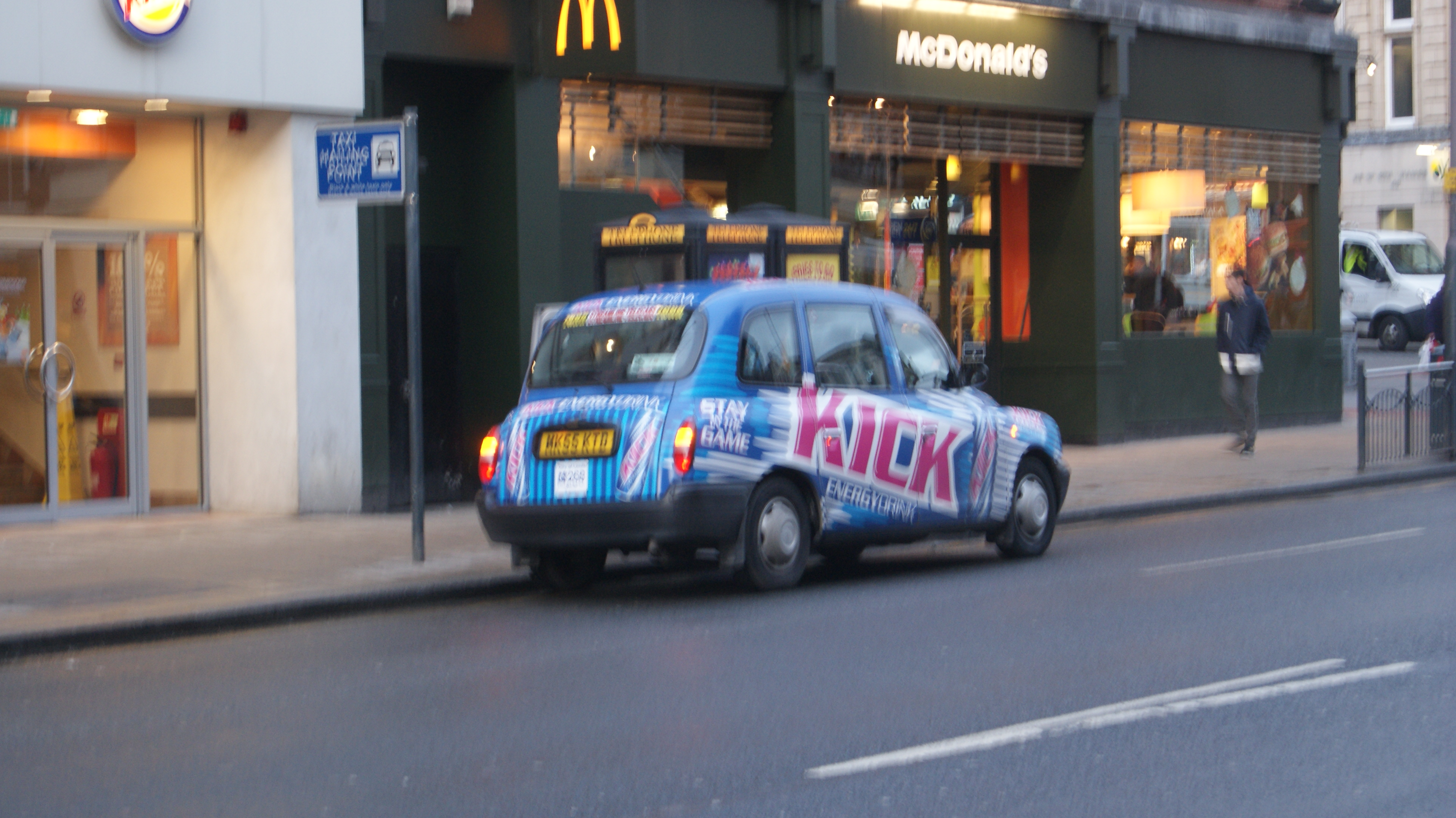
Kick Energy being advertised on a Leeds Taxi

In 2009, Kick Energy ran a £1.9m marketing support package to promote the brand which included sponsoring a Luminar venues tour by boyband JLS Kick Energy's marketing campaign includes branded taxis in every major UK city, trade and consumer PR and exhibitions at key trade shows. Kick Energy has also invested heavily in a programme of sports and motorsports sponsorship, including the Kawasaki World Super Bike Team, as well as the Stobart KICK M-Sport Ford World Rally Team and Powerleague 5-a-side Football which are based in Paisley but operate 45 sites across the UK and are visited by approximately 125,000 customers each week.

Kick Energy sponsored the Steve Perez Rally team. and from 2012 Chesterfield FC.
