= Jordan Chapell =

English footballer (born 1991)

Personal information
- Full name: Jordan Mark Chapell
- Date of birth: 8 September 1991 (age 35)
- Place of birth: Sheffield, England
- Height: 5 ft 9 in (1.75 m)
- Positions: Winger; forward

Youth career
- Sheffield United

Senior career*
Years	Team	Apps	(Gls)
2010–2013	Sheffield United	2	(0)
2012	→ Burton Albion (loan)	2	(1)
2013	→ Torquay United (loan)	6	(0)
2013–2015	Torquay United	59	(6)
2015	→ Grimsby Town (loan)	6	(1)
2015–2018	Chester	69	(5)
2017–2018	→ Stalybridge Celtic (loan)	7	(4)
2018–2019	Matlock Town	20	(1)
2019–2020	Sheffield FC	18	(0)
Total		189	(18)
- * Club domestic league appearances and goals as of 8 March 2020

Jordan Mark Chapell (born 8 September 1991) is an English former professional footballer who played as a forward.

Born in Sheffield, he started his career with his hometown club Sheffield United from where he had loan spells at Burton Albion and Torquay United, who he subsequently joined on a permanent basis. He went on to play for Grimsby Town, Chester, Stalybridge Celtic, Matlock Town and Sheffield FC.

== Playing career ==
=== Sheffield United ===
Chapell began his career at Sheffield United, making his first team début in the League Cup First Round 2–0 defeat by Hartlepool United at the Victoria Park in August 2010. In January 2011 he agreed a contract extension to keep him with the club until the end of the 2011–12 season. After a successful season in the reserves Chapell was handed another new contract in July 2012 to keep him with United for a further twelve months.

The following season Chapell was on the fringes of the United first team, and in October 2012 he agreed a months loan to Burton Albion to gain more first team experience. Chapell made his Albion début later that evening against Port Vale as a 70-minute substitute, scoring only three minutes after coming onto the pitch. He made his first start for Burton Albion in an FA Cup fixture against Altrincham which resulted in a 3–3 draw. With the Blades suffering injury problems Chapell was recalled early from his loan at the start of December, leaving Burton after having made four appearances and scored one goal. After making his first league appearance for United in December 2012, Chapell was loaned out once more in March, moving to Torquay United until the end of the season. He made his Torquay début a few days later, in a 1–1 draw against Southend United at Roots Hall, providing the assist for Joss Labadie's goal. On 12 April 2013 Sheffield United's caretaker manager Chris Morgan recalled Chapell from his loan spell, and he returned to United having played six times for Torquay. The following June Chapell extended his contract with the Blades once more.

=== Torquay United ===
Despite recently agreeing a new deal with Sheffield United, Chapell signed a two-year contract with former loan club Torquay United on 9 July 2013, the Blades allowing him to leave on a free transfer with the promise of a future sell-on payment. Having made his debut in the opening game of the season, Chapell became a regular in the Torquay line up and had scored three goals by the end of August, including two goals in six minutes against Northampton Town.

On 25 March 2015, Chapell joined Conference Premier side Grimsby Town on loan until the end of the season.

=== Non-league ===
In July 2015, Chapell signed for Chester. In November 2017 he joined Stalybridge Celtic on loan. He scored a hat-trick for the Celts in a 5–2 league victory over Lancaster City. He returned to Chester in February 2018, but left the club by mutual consent one month later.

In June 2018, he signed for Matlock Town. In July 2019, he joined Sheffield FC.

== Career statistics ==
As of match played on 7 March 2020

Club	Season	League			FA Cup		League Cup		Other		Total	
Club	Season	Division	Apps	Goals	Apps	Goals	Apps	Goals	Apps	Goals	Apps	Goals
Sheffield United	2010–11	Championship	0	0	0	0	1	0	—		1	0
Sheffield United	2011–12	League One	0	0	1	0	0	0	0	0	1	0
Sheffield United	2012–13	League One	2	0	0	0	0	0	2 (Note: Appearance(s) in Football League Trophy)	0	4	0
Sheffield United	Total		2	0	1	0	1	0	2	0	6	0
Burton Albion (loan)	2012–13	League Two	2	1	2	0	0	0	0	0	4	1
Torquay United (loan)	2012–13	League Two	6	0	0	0	0	0	0	0	6	0
Torquay United	2013–14	League Two	36	5	1	0	1	0	1	0	39	5
Torquay United	2014–15	Conference Premier	23	1	1	0	—		5 (Note: Appearance(s) in FA Trophy)	1	29	2
Torquay United	Total		65	6	2	0	1	0	6	1	74	7
Grimsby Town (loan)	2014–15	Conference Premier	6	1	0	0	—		0	0	6	1
Chester	2015–16	National League	36	3	0	0	—		5 (Note: Three appearances one goal in FA Trophy; two appearances one goal in Cheshire Senior Cup)	2	41	5
Chester	2016–17	National League	24	2	1	0	—		2	1	27	3
Chester	2017–18	National League	9	0	1	0	—		0	0	10	0
Chester	Total		69	5	2	0	—		7	3	78	8
Stalybridge Celtic (loan)	2017–18	Northern Premier League Premier Division	7	4	0	0	—		2	0	9	4
Matlock Town	2018–19	Northern Premier League Premier Division	20	1	0	0	—		5 (Note: One appearance in FA Trophy; one appearance in Northern Premier League Challenge Cup; three appearances in Derbyshire Senior Cup)	0	25	1
Sheffield	2019–20	Northern Premier League Division One South East	18	0	1	0	—		5 (Note: One appearance in FA Trophy; two appearances two goals in Northern Premier League Challenge Cup; two appearances in Sheffield & Hallamshire Senior Cup)	2	24	2
Career total			189	18	8	0	2	0	27	6	226	24
