= Ashley Yeoman =

English footballer

Personal information
- Full name: Ashley Scott Yeoman
- Date of birth: 25 February 1992 (age 34)
- Place of birth: Kingsbridge, England
- Height: 1.78 m (5 ft 10 in)
- Position: Striker

Team information
- Current team: Beesands Rovers

Senior career*
Years	Team	Apps	(Gls)
2008–2015	Torquay United	56	(7)
2010	→ Bideford (loan)	15	(12)
2010–2011	→ Tiverton Town (loan)	3	(0)
2013	→ Bideford (loan)	?	(5)
2014	→ Dorchester Town (loan)	3	(1)
2015	→ Truro City (loan)	3	(0)
2015	→ Bath City (loan)	1	(0)
- * Club domestic league appearances and goals as of 17:15, 3 November 2015 (UTC)

Ashley Scott Yeoman (born 25 February 1992) is an English footballer who plays as a striker.

== Career ==
=== Torquay United ===
Born in Kingsbridge, Yeoman signed for Torquay United on 1 August 2008 and made his debut on 9 October 2008 when he came on as a 70th-minute substitute against Oxford United. He spent time on loan at Southern Football League Premier Division team Tiverton Town and signed a professional contract in May 2010. Yeoman returned to his parent club in early 2011 and he was subsequently named as a substitute on two occasions, firstly on 1 February, a game Torquay lost 3–1 to Hereford United, then exactly a month later in a 1–1 draw against Rotherham United. Previously, Yeoman enjoyed a prolific loan spell at Bideford in 2010.

Yeoman made his Football League debut as a substitute against Bradford City on 18 February 2012 but could not prevent Torquay losing 2–1. That would be his only appearance of the 2011–12 season. The following season, he made another substitute appearance against Leicester City in the League Cup. Yeoman scored his first goal for the club in his third league appearance, once again as a substitute, with a header in the 84th minute of Torquay's 4–3 comeback victory over Aldershot Town.

Yeoman made his FA Cup debut on 3 November 2012, coming on as a substitute in Torquay's 1–0 defeat to Harrogate Town. He also appeared in the Boxing Day Devon Derby against Plymouth Argyle. On New Years Day 2013, Yeoman was handed his first professional start by manager Martin Ling against AFC Wimbledon. Despite a strong performance he had to settle for a further substitute appearance in the following match at Burton Albion.

There would be several more appearances throughout the season, most memorably at Morecambe where he scored the goal that is largely considered to be the goal that avoided relegation. Yeoman would also collect the 'Goal of 2013' award by the Plainmoor faithful for his effort. The town of Salcombe will consider renaming its local football pitch to Yeoman Park in honour of the striker, with towns folk set to vote on the proposal in April 2014.

On 24 May 2013, Ashley signed a new contract for the 2013–14 season under new permanent manager Alan Knill. On 2 October 2013, Yeoman returned to former club Bideford on a three-month loan deal. He scored a hat trick soon after arriving.

After the sacking of Knill, Torquay's latest manager Chris Hargreaves recalled Yeoman as he looked to add fire power ahead of another relegation battle.

On 14 February 2014, Yeoman joined Conference South side Dorchester Town on a one-month loan. After scoring just 1 goal, Yeoman was recalled for the second time in a season. He made his first league appearance of Torquay's 2013/14 season against Bury, where he scored a crucial 90th-minute winner. He added a second goal to his season's tally against local rivals Exeter City and a third goal the following match at Mansfield Town. Despite these goals Torquay United succumbed to relegation.

On 14 May 2014, Yeoman signed a new one-year deal with the Gulls. He went on to make 29 league appearances during the season, largely from the bench, as United finished in a mid-table position in the National League. He managed 2 league goals against Dover Athletic and a late winner versus Lincoln City, while also netting a sensational goal in the FA Trophy at home to Bromley. Sky Sports presenter Helen Chamberlain selected it as her Torquay goal of the season ahead of strikes by Luke Young and Ryan Bowman.

Following the departure of Chris Hargreaves, Yeoman would earn another contract and work with his sixth different manager at the Launa Windows Stadium. Paul Cox had been impressed by a 9-goal spell in only 2 games as an off contract trialist offering him a six-month contract until January, however on 10 December 2015 Ash was released by Torquay United as player-manager Kevin Nicholson said "Ash has been unable to establish a first team regular place, and I feel it will be beneficial for him to go away to play some regular football and score some goals at whatever level that will be" It is very disappointing for Ash as this is the club he came through the youth ranks at 16, Yeoman scored 7 goals in 59 games, and 46 of them as a substitute.
