= Alan Knill =

Wales international footballer

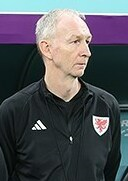
- Knill with Wales at the 2022 FIFA World Cup

Personal information
- Full name: Alan Richard Knill
- Date of birth: 8 October 1964 (age 62)
- Place of birth: Slough, England
- Position: Centre-back

Team information
- Current team: Huddersfield Town (assistant head coach)

Youth career
- 1978–1982: Southampton

Senior career*
Years	Team	Apps	(Gls)
1982–1984	Southampton	0	(0)
1984–1987	Halifax Town	118	(6)
1987–1989	Swansea City	89	(3)
1989–1993	Bury	144	(8)
1993	→ Cardiff City (loan)	4	(0)
1993–1997	Scunthorpe United	130	(8)
1997–2001	Rotherham United	79	(6)
Total		564	(31)

International career
1988	Wales	1	(0)

Managerial career
- 2005: Rotherham United (caretaker)
- 2005–2007: Rotherham United
- 2008–2011: Bury
- 2011–2012: Scunthorpe United
- 2013–2014: Torquay United
- * Club domestic league appearances and goals

Alan Richard Knill (born 8 October 1964) is a professional football manager and former player, who is assistant coach at EFL League One side Huddersfield Town as well as a coach for the Wales national team. He played as a centre-back for several clubs, spending the most time at Halifax Town, Bury and Scunthorpe United. Born in England, he made one appearance for Wales in 1988.

He has also managed his former clubs Rotherham United, Bury, Scunthorpe United and had a short-lived spell at Torquay United.

== Playing career ==
Knill was born in Slough and started his career as a trainee with Southampton in November 1978. He signed as a professional in October 1982, but failed to break into the first–team. He then moved on to Halifax Town (1984–87), Swansea City (1987–89), Bury (1989–93), Cardiff City (1993, on loan), Scunthorpe United (1993–97) and Rotherham United (1997–99).

He also played once for Wales, in a World Cup qualifier against the Netherlands in Amsterdam in September 1988.

== Managerial career ==
Knill was appointed manager of Rotherham United in February 2006, when predecessor Mick Harford was sacked. On 1 March 2007, Knill was sacked as manager of Rotherham, leaving the club bottom of League One and without a win in his final 14 games.

On 17 March 2007, he was appointed to Chesterfield's backroom staff to help newly appointed caretaker manager Lee Richardson try save the Spireites from relegation from League One, but the club were eventually relegated.

On 4 February 2008, he was appointed manager of League Two side Bury. In his first full season in charge, Knill led the Shakers to 4th place in League Two, missing out on automatic promotion by one goal on goal difference. They were then beaten on penalties in a play-off semi final against Shrewsbury Town.

With eight games remaining, and only one point from the play-offs, Alan Knill left Bury to join Scunthorpe United on 31 March 2011. His first game in charge was a 6–0 defeat at the hands of Norwich City, followed by a 4–1 victory over table-topping Queens Park Rangers.

After a difficult start to the 2012 season, Knill believed that life had been put into perspective after narrowly avoiding serious injury after a crash with a squirrel.

Knill was sacked as Scunthorpe manager on 29 October 2012 and replaced by Brian Laws.

On 20 February 2013, Torquay United appointed Knill as caretaker manager in place of Martin Ling, who had gone on sick leave. Knill's objective was to keep The Gulls in the football league and that was achieved on the final day of the season with a 3–3 draw at home to Bristol Rovers. Knill saw his efforts with Torquay as a success, and felt he had "improved his CV" by helping the club avoid relegation. On 7 May 2013, he was appointed the permanent manager of Torquay. Knill was sacked on 2 January 2014 with the club having won only five league games in the 2013–14 season and sitting 23rd in League Two.

On 27 January 2014, Knill was made assistant to the new Northampton Town manager Chris Wilder, who had been Knill's assistant at Bury. He then followed Wilder to become his assistant manager at Sheffield United in May 2016. On 7 November 2021, he linked up with Wilder for a third time, becoming the assistant manager at Championship side Middlesbrough.

In August 2021, he joined the backroom staff of the Wales national team under manager Rob Page. In March 2023, Knill joined Championship side Watford, again working as assistant to Wilder, the newly appointed head coach.

In December 2023, Wilder and Knill rejoined Sheffield United. In June 2026, Knill departed the Blades.

On 20 July 2026, he joined EFL League One side Huddersfield Town as the assistant coach to Martin Drury.

== Managerial statistics ==
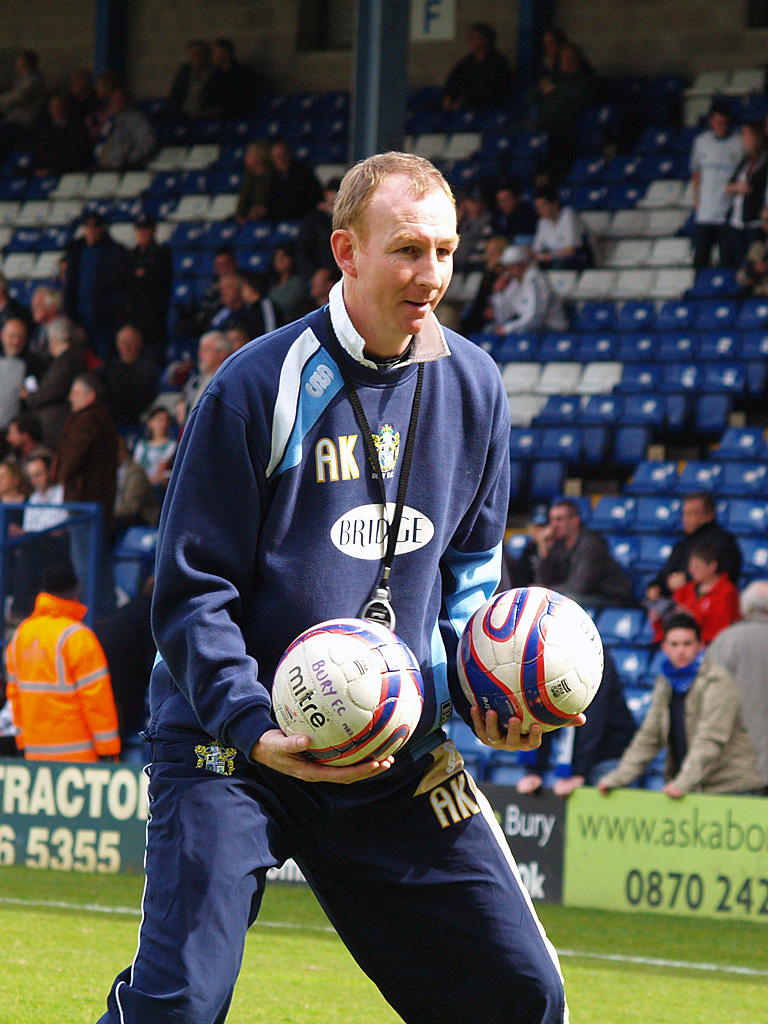
Knill as manager of Bury in 2008

As of 2 January 2014.

Team	Nat	From	To	Record				
Team	Nat	From	To	G	W	D	L	Win %
Rotherham United (caretaker)	(England)	31 January 2005	7 April 2005	11	2	2	7	18.18
Rotherham United	(England)	10 December 2005	1 March 2007	64	18	17	29	28.13
Bury	(England)	4 February 2008	31 March 2011	165	71	44	50	43.03
Scunthorpe United	(England)	31 March 2011	29 October 2012	78	16	30	32	20.51
Torquay United	(England)	20 February 2013	2 January 2014	41	9	12	20	21.95
Total				359	116	105	138	32.31

== Honours ==
=== As a player ===
Swansea City

- Football League Fourth Division play-offs: 1988

=== As a manager ===
Individual

- Football League One Manager of the Month: October 2006
- Football League Two Manager of the Month: September 2008, January 2009, October 2010
