= 2011–12 Torquay United F.C. season =

Torquay United
2011–12 season
- Chairman: Simon Baker
- Manager: Martin Ling
- League Two: 5th
- FA Cup: Second Round
- League Cup: First Round
- League Trophy: First Round
- Top goalscorer: League: Rene Howe & Lee Mansell (12); All: Rene Howe (14)
- Highest home attendance: 4,157 vs. Swindon Town, 26 December 2011 (League Two)
- Lowest home attendance: 2,018 vs. Cheltenham Town, 13 September 2011 (League Two)
- Average home league attendance: 2,869
Home colours	Away colours	Third colours

The 2011–12 Torquay United F.C. season was Torquay United's 76th season in the Football League and their third consecutive season in League Two. The season runs from 1 July 2011 to 30 June 2012.

== Overview ==
Having narrowly missed out on promotion to League One after defeat by Stevenage in the previous season's League Two play-off final, the 2011–12 season represents a new era for Torquay United with the departure of manager Paul Buckle and several of the squad who had taken part in last season's promotion challenge. As well as new manager Martin Ling having to rebuild the squad on the pitch, literal rebuilding off the pitch has started with the demolition of the old grandstand at Plainmoor and the construction of a new one, to be named 'Bristow's Bench' in honour of Torquay's late vice-chairman Paul Bristow.

== League statistics ==
=== League Two ===
Pos	Team	Pld	W	D	L	GF	GA	GD	Pts	Promotion, qualification or relegation
3	Crawley Town (P)	46	23	15	8	76	54	+22	84	Promotion to Football League One
4	Southend United	46	25	8	13	77	48	+29	83	Qualification for League Two play-offs (Note: Four teams play for one spot and promotion to Football League One.)
5	Torquay United	46	23	12	11	63	50	+13	81	Qualification for League Two play-offs
6	Cheltenham Town	46	23	8	15	66	50	+16	77	Qualification for League Two play-offs
7	Crewe Alexandra (O, P)	46	20	12	14	67	59	+8	72	Qualification for League Two play-offs

Updated to match(es) played on 5 May 2012. Source: BBC Sport
Rules for classification: 1) Points; 2) Goal difference; 3) Number of goals scored
(O) Play-off winners; (P) Promoted

==== Results summary ====
Overall								Home						Away					
Pld	W	D	L	GF	GA	GD	Pts	W	D	L	GF	GA	GD	W	D	L	GF	GA	GD
46	23	12	11	63	50	+13	81	12	8	3	36	23	+13	11	4	8	27	27	0

Source: Torquay United

==== Results by round ====
Round	1	2	3	4	5	6	7	8	9	10	11	12	13	14	15	16	17	18	19	20	21	22	23	24	25	26	27	28	29	30	31	32	33	34	35	36	37	38	39	40	41	42	43	44	45	46
Ground	H	A	A	H	A	H	A	H	H	A	H	A	H	A	H	H	A	H	A	H	A	H	H	A	A	A	H	H	H	A	H	A	A	H	H	A	A	A	H	A	H	A	H	A	H	A
Result	D	W	W	L	D	W	D	D	D	L	D	L	L	L	W	W	W	W	D	W	L	W	D	W	W	W	W	W	W	W	L	L	W	W	D	W	W	L	W	W	W	D	D	L	D	L
Position	12	6	4	9	12	4	6	6	10	13	13	14	16	18	15	13	12	10	10	9	12	10	10	9	8	6	6	5	4	3	5	6	5	5	5	2	2	2	2	2	2	2	3	4	4	5

Source: Torquay United
A = Away; H = Home; W = Win; D = Draw; L = Loss

== Season diary ==
=== July ===
Following the acquisitions in June of Joe Oastler, Chris McPhee and Daniel Leadbitter, Martin Ling further bolstered the Torquay United squad with two crucial defensive signings in goalkeeper Bobby Olejnik and centre back Brian Saah. Olejnik came with a fine pedigree having played for Falkirk in the Scottish Premier League while Saah had previously played under Ling at Leyton Orient and Cambridge United. With Chris Zebroski making the decision to follow former manager Paul Buckle to Bristol Rovers, Ling needed to improve his attacking options which led to the signings of strikers Rene Howe and Taiwo Atieno and midfielder Ian Morris. Finally, as back-up to Bobby Olejnik, former Gulls keeper Martin Rice returned to Plainmoor after two seasons with Truro City.

A series of friendlies saw the new recruits bed in well with the established squad members with Howe, Atieno, McPhee, Oastler and Morris all helping themselves to goals in a pre-season programme which saw the Gulls lose just once (to Championship side Burnley). Particularly pleasing to Torquay supporters were the defeat of another Championship side Bristol City and a 3–0 victory over bitter rivals Exeter City. The pre-season fixtures ended with a 6–2 win over Truro City, who included among their ranks the young defender Ed Palmer who had only just joined the Cornish club on loan from Torquay.

With Martin Ling seemingly satisfied with his squad, Torquay supporters now braced themselves for another season.

=== August ===
The optimism of the new season was swiftly dashed when striker Justin Richards scored twice early in the second half to put Burton Albion 2–0 ahead in the opening day fixture at Plainmoor. However, Torquay were able to show enough character to respond to this setback with Rene Howe and captain Lee Mansell both scoring to salvage a 2–2 draw. Next up was a trip to St Mary's for a Carling Cup First Round fixture with Southampton. Despite a spirited performance, the Gulls were unable to overcome a strong Saints side and had to accept a 4–1 defeat as well as the fact that Torquay had now gone ten years without reaching the Second Round of the League Cup. However, the Gulls did not have to wait much longer for their first victory of the season and it was to be a particularly enjoyable one for the Torquay fans as it came at the home of Paul Buckle's new side Bristol Rovers. Goals from Taiwo Atieno and Rene Howe in the first fifteen minutes was enough to secure all three points at the Memorial Stadium, despite Byron Anthony snatching one back for Rovers in the second half. Back to back away victories were then achieved with a hard-fought 1–0 win at Aldershot, pushing the Gulls up to 4th in the League Two table. However, Torquay were soon brought back down to earth when newly promoted Crawley Town came to Plainmoor and easily outplayed the home side in a 3–1 defeat of the Gulls. The consolation goal was Lee Mansell's fourth of the campaign and left the midfielder in the unlikely position as the club's top scorer for the season so far.

Spirits were raised after that defeat with the loan signing of promising young forward Billy Bodin from Swindon Town. However, it soon became clear that he had arrived as a replacement for his namesake Billy Kee who was sold to Burton Albion the very next day. Kee had struggled to secure a place in the starting line up under Paul Buckle and, with Howe and Atieno beginning to establish an effective striking partnership under Martin Ling, Kee took the opportunity to join the Brewers and return to his native Midlands. Some pride was restored after the Crawley humiliation with a 1–1 draw at Dagenham & Redbridge, leaving the Gulls' undefeated away record intact, at least as far as the League was concerned. However, a trip to Whaddon Road in the Johnstone Paints Trophy saw another early cup exit for Torquay at the hands of Cheltenham Town.

While the cup defeats were disappointing, it was clear that Martin Ling's focus was firmly on the League campaign. Two wins, two draws and one defeat represented a solid start to the season and the overall performances of the new look Torquay squad suggested that there were perhaps more reasons for the Gulls fans to be positive than not.

=== September ===
With Rene Howe suffering from a hamstring injury and Billy Bodin on international duty with the Wales under-21 squad, Martin Ling was presented with a mini striker crisis before the visit of Macclesfield Town for the first fixture of the month. Despite this, Torquay managed to register their biggest win of the campaign so far with a 3–0 defeat of the Silkmen thanks to first goals of the season from Brian Saah, Chris McPhee and Eunan O'Kane. Howe was fit enough to be restored to the starting line-up alongside Bodin for the next match which, ironically, resulted in a lacklustre 0–0 draw with Northampton Town at the Sixfields Stadium. This was then followed up by two further draws against Cheltenham Town and Rotherham United, both at Plainmoor. Although these were far more entertaining matches than the Northampton stalemate, it was concerning that Torquay had fallen behind within the first five minutes of both games. However, the Gulls did at least show the desire to fight back in both games, gaining a 2–2 result against Cheltenham and finishing the epic Rotherham encounter with a 3–3 scoreline. Nevertheless, Martin Ling was now growing concerned at the prospect of Torquay becoming the League's 'draw specialists'.

Morale was boosted before the trip to Shrewsbury Town with the news that Eunan O'Kane had signed a new contract keeping the midfielder at Plainmoor until 2014. However, it was not such good news on the pitch with the Shrews gaining revenge for last season's play-off defeat, beating the Gulls 2–0 in a match which also saw Rene Howe dismissed for a second bookable offence. It was a disappointing end to a month which left the Gulls in 13th position in the League Two table having started it in 12th. It was now becoming clear that if Torquay were to avoid a season of mid-table mediocrity (or worse), they would need to start converting some of their draws into wins.

=== October ===
If Torquay United were hoping their indifferent fortunes would improve with the start of a new month, they were to be sorely disappointed. Early in the month the team received a blow with the news that midfielder Ian Morris had picked up a knee injury which threatened to rule him out for at least a couple of months. On the pitch, despite holding league leaders Morecambe to a 1–1 draw at Plainmoor in their opening fixture of the month, the Gulls would then go on to lose their next three matches against Bradford City, Gillingham and Southend United by an aggregate margin of 10–3. Perhaps the most disappointing result of the three was the 1–0 defeat by Bradford at Valley Parade. Even with the Bantams being reduced to ten men after just 24 minutes, Torquay were still unable to penetrate a defence which had not kept a clean sheet in their previous 18 league games. The following weeks's humiliating 5–2 home defeat by Gillingham prompted Martin Ling to recall out of favour defender Mark Ellis to the starting line up in the away fixture against Southend. Although that game resulted in another expensive defeat, the final two fixtures of the month suggested Ling might have finally got the formula right with back to back home victories against AFC Wimbledon and Hereford United, both without conceding a goal.

Those two victories provided boost to Torquay after eight game stretch without a win. The Gulls were hopeful they could create a platform from which the team could progress. They could at least distance themselves from any potential relegation.

=== November ===
November saw Torquay continue to build upon the foundations laid in the last two matches of October. Following the wins over AFC Wimbledon and Hereford, the Gulls went to Gresty Road and recorded a convincing 3–0 win over Crewe Alexandra. This was followed up by an equally impressive FA Cup first round victory over League One side Chesterfield at the B2net Stadium. The 3–1 win earned Torquay a potentially difficult tie in the Second Round with a trip to another League One outfit, Sheffield United.

While the Chesterfield match saw the earlier than expected return from injury of Ian Morris, the Gulls' next League encounter resulted in another long-term injury with defender Brian Saah picking up a serious tear to his groin. Although there was a ready-made replacement in Chris Robertson (who had recently lost his place in the team to Mark Ellis), the possible length of Saah's absence prompted Martin Ling to bring in young Colchester United defender Tom Aldred as cover until January. However, Saah's injury was probably the only negative point to a game which saw Torquay achieve their first League win over Devon rivals Plymouth Argyle since 1972. A stunning second half brace from Eunan O'Kane helped the Gulls record a 3–1 victory over a Pilgrims side who were languishing at the bottom of League Two having only just been relegated from League One the previous season.

The final game of the month saw Torquay make a Friday night trip to Port Vale which, although only resulting in a goalless draw, did at least extend the Gulls' unbeaten run to six games in all competitions, with fifteen goals scored and just two conceded. With Torquay's bad run of form now a fading memory, there was reason again for the Plainmoor faithful to be optimistic.

=== December ===
Torquay could hardly have asked for a much tougher FA Cup second-round fixture than a trip to League One high-flyers Sheffield United. However, it would take just three minutes before Rene Howe stunned the Bramall Lane crowd by firing the Gulls into an early 1–0 lead. United managed to defend stoutly against the Blades up until the 68th minute when a cruel Mark Ellis own goal levelled it for the home side before striker Ched Evans made it 2–1 within a minute of the restart. Evans then went on to score a second goal to put the tie beyond the reach of Torquay before Danny Stevens scored a late consolation goal in injury time. It was an impressive Torquay performance but the defeat meant that the Gulls would now only have the League Two campaign to concentrate on for the rest of the season.

Despite the cup exit, spirits were raised among the Torquay fans when it was announced that loyal servants Lee Mansell and Kevin Nicholson had both signed new contracts keeping them at Plainmoor until the summer of 2014. Nicholson celebrated his new deal by scoring deep into injury time to secure a 1–0 home win over Barnet. However, this was then followed up by a poor performance against Accrington Stanley at the Crown Ground which saw Rene Howe sent off for the second time in the season. Despite Accrington also later having a man sent off, the game resulted in a 3–1 defeat for Torquay and a four-match ban for Howe. Howe's suspension meant an opportunity for striker Taiwo Atieno to make his mark in the team having failed to find a regular place in the starting line up. Atieno duly took his chance by scoring the only goal in the 1–0 defeat of Swindon in the Boxing Day fixture at Plainmoor, thus ending the Robins' 15-game unbeaten run.

Although 2011 would end on a slightly dull note with a somewhat uninspiring 0–0 home draw with Oxford United, with just three points separating themselves from the play-off positions, Martin Ling and the Torquay fans could reflect upon a wholly satisfying first half of the season.

=== January ===
Torquay got the New Year off to a flying start with a 2–1 victory over Plymouth Argyle. It was the first time the Gulls had completed the League double over their Devon neighbours for over 40 years and their first win of any description at Home Park since January 2000. The scoring was opened by Billy Bodin and it was to be his last contribution to the Gulls before he returned to Swindon Town following the completion of his loan deal. Despite Martin Ling's best efforts, Robins boss Paolo Di Canio was reluctant to let Bodin return to Plainmoor, particularly with Torquay's recent good form making them potential rivals in the promotion race. With Brian Saah coming back to full fitness, defender Tom Aldred also returned to his parent club without making an appearance for the Gulls while Ed Palmer, Ray Spear and Lloyd Macklin all returned to Torquay following their loan spells at Truro, Bideford and Salisbury City respectively.

As Torquay's next scheduled League opponents Dagenham & Redbridge were still involved in the FA Cup, Torquay were able to enjoy an unexpected mid-winter break before the trip to Macclesfield Town. The 12-day hiatus didn't seem to do the Gulls any harm as they returned from Moss Rose with another 2–1 victory thanks to the first goals of the season from Mark Ellis and Ian Morris. Underlining the team's current consistency, this was then followed up by a third consecutive 2–1 away win at Morecambe with Ellis again getting on the score sheet. Torquay's rearranged fixture against Dagenham resulted in a hard-fought 1–0 victory, while a similarly dogged performance from Northampton Town four days later saw another narrow 1–0 victory for the Gulls and a third goal in four games for defender Ellis. It was Torquay's fifth consecutive victory and left them firmly in the play-off spots.

With the January transfer window open, Martin Ling had anticipated interest in his players, particularly with the side's current excellent form. When the inevitable enquiries came, it was defender Chris Robertson who had attracted the attention of other clubs. One of Torquay's longest serving players, Robertson's contract was due to expire in the summer and the Gulls took the option of accepting an undisclosed fee from League One side Preston North End for the player's services.

Despite the departure of Robertson and the unlikely return of Bodin, the transfer window closed with the squad still in good shape. With 11 victories in 14 games, Torquay were now in an excellent position to continue their push for promotion to League One.

=== February ===
The icing on the cake for a near perfect January was the 'clean sweep' of Manager of the Month Award for Martin Ling and Player of the Month Award for centre back Mark Ellis. Fears of the 'curse' often associated with the Manager's award proved unfounded with Torquay stretching the winning run of games to seven with two more victories over promotion-chasing Shrewsbury and Cheltenham by a goal to nil. In fact, the trip to Whaddon Road was the Gulls' fourth successive 1–0 victory and brought Torquay within one game of equalling the club record of eight successive wins achieved during the 1997–98 season.

With the squad now missing Chris Robertson and Billy Bodin, Martin Ling sought to bring in replacements for the departed pair. First in was former Wales under-21 winger Nathan Craig. Currently a free agent, Craig had impressed Ling while playing for the reserves and was offered what amounted to an extended trial until the end of the season. Another new face arrived in the shape of defender Angus MacDonald who was brought in on loan from Reading for the rest of the season. The new players had yet to make an appearance before Torquay's run of good form came to a shuddering halt with a surprise 2–1 defeat at Plainmoor to struggling Bradford City. Fans may well have been wondering if they were feeling the delayed effects of the Manager of the Month 'curse' when the Gulls suffered a second successive loss away to Gillingham. The 2–0 defeat at Priestfield ended in bizarre circumstances with the assistant referee flagging for a penalty when Brian Saah had seemingly brought down former Gulls-loanee Gavin Tomlin in the penalty box. However, referee Jock Waugh (who had originally waved play-on) decided to send off Joe Oastler instead of Saah. However, following an appeal, the FA rectified the error and the one-match ban was switched from Oastler to Saah.

Although it was inevitable that the incredible run of form would eventually come to an end, Torquay now had to return to winning ways as soon as possible if they were to maintain their bid for promotion.

=== March ===
With a daunting eight fixtures scheduled for the month, Martin Ling endeavoured to strengthen the squad with the signing of Ryan Jarvis on loan from League One Walsall. Jarvis had previously played under Ling at Leyton Orient but had recently failed to cement a regular place in the Saddlers' first team and so was allowed to the join the Gulls until the end of the season. Jarvis made his Torquay debut when he came on as a sub for the injured Danny Stevens in the month's first fixture, a tricky tie away to Crawley Town. Also making his debut for the Gulls was Angus MacDonald who came in for the suspended Brian Saah. The young defender gave an assured performance in his first ever League appearance to help Torquay gain a 1–0 victory over their promotion-chasing rivals. It was a particularly satisfying result for the Torquay fans after August's humiliating 3–1 defeat at Plainmoor and the previous season's FA Cup exit.

This was followed by back-to-back home games against Aldershot, where another 1–0 win sealed the points for the Gulls, and Bristol Rovers. Although the Rovers match possibly lost some of the edge it may have had if Paul Buckle were still in charge of the Pirates, the tie still resulted in a thrilling spectacle with Plainmoor old boy Chris Zebroski putting Rovers 2–0 ahead in the 69th minute. However, Torquay refused to be beaten and two goals in the last twenty minutes from captain Lee Mansell ensured the Gulls salvaged a point from the encounter.

Torquay were back on the road again for their next three fixtures, the first of which was a midweek trip up to Rotherham's Don Valley Stadium. Again, Lee Mansell was the man on the score sheet in another 1–0 victory for the Gulls. If the Rotherham match was a demonstration of Torquay's dogged defending, their next match provided a display of the team's attacking prowess with a comfortable 4–1 victory over Burton Albion at the Pirelli Stadium. It was to be manager Paul Peschisolido's last game in charge of the Brewers as he was sacked shortly afterwards. Coincidentally, Torquay's previous opponents Rotherham also parted company with their manager Andy Scott just two days later. Although it's unlikely that Swindon boss Paolo Di Canio would have been fearing for his own position when the Gulls arrived at the County Ground, he would certainly have been aware of the Torquay threat with the side now second in the table just behind Di Canio's men. However, it was to prove a disappointing evening for the Gulls who were defeated 2–0 by the League leaders. Fears that Torquay's bubble may finally have burst began to emerge after Port Vale went in 1–0 up at half time in their match at Plainmoor. Yet again however, Martin Ling's men proved they had the spirit for the fight and came back to win the match 2–1 in the second half, the winner being Ryan Jarvis's first goal for the club. An exhausting month finally came to an end with yet another 1–0 win against Barnet at Underhill.

Torquay recorded six wins and one defeat in eight games, leaving the club in the automatic promotion places with six games remaining.

=== April ===
For the second time during the season, Torquay achieved a clean sweep in the monthly awards with Martin Ling recognised as the League Two Manager of the Month again, this time being joined by captain Lee Mansell as the League's Player of the Month. Torquay's achievements received further recognition when Bobby Olejnik, Kevin Nicholson, Eunan O'Kane and Lee Mansell were all selected in the PFA League Two Team of the Year. Having four players included in the season's 11-man squad was an astonishing accomplishment matched only by Manchester City in the Premier League and Charlton Athletic in League One. Nevertheless, despite all the awards, Torquay still had to focus on their fight for promotion to ensure that the season's efforts would not be wasted.

The march towards League One continued unabated with the Gulls' Good Friday encounter with Accrington resulting in the side's tenth 1–0 win of the season. However, despite an early Rene Howe goal in the Easter Monday fixture with Oxford United, Torquay were perhaps fortunate to leave the Kassam Stadium with a point after Ian Morris was sent off in the 79th minute. Only a late Taiwo Atieno strike salvaged a 2–2 draw for the Gulls after Oxford had already fought back to a 2–1 lead before the sending off. However, the point did at least secure Torquay a place in the play-offs, although their sights were now firmly set on a much bigger prize. The month's next fixture saw the visit of promotion-chasing rivals Southend to Plainmoor. The two sides cancelled each other out in a 0–0 draw which did at least establish a new club record of 20 clean sheets in one season. The draw just managed to keep the Gulls in the automatic promotion spots although with both Shrewsbury and Crawley both winning their games in hand shortly afterwards, Torquay had dropped down to fourth spot before their trip to AFC Wimbledon. A disappointing 2–0 defeat at Kingsmeadow did nothing to help the team's promotion prospects and appeared to suggest that Torquay's small squad may finally be running out of steam at the crucial moment. However, the following week the Gulls seemed to have all three points in the bag back at home when they were 1–0 up against play-off hopefuls Crewe Alexandra before a 94th equaliser from Nick Powell robbed Torquay of two vital points. Other results on the penultimate day of the season ensured Swindon were crowned champions of League Two while Shrewsbury became the second team to win automatic promotion. However, a shock home defeat for Crawley at the hands of relegation threatened Hereford meant that only goal difference separated Torquay and Crawley for the vital third automatic promotion spot. Meanwhile, just a point behind them both were Southend who could grab the coveted third spot if they won and Torquay and Crawley both failed to do so. What would make the final day even more intriguing was that Torquay had to travel to Crawley's victors Hereford who themselves would have to win their final match of the season to guarantee their League Two survival.

As had so often been the case throughout the years, Torquay's destiny would have to be decided on the final day of the season.

== Results ==
=== League Two ===
6 Aug 2011	Torquay United	2–2	Burton Albion	Plainmoor
15:00 BST	Howe 59'; Mansell (yellow card) 70' (goal) 81'	Report	Stanton (yellow card) 21'; Richards 49' 53'; Parkes (yellow card) 64' (yellow-red card) 83'; Corbett (yellow card) 89'	Attendance: 3,142; Referee: Danny McDermid

13 Aug 2011	Bristol Rovers	1–2	Torquay United	Memorial Stadium
15:00 BST	Stanley (yellow card) 23'; Carayol (yellow card) 32'; Anthony 56'	Report	Atieno 11'; Howe 15' (pen.); Mansell (yellow card) 43'	Attendance: 8,427; Referee: Jonathan Moss

16 Aug 2011	Aldershot Town	0–1	Torquay United	Recreation Ground
19:45 BST		Report	Mansell 36'; Morris (yellow card) 73'	Attendance: 2,236; Referee: Steven Rushton

20 Aug 2011	Torquay United	1–3	Crawley Town	Plainmoor
15:00 BST	Howe (yellow card) 45+1'; Mansell 50' (yellow card) 90'; Robertson (yellow card) 60'; O'Kane (yellow card) 69'	Report	Davies 4' (yellow card) 64'; Wassmer 44'; McFadzean (yellow card) 45'; Simpson 46'; Thomas (yellow card) 57'	Attendance: 2,658; Referee: James Adcock

27 Aug 2011	Dagenham & Redbridge	1–1	Torquay United	Victoria Road
15:00 BST	Williams 25'; Arber (yellow card) 79'; Ogogo (yellow card) 83'	Report	O'Kane (yellow card) 41'; Howe 79' (pen.)	Attendance: 2,012; Referee: Darren Sheldrake

3 Sep 2011	Torquay United	3–0	Macclesfield Town	Plainmoor
15:00 BST	Morris (yellow card) 55'; Saah 63'; McPhee 75'; O'Kane 90'	Report	Kay (yellow card) 41'	Attendance: 2,307; Referee: Iain Williamson

10 Sep 2011	Northampton Town	0–0	Torquay United	Sixfields Stadium
15:00 BST	Corker (yellow card) 83'	Report	Lathrope (yellow card) 74'	Attendance: 4,036; Referee: Bobby Madley

13 Sep 2011	Torquay United	2–2	Cheltenham Town	Plainmoor
19:45 BST	Bodin 6'; Nicholson 71'; Lathrope (yellow card) 90+3'	Report	Low 4'; Pack (yellow card) 13'; Mohamed 45+1'	Attendance: 2,018; Referee: Andy Woolmer

17 Sep 2011	Torquay United	3–3	Rotherham United	Plainmoor
15:00 BST	Bodin 11'; Nicholson 41'; Howe 47'; O'Kane (yellow card) 84'	Report	Grabban 3' 34'; Cresswell 9'; Raynes (yellow card) 70'	Attendance: 2,330; Referee: Lee Collins

24 Sep 2011	Shrewsbury Town	2–0	Torquay United	New Meadow
15:00 BST	Collins 6' 49'; Hazell (yellow card) 63'; Smith (yellow card) 84'	Report	Howe (yellow card) 52' (yellow-red card) 90+1'	Attendance: 5,263; Referee: Steve Rushton

1 Oct 2011	Torquay United	1–1	Morecambe	Plainmoor
15:00 BST	Mansell 62'	Report	Wilson (yellow card) 25'; Ellison 82'	Attendance: 2,207; Referee: Roger East

8 Oct 2011	Bradford City	1–0	Torquay United	Valley Parade
15:00 BST	Davies (red card) 24'; Fagan 38'; Flynn (yellow card) 41'; Reid (yellow card) 67'	Report	Oastler (yellow card) 32'; Howe (yellow card) 45'; Macklin (yellow card) 67'; O'Kane (yellow card) 68'	Attendance: 11,738; Referee: Carl Boyeson

15 Oct 2011	Torquay United	2–5	Gillingham	Plainmoor
15:00 BST	Howe (yellow card) 43'; Robertson 47'; Stevens 51'	Report	Kuffour 6' 39'; Rooney 56' (pen.); Richards (yellow card) 58'; Montrose (yellow card) 71'; Nouble 78'; Whelpdale 89'	Attendance: 2,582; Referee: Oliver Langford

22 Oct 2011	Southend United	4–1	Torquay United	Roots Hall
15:00 BST	Kalala (yellow card) 43'; Ferdinand 47' 54'; Phillips (yellow card) 57' (goal) 71'; Dickinson 66'	Report	Oastler (yellow card) 34'; Mansell 77'	Attendance: 5,425; Referee: Darren Deadman

25 Oct 2011	Torquay United	4–0	AFC Wimbledon	Plainmoor
19:45 BST	Stevens 32'; O'Kane 43'; Howe 45' 56'	Report	Hatton (yellow card) 76'; Stuart (yellow card) 83'	Attendance: 2,353; Referee: Brendan Malone

29 Oct 2011	Torquay United	2–0	Hereford United	Plainmoor
15:00 BST	Nicholson 40'; Bodin 44'; Lathrope (yellow card) 52'	Report	Leslie (yellow card) 45'; Green (yellow card) 83'	Attendance: 2,459; Referee: Fred Graham

5 Nov 2011	Crewe Alexandra	0–3	Torquay United	Alexandra Stadium
15:00 GMT		Report	Howe 9'; Oastler (yellow card) 48'; Mansell 53'; Bodin 68'	Attendance: 3,521; Referee: Geoff Eltringham

19 Nov 2011	Torquay United	3–1	Plymouth Argyle	Plainmoor
15:00 GMT	Saah (yellow card) 25'; O'Kane 47' 49' (yellow card) 50'; Stevens 68'	Report	Gibson (yellow card) 28'; Atkinson (yellow card) 71' (goal) 78'	Attendance: 3,983; Referee: Jock Waugh

25 Nov 2011	Port Vale	0–0	Torquay United	Vale Park
19:45 GMT	Pope (yellow card) 90'	Report	Bodin (yellow card) 52'; Lathrope (yellow card) 63'	Attendance: 5,168; Referee: Keith Stroud

9 Dec 2011	Torquay United	1–0	Barnet	Plainmoor
19:45 GMT	Mansell (yellow card) 45+1'; O'Kane (yellow card) 68'; Nicholson 90+4'	Report		Attendance: 2,125; Referee: David Phillips

17 Dec 2011	Accrington Stanley	3–1	Torquay United	Crown Ground
15:00 GMT	Hughes 13'; Dunbavin (yellow card) 53'; Stockley 62'; Joyce (red card) 78'; Long 89'	Report	Oastler (yellow card) 35'; Howe (red card) 39'; McPhee 90+1'	Attendance: 1,404; Referee: Andrew Madley

26 Dec 2011	Torquay United	1–0	Swindon Town	Plainmoor
15:00 GMT	Atieno 34'; Lathrope (yellow card) 53'; Ellis (yellow card) 82'	Report		Attendance: 4,157; Referee: Steve Tanner

31 Dec 2011	Torquay United	0–0	Oxford United	Plainmoor
13:00 GMT	Morris (yellow card) 25'; Mansell (yellow card) 49'; Lathrope (yellow card) 79'	Report		Attendance: 3,043; Referee: Keith Stroud

2 Jan 2012	Plymouth Argyle	1–2	Torquay United	Home Park
15:00 GMT	Young 72'	Report	O'Kane (yellow card) 45+1'; Bodin 58'; Mansell 64'	Attendance: 12,836; Referee: Anthony Bates

14 Jan 2012	Macclesfield Town	1–2	Torquay United	Moss Rose
15:00 GMT	Donnelly (yellow card) 42'; Brisley 81'	Report	Morris 52'; Ellis 74'; Rowe-Turner (yellow card) 90'	Attendance: 1,878; Referee: David Webb

21 Jan 2012	Morecambe	1–2	Torquay United	Globe Arena
15:00 GMT	Jevons 88'	Report	Ellis 17'; Robertson (yellow card) 76'; Stevens 81'	Attendance: 1,800; Referee: Carl Boyeson

24 Jan 2012	Torquay United	1–0	Dagenham & Redbridge	Plainmoor
19:45 GMT	Mansell 40'; Atieno (yellow card) 71'	Report	Spillane (yellow card) 66'	Attendance: 2,280; Referee: Trevor Kettle

28 Jan 2012	Torquay United	1–0	Northampton Town	Plainmoor
15:00 GMT	Ellis 75'	Report	Webster (yellow card) 36'	Attendance: 2,719; Referee: James Linington

11 Feb 2012	Torquay United	1–0	Shrewsbury Town	Plainmoor
15:00 GMT	Ellis (yellow card) 45'; Atieno 68'	Report	Collins (yellow card) 88'	Attendance: 2,592; Referee: Gavin Ward

14 Feb 2012	Cheltenham Town	0–1	Torquay United	Whaddon Road
19:45 GMT	Spencer (yellow card) 74'; Mohamed (yellow card) 75'	Report	Morris 33'; Stevens (yellow card) 61'	Attendance: 3,010; Referee: Robert Lewis

18 Feb 2012	Torquay United	1–2	Bradford City	Plainmoor
15:00 GMT	Stevens 12'	Report	Fagan 17'; Reid 20'	Attendance: 2,566; Referee: Patrick Miller

25 Feb 2012	Gillingham	2–0	Torquay United	Priestfield Stadium
15:00 GMT	King 51'; Payne (yellow card) 74'; Gazzaniga (yellow card) 85'; Kedwell 90+4' (pen.)	Report	Howe (yellow card) 5'; Oastler (red card) 90+3'	Attendance: 4,865; Referee: Jock Waugh

3 Mar 2012	Crawley Town	0–1	Torquay United	Broadfield Stadium
15:00 GMT		Report	Oastler (yellow card) 30'; MacDonald (yellow card) 52'; O'Kane 79'	Attendance: 3,361; Referee: Simon Hooper

6 Mar 2012	Torquay United	1–0	Aldershot Town	Plainmoor
19:45 GMT	Howe 7'	Report		Attendance: 2,277; Referee: David Coote

10 Mar 2012	Torquay United	2–2	Bristol Rovers	Plainmoor
15:00 GMT	Saah (yellow card) 19'; Mansell 72' 90'	Report	Carayol (yellow card) 29'; Harrold 45'; Gill (yellow card) 51'; Zebroski 69'	Attendance: 3,920; Referee: Michael Naylor

13 Mar 2012	Rotherham United	0–1	Torquay United	Don Valley Stadium
19:45 GMT		Report	Mansell 26'	Attendance: 2,538; Referee: Gary Sutton

17 Mar 2012	Burton Albion	1–4	Torquay United	Pirelli Stadium
15:00 GMT	Richards 69'; Dyer (yellow card) 72'	Report	Stevens 7'; Lathrope (yellow card) 29'; Mansell 36'; Howe 82'; Atieno 87'	Attendance: 2,397; Referee: Tony Bates

20 Mar 2012	Swindon Town	2–0	Torquay United	County Ground
19:45 GMT	Connell 33'; Risser 58'	Report		Attendance: 8,351; Referee: Lee Collins

24 Mar 2012	Torquay United	2–1	Port Vale	Plainmoor
15:00 GMT	Howe 71' (pen.) (yellow card) 78'; Jarvis 74'; O'Kane (yellow card) 75'	Report	McCombe 29'; Yates (yellow card) 45'; Shuker (yellow card) 48'; Davis (red card) 69'	Attendance: 3,136; Referee: Darren Sheldrake

30 Mar 2012	Barnet	0–1	Torquay United	Underhill Stadium
20:00 BST	Saville (yellow card) 70'	Report	Olejnik (yellow card) 25'; Stevens 49'	Attendance: 2,263; Referee: Fred Graham

6 Apr 2012	Torquay United	1–0	Accrington Stanley	Plainmoor
15:00 BST	Lathrope (yellow card) 14'; Ellis (yellow card) 37'; Howe 73'; Oastler (yellow card) 82'	Report	Dunbavin (yellow card) 53'; Murphy (yellow card) 60'; Liddle (yellow card) 90+4'	Attendance: 3,934; Referee: Keith Stroud

9 Apr 2012	Oxford United	2–2	Torquay United	Kassam Stadium
15:00 BST	Chapman 59'; Montaño 68'; Whing (yellow card) 79'	Report	Howe 17'; Morris (yellow card) 72' (yellow-red card) 79'; Mansell (yellow card) 81'; Atieno 90'	Attendance: 7,867; Referee: Dean Mohareb

14 Apr 2012	Torquay United	0–0	Southend United	Plainmoor
15:00 BST	Lathrope (yellow card) 34'; Howe (yellow card) 76'; Mansell (yellow card) 83'; Ellis (yellow card) 90'	Report	Mohsni (yellow card) 45'	Attendance: 3,408; Referee: Mark Heywood

21 Apr 2012	AFC Wimbledon	2–0	Torquay United	Kingsmeadow
15:00 BST	Yussuff 79'; Bush (yellow card) 85'; Moncur 85' (yellow card) 87'	Report	O'Kane (yellow card) 69'; Howe (yellow card) 90'; Mansell (yellow card) 90+2'	Attendance: 4,171; Referee: James Adcock

28 Apr 2012	Torquay United	1–1	Crewe Alexandra	Plainmoor
15:00 BST	Stevens 49'; Ellis (yellow card) 73'; Howe (yellow card) 87'; O'Kane (yellow card) 90+7'	Report	Davis (yellow card) 17'; Dugdale (yellow card) 70'; Powell 90+4'; Leitch-Smith (yellow card) 90+7'	Attendance: 3,802; Referee: Dean Whitestone

5 May 2012	Hereford United	3–2	Torquay United	Edgar Street
15:00 BST	Facey 11'; Townsend (yellow card) 37'; Pell 36' (pen.); Purdie 40'; Anthony (yellow card) 85'	Report	Jarvis 46'; Atieno 63'; Mansell (yellow card) 85'	Attendance: 5,143; Referee: Roger East

=== League Two play-offs ===
13 May 2012 Semi-final 1st Leg	Cheltenham Town	2–0	Torquay United	Whaddon Road
12:00 BST	McGlashan 26'; Burgess 50'	Report		Attendance: 5,273; Referee: James Adcock

17 May 2012 Semi-final 2nd Leg	Torquay United	1–2	Cheltenham Town	Plainmoor
19:45 BST	Morris (yellow card) 45'; Ellis (yellow card) 70'; Atieno 85'	Report	McGlashan 76'; Pack 87' (yellow card) 89'	Attendance: 3,606; Referee: Andy D'Urso

=== FA Cup ===
12 Nov 2011 First Round	Chesterfield	1–3	Torquay United	B2net Stadium
15:00 GMT	Bowery 59'	Report	Stevens 20'; Morris (yellow card) 62'; Howe 72'; Nicholson 88'	Attendance: 4,332; Referee: Carl Berry

3 Dec 2011 Second Round	Sheffield United	3–2	Torquay United	Bramall Lane
15:00 GMT	Ellis 68' (o.g.); Evans 69' 78'; McDonald (yellow card) 90+1'	Report	Howe 3' (yellow card) 90'; Mansell (yellow card) 44'; Morris (yellow card) 61'; Robertson (yellow card) 81'; Stevens 90+3'	Attendance: 10,105; Referee: Chris Sarginson

=== League Cup ===
9 Aug 2011 First Round	Southampton	4–1	Torquay United	St Mary's Stadium
19:45 BST	De Ridder 16'; Lambert 27'; Chaplow 81'; Forte 90+3'	Report	Mansell 17'	Attendance: 6,541; Referee: David Phillips

=== League Trophy ===
30 Aug 2011 First Round	Cheltenham Town	2–1	Torquay United	Whaddon Road
19:45 BST	Spencer 14'; Goulding 42'; Pack (yellow card) 47'	Report	Lathrope (yellow card) 59'; Macklin 60'	Attendance: 1,247; Referee: David Coote

=== Friendlies ===
13 Jul 2011	Tiverton Town	1–2	Torquay United	Ladysmead
19:45 BST	Hill 51'	Report	Oastler 27'; Atieno 35' (pen.)	Attendance: 404

16 Jul 2011	Torquay United	2–0	Bristol City	Plainmoor
15:00 BST	Atieno 13'; Howe 53'	Report		Attendance: 1,596; Referee: Steve Bratt

20 Jul 2011	Torquay United	3–0	Exeter City	Plainmoor
19:45 BST	Howe 15'; Kee 29'; Morris 74'	Report		Attendance: 2,065

23 Jul 2011	Torquay United	1–3	Burnley	Plainmoor
15:00 BST	Howe 61'	Report	Bartley 8'; Rodriguez 33'; Rice 79' (o.g.)	Attendance: 1,759; Referee: Oli Langford

25 Jul 2011	Weston-super-Mare	1–3	Torquay United	Woodspring Stadium
19:45 BST	Ingram 61'	Report	Spear 3'; Halpin 25'; Latimer 72'

30 Jul 2011	Truro City	2–6	Torquay United	Treyew Road
15:00 BST	Taylor; Hayles	Report	Oastler; Atieno; Howe; Lathrope; McPhee; Kee (pen.)	Attendance: 506

23 Aug 2011	Torquay United	1–0	Yeovil Town	Plainmoor
	Halpin 43' (pen.); Lathrope (yellow card) 73'	Report		Attendance: 0

15 Feb 2012	Tiverton Town	1–1	Torquay United	Ladysmead
19:30 GMT	Clay	Report	Spear

27 Feb 2012	Torquay United	1–1	Exeter City	Plainmoor
13:30 GMT	Yeoman 74'	Report	Shephard 56'	Referee: Andy Tinkler

3 Apr 2012	Plymouth Argyle	0–1	Torquay United	Home Park
14:00 BST		Report	McPhee 70'	Referee: Lee Swabey

24 Apr 2012	Torquay United	3–2	Nike Academy	Plainmoor
12:30 BST	Easton 8'; Craig 32'; Yeoman 84'	Report	Tilson 72'; MacKenzie 88' (o.g.)

2 May 2012	Torquay United	1–1	Bideford	Plainmoor
19:00 BST	Halpin 54'	Report	Andrews 29'

=== Devon St Luke's Bowl ===
10 Jan 2012 Second Round	Willand Rovers	1–1 (6–7 p)	Torquay United	Silver Street
19:45 GMT	Stamp	Report	Latimer	Referee: Adam Hopkins
	Penalties
			Halpin (penalty scored); Yeoman (penalty scored); Palmer (penalty scored); Leadbitter (penalty scored); Thompson (penalty scored); Rice (penalty missed); Quinn (penalty missed); Kewell (penalty scored)

21 Feb 2012 Quarter Final	Buckland Athletic	3–0	Torquay United	Homers Heath
19:45 GMT	Hammon; Lynch; Stevens	Report	Rowe-Turner (red card)	Referee: Adam Hopkins

=== Reserves ===
Football Combination Southern Section
Pos	Team	Pld	W	D	L	GF	GA	GD	Pts
1	Forest Green Rovers	10	5	3	2	18	13	+5	18
2	Brighton & Hove Albion	9	5	2	2	16	14	+2	17
3	Cheltenham Town	10	5	2	3	23	19	+4	15 (Note: 2 points deducted?)
4	Bournemouth	10	4	2	4	16	15	+1	14
5	Crawley Town	10	4	1	5	27	25	+2	13
6	Torquay United	10	3	0	7	21	35	−14	9

Source: The Football Combination
Notes:

20 Sep 2011	Bournemouth	1–3	Torquay United	Dean Court
14:00 BST	Taylor 43'	Report	Macklin 47'; Yeoman 49'; Thompson 83'

27 Sep 2011	Crawley Town	8–2	Torquay United	Bewbush Training Ground
14:00 BST	Akpan 6'; Neilson 19'; Akinde 23' 25' 51' (pen.) 84'; Doughty; Landell 79'	Report	Yeoman 79'; Law

11 Oct 2011	Cheltenham Town	9–1	Torquay United	Season Business & Leisure Complex
14:00 BST	Lewis; Benbow; Smikle; Williams; Graham; Hooman	Report	Halpin	Referee: Richard Martin

18 Oct 2011	Torquay United	4–1	Crawley Town	Plainmoor
14:00 BST	Macklin 48'; Spear 59'; Yeoman 71'; Thompson 85' (pen.)	Report	Millard 62'

8 Nov 2011	Torquay United	2–3	Brighton & Hove Albion	Plainmoor
14:00 GMT	Yeoman 33'; Morris 47'	Report	Barker 58'; Forster-Caskey 73'; Simmonds 83'	Referee: Brett Huxtable

21 Nov 2011	Forest Green Rovers	1–0	Torquay United	The New Lawn
19:00 GMT	Henderson 4'	Report

29 Nov 2011	Torquay United	4–2	Cheltenham Town	Plainmoor
14:00 GMT	Macklin; Yeoman; Atieno	Report	Lewis; Andrew	Referee: Christopher Powell

14 Dec 2011	Brighton & Hove Albion	3–1	Torquay United	Culver Road
19:00 GMT	Sampayo; Simmonds; Hall	Report	Quinn

17 Jan 2012	Torquay United	2–3	Bournemouth	Plainmoor
14:00 GMT	Howe 72' 89' (pen.); Palmer (yellow card) 85'	Report	Moth 5' 90'; Bowles 80'	Referee: Chris Powell

31 Jan 2012	Torquay United	2–4	Forest Green	Plainmoor
14:00 GMT	Palmer 35'; McPhee 81'	Report	Wright 7'; Pook 20'; Smith 45'; Allen 78'	Referee: Dean Treleaven

== Club statistics ==
=== First team appearances ===
No.	Pos	Nat	Player	Total		League Two ^{[1]}		FA Cup		League Cup		League Trophy	
No.	Pos	Nat	Player	Apps	Goals	Apps	Goals	Apps	Goals	Apps	Goals	Apps	Goals
1	GK	(Austria) AUT	Bobby Olejnik	51	0	48+0	0	2+0	0	1+0	0	0+0	0
2	DF	(England) ENG	Lathaniel Rowe-Turner	25	0	0+22	0	0+1	0	0+1	0	1+0	0
3	DF	(England) ENG	Kevin Nicholson	51	5	48+0	4	2+0	1	1+0	0	0+0	0
4	DF	(England) ENG	Mark Ellis	40	3	36+1	3	2+0	0	0+0	0	1+0	0
5	DF	(Scotland) SCO	Chris Robertson	27	1	24+1	1	1+0	0	1+0	0	0+0	0
6	DF	(England) ENG	Brian Saah	40	1	37+0	1	1+0	0	1+0	0	1+0	0
7	MF	(England) ENG	Lee Mansell	51	13	47+0	12	2+0	0	1+0	1	1+0	0
8	FW	(Northern Ireland) NIR	Billy Kee	4	0	1+3	0	0+0	0	0+0	0	0+0	0
8	FW	(England) ENG	Ryan Jarvis	16	2	5+11	2	0+0	0	0+0	0	0+0	0
9	FW	(England) ENG	Rene Howe	44	14	37+3	12	2+0	2	1+0	0	1+0	0
10	MF	(Ireland) EIR	Eunan O'Kane	51	5	47+0	5	2+0	0	1+0	0	0+1	0
11	MF	(Ireland) EIR	Ian Morris	42	2	35+4	2	2+0	0	1+0	0	0+0	0
12	DF	(England) ENG	Daniel Leadbitter	2	0	0+2	0	0+0	0	0+0	0	0+0	0
13	GK	(England) ENG	Martin Rice	1	0	0+0	0	0+0	0	0+0	0	1+0	0
14	MF	(England) ENG	Lloyd Macklin	6	1	1+3	0	0+0	0	0+1	0	1+0	1
15	FW	(Wales) WAL	Billy Bodin	19	5	15+2	5	1+0	0	0+0	0	1+0	0
16	MF	(England) ENG	Chris McPhee	29	2	6+20	2	0+1	0	1+0	0	1+0	0
17	MF	(England) ENG	Saul Halpin	2	0	0+1	0	0+0	0	0+0	0	0+1	0
18	DF	(England) ENG	Joe Oastler	51	0	47+0	0	2+0	0	1+0	0	1+0	0
19	MF	(England) ENG	Danny Stevens	44	10	38+3	8	2+0	2	0+1	0	0+0	0
20	DF	(Scotland) SCO	Tom Aldred	0	0	0+0	0	0+0	0	0+0	0	0+0	0
20	MF	(Wales) WAL	Nathan Craig	0	0	0+0	0	0+0	0	0+0	0	0+0	0
21	DF	(England) ENG	Angus MacDonald	3	0	1+2	0	0+0	0	0+0	0	0+0	0
22	MF	(England) ENG	Damon Lathrope	44	0	37+5	0	1+0	0	0+0	0	1+0	0
23	FW	(Kenya) KEN	Taiwo Atieno	49	7	17+28	7	0+2	0	1+0	0	0+1	0
24	FW	(England) ENG	Ashley Yeoman	1	0	0+1	0	0+0	0	0+0	0	0+0	0
25	DF	(England) ENG	Ed Palmer	0	0	0+0	0	0+0	0	0+0	0	0+0	0
27	FW	(England) ENG	Ray Spear	0	0	0+0	0	0+0	0	0+0	0	0+0	0

Source: Torquay United

=== Top scorers ===
Place	Position	Nation	Number	Name	League Two ^{[1]}	FA Cup	League Cup	League Trophy	Total
1	FW	(England)	9	Rene Howe	12	2	0	0	14
2	MF	(England)	7	Lee Mansell	12	0	1	0	13
3	MF	(England)	19	Danny Stevens	8	2	0	0	10
4	FW	(Kenya)	23	Taiwo Atieno	7	0	0	0	7
5	FW	(Wales)	15	Billy Bodin	5	0	0	0	5
=	DF	(England)	3	Kevin Nicholson	4	1	0	0	5
=	MF	(Republic of Ireland)	10	Eunan O'Kane	5	0	0	0	5
8	DF	(England)	4	Mark Ellis	3	0	0	0	3
9	FW	(England)	8	Ryan Jarvis	2	0	0	0	2
=	MF	(England)	16	Chris McPhee	2	0	0	0	2
=	MF	(Republic of Ireland)	11	Ian Morris	2	0	0	0	2
12	MF	(England)	14	Lloyd Macklin	0	0	0	1	1
=	DF	(Scotland)	5	Chris Robertson	1	0	0	0	1
=	DF	(England)	6	Brian Saah	1	0	0	0	1
				TOTALS	64	5	1	1	71

Source: Torquay United

=== Disciplinary record ===
Number	Nation	Position	Name	League Two ^{[1]}		FA Cup		League Cup		League Trophy		Total	
Number	Nation	Position	Name	Yellow card	Red card	Yellow card	Red card	Yellow card	Red card	Yellow card	Red card	Yellow card	Red card
9	(England)	FW	Rene Howe	9	2	1	0	0	0	0	0	10	2
22	(England)	MF	Damon Lathrope	9	0	0	0	0	0	1	0	10	0
7	(England)	MF	Lee Mansell	9	0	1	0	0	0	0	0	10	0
10	(Republic of Ireland)	MF	Eunan O'Kane	10	0	0	0	0	0	0	0	10	0
11	(Republic of Ireland)	MF	Ian Morris	5	1	2	0	0	0	0	0	7	1
18	(England)	MF	Joe Oastler	6	1	0	0	0	0	0	0	6	1
4	(England)	DF	Mark Ellis	6	0	0	0	0	0	0	0	6	0
5	(Scotland)	DF	Chris Robertson	2	0	1	0	0	0	0	0	3	0
6	(England)	DF	Brian Saah	2	0	0	0	0	0	0	0	2	0
23	(Kenya)	FW	Taiwo Atieno	1	0	0	0	0	0	0	0	1	0
15	(Wales)	FW	Billy Bodin	1	0	0	0	0	0	0	0	1	0
21	(England)	DF	Angus MacDonald	1	0	0	0	0	0	0	0	1	0
14	(England)	MF	Lloyd Macklin	1	0	0	0	0	0	0	0	1	0
1	(Austria)	GK	Bobby Olejnik	1	0	0	0	0	0	0	0	1	0
2	(England)	DF	Lathaniel Rowe-Turner	1	0	0	0	0	0	0	0	1	0
19	(England)	MF	Danny Stevens	1	0	0	0	0	0	0	0	1	0
			TOTALS	65	4	5	0	0	0	1	0	71	4

Source: Torquay United

^{1} . League Two statistics include the League Two play-offs.

=== Transfers ===
==== In ====
Date	Nat.	Pos.	Name	From	Fee	References
1 July 2011	(Austria)	GK	Bobby Olejnik	Falkirk	Undisclosed	
1 July 2011	(England)	DF	Brian Saah	Cambridge United	Undisclosed	
13 July 2011	(England)	FW	Rene Howe	Peterborough United	Undisclosed	
15 July 2011	(England)	GK	Martin Rice	Truro City	Free	
18 July 2011	(Republic of Ireland)	MF	Ian Morris	Unattached	Free	
23 July 2011	(Kenya)	FW	Taiwo Atieno	Unattached	Free	
1 February 2012	(Wales)	MF	Nathan Craig	Unattached	Free	
26 May 2012	(England)	FW	Ryan Jarvis	Unattached	Free	
26 June 2012	(Scotland)	MF	Craig Easton	Unattached	Free	
28 June 2012	(England)	DF	Tom Cruise	Unattached	Free	
28 June 2012	(England)	GK	Michael Poke	Unattached	Free	

==== Loans in ====
Date	Nat.	Pos.	Name	From	Expiry date	References
25 August 2011	(Wales)	FW	Billy Bodin	Swindon Town	2 January 2012	
24 November 2011	(Scotland)	DF	Tom Aldred	Colchester United	2 January 2012	
8 February 2012	(England)	DF	Angus MacDonald	Reading	End of season	
1 March 2012	(England)	FW	Ryan Jarvis	Walsall	End of season	

==== Out ====
Date	Nat.	Pos.	Name	To	Fee	References
4 July 2011	(England)	FW	Chris Zebroski	Bristol Rovers	Undisclosed	
26 August 2011	(Northern Ireland)	FW	Billy Kee	Burton Albion	Undisclosed	
31 January 2012	(Scotland)	DF	Chris Robertson	Preston North End	Undisclosed	
1 March 2012	(England)	FW	Ray Spear	Released	n/a	
21 May 2012	(England)	DF	Ed Palmer	Released	n/a	
21 May 2012	(England)	DF	Lathaniel Rowe-Turner	Released	n/a	
23 May 2012	(Kenya)	FW	Taiwo Atieno	Released	n/a	
18 June 2012	(Austria)	GK	Bobby Olejnik	Peterborough United	Undisclosed	
27 June 2012	(England)	DF	Mark Ellis	Crewe Alexandra	Undisclosed	

==== Loans out ====
Date	Nat.	Pos.	Name	To	Expiry date	References
23 July 2011	(England)	DF	Ed Palmer	Truro City	10 January 2012	
31 October 2011	(England)	FW	Ray Spear	Bideford	10 January 2012	
1 December 2011	(England)	MF	Lloyd Macklin	Salisbury City	10 January 2012	
