= 2011 Football League Two play-off final =

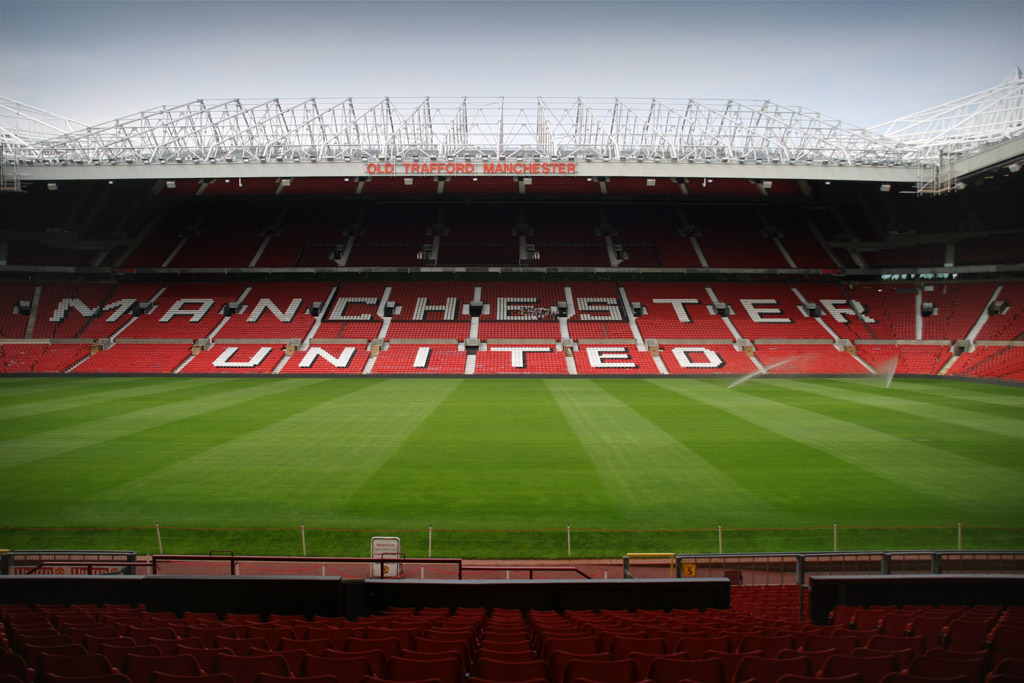
- Old Trafford hosted the match due to the double-booking of the usual venue Wembley Stadium
- Event: 2010–11 Football League Two
Stevenage	Torquay United
1	0
- Date: 28 May 2011
- Venue: Old Trafford, Manchester
- Referee: Darren Deadman
- Attendance: 11,484

The 2011 Football League Two play-off final was an association football match which was played on 28 May 2011 at Old Trafford in Manchester, between Stevenage and Torquay United, to determine the fourth and final team to gain promotion from Football League Two to the League One. The top three teams of the 2010–11 Football League Two season, Chesterfield, Bury and Wycombe Wanderers, gained automatic promotion to League One, while those placed from fourth to seventh position took part in play-offs. The winners of the play-off semi-finals competed for the final place for the 2011–12 season in League One. Shrewsbury Town and Accrington Stanley were the defeated semi-finalists, losing to Torquay United and Stevenage respectively.

Darren Deadman was the referee for the final which was played in front of 11,484 spectators. Stevenage started the game strongly and in the 41st minute took the lead when Darius Charles passed to John Mousinho whose strike from 20 yards (18 m) flew into the bottom corner of the Torquay United goal. Jake Robinson's second-half shot hit the Stevenage crossbar and with no further goals the match ended 1–0 to Stevenage who secured back-to-back promotions.

Stevenage ended their following season in sixth place in League One and qualified for the 2012 play-offs where they lost 1–0 on aggregate to Sheffield United on aggregate in the semi-final. The next season, Accrington Stanley finished in fourteenth position in League Two.

== Route to the final ==
Football League Two final table, leading positions
Pos	Team	Pld	W	D	L	GF	GA	GD	Pts
1	Chesterfield	46	24	14	8	85	51	+34	86
2	Bury	46	23	12	11	82	50	+32	81
3	Wycombe Wanderers	46	22	14	10	69	50	+19	80
4	Shrewsbury Town	46	22	13	11	72	49	+23	79
5	Accrington Stanley	46	18	19	9	73	55	+18	73
6	Stevenage	46	18	15	13	62	45	+17	69
7	Torquay United	46	17	18	11	74	53	+21	68 (Note: Torquay United were deducted one point for fielding an unregistered player.)

Notes:

Stevenage finished the regular 2010–11 season in sixth place in Football League Two, the fourth tier of the English football league system, one place and one point ahead of Torquay United (who had been deducted a single point for fielding an unregistered player). Both therefore missed out on the three automatic places for promotion to Football League One and instead took part in the play-offs to determine the fourth promoted team. Stevenage finished eleven points behind Wycombe Wanderers (who were promoted in third place), twelve behind Bury (promoted in second) and seventeen behind league winners Chesterfield.

Torquay United's opponents for their play-off semi-final were Shrewsbury Town with the first match of the two-legged tie taking place at Plainmoor in Torquay on 14 May 2011. Torquay dominated the first half and took the lead in the 29th minute when Chris Zebroski scored following a pass from Gavin Tomlin. The home side doubled their advantage in first-half stoppage time after Eunan O'Kane's 20-yard (18 m) strike beat the Shrewsbury Town goalkeeper Ben Smith. After a goalless second half, the match ended 2–0 to Torquay United. The second leg was held six days later at New Meadow in Shrewsbury. Torquay United's goalkeeper Scott Bevan was forced to make a number of saves while his side also went close to scoring, but the deadlock failed to be broken. The match ended 0–0 and Torquay United progressed to the final with a 2–0 aggregate victory.

In the other semi-final, Stevenage faced Accrington Stanley and the first leg was played at Broadhall Way in Stevenage on 15 May 2011. Stacy Long opened the scoring for the home side with a 15-yard (14 m) strike which took a deflection off Sean Hessey before finding the Accrington Stanley net. Darius Charles's 30 yards (27 m) volley then hit the Accrington Stanley goalpost and rebounded to Joel Byrom who scored just before half time. The visiting side went closest to scoring in the second half when Jimmy Ryan struck the ball against his teammate Sean McConville when the Stevenage goal was undefended, and the match ended 2–0. The return leg took place five days later at the Crown Ground in Accrington. After a goalless first half, two Accrington Stanley players were sent off: Joe Jacobson was dismissed for a late tackle on Lawrie Wilson before Sean McConville was shown the red card for lashing out after the initial sending-off. Chris Beardsley scored in the last minute of the match to secure a 1–0 win for Stevenage and progression to the final with a 3–0 aggregate victory.

== Match ==
=== Background ===
Due to the 2011 UEFA Champions League Final being held at Wembley Stadium on 28 May 2011, it appeared that the three Football League play-off finals may have to be played at a different venue for the first time since 2007. Manchester United's Old Trafford had been confirmed as a possible alternative, while Arsenal's Emirates Stadium and the Millennium Stadium in Cardiff were also under consideration to host the Championship, League One and League Two play-off finals. It was confirmed in January 2011 that Wembley would host the Championship play-off final on 30 May, while Old Trafford would host the League Two and League One finals on 28 and 29 May respectively.

Stevenage were bidding for back-to-back promotions, as the season prior they had won the Conference Premier title with 99 points making the 2010–11 season their first season in the Football League. Manager Graham Westley was in his second spell as Stevenage manager. Stevenage secured a play-off place after a run of nine victories out of eleven, propelling the club up the league table and into the play-off positions. This included winning six games in a row, a sequence only matched by Bury during the regular season. A 3–3 draw on the last day of the season against Bury confirmed Stevenage's place in the play-offs, finishing sixth with 69 points.

Torquay were aiming to return to League One, where they last played in the 2004–05 season. Having been relegated from the Football League in 2007, they returned two seasons later via the play-offs. Torquay went into the match having lost one of their last fourteen in all competitions, with seven clean sheets out of the last nine. Manager Paul Buckle was appointed in June 2007; his team lost the 2008 FA Trophy Final, but returned to Wembley one year later for play-off success against Cambridge United.

In the meetings between the sides during the regular season, the match at Broadhall Way in September 2010 ended in a goalless draw while the game at Plainmoor the following March saw a 2–0 victory for Torquay United. Zebroski and Elliot Benyon were Torquay United's leading scorers during the regular season, both having scored a total of 14 goals in all competitions. Stevenage's top scorer going into the play-offs was Byron Harrison with 8 goals (all in the league).

=== Summary ===
The scheduled 3 p.m. kick off was delayed following a road traffic accident on the M6 motorway which held up the arrival of travelling supporters. The match finally got under way at 3:16 p.m. on 28 May 2011 and was refereed by Darren Deadman. Stevenage started the final the stronger side and after six minutes had the first opportunity to score. Darius Charles passed the ball in-field to Craig Reid but his shot from 12 yards (11 m) was blocked by Torquay United's Guy Branston. Three minutes later, both Billy Kee and then Lee Mansell shot at the Stevenage goal but the ball was eventually cleared by Mark Roberts. Charles' pass then found John Mousinho on the edge of the Torquay United penalty area but his low shot was held by Bevan. Torquay United began to assert some pressure on Stevenage with a series of crosses, but failed to convert any of their opportunities to score. On the half-hour mark, Lawrie Wilson made a break and after Bevan failed to clear his cross, Charles struck the ball over the Torquay United crossbar. Two minutes later, Reid's low shot was gathered by Bevan which was followed by a Stevenage free kick which was caught by the Torquay United goalkeeper. Tomlin was clear in the Stevenage box in the 37th minute but was tackled by Roberts, then Charles headed Long's cross into the ground and over the Torquay United bar. In the 41st minute, Stevenage took the lead when Charles passed to Mousinho whose strike from 20 yards (18 m) flew into the bottom corner of the Torquay United goal. Branston then headed a corner just wide for Torquay United and after one minute of stoppage time, the half was brought to a close.

Neither side made any changes to their personnel during the interval and the second half started with Torquay United applying pressure. Five minutes in, Kee was sent clear with a pass from Kevin Nicholson and went one-one-one with the Stevenage goalkeeper Chris Day but his weak shot was deflected round the goalpost. In the 55th minute, Zebroski was shown the first yellow card of the match for foul on Roberts. Three minutes later, Stevenage made the first substitution of the match, with Darren Murphy replacing Byrom. Soon after, Mousinho was booked for time-wasting before Harrison was brought on by Stevenage as a substitute for Reid who had injured his hamstring. Charles then saw his low shot saved by Bevan before Zebroski's shot following an error from Roberts hit the side netting. Jake Robinson's 18-yard (16 m) strike was saved by Day and then Zebroski shot over the Stevenage bar. Murphy's close-range header went wide of the Torquay United goal before Robinson's shot hit the Stevenage crossbar. In the 79th minute, Joe Oastler came on to replace Damon Lathrope and was booked a minute later for a foul on Harrison. Three minutes later, Branston's initial shot from a Stevenage corner was blocked and he struck the rebound over the bar from around 12 yards (11 m). With seven minutes of regular time remaining, Torquay United made a double-substitution, with Danny Stevens and Lathaniel Rowe-Turner coming on for Robinson and Nicholson. Stevenage then brought Beardsley on to replace Charles. Stevens late shot for Torquay United was blocked and the match ended 1–0 to Stevenage who secured back-to-back promotions.

=== Details ===
28 May 2011
15:15 BST

Stevenage	1–0	Torquay United
Mousinho 41'	Report

Old Trafford, Manchester
Attendance: 11,484
Referee: Darren Deadman (Cambridgeshire)

Stevenage	Torquay United

GK	16	Chris Day
DF	3	Scott Laird
DF	14	Mark Roberts (c)
DF	24	Michael Bostwick
DF	25	Ronnie Henry
DF	4	Darius Charles		(substituted off) 85'
MF	2	Lawrie Wilson
MF	8	Stacy Long
MF	13	Joel Byrom		(substituted off) 57'
MF	21	John Mousinho	(yellow card) 59'
FW	10	Craig Reid		(substituted off) 62'
Substitutes:
GK	29	Joe Welch
DF	5	Jon Ashton
MF	7	Darren Murphy		(substituted on) 57'
MF	17	Peter Winn
FW	12	Ben May
FW	20	Chris Beardsley		(substituted on) 85'
FW	26	Byron Harrison	(yellow card) 90+4'	(substituted on) 62'
Manager:
Graham Westley

GK	1	Scott Bevan
DF	3	Kevin Nicholson		(substituted off) 83'
DF	5	Chris Robertson
DF	7	Lee Mansell (c)
DF	23	Guy Branston
MF	8	Billy Kee
MF	9	Jake Robinson		(substituted off) 83'
MF	10	Eunan O'Kane
MF	22	Damon Lathrope		(substituted off) 79'
FW	15	Gavin Tomlin
FW	26	Chris Zebroski	(yellow card) 55'
Substitutes:
GK	16	Danny Potter
DF	2	Lathaniel Rowe-Turner		(substituted on) 83'
DF	18	Joe Oastler	(yellow card) 80'	(substituted on) 79'
DF	4	Mark Ellis
MF	17	Saul Halpin
MF	19	Danny Stevens		(substituted on) 83'
MF	14	Lloyd Macklin
Manager:
Paul Buckle

Statistics
	Stevenage	Torquay United
Goals scored	1	0
Total shots	8	16
Shots on target	4	3
Ball possession	54%	46%
Corner kicks	3	7
Fouls committed	14	10
Offsides	1	2
Yellow cards	2	2
Red cards	0	0

== Post-match ==
The winning goalscorer Mousinho said: "It's incredible to be here at Old Trafford and to win through as well. From where we've come, to win back-to-back promotions is incredible. It was a long, long second half ... but we came through it." His manager Westley attributed his side's success to the effort they had put in during the season: "It's been a long, hard season ... The secret to success in any form of life is hard work and we've done that, put in the work." Two days after the final, Buckle left Torquay United to take up the vacant managerial role at Bristol Rovers. Two weeks later, Torquay United appointed Martin Ling as Buckle's replacement.

Stevenage ended their following season in sixth place in League One and qualified for the 2012 League One play-offs where they lost 1–0 on aggregate to Sheffield United in the semi-final. The next season, Torquay United finished in fifth position in League Two and qualified for the 2012 League Two play-offs where they lost 4–1 on aggregate to Cheltenham Town in the semi-final.
