= 2008 FA Trophy final =

2008 FA Trophy Final
- Event: 2007–08 FA Trophy
Ebbsfleet United	Torquay United
1	0
- Date: 10 May 2008
- Venue: Wembley Stadium, London
- Man of the Match: Chris McPhee
- Referee: Martin Atkinson (West Yorkshire)
- Attendance: 40,186

The 2008 FA Trophy Final was the 39th final of the Football Association's cup competition for levels 5–8 of the English football league system. It was contested by Ebbsfleet United and Torquay United on 10 May 2008 at Wembley Stadium in London.

Ebbsfleet United won the match 1–0 to win the competition for the first time in their history.

Martin Atkinson was the referee.

== Match ==
=== Details ===
10 May 2008
14:30 BST

Ebbsfleet United	1–0	Torquay United
McPhee 45'	Report

Wembley Stadium, London
Attendance: 40,186
Referee: Martin Atkinson (West Yorkshire)

Ebbsfleet United	Torquay United

GK	1	(England) Lance Cronin
RB	2	(England) Peter Hawkins
CB	3	(France) Sacha Opinel
CB	5	(England) James Smith (yellow card)
LB	6	(Republic of Ireland) Paul McCarthy (c) (yellow card)
RM	8	(England) Stacy Long	(substituted off) 84'
CM	12	(England) Chris McPhee
CM	14	(England) Neil Barrett
LM	25	(England) Michael Bostwick
FW	19	(England) John Akinde
FW	14	(England) Luke Moore (yellow card)
Substitutes:
GK	21	(England) Sam Mott
DF	4	(England) Gary MacDonald	(substituted on) 84'
DF	4	(England) Mark Ricketts
MF	17	(England) George Purcell
FW	10	(England) Chukki Eribenne
Manager:
(England) Liam Daish

GK	21	(England) Martin Rice (yellow card)
RB	3	(England) Kevin Nicholson (c)
CB	4	(England) Steve Woods
CB	6	(Wales) Chris Todd
LB	7	(England) Lee Mansell
RM	8	(England) Tim Sills	(substituted off) 88'
CM	10	(England) Lee Phillips	(substituted off) 46'
CM	14	(England) Chris Hargreaves
LM	20	(England) Roscoe D'Sane	(substituted off) 66'
FW	24	(England) Steve Adams
FW	26	(England) Chris Zebroski
Substitutes:
DF	5	(Scotland) Chris Robertson
MF	11	(England) Kevin Hill	(substituted on) 88'
MF	16	(England) Matthew Hockley
MF	19	(England) Danny Stevens	(substituted on) 46'
FW	9	(England) Elliot Benyon	(substituted on) 66'
Manager:
(England) Paul Buckle
