= Damon Lathrope =

English footballer

- Lathrope in 2026

Personal information
- Full name: Damon Len Lathrope
- Date of birth: 28 October 1989 (age 37)
- Place of birth: Stevenage, England
- Position: Midfielder

Team information
- Current team: Plymouth Argyle (assistant head coach)

Youth career
- Cambridge United
- 2006–2008: Norwich City

Senior career*
Years	Team	Apps	(Gls)
2008–2010	Norwich City	0	(0)
2009–2010	→ Bishop's Stortford (loan)	9	(0)
2010–2014	Torquay United	109	(0)
2013	→ Hereford United (loan)	8	(0)
2014–2016	Aldershot Town	45	(2)
2016–2018	Torquay United	43	(0)
2018	Woking	4	(0)
Total		218	(2)

Managerial career
- 2022–2024: Watford Women
- 2024–2025: Watford (assistant)
- 2025–: Plymouth Argyle (assistant)
- * Club domestic league appearances and goals

Damon Len Lathrope (born 28 October 1989) is an English professional football manager and former player who played as a midfielder. He is assistant head coach of EFL League One club Plymouth Argyle.

After coming through Norwich City's academy, Lathorpe signed for Torquay United, Aldershot Town and Woking.

== Club career ==
Born in Stevenage, Lathrope began his youth career at Cambridge United, though moved on to Norwich City's academy in 2006–07. He initially played in the left–back position while at the club's reserve before playing in the midfield position. Before making his professional debut, he scored twice for the first team in friendly matches, the first in a benefit match for former Norwich player Shaun Carey, versus Carey's King's Lynn teammates in October 2006. When Norwich then revisited King's Lynn for a pre-season friendly in July 2007, Lathrope repeated the trick with another goal.

Lathrope signed a professional contract with the Canaries in January 2008 and was given a squad number of 36. He was included in the club's first team for the first time, appearing as an unused substitute, as Norwich City lost 1–0 against Milton Keynes Dons in the first round of the League Cup. In November 2009 he joined Conference South club Bishop's Stortford on a two-month loan. In May 2010 he was released by the Canaries, and signed with Torquay United in July 2010.

=== Torquay United ===
He made his debut for the club on 11 August 2010, coming on as a 112th minute substitute for Danny Stevens in their League Cup First Round defeat to Reading at Plainmoor. Having failed to establish himself in the 2010–11 season, Lathrope claimed his place in the side under the new regime of Martin Ling, following a formation change to 4–5–1 which saw Lathrope employed in a holding role in front of the back four. He helped the side reach the Football League Two play-off final, but lost 1–0 against Stevenage. In his first season at Torquay United, Lathrope went on to make twenty–three appearances in all competitions.

In the 2011–12 season, Lathrope continued to regain his first team place under the management of Martin Ling and impressed the side in a number of matches for the side. He helped the side go on " a wholly satisfying first half of the season" by placing the side in the League Two play-offs. Lathrope then set up a goal for Lee Mansell to score the only goal in the game, in a 1–0 win over Dagenham & Redbridge on 24 January 2012. He was subjected of praise by Manager Martin Ling over the months, saying: "You've got Lee Mansell and Damon Lathrope who do a lot of unsung work, even our front three have to work hard, the two wide boys, it's in their remit that if their full-back goes forward they have to go with them and work hard" and "having Lathrope playing that key role in the middle really helps me and O'Kane get forward and the chances just fell to me." Lathrope helped the club qualify for the League play-offs, but lost both legs against Cheltenham Town. Despite facing suspension and injury during the 2011–12 season, he finished the 2011–12 season, making forty–four appearances in all competitions. Following this, Lathrope was offered a new contract by the club and a few days later, he signed a new contract extension, keeping him until 2014.

At the start of the 2012–13 season, Lathrope started the club's first two matches of the season before suffering an injury, in a 2–2 against Cheltenham Town on 22 August 2012. As a result, he missed nine matches throughout September and the beginning of October. Lathrope made his return to the first team from injury, starting the whole game, in a 3–1 win over Accrington Stanley on 13 October 2012. Over the months throughout the 2012–13 season, he regained his first team place for the side and went on to make thirty appearances in all competitions.

In the 2013–14 season, Lathrope found his first team opportunities limited under the management of Alan Knill. Following his loan spell at Hereford United came to an end, he returned to the first team and made his first appearance return on 4 January 2014, in a 1–1 draw against Morecambe. Following this, Lathrope regained his first team place for the remaining matches of the season under the management of Chris Hargreaves. However, the club was relegated from League Two at the end of the 2013–14 season and went on to make twenty–three appearances in all competitions. Following this, Lathrope was offered a new contract by the club.

Lathrope joined Hereford United on a one-month loan on 12 November 2013 making his debut the same day in a 2–2 draw with Chester. He went on to make eight appearances before returning to his parent club in January.

=== Aldershot Town ===
After turning down a new contract with Torquay United, Lathrope signed for Conference Premier team Aldershot Town on 1 July 2014. Upon joining the club, he was given a number four shirt.

Lathrope made his Aldershot Town debut, starting the whole game, in a 3–1 win over Altrincham in the opening game of the season. Since joining the club, he quickly became a first team regular for the side, playing in the midfield position. His first goal for the club came on 16 September 2014, in a 3–1 loss against Braintree Town. However, Lathrope was sidelined with a groin injury that kept him out for four months. After returning to full training, he made his return from injury, coming on as a substitute in the 75th minute, in a 3–1 win over Dover Athletic on 3 March 2015. After this, he regained his first team place for the remaining matches of the season. At the end of the 2014–15 season, Lathrope went on to make twenty–four appearances and scoring once in all competitions. Following this, he signed a one–year contract extension with the club.

At the start of the 2015–16 season, Lathrope started the first three league matches before missing out three matches, due to a groin injury. Over the season, he found himself in and out of the starting line-up, due to strong competitions in the midfield position. Lathrope scored his second goal for the club, in a 2–0 win over Macclesfield Town on 23 January 2016. However the following month, he suffered an injury during a 3–2 loss against Gateshead on 27 February 2016 and subsequently sidelined for the rest of the season. At the end of the 2015–16 season, Lathrope went on to make twenty–three appearances and scoring once in all competitions. Following this, the club began discussions with him over a new contract.

=== Torquay return ===
On 3 June 2016, Lathrope agreed to a deal to return to Torquay United, subject to a medical, for the 2016/17 National League campaign.

He made his second Torquay United debut on 6 August 2016, started the match before being substituted in the 57th minute, in a 2–0 loss against Macclesfield Town in the opening game of the season. Lathrope was featured for the first five league matches before being sidelined with an injury. However, he was sidelined once again after suffering a groin injury that ruled him out "for much of the rest of the season". By January, Lathrope returned to full training and made his return from injury, coming on as a substitute in the 69th minute, in a 3–1 win over Gateshead on 28 January 2017. Following this, he continued to be a first team regular for the rest of the season and helped the side avoid relegation in the National League At the end of the 2016–17 season, he went on to make twenty–four appearances.

In the 2017–18 season, Lathrope was featured five out of the first six league matches of the season before being sidelined with a groin injury. It wasn't until on 30 September 2017 when he returned from injury, starting the whole game, in a 1–0 loss against Dagenham & Redbridge. Lathrope continued to remain involve in the club's first team throughout the first half of the season. By the time he departed Torquay United, Lathorpe made nineteen appearances for the side this season.

=== Woking ===
On 26 January 2018, Lathrope joined another National League side, Woking, on a one-and-a-half-year deal for an undisclosed fee. He made his debut in a 1–0 win over AFC Fylde the following day, coming on as a substitute in the 65th minute. However, on 24 February 2018 Lathrope suffered a serious leg injury during a match against Boreham Wood, resulting in a 30-minute delay to the game. The injury forced him to retire from playing on 3 March.

== Post–playing career ==
Following his retirement in 2018, Woking set up a fundraising campaign to help Lathrope and over £5000 was raised. Shortly after the end of his playing career, Lathrope was appointed as Hitchin Town's U19 coach.

Towards the end of 2021–22 FA Women's Championship, Lathrope combined a coaching role in Watford's academy with working as assistant coach of Watford Women. In June he was appointed head coach of the team. He holds a UEFA A License.

== Personal life ==
Lathrope is married to Jade and they have two children together. His uncle, Paul Buckle, is a professional footballer turned coach.

Growing up, Lathrope supported Tottenham Hotspur and idolised David Beckham.

== Career statistics ==
As of match played 24 February 2018

Appearances and goals by club, season and competition
Club	Season	League			FA Cup		League Cup		Other		Total	
Club	Season	Division	Apps	Goals	Apps	Goals	Apps	Goals	Apps	Goals	Apps	Goals
Bishops Stortford (loan)	2009–10	Conference South	9	0	0	0	—		1 (Note: Appearances in the FA Trophy)	0	10	0
Torquay United	2010–11	League Two	18	0	1	0	1	0	4 (Note: One appearance in the Football League Trophy and three in the League Two play-offs)	0	24	0
Torquay United	2011–12	League Two	40	0	1	0	0	0	3 (Note: One appearance in the Football League Trophy and two in the League Two play-offs)	0	44	0
Torquay United	2012–13	League Two	28	0	1	0	1	0	0	0	30	0
Torquay United	2013–14	League Two	23	0	0	0	0	0	1 (Note: Appearance in the Football League Trophy)	0	24	0
Torquay United	Torquay total I		109	0	3	0	2	0	8	0	122	0
Hereford United (loan)	2013–14	Conference Premier	8	0	0	0	—		1	0	9	0
Aldershot Town	2014–15	Conference Premier	24	1	0	0	—		0	0	24	1
Aldershot Town	2015–16	National League	21	1	3	0	—		1	0	25	1
Aldershot Town	Aldershot total		45	2	3	0	0	0	1	0	49	2
Torquay United	2016–17	National League	24	0	2	0	—		0	0	26	0
Torquay United	2017–18	National League	19	0	1	0	—		0	0	20	0
Torquay United	Torquay total II		43	0	3	0	0	0	0	0	46	0
Woking	2017–18	National League	4	0	0	0	—		0	0	4	0
Career total			218	2	9	0	2	0	11	0	240	2
