= Martin Rice =

English footballer (born 1986)

Personal information
- Full name: Martin John Rice
- Date of birth: 7 March 1986 (age 40)
- Place of birth: Exeter, England
- Position: Goalkeeper

Team information
- Current team: Exmouth Town

Senior career*
Years	Team	Apps	(Gls)
2003–2007	Exeter City	55	(0)
2007–2009	Torquay United	9	(0)
2008–2009	→ Truro City (loan)	20	(1)
2009–2011	Truro City	42	(0)
2011–2015	Torquay United	72	(0)
2015–2016	Truro City	39	(0)
2016	Gosport Borough	17	(0)
2016–2017	Truro City	14	(0)
2017–2018	Tiverton Town		
2018–	Exmouth Town		
- * Club domestic league appearances and goals as of 09:21, 15 March 2019 (UTC)

Martin John Rice (born 7 March 1986) is an English professional footballer who plays as a goalkeeper for Exmouth Town. He spent most of his early professional career at Exeter City and has since played for their rivals Torquay United and non-League side Truro City.

Rice rejoined Torquay in 2011 but failed to feature in a league match in 2011–12; he finally made his first league appearance since rejoining the club in November 2012.

== Career ==
=== Exeter City ===
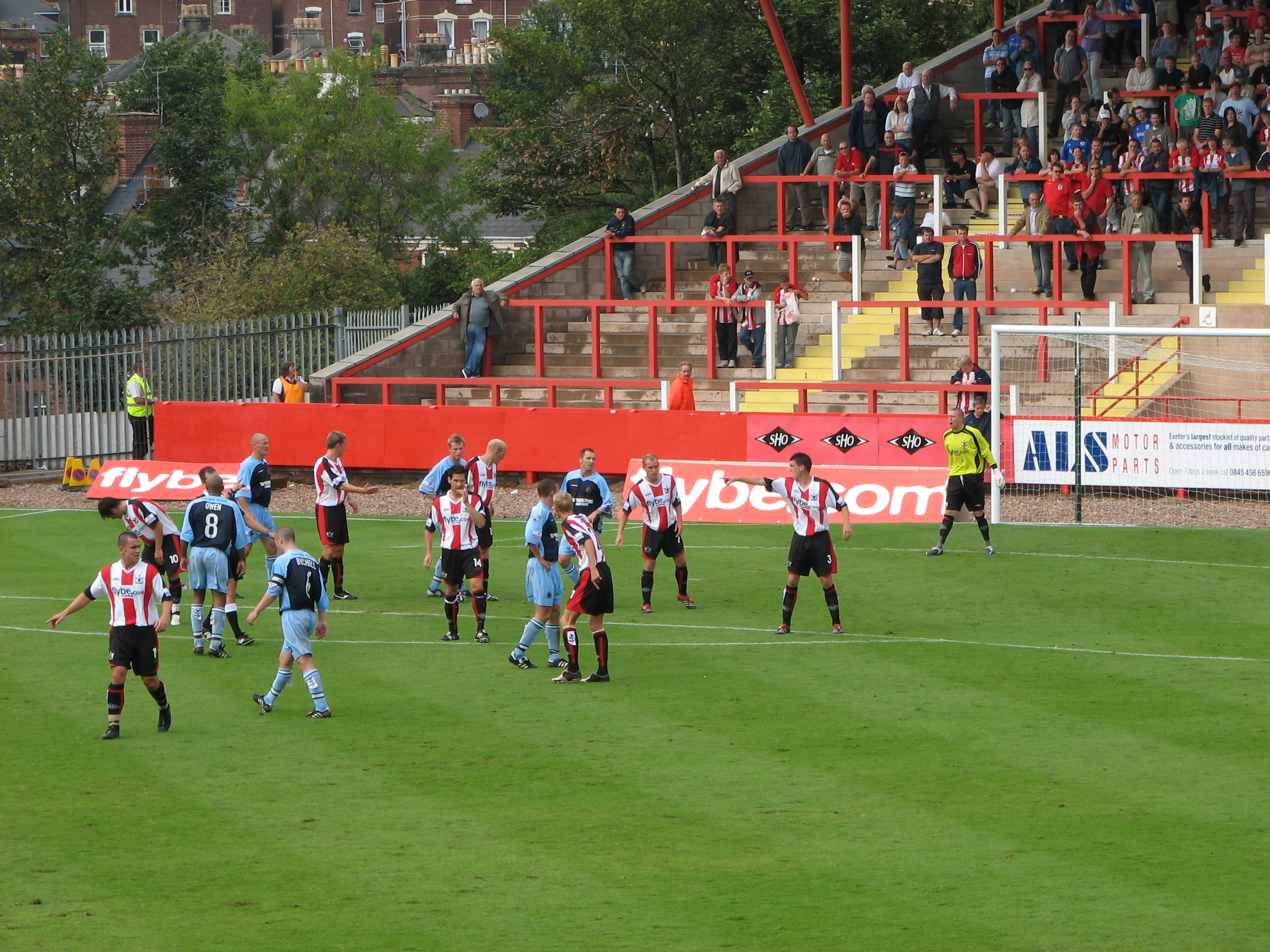
Rice (in yellow) playing for Exeter against Altrincham in 2006.

Born in Exeter, Rice came through the youth scheme at Exeter City, his hometown club, being promoted from the youth team to the senior side in July 2003. Rice began his professional career with the Grecians, making his debut aged 17, and spent four seasons at the club. He made his debut in a 3–2 win against Barnet on 7 October 2003. In his first season, 2003–04, he made five league appearances and two FA Cup appearances. He improved on this record in 2004–05, making 18 appearances in all competitions. Rice was sent off in Exeter's 3–2 win over Dagenham & Redbridge on 7 December 2004, after fouling Dagenham forward Craig Mackail-Smith.

However, in 2005–06, Rice only made five appearances, and despite making 27 league appearances the next season, he moved to Torquay United in 2007–08 after reaching the end of his contract with Exeter. Rice played a significant role in the Grecians' run to the Conference play-offs, and played in both of Exeter's semi-final ties with Oxford United. Exeter lost 1–0 in the home leg on 4 May 2007, but managed to win 2–1 in the away leg to send the match to a penalty-shoot out. Rice saved Barry Quinn's penalty as Exeter won 4–3 in the shoot-out.

Rice returned to St James Park in May 2011 to play for an Exeter XI in Adam Stansfield's testimonial. Since leaving Exeter he has also worked for the club's Football in the Community Trust, running goalkeeper coaching courses in February 2010.

=== Torquay United ===
Rice's first spell with Torquay United resulted in nine league appearances, in a side that had just been relegated to the Conference National for the first time. Rice failed to establish himself as a regular in the side and was mostly used as backup to the more experienced Canadian goalkeeper Simon Rayner. Rice made more appearances in various cup competitions, amassing 11 cup appearances (including three FA Cup games) in total and 20 appearances for the season in all competitions. One of these cup appearances was in the FA Trophy 2007–08 Final against Ebbsfleet United, where Torquay lost 1–0. Rice gave away a penalty after bringing down future teammate Chris McPhee, but made amends by saving the resulting spot-kick to keep the scores level. In a 2012 interview, Rice hailed the penalty stop as "the best save I ever made – especially as I'd given the pen away!".

He had also played in Torquay's FA Trophy semi-final first-leg win over York City, keeping a clean sheet in a 2–0 win, and the second-leg defeat to York on 15 March 2008.

Rice was loaned to Truro City for the majority of the 2008–09 season, returning towards the end of the season to be part of Torquay's play-off squad. He was an unused substitute in Torquay's 2–0 2009 Conference National play-off final victory over Cambridge United on 17 May 2009.

Rice agreed a new one-year deal with Torquay to stay at Plainmoor as they made their return to the Football League. However, he lasted just three months into the contract.

After impressing coaches at Truro during his loan spell, Rice left for Cornwall on a free transfer on 29 September 2009 after being released by Torquay.

=== Truro City ===
In his loan spell with City in 2008–09, Rice made 20 league appearances, even scoring a goal in the process. With Truro 3–0 up against Abingdon United in injury time in February 2009, they were awarded a penalty. Rice was given the honours and duly converted, for the only goal of his career so far. Rice kept five clean sheets in his loan spell. He was unable to play in FA Cup or FA Trophy games for Truro whilst on loan, and Torquay had a 24-hour recall on the goalkeeper.

After impressing on loan from Torquay, Rice signed a permanent deal with Truro a few games into the 2009–10 season; Truro registered the goalkeeper on 1 September 2009. Because he had dropped into non-League football, Rice found himself a part-time footballer and worked on a building site to supplement his income. Rice actually made fewer appearances in his first season as a full Truro player, playing 12 games compared to 20 when he was on loan. Two of these appearances were against Mangotsfield United and Maidenhead United in the FA Cup qualifying stages, but the rest of his appearances came in the league.

Rice's second full season at City was more successful, as he made 37 appearances in all competitions. Five of these appearances came in cup competitions, namely three games in the FA Trophy and two in the FA Cup qualifying rounds. Rice enjoyed more success in the league, keeping an impressive 14 clean sheets in 32 games. This rate of almost a clean sheet every other game was a step up from 2008–09, when the custodian only managed an average of one every four games.

During his time at the club, Rice helped the White Tigers to the Conference South, after they had been in the Southern Football League prior to his arrival. In the 2010–11 season, Rice kept six clean sheets as Truro went on a 10-game unbeaten run. He made his last appearance for Truro in a 3–2 loss to Falmouth Town on 12 July 2011, in the Aubrey Wilkes Trophy, just three days before he left for Torquay. In total, Rice made 69 appearances in all competitions for Truro.

Rice's contract with Truro stated that if a league club wanted to buy Rice, he would be allowed to leave. New Torquay manager Martin Ling heard about this clause and decided to sign Rice as cover for first-choice goalkeeper Bobby Olejnik.

=== Return to Torquay ===
==== 2011–12 ====
"I heard about Martin having an agreement with Truro that if a League club came in for him, he was allowed to leave. I felt it was an opportunity we couldn't miss because he's got experience, he's local, done the job before and fits the remit of a second-choice goalkeeper."

— Martin Ling on his reasons for re–signing Rice for Torquay United.

After two seasons with Truro, Rice returned to Torquay as one of new manager Martin Ling's first signings, with the deal being completed on 15 July 2011 and United registering the player on 30 July. Rice was likely to be backup to Austrian goalkeeper Bobby Olejnik, who was signed from Falkirk at around the same time. Rice made his second debut for the Gulls in the 2–0 friendly win over Bristol City, coming on at half-time for Olejnik. Rice missed the following friendly against his old club Exeter City, which resulted in a 3–0 win for the Gulls. However, he conceded his first goals in his second spell for Torquay in the 3–1 friendly loss to Burnley. Rice scored an unfortunate own goal in this match to make it 3–1 to Burnley.

Bobby Olejnik began the season as Torquay's first-choice goalkeeper. Rice was limited to reserve team football, including a 1–0 win against Yeovil Town reserves in which he kept a clean sheet, and the 3–1 loss to Brighton & Hove Albion reserves. He made his competitive debut for Torquay in the Football League Trophy on 30 August 2011 in the Gulls' 2–1 loss to Cheltenham Town. Rice had to wait until 10 January 2012 for his next first team appearance, playing in United's Devon Bowl quarter–final against Willand Rovers.Torquay eventually won the game on penalties, with Rice saving one of Willand's seven efforts, but Rice had his spot–kick saved. Rice suffered a groin strain soon afterwards and missed Torquay reserves' 3–2 loss to Bournemouth reserves on 17 January 2012. He was replaced in goal by youth team goalkeeper Aaron Ibbetson. Rice returned as first–choice goalkeeper for the reserves in their final Combination League fixture of the season, a 4–2 loss to Forest Green Rovers on 31 January 2012. The goalkeeper played in United's 1–1 friendly draw with Tiverton Town on 15 February 2012, and despite his performance being described as "outstanding" by Martin Ling, Rice was at fault for Tiverton's goal. On 21 February 2012, Rice played in Torquay's 3–0 loss to non-League Buckland Athletic in the quarter-finals of the Devon Bowl. Rice faced former club Exeter City on 27 February 2012 in a 1–1 friendly draw. He featured in Torquay's 1–1 friendly draw with Bideford AFC on 2 May 2012, making a number of important saves to earn a draw for his side.

After Torquay lost 2–0 to Cheltenham Town in the away leg of their play–off semi–final, some United fans called for Rice to be replaced on the bench by a more attacking option. However, Torquay manager Martin Ling defended his decision to retain the goalkeeper as one of his five substitutes for the home leg, saying "I won't go into the game without Martin Rice on the bench. If Bobby Olejnik gets injured in the first two minutes, we would be handing it over on a plate by not having a goalkeeper on the bench". At the end of the season, United left-back Kevin Nicholson nominated Rice as "Player of the Season" for his attitude and enthusiasm, which was also praised by Ling: "The enthusiasm and drive he brings to the place is phenomenal...I've been really pleased with how he has done the job as number two."

==== 2012–13 ====
Although Olejnik was sold to Peterborough United in June, Rice was still expected to begin the 2012–13 season as Torquay's second–choice goalkeeper behind new signing Michael Poke.

Rice made his first pre-season appearance in Torquay's first friendly, playing the opening 45 minutes in a 3–0 defeat of the Royal Marines on 20 July 2012. The goalkeeper was then introduced as a half-time substitute in United's 2–0 victory over Tiverton Town on 24 July. Rice also played the second 45 minutes of Torquay's 2–1 loss to Leeds United on 27 July. Four days later Rice returned to St James Park for a 3–3 draw with Exeter City in which he played the full ninety minutes.

Once more beginning the league campaign on the bench, Rice made his first appearance of the 2012–13 season in a 1–1 development game draw with Nike Football Academy on 4 September 2012. On 19 September, Rice played in another development game, a 2–1 win over AFC Bournemouth. Rice finally made his first league start for the first-team since rejoining Torquay in a 1–0 loss at Barnet on 6 November 2012, replacing the injured Michael Poke in the second half. With Poke still injured, Rice made his first ever Football League start and first league start since rejoining Torquay in a 0–0 draw with Oxford United; having made several crucial saves to preserve his team's clean sheet, Ling said the goalkeeper "came through [the game] with flying colours and made some great saves. He can be very proud of himself." Rice retained his place in the starting line-up for the visit of Southend United on 17 November, but following a 4–1 home defeat, he lost his place to the fit-again Poke. Rice saved a penalty in United's 3–0 shoot-out win over Liverton United in the Devon Bowl on 4 December 2012; he had earlier been booked and conceded a penalty. He replaced Michael Poke early in the 3–1 defeat to Bradford City on 1 April 2013 after Poke suffered a rib injury. Rice subsequently played the entirety of Torquay's 1–0 loss at Gillingham on 6 April 2013. Despite not featuring again in United's fight against relegation, on 9 May 2013 the club confirmed that Rice was one of seven players to be offered a new deal at the end of the season. On 24 May, Rice agreed a new contract to keep him at Plainmoor for the 2013–14 season.

==== 2013–14 ====
Although new manager Alan Knill also appeared to prefer Poke as the club's first choice goalkeeper, Poke picked up an injury early in pre-season and Rice therefore played in all of Torquay's friendlies. With Poke still only half-fit, Rice retained his place for the opening league game of the 2013–14 season against AFC Wimbledon on 3 August 2013; he made several excellent saves in a 1–1 draw and was named Man of the Match. He continued his fine form into Torquay's 1–0 loss at Swindon Town in the Football League Cup on 6 August, saving Alex Pritchard's penalty. Knill described his performance as "exceptional", adding "He looks calm and composed, and I'm really delighted for him. He hasn't always been a professional, so he clings on to it and understands we lead a privileged lifestyle." Rice's good form led to him winning the club's August and October Player of the Month awards for his "extravagant saves and solid handling".

=== 2015–present ===
On 25 April 2015 Rice departed Torquay United after both parties agreed to go their separate ways. On 3 July 2015 Rice signed for newly promoted Truro City.

Rice signed for Tiverton Town in June 2017 along with his Truro team-mate Ollie Knowles. He left the club in January 2018, with Tiverton manager Martyn Rogers commenting:"I thought Martin did well in the first half of the season, I just felt as though for some reason he's just gone off the boil a bit. I think it was affecting the defenders in front of him as well, so we just needed freshening up."

The goalkeeper subsequently joined Exmouth Town in March 2018.

== Personal life ==
Rice still lives in Exeter, the place of his birth. He has a son, Korban, of whom Rice has said "the majority of my spare time is taken up with him". While playing for Truro in 2010–2011, Rice lived in Topsham, Devon."

== Career statistics ==
Updated 15 July 2014

Club performance			League		Cup		League Cup		Other		Total	
Season	Club	League	Apps	Goals	Apps	Goals	Apps	Goals	Apps	Goals	Apps	Goals
England			League		FA Cup		League Cup		Other		Total	
2003–04	Exeter City	Conference Premier	7	0	2	0	0	0	2	0	11	0
2004–05	Exeter City	Conference Premier	15	0	2	0	0	0	0	0	17	0
2005–06	Exeter City	Conference Premier	5	0	0	0	0	0	1	0	6	0
2006–07	Exeter City	Conference Premier	28	0	0	0	0	0	0	0	28	0
2007–08	Torquay United	Conference Premier	9	0	2	0	0	0	3	0	14	0
2008–09	Truro City	Southern League Division One South & West	20	1	0	0	0	0	0	0	20	1
2009–10	Truro City	Southern League Premier Division	?	0	0	0	0	0	0	0	?	0
2010–11	Truro City	Conference South	?	0	0	0	0	0	0	0	?	0
2011–12	Torquay United	Football League Two	0	0	0	0	0	0	1	0	1	0
2012–13	Torquay United	Football League Two	5	0	0	0	0	0	0	0	5	0
2013–14	Torquay United	Football League Two	32	0	1	0	1	0	1	0	35	0
2014–15	Torquay United	Conference Premier	0	0	0	0	0	0	0	0	0	0
Total	England		163	1	7	0	1	0	8	0	179	1
Career total			163	1	7	0	1	0	8	0	179	1

== Honours ==
Truro City

- Southern Football League Division One South & West 2008–09: Champions
- Southern League Premier Division 2010–11: Champions
