= Taiwo Atieno =

English-born Kenyan footballer (born 1985)

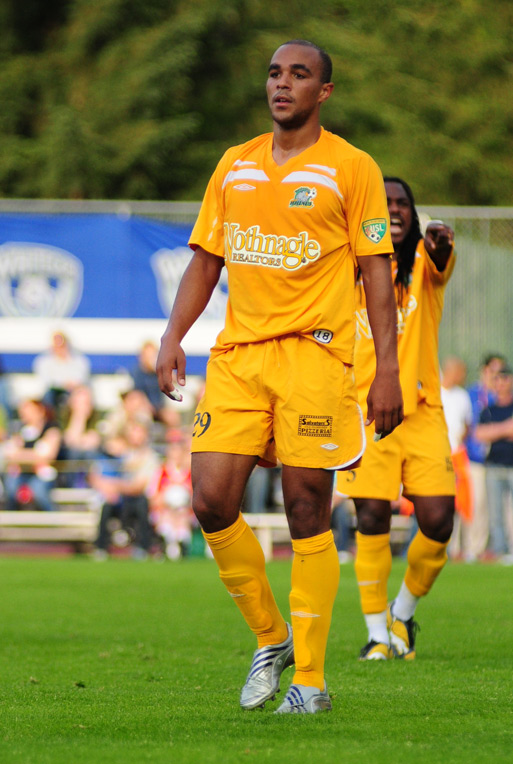

Personal information
- Full name: Opiyo Taiwo Leo Atieno Awounda
- Date of birth: 6 August 1985 (age 41)
- Place of birth: Brixton, England
- Position: Forward

Youth career
- 2000–2004: Walsall

Senior career*
Years	Team	Apps	(Gls)
2004–2006	Walsall	5	(0)
2004	→ Nuneaton Borough (loan)	3	(0)
2004–2005	→ Rochdale (loan)	13	(2)
2005	→ Chester City (loan)	4	(1)
2005–2006	→ Kidderminster Harriers (loan)	22	(5)
2006	→ Darlington (loan)	3	(0)
2006–2007	Tamworth	39	(12)
2007–2008	Puerto Rico Islanders	39	(12)
2009	Rochester Rhinos	23	(5)
2010–2011	Luton Town	13	(3)
2011	Stevenage	1	(0)
2011–2012	Torquay United	43	(6)
2012–2013	Barnet	4	(1)
Total		208	(44)

International career
2009–2012	Kenya	5	(0)
- * Club domestic league appearances and goals

Opiyo Taiwo Leo Atieno Awounda (born 6 August 1985) is a former professional footballer. Born in England, he represented Kenya in the qualifiers for the FIFA World Cup 2010 and the African cup of Nations. He previously played in the Football League for Walsall, Rochdale, Chester City, Darlington, Torquay United and Barnet and in the USL First Division for the Puerto Rico Islanders and Rochester Rhinos. He first appeared for the Kenya national team in June 2009.

== Early life ==
Opiyo Taiwo Leo Awounda was born in London, England. He is the son of Moussa Awounda, a former Nation Newspapers correspondent, and Bridget Mary Glaisher. He attended Alderwasley Hall School as a teenager.

== Club career ==
=== England ===
As a teen he began his football career at the age of 15 with Walsall F.C. After graduating from the club's youth system Taiwo lost his mother to cancer, during which time he spent a month with Southern League Premier Division club Nuneaton Borough on work experience, Atieno signed professional contract forms in July 2004 under then manager Paul Merson.

He had loan spells at Rochdale, Chester City with Ian Rush, Kidderminster Harriers, and Darlington. Atieno was released by the club at the end of the 2005–06 season following their relegation from League One.

After leaving Walsall F.C. Atieno joined Conference National club Tamworth in August 2006. Atieno scored 12 league goals, though these were not enough to keep Tamworth from relegation to the Conference North in April 2007.

=== United States ===
Atieno left Tamworth after the 2006–07 season, moving to the United States to join USL First Division team Puerto Rico Islanders.

Signing in July, Atieno started his spell well, scoring 7 goals in 12 games. The Islanders surpassed expectations reaching the semi-finals of the USL playoffs. Atieno providing 2 goals against an experienced Montreal Impact side. In the 2008 campaign, Atieno scored a historic goal advancing Puerto Rico Islanders to CONCACAF Champions League group stages. Islanders overcame a 2–1 deficit to knock out the Primera División de Costa Rica L.D. Alajuelense. L.D. Alajuelense was the first Costa Rican team to win a CONCACAF Champions' Cup in 1986.

In March 2009, Atieno joined Rochester Rhinos of the USL First Division; he had requested a trade due to losing his father to cancer and was traded to Charleston Battery during the off-season, but later choose to join Rochester Rhinos instead.

=== Back to England ===
He moved back to England with Conference Premier team Luton Town in March 2010 on a short-term contract, but left in July. After training with South African club Supersport United during the English summer, he rejoined Luton on 2 September 2010 on a contract until January 2011 after rejecting a deal with the South Africans. Atieno scored his first goal for Luton against Bath City on 30 October. This was then followed up with two goals in a 4–2 FA Cup First Round replay victory over Corby Town on 17 November. Atieno's goal-scoring form continued into January where he followed up a brace of goals in the FA Trophy against Uxbridge with the final goal (his seventh of the season in all competitions) in Luton's 5–0 home win over York City on 18 January 2011. Despite this goalscoring run, Luton opted not to extend Atieno's contract. He was released on 31 January.

On 11 February 2011, Atieno signed for League Two side Stevenage, and made his debut the next day, starting in their 1–0 away loss at Shrewsbury Town. It was to be Atieno's only appearance during Stevenage's 2010–11 campaign, and he was released by the club in May 2011 when his contract expired.

Ahead of the 2011–12 season, Atieno went on a two-week trial with League Two side Torquay United. He scored in the club's first pre-season friendly, scoring from the penalty spot in a 2–1 win against Tiverton Town on 13 July 2011. Three days later, Atieno scored again in Torquay's 2–0 victory over Championship side Bristol City. He signed a one-year contract with Torquay on 25 July 2011, with manager Martin Ling stating — "He has impressed us while he's been here and we've put in a contract that we feel is right". Atieno made his competitive debut for Torquay in the club's first game of the 2011–12 campaign, coming on as a 68th-minute substitute in a 2–2 draw at home to Burton Albion. A week later, Atieno scored his first goal for the club in a 2–1 win away at Bristol Rovers, finishing sharply on the turn. He was also awarded a penalty, which Rene Howe scored, for Torquay's second goal in the same match. On 13 and 17 May 2012, with Rene Howe injured, Taiwo was subbed on for the first leg of the play-off semi finals however failed to score. Similarly in the second leg he was subbed on however he did bag a goal, which only proved to be a consolation goal as Torquay United were beaten at home 2–1. Taiwo left Torquay United at the end of the season. On 26 December 2012, Atieno signed for Barnet with Edgar Davids . He made his debut as a 90th-minute substitute in a 2–2 draw away at Exeter City, and scored his first goal in a 2–0 home win over Bradford City. Atieno left the club by mutual consent on 1 February 2013.

== International career ==
In January 2009 Atieno declared his desire to play for the Kenya national football team, telling a reporter for the Kenyan newspaper Daily Nation "It has been my dream to play for Kenya since I was 13". After Kenya's immigration minister stated that Atieno had to renounce his British citizenship before he could be granted a Kenyan passport, this seemed unlikely. Though reports the following day suggested he had received his passport and could play in the World Cup qualifier against Tunisia, this appeared not to have been the case. He made his debut as a late substitute in the June 2009 qualifier against Mozambique, played the whole of a friendly defeat in Bahrain, was again a substitute in the second qualifier against Mozambique, and played 46 minutes in the 1–0 qualifying loss to Tunisia. On 29 February 2012, Atieno returned to the international side after three years away, gaining his fifth cap, coming on as an 85th-minute substitute in a 2–1 win over Togo in 2013 Africa Cup of Nations qualification.

== Personal life ==
In June 2025, Atieno was charged with the assault of Sugababes singer, Keisha Buchanan. He was charged with eight charges over a 13-year period including assault between 2012 and 2015. He was also charged with controlling or coercive behaviour against Buchanan. He was placed on bail at Harrow Crown Court with pleas to be entered in August 2025.

== Honours ==
Puerto Rico Islanders

- USL First Division Commissioner's Cup (1): 2008
