= Lloyd Macklin =

English footballer (born 1991)

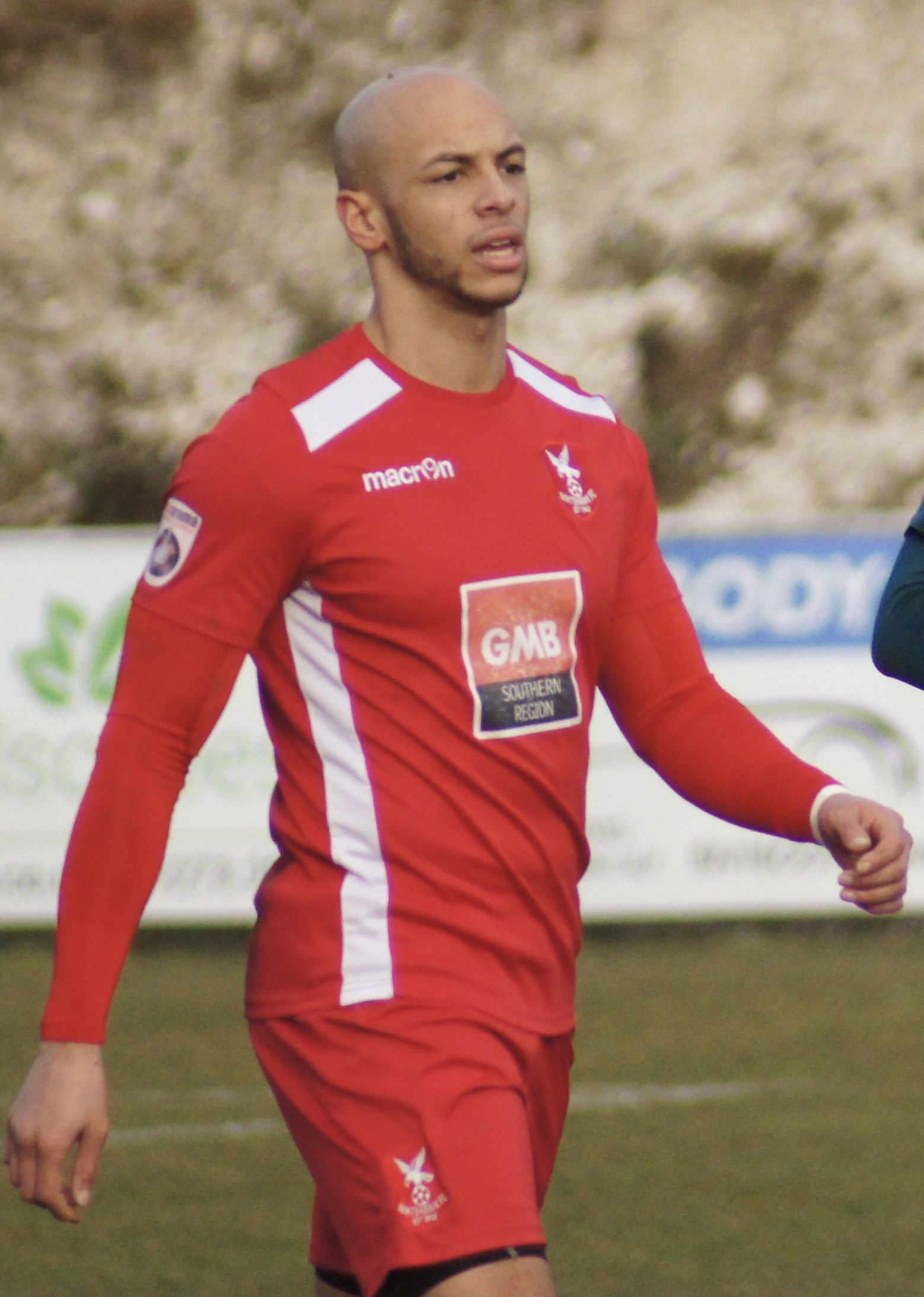
- Lloyd Macklin playing for Whitehawk 2018

Personal information
- Full name: Lloyd Joshua Macklin
- Date of birth: 2 August 1991 (age 35)
- Place of birth: Camberley, England
- Position: Midfielder

Youth career
- 2006–2007: Swindon Town

Senior career*
Years	Team	Apps	(Gls)
2007–2010	Swindon Town	11	(0)
2010	→ Torquay United (loan)	4	(0)
2010–2013	Torquay United	30	(0)
2011–2012	→ Salisbury City (loan)	3	(0)
2013	Farnborough	6	(1)
2013–2014	Chippenham Town	5	(0)
2014–2016	Basingstoke Town	62	(8)
2016	Hayes & Yeading	16	(4)
2016–2017	Metropolitan Police	14	(4)
2017	Welling United	5	(0)
2017–2018	Metropolitan Police	6	(5)
2018	Whitehawk	8	(3)
Total		170	(25)
- * Club domestic league appearances and goals

Lloyd Joshua Macklin (born 2 August 1991) is an English former footballer who played in the Football League with Swindon Town and Torquay United.

== Career ==
Macklin went on a pre-season tour of Austria with Swindon Town in the summer of 2007 when he was only 15 years old. He came through the ranks at Swindon and made a senior appearance in the home pre-season friendly with Bristol City. He then became the youngest ever player to represent Swindon at first team level, when he came on as a substitute against Brentford in the Football League Trophy in September 2007. He went on to feature for the youth and reserve teams as the 2007-08 campaign was played out, and continued working his way up through 2008–09. He made a couple of first team appearances towards the end of 2008–09.

On 19 February 2010, he joined Torquay United on loan for a month before joining on a permanent basis on 30 June 2010 as a free agent, following Swindon Town's failure to offer him a new contract. In October 2010, Macklin signed a contract extension that kept him at Plainmoor for a further two-years, until 2013. Macklin scored his first senior hat-trick for Torquay and in professional football against Cheltenham Town in the Football League Trophy on 30 August 2011, in a 4–3 defeat. At the end of the 2012–13 season, Macklin was one of seven players who did not feature in manager Alan Knill's plans and as a result was released.

Macklin signed for Farnborough in October 2013, before joining Chippenham Town in December. He was released by the Bluebirds a month later, after missing training.

After a successful 2014-2015 pre-season with Basingstoke Town, Macklin signed for them ready for the start of the new campaign. After two seasons at the Camrose, he joined Hayes & Yeading in May 2016 before signing for Metropolitan Police in October 2016, scoring on his debut against Grays Athletic.

Macklin signed for Welling United just after the start of the 2017–2018 season, but returned to Metropolitan Police in October 2017 after making just five appearances.

Macklin signed for Brighton-based National League South side Whitehawk in March 2018 but announced his retirement at the end of the 2017–18 season.

== Career statistics ==
As of match played 13 December 2017

Appearances and goals by club, season and competition
Club	Season	League			FA Cup		League Cup		Other		Total	
Club	Season	Division	Apps	Goals	Apps	Goals	Apps	Goals	Apps	Goals	Apps	Goals
Swindon Town	2007–08	League One	0	0	0	0	0	0	1 (Note: Appearances in the Football League Trophy)	0	1	0
Swindon Town	2008–09	League One	2	0	0	0	0	0	0	0	2	0
Swindon Town	2009–10	League One	9	0	1	0	2	0	0	0	12	0
Swindon Town	Swindon total		11	0	1	0	2	0	1	0	15	0
Torquay United (loan)	2009–10	League Two	4	0	0	0	0	0	0	0	4	0
Torquay United	2010–11	League Two	10	0	0	0	0	0	2 (Note: One appearance in the Football League Trophy and one in the League Two play-offs)	0	12	0
Torquay United	2011–12	League Two	4	0	0	0	1	0	1	1	6	1
Torquay United	2012–13	League Two	16	0	0	0	0	0	0	0	16	0
Torquay United	Torquay total		30	0	0	0	1	0	3	1	34	1
Salisbury City (loan)	2011–12	Conference South	3	0	3	1	—		1 (Note: Appearance in the FA Trophy)	0	7	1
Farnborough	2013–14	Conference South	6	1	0	0	—		1 (Note: Appearance in the Hampshire Senior Cup)	0	7	1
Chippenham Town	2013–14	SFL - Premier Division	5	0	0	0	—		0	0	5	0
Basingstoke Town	2014–15	Conference South	34	5	4	1	—		6 (Note: One appearance in the Hampshire Senior Cup; three appearances and a goal in the FA Trophy; two appearances in the Conference South play-offs)	1	44	7
Basingstoke Town	2015–16	National League South	28	3	4	1	—		5 (Note: Four appearances and a goal in the Hampshire Senior Cup; one appearance in the FA Trophy)	1	37	5
Basingstoke Town	Basingstoke total		62	8	8	2	0	0	11	2	81	12
Metropolitan Police	2016–17	Isthmian Premier Division	?	?	?	?	—		?	?	?	?
Welling United	2017–18	National League South	5	0	0	0	—		0	0	5	0
Career total			126	9	12	3	3	0	17	3	158	15
