= Saul Halpin =

English footballer

Personal information
- Date of birth: 25 October 1991 (age 35)
- Place of birth: Bodmin, England
- Position: Midfielder

Youth career
- 2007–2009: Torquay United

Senior career*
Years	Team	Apps	(Gls)
2009–2013	Torquay United	7	(0)
2013	→ Bideford (loan)	4	(0)
2013–2014	Bideford	6	(1)
2014	Shortwood United	7	(0)
2014	Westfields	?	(?)
2014–2015	Hawke's Bay United	18	(3)
2015–2016	Team Wellington	11	(1)
2016–2017	Hawke's Bay United	19	(12)
2017	Vestri	8	(4)
- * Club domestic league appearances and goals as of 4 December 2017

Saul Halpin (born 25 October 1991) is an English midfield footballer who most recently played for Icelandic club Vestri after previous spells with Torquay United and Bideford.

== Career ==
Halpin came through the college set-up and youth team at Torquay United and was offered a professional contract during the 2009–2010 season. His progress impressed the Torquay coaching staff as well as more senior players within the first team squad and manager Paul Buckle was quick to praise the left midfielder: "We have extended Saul's contract and he is now committed to the club for a further three years which is fantastic. The special thing about Saul is his age. He has come back looking very bright; he can go past people and has already upset a few of the senior players."

Halpin signed his second professional contract at Torquay United on 9 July 2010, months after signing his first professional contract, signing a three-year contract extension.

His Torquay debut came as a second-half replacement for fellow winger Danny Stevens in an FA Cup clash with Crawley Town on 29 January 2011. His league debut came several days later, where, once again, he came on as a second-half substitute for Danny Stevens.

In March 2011, Halpin had a trial with Derby County and impressed with a hat-trick in a 7–1 win against Nottingham Forest reserves.

In March 2013 Halpin was loaned to Bideford for one month, along with teammate Karl Baker.

At the end of the season, he was released by Torquay United along with six other players.

He joined Southern League side Shortwood United in January 2014.

After a short spell with Midland Alliance side Westfields he moved to New Zealand to play for Hawke's Bay United.

At the end of the Stirling Sports Premiership 16/17 season after scoring 12 goals in the league for Hawkes's Bay United, Halpin signed for Miramar Rangers.
