= Joe Oastler =

English footballer

Personal information
- Full name: Joseph James Oastler
- Date of birth: 3 July 1990 (age 36)
- Place of birth: Portsmouth, England
- Height: 5 ft 10 in (1.78 m)
- Positions: Defender; midfielder

Team information
- Current team: AFC Totton

Youth career
- 1998–2008: Portsmouth

Senior career*
Years	Team	Apps	(Gls)
2008	Bognor Regis Town	3	(0)
2008–2011	Queens Park Rangers	1	(0)
2009	→ Salisbury City (loan)	11	(0)
2010–2011	→ Torquay United (loan)	28	(0)
2011–2013	Torquay United	85	(1)
2013–2016	Aldershot Town	84	(3)
2016–2017	Gosport Borough	40	(1)
2017–2021	Oxford City	127	(6)
2021–2023	Havant & Waterloville	84	(8)
2023–	AFC Totton	2	(0)
- * Club domestic league appearances and goals as of 14:12, 13 October 2023 (UTC)

Joseph James Oastler (born 3 July 1990) is an English professional footballer who plays for AFC Totton as a defender.

== Playing career ==
Oastler was born in Portsmouth, Hampshire. He worked his way through the youth team of his local club Portsmouth, where he played from the age of eight; however, he was deemed surplus to requirements and was then released in March 2008. To retain fitness he joined Conference South club Bognor Regis Town, where he played three games, before joining the ranks of Queens Park Rangers in summer 2008.

He spent the first half of the 2009–10 season on loan at administration-stricken Salisbury City of the Conference National, along with teammate Lee Brown. He made eleven appearances for the club, including eight starts, before returning to Loftus Road before the end of the calendar year. At one point the club had feared that Oastler had fallen victim to the swine flu pandemic. On 20 April 2010 he made his debut in the Football League, replacing Ákos Buzsáky as a substitute in a 1–0 home win over Watford. At the end of the season Neil Warnock offered him a new one-year deal, which he duly signed. In October 2010 Oastler joined Torquay United signing on a month's loan and making his debut on 9 October in a 3–3 away draw against Crewe. He went on to make 19 starts and 12 sub appearances for Torquay, including a late cameo appearance in the Football League Two play-off final at Old Trafford.

In June 2011, Queens Park Rangers announced his release. Later that month, Oastler signed a permanent two-year deal with Torquay United. Oastler scored a lob from the half-way line against Tiverton Town in a pre-season friendly for the Gulls and also scored in the 6–2 friendly win over Truro City. Oastler made his league debut as a full Torquay player in the 2–2 draw against Burton Albion on 6 August 2011. He was included in the League Two Team of the Week for 13/14 August 2011, after a particularly impressive performance in the win over Bristol Rovers. He was released by Torquay at the end of the 2012–2013 season. Oastler joined Aldershot Town for the 2013–2014 season and scored on his league debut against Grimsby Town. His impressive form at the start of the season earned him a call up to the England C team to face Latvia.

Oastler completed a move to Oxford City ahead of the 2017–18 season, missing just 20 minutes of football throughout his first campaign at the club. Oastler ended the season by lifting the Oxfordshire Senior Cup as captain, and was made the permanent club captain ahead of 2018–19 season.

After 4 seasons with Oxford City, Oastler moved to Havant & Waterlooville in May 2021. He remained with the club until September 2023 when he joined Southern League Premier Division South club AFC Totton.

== Statistics ==
As of 28 June 2011.

Club performance			League		Cup		League Cup		Total	
Season	Club	League	Apps	Goals	Apps	Goals	Apps	Goals	Apps	Goals
England			League		FA Cup		League Cup		Total	
2007–08	Bognor Regis Town	Conference South	3	0	0	0	0	0	3	0
2008–09	Queens Park Rangers	Championship	0	0	0	0	0	0	0	0
2009–10	Queens Park Rangers	Championship	1	0	0	0	0	0	1	0
2009–10	Salisbury City	Conference National	11	0	0	0	0	0	0	11
2010–11	Queens Park Rangers	Championship	0	0	0	0	1	0	1	0
2010–11	Torquay United	League Two	28	0	3	0	0	0	31	0
2011–12	Torquay United	League Two	47	0	2	0	1	0	50	0
2012–13	Torquay United	League Two	38	1	0	0	1	0	39	1
Total	England		128	1	5	0	3	0	136	1
Career total			128	1	3	0	3	0	136	1
