= Rene Howe =

English footballer

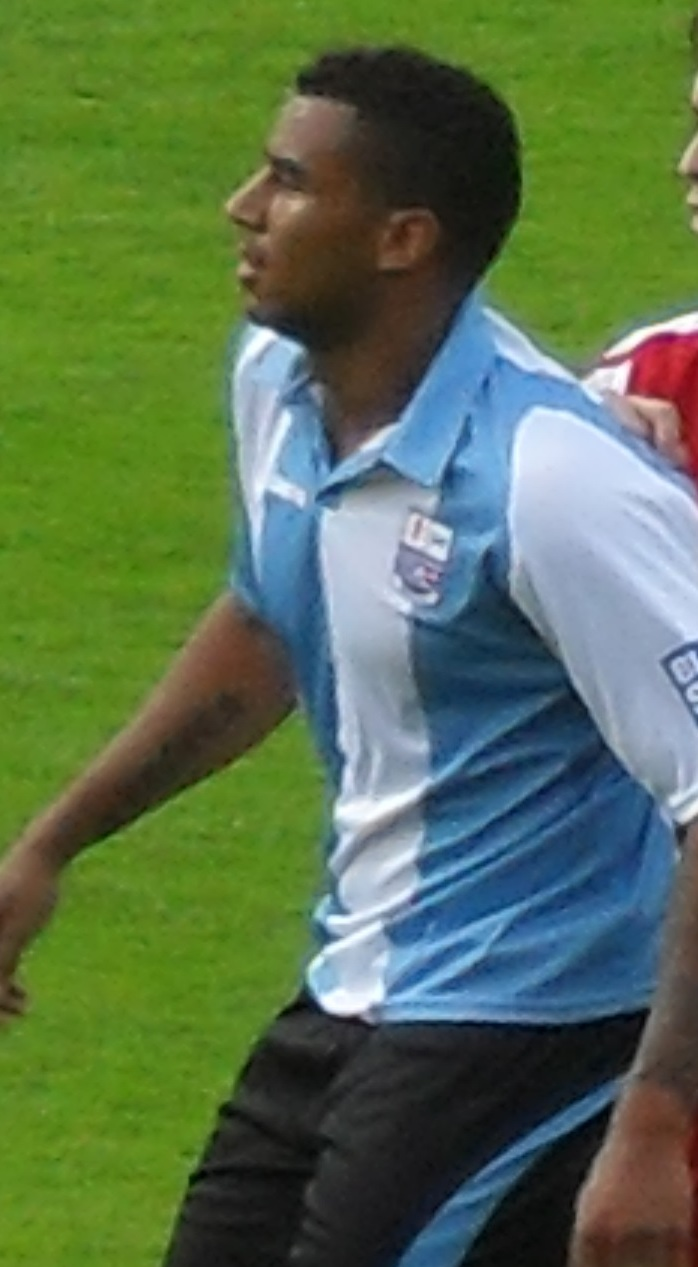
- Howe playing for Rushden & Diamonds in 2010

Personal information
- Full name: Jermaine Renee Howe
- Date of birth: 22 October 1986 (age 40)
- Place of birth: Bedford, England
- Height: 6 ft 2 in (1.88 m)
- Position: Striker

Team information
- Current team: Kings Langley

Senior career*
Years	Team	Apps	(Gls)
2003–2006	Bedford Town	81	(31)
2006–2007	Kettering Town	40	(25)
2007–2011	Peterborough United	15	(1)
2008	→ Rochdale (loan)	20	(9)
2008–2009	→ Morecambe (loan)	37	(10)
2009	→ Lincoln City (loan)	17	(5)
2010	→ Gillingham (loan)	18	(2)
2010–2011	→ Rushden & Diamonds (loan)	19	(6)
2011	→ Bristol Rovers (loan)	12	(1)
2011–2013	Torquay United	81	(28)
2013–2014	Burton Albion	15	(1)
2014–2015	Newport County	29	(3)
2015–2018	Kettering Town	107	(35)
2018	Hendon	15	(6)
2018–2019	Kings Langley	39	(11)
2019–2020	Walton Casuals	22	(9)
2020	Farnborough	5	(1)
2020–2022	Bedford Town	42	(33)
2022	Ware	14	(10)
2022–2023	Bedford Town	18	(2)
2023–	Kings Langley	18	(9)
- * Club domestic league appearances and goals as of 16:02, 30 June 2023 (UTC)

Jermaine Renee Howe (born 22 October 1986) is an English professional footballer who plays as a striker for Kings Langley.

Howe began his senior career at Bedford Town in 2003, making 81 league appearances prior to joining Kettering Town in 2006. Having scored 25 goals in 40 league games for Kettering, he switched to Peterborough United in May 2007. He struggled to break into the side, making just 18 appearances in four years, and spent loan spells at Rochdale, Morecambe, Lincoln City, Gillingham, Rushden & Diamonds and Bristol Rovers. He left Peterborough permanently in July 2011 when he switched to Torquay United, and he established himself in the side over the next two years. Having made 89 appearances for Torquay, Howe joined Burton Albion in July 2013 but left by mutual consent in January 2014. He subsequently joined Newport County managed by his former Rushden & Diamonds manager Justin Edinburgh.

After stints with Kettering (for a second time), and a short spell with Southern Football League side Hendon in the summer of 2018, Howe moved to fellow Southern League side Kings Langley in August 2018.

== Club career ==
=== Bedford Town ===
Born in Bedford, Bedfordshire, Howe was educated in Bedford at Mark Rutherford School. He also has trained as an electrician.

=== Kettering Town ===
He was signed by Kettering Town in 2006 from his hometown club, Bedford Town, after impressing for them. Manager Morell Maison believed that Howe would be a "sensational talent" after making history with the club by becoming the first Poppies player in almost half a century to score five goals in a game, in a 10–1 win over Clitheroe. Howe scored 25 goals in the 2006–07 season, helping Kettering to finish as runners-up in the Conference North.

=== Peterborough United ===
He was signed by Peterborough United on 2 May 2007 for an undisclosed fee. Upon the move, Howe says he aimed at the club was to score fifteen goals in his first season. He scored his first Posh goal against Brentford in November 2007.

With few appearances in his first Peterborough season, Howe went out on loan at Rochdale, until the end of the season. After impressing, Howe later joined Morecambe on loan for the 2008–09 season on 22 July 2008. He returned to Peterborough on 28 April 2009, one game before the end of Morecambe's season. In July, Director of football Barry Fry accepted a bid for Howe of £150,000 from an unnamed club. Instead, on 3 August, Howe signed a six-month loan deal with Lincoln City. He scored for Lincoln in their 3–1 defeat to Morecambe. In December 2009, he was sent back to Peterborough United after sustaining an injury.

On 20 January 2010, he joined Gillingham on loan until the end of the season. He scored his first goal for the Gills in his twelfth appearance during a 3–0 win against Southend United on 5 April. However, Manager Mark Stimson turned to sign Howe on a permanent basis, citing the price range is the main reason.

Ahead of the 2010–11 season, Howe went on trial at Southend United, but Director of football Fry stated the club wasn't keen to sign him. After playing on trial for the club in an August 2010 friendly against a West Brom XI side, Howe signed on loan for Rushden & Diamonds until the following January. Manager Justin Edinburgh played a role in convincing him to join the club, so he can kick-start his career. While on loan at Rushden and Diamonds, Howe stated his desire not to return to his parent club. Despite their effort to extend his loan, Rene returned to Peterborough on 1 January, following Rushden & Diamonds 3–0 defeat to Luton Town with manager Justin Edinburgh claiming there were numerous league clubs interested in signing Howe.

Howe joined Bristol Rovers on loan less than a month after his return from Rushden & Diamonds, and made his first team debut away to Walsall on 29 January when he came on as a substitute, replacing Jo Kuffour. Howe scored his first Rovers goal against Oldham Athletic on 19 February 2011. By 2 March 2011, Howe had his loan spell with the club extended until 30 April 2011. Howe also not ruling out to join Bristol Rovers on a permanent basis in the near future.

=== Torquay United ===
Howe joined Torquay United on a two-year contract on 13 July 2011 at Torquay United, having been released by Peterborough United in the summer. Ahead of the move, Manager Martin Ling commented about Howe, describing him as: "He's the type we need – he's big and strong and can score goals."

Howe scored in all three pre season home friendlies against Bristol City, Exeter City and Burnley after missing the first friendly against Tiverton Town. Howe also scored on his league debut for Torquay, in the 2–2 draw with Burton Albion and scored again, in the next match, in a 2–1 win against his former club, Bristol Rovers. Then, on 25 October 2011, Howe scored his first brace of the season, in a 4–0 win over Wimbledon, ending their eight matches winless streak, starting since 10 September 2011. Then, on 16 December 2011, in a 4–0 win over Accrington Stanley, Howe received a straight red card for his challenge on Dean Winnard, in a 3–1 loss. His dismissal earned him a four match suspension. Having served his four-game ban, Howe made his return, coming on as a substitute in the 71st minute, in a 2–1 win over Morecambe. Later in the 2011/12 season, Howe goalscoring added five more goals to his tally. In League Two play-off's, against Cheltenham Town, Howe come off as a substitute in the 21st minute after a hamstring injury and causing him to miss the next leg, which Torquay United lose again. In his first season at Torquay, he was the first-choice striker and both top scorer in the league, jointing with Lee Mansell and all competitions with fourteen; also a key-player to the club that send the club to the League Two play-off's by finishing fifth place. However, Howe was the player who was sent off most often for the club twice and scored fourteen goals in forty-three appearances in all competitions.

In 2012–13 season, Howe retained his first choice striker despite the arrival of Ryan Jarvis. Howe scored his first goal of the season, in a 2–2 draw against Cheltenham Town on 21 August 2012 and then scored twice in a 4–2 win over Rochdale. One month later, on 18 September 2012, Howe started scoring eight goals in eight consecutive games. It was ended on 23 October, in a match against Gillingham. Later in the 2012/13 season, Howe goalscoring form added six more goals to his tally and formed a new partnership with Elliot Benyon, under manager Alan Knill. Once again, Howe was the club's top scorer this season for the second time running and was awarded the Top Goalscorer honour.

At the end of the 2012–13 season, Howe was offered a new deal, but he rejected the offer of a new contract in July 2013, leading attracted interests from clubs like Southend United, York City and Hibernian.

=== Burton Albion ===
Following his release from Torquay United, Howe signed for Burton Albion on a two-year contract on 13 July 2013. He scored his first goal for the club on 17 August 2013 in a 3–2 victory over Fleetwood Town.

=== Newport County ===
Howe was released by Burton Albion in January 2014 and joined Newport County under his former Rushden & Diamonds manager Justin Edinburgh. He made his debut for Newport in the 3–3 draw versus Accrington Stanley on 12 January. He scored his first goal for Newport on 25 January 2014 in the 3–1 defeat at Bristol Rovers. On 25 March 2015 Howe was released from his contract with Newport on compassionate grounds due to a serious family illness.

=== Return to Non-League ===
Howe rejoined Kettering Town currently in the Southern League Premier for his 2nd spell on 20 November subject to international clearance from the Welsh FA.

In August 2020, Howe returned to his first club Bedford Town. The 2021–22 season saw Bedford Town win the Southern Football League Division One Central title, Howe finishing as the league's top goalscorer with 27 goals before departing the club.

In July 2022, Howe joined Ware. He returned to Bedford Town in December.

In June 2023, Howe returned to Kings Langley.
