= Michael Poke =

English footballer (born 1985)

Personal information
- Full name: Michael Harold Poke
- Date of birth: 21 November 1985 (age 41)
- Place of birth: Staines, England
- Height: 6 ft 1 in (1.85 m)
- Position: Goalkeeper

Youth career
- 2004–2010: Southampton

Senior career*
Years	Team	Apps	(Gls)
2004–2010	Southampton	4	(0)
2005	→ Oldham Athletic (loan)	0	(0)
2005	→ Northampton Town (loan)	0	(0)
2006–2007	→ Woking (loan)	3	(0)
2008	→ Torquay United (loan)	4	(0)
2008–2009	→ Torquay United (loan)	13	(0)
2009–2010	→ Torquay United (loan)	29	(0)
2010–2012	Brighton & Hove Albion	0	(0)
2012	→ Bristol Rovers (loan)	8	(0)
2012–2014	Torquay United	57	(0)
2014–2016	Portsmouth	0	(0)
2015	→ Eastleigh (loan)	9	(0)
2016	Eastleigh	3	(0)
2016–2017	Woking	35	(0)
Total		165	(0)
- * Club domestic league appearances and goals as of 29 April 2017 (UTC)

Michael Harold Poke (born 21 November 1985) is an English former professional footballer who played as a goalkeeper. He was most recently goalkeeping coach of Portsmouth.

== Football career ==
=== Southampton ===
Born in Staines, Surrey, Poke attended Longford Community School in Tachbrook Road, Feltham before joining Southampton as a trainee. He had a trial with Northampton Town in August 2004, playing in a scoreless reserve game against Gillingham on 17 August. He remained with Southampton, and with Antti Niemi injured, was named as a substitute for the League Cup tie against Watford in November 2004.

He joined Oldham Athletic on loan in August 2005, but failed to make his debut and suffered a fractured finger.

In October 2005 he joined Northampton Town on loan, making his debut in the 5–2 Football League Trophy win at home to Notts County on 18 October. His loan was extended for a second month, but his only other game for the Cobblers also came in the Football League Trophy, playing in the 3–2 defeat away to Colchester United on 23 November.

On 23 November 2006, he moved on loan to Woking (under manager Glenn Cockerill, a former Southampton player) until Christmas.

In the summer of 2007 Poke was the only fit goalkeeper that Southampton could take on their tour of Norway, making his full debut for the club in the 12–0 demolition of part timers Svarstad.

On 9 January 2008 Poke went on loan to Conference National side Torquay United, taking over as first choice from Martin Rice who had recently taken over the role himself from Simon Rayner. Poke was recalled by Southampton in February 2008 due to an ongoing injury crisis. He had played four Conference games for Torquay, against Salisbury City, Histon, Kidderminster Harriers and Weymouth, without conceding a single goal. He made his Southampton debut on 4 March 2008 at Wolverhampton Wanderers as a half-time substitute for the injured Kelvin Davis. Poke himself was injured later that month to give Southampton three injured goalkeepers.

On 22 July 2008, Poke rejoined Torquay on a season-long loan. However, he was injured early in the season, resulting in Torquay having to loan Scott Bevan from Shrewsbury Town as cover.

On 1 September 2009, Poke was again loaned out to Torquay United for a third spell at the newly promoted League Two side. On 23 December, Poke extended his loan deal with the Gulls till the end of the season. On 15 May 2010, Poke was named in a list of 13 players to be released from Southampton before the start of the 2010–11 season.

=== Brighton & Hove Albion ===
In June 2010, Poke joined League One side Brighton & Hove Albion on a one-year contract.

On 1 January 2012 it was announced that Poke would join Bristol Rovers on loan for an initial one-month period, which was then extended to the rest of the season.

Poke, along with fellow goalkeeper David González, was released by Brighton at the end of April 2012 following the expiration of his contract.

=== Torquay United ===
On 27 June 2012, Poke rejoined Torquay United on a 2-year contract on a free transfer. Martin Ling signed the keeper on recommendation from goalkeeper coach Kenny Veysey. Ling stated "I tried to sign him last summer and it never came off because Brighton didn't want Michael to leave, but he is an ideal replacement for Bobby Olejnik and will work well in the goalkeeping unit with Kenny and Martin Rice."

=== Portsmouth ===
On 24 June 2014, Poke signed for Portsmouth on a two-year deal after leaving Torquay due to the latter's relegation to Conference Premier.

=== Eastleigh ===
After being limited to opportunities at Portsmouth, Poke joined National League side Eastleigh on loan until January 2016. On 8 August 2015, Poke made his Eastleigh debut in a 4–0 away victory over Southport. However, after impressing within the first few games of his loan spell, Poke suffered a minor shoulder injury in late September, therefore causing Portsmouth to recall him.

On 29 January 2016, Poke returned to Eastleigh, this time joining on a permanent deal until the end of the 2015–16 campaign. After being deployed as a back-up to Ross Flitney, Poke finally made his Eastleigh return in a 3–0 away defeat to Lincoln City. However, after conceding eight goals in three consecutive games, Poke was once again dropped by manager Chris Todd.

=== Woking ===
On 8 July 2016, Poke signed for National League side Woking on a one-year deal. On 6 August 2016, he made his Woking debut in a 3–1 home defeat against Lincoln City. On 17 September 2016, Poke registered his first clean sheet for Woking in their 2–0 home victory over Wrexham. On 23 May 2017, it was announced that Poke would leave Woking upon the expiry of his current deal in June 2017.

== Coaching career ==
In June 2021, Poke was appointed first-team goalkeeping coach at his former club Portsmouth having worked with the academy since March 2020. Poke stepped down from the role in June 2022 for family and travel reasons.

== Career statistics ==
As of match played 29 April 2017.

Club	Season	League			FA Cup		League Cup		Other		Total	
Club	Season	Division	Apps	Goals	Apps	Goals	Apps	Goals	Apps	Goals	Apps	Goals
Southampton	2007–08	Championship	4	0	0	0	0	0	—		4	0
Northampton Town (loan)	2005–06	League Two	0	0	0	0	0	0	2 (Note: Appearance(s) in Football League Trophy)	0	2	0
Woking (loan)	2006–07	Conference Premier	3	0	0	0	—		0	0	3	0
Torquay United (loan)	2007–08	Conference Premier	4	0	0	0	—		0	0	4	0
Torquay United (loan)	2008–09	Conference Premier	13	0	0	0	—		2 (Note: Appearance(s) in 2008–09 Conference Premier play-offs)	0	15	0
Torquay United (loan)	2009–10	League Two	29	0	1	0	0	0	0	0	30	0
Torquay United (loan)	Total		46	0	1	0	0	0	2	0	49	0
Brighton & Hove Albion	2010–11	League One	0	0	0	0	1	0	0	0	1	0
Bristol Rovers (loan)	2011–12	League Two	8	0	1	0	0	0	0	0	9	0
Torquay United	2012–13	League Two	43	0	1	0	1	0	1	0	46	0
Torquay United	2013–14	League Two	14	0	0	0	0	0	0	0	14	0
Torquay United	Total		57	0	1	0	1	0	1	0	60	0
Eastleigh (loan)	2015–16	National League	9	0	0	0	—		0	0	9	0
Eastleigh	2015–16	National League	3	0	0	0	—		0	0	3	0
Woking	2016–17	National League	35	0	0	0	—		0	0	35	0
Career total			165	0	3	0	2	0	5	0	175	0
