= Chris McPhee =

English footballer (born 1983)

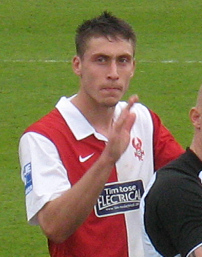
- McPhee with Kidderminster Harriers in 2009

Personal information
- Full name: Chris McPhee
- Date of birth: 20 March 1983 (age 43)
- Place of birth: Eastbourne, England
- Height: 1.80 m (5 ft 11 in)
- Position: Striker

Youth career
- –1999: Brighton & Hove Albion

Senior career*
Years	Team	Apps	(Gls)
1999–2006	Brighton & Hove Albion	60	(4)
2005	→ Aldershot Town (loan)	14	(2)
2006	→ Swindon Town (loan)	8	(0)
2006–2007	Torquay United	37	(0)
2007–2008	Ebbsfleet United	44	(5)
2008–2009	Weymouth	30	(7)
2009–2011	Kidderminster Harriers	103	(31)
2011–2012	Torquay United	26	(2)
2012–2014	Salisbury City	82	(16)
2014–2016	Weymouth	53	(5)
2016	Frome Town	10	(1)
2016–2017	Bideford	24	(1)
2017–2018	Bodmin Town		
2018	Buckland Athletic		
Total		491	(74)

International career
2008	England C	3	(0)

Managerial career
- 2014–2018: Exeter City (youth)
- 2018: Buckland Athletic (assistant)
- 2018–2024: Exeter City U18 (assistant)
- 2024–2026: Plymouth Parkway
- 2026 -: Tavistock (assistant)
- * Club domestic league appearances and goals

Chris McPhee (born 20 March 1983) is an English football coach and former player who is currently the assistant manager of Western Premier League club Tavistock.

== Career ==
Born in Eastbourne, East Sussex, McPhee began his career as a trainee with Brighton & Hove Albion, turning professional in August 1999, and made his debut, aged 16, at Swansea City in December 1999. He broke into the first team on a regular basis in the 2003–04 and 2004–05 seasons, when he made over 50 appearances despite missing several months of the 2004–05 season due to a foot injury suffered in October 2004.

McPhee joined Conference National side Aldershot Town on loan in August 2005, where he made 14 appearances. He returned to Brighton in November 2005 but struggled to break into the first team and made only seven appearances before joining Swindon Town in March 2006 on loan until the end of the 2005–06 season. He was released by Brighton after the club was relegated from the Championship at the end of the 2005–06 season and joined Torquay United in July 2006, making his Torquay debut in the 1–0 home win against Rochdale in the following month. He made 43 league and cup appearances for Torquay in the 2006–07 season.

McPhee joined Ebbsfleet United in August 2007 on non-contract terms after impressing in a trial period and after making 20 appearances for Ebbsfleet in the Conference National, he agreed a contract in November 2007 until the end of the 2007–08 season. In May 2008, he scored the winning goal as Ebbsfleet won the 2007–08 FA Trophy at Wembley Stadium against Torquay United and was named "Man of the Match" after the game. McPhee also won Player of the Season that year, voted for by the fans. He left Ebbsfleet in June 2008, after participating in a successful Four Nations Tournament campaign with England C, when he failed to agree a new deal with the Fleet. He turned down several League offers and moved to Devon to be with his new family.

McPhee joined Weymouth on 3 July 2008. He signed for Kidderminster Harriers on a contract until the end of the 2008–09 season on 26 February after leaving Weymouth, who had not paid his wages during 2009. He signed a new two-year contract with Kidderminster in July.

On 28 June 2011, it was announced that McPhee was to rejoin former club, Torquay United.

After the 2011–12 season, Chris moved to Salisbury City, he signed as a player-coach. Chris was looking at moving into coaching after his playing career ended and so cited a move to Salisbury as beneficial to this. The move to Salisbury was made more attractive because of the opportunities to coach as well as play regularly.

== Coaching career ==
Chris McPhee was coaching full time at Exeter City's academy as the Youth Development Phase lead coach. Chris Holds a UEFA A coach's licence and an FA Advanced Youth Award Qualification.

On 16 May 2024, McPhee was appointed manager of Southern League Premier Division South club Plymouth Parkway. On 2 March 2026, McPhee was relieved of his duties, with Parkway sitting second from bottom, and four points from safety in the Southern League Premier Division South.

== Honours ==
Brighton & Hove Albion

- League 2 title: 2000-2001
- League 1 title: 2001-2002
- League 1 playoffs: 2003-2004

Ebbsfleet United

- FA Trophy: 2008

Salisbury City

- Conference South play-offs: 2012–13
