= Kevin Nicholson (footballer) =

English footballer (born 1980)

Personal information
- Full name: Kevin John Nicholson
- Date of birth: 2 October 1980 (age 46)
- Place of birth: Derby, England
- Position: Left back

Team information
- Current team: Exeter City (assistant manager)

Youth career
- 199?–1998: Sheffield Wednesday

Senior career*
Years	Team	Apps	(Gls)
1998–2001	Sheffield Wednesday	1	(0)
2001	→ Forest Green Rovers (loan)	1	(0)
2001	Northampton Town	7	(0)
2001–2004	Notts County	95	(3)
2004	→ Scarborough (loan)	13	(1)
2004–2006	Scarborough	82	(4)
2006–2007	Forest Green Rovers	44	(6)
2007–2014	Torquay United	314	(13)
2014–2015	Kidderminster Harriers	43	(1)
2015	Bath City	11	(1)
2015–2017	Torquay United	19	(0)
2018–2019	Mousehole		
Total		630	(31)

International career
2007–2009	England C	4	(0)

Managerial career
- 2015–2017: Torquay United
- 2018–2019: Mousehole
- 2022: Exeter City (caretaker manager)
- * Club domestic league appearances and goals

Kevin John Nicholson (born 2 October 1980) is an English former professional footballer who is assistant manager of Exeter City.

== Playing career ==
Born in Derby, Nicholson began his career as a trainee with Sheffield Wednesday, turning professional in August 1998. His first team debut came on 28 August 2000 when he replaced Andy Hinchcliffe as a first-half substitute in Wednesday's 1–1 draw at home to Blackburn Rovers. However, this was his only first team appearance for Wednesday as he was allowed to join Forest Green Rovers on loan in January 2001, before moving to Northampton Town on a free transfer the following month.

In March 2001, Nicholson joined Notts County on a free transfer, and soon became a regular in the County side. He joined Scarborough on loan in March 2004, scoring on his debut and moved to Scarborough on a free transfer at the end of the season. He was a regular in Scarborough's Conference National side for the next two seasons, but left in May 2006 to join Forest Green Rovers after Scarborough's relegation to the Conference North amid financial problems that would see the club dissolved a year later.

His form with Forest Green earned Nicholson a call-up to the England C squad for the Home Internationals, and suggestions of a move back to the football league with Barnet, managed by England C boss Paul Fairclough. However, Nicholson joined Torquay United on a free transfer on 20 June 2007.

He spent seven years with Torquay but after their relegation from the Football League in May 2014 he was released by the club.

On 7 August 2014, Nicholson signed non-contract terms with Kidderminster Harriers. On 9 August 2014, he made his debut for Kidderminster in a goalless draw away at Lincoln City. On 1 November 2014, he scored his first goal for the Harriers against former club Torquay United. On 15 November 2014, Nicholson signed a contract with Kidderminster Harriers until the end of the season. After the last game of the season, a 2–1 loss away to Eastleigh, Kevin announced that he would not be signing a new contract and was looking for a new club.

In July 2015, Nicholson signed for Bath City.

== Coaching career ==
On 28 September 2015, it was announced by the club that Kevin Nicholson, former Torquay United player would be the club's new player-manager. Torquay United Chairman, David Phillips was quoted as saying "We are delighted to have Kevin on board as player-manager. As a player for the club, he displayed outstanding consistency over many years and is quite rightly regarded as a legend here". After a slow start to his managerial career Kevin brought in a group of new players in the January transfer window and led Torquay to an unlikely escape from a near-certain relegation, earning him such nicknames as 'The Ranieri of the Riviera'. After a summer of financial uncertainty at Torquay Kevin retained his position as manager for the 2016/17 season with a smaller squad than before, and one that made a better start than in 2015/16, but failed to continue their excellent form from the end of that season when they engineered the great escape. Despite that by the end of September the team seemed to have settled into a mid table position showing flashes of previous form but seeming unlikely to press for the promotional places on the basis of their inconsistent performances and lack of finance.

In August 2017, following a poor start to the 2017-18 season, Nicholson departed Torquay.

Nicholson joined South West Peninsula League club Mousehole as player-manager and director of the associated Endorsed Academy. Despite achieving an 85% winning record at the club, he left in June 2019 as he was unable to commit to a new academy structure.

In August 2019 he became head of coaching at Exeter City.

On 4 October 2022, first-team manager Matt Taylor was appointed manager of Rotherham United with Nicholson being appointed caretaker manager. Nicholson oversaw six matches in charge of the first-team, having a 50% win record with three wins and three defeats. Following the appointment of Gary Caldwell, Nicholson continued to work closely with the first-team and was appointed assistant manager on 10 November 2022.

== Managerial statistics ==
As of match played 22 October 2022

Managerial record by team and tenure
Team	From	To	Record					Ref
Team	From	To	P	W	D	L	Win %	Ref
Torquay United	28 September 2015	17 August 2017	93	28	23	42	30.1	
Exeter City (caretaker)	4 October 2022	24 October 2022	6	3	0	3	50.0	
Total			99	31	23	45	31.3	—

== Honours ==
Individual

- PFA Team of the Year: 2011–12 League Two
