= Danny Stevens (footballer, born 1986) =

English footballer

Personal information
- Full name: Danny Robert Stevens
- Date of birth: 26 November 1986 (age 39)
- Place of birth: Enfield, England
- Height: 5 ft 4 in (1.63 m)
- Position: Midfielder

Youth career
- –2005: Tottenham Hotspur

Senior career*
Years	Team	Apps	(Gls)
2005–2007	Luton Town	1	(0)
2007–2013	Torquay United	181	(25)
2014	Torquay United	6	(0)
2015–2016	Whitehawk	12	(0)
- * Club domestic league appearances and goals as of 04:35, 4 December 2017 (UTC)

Danny Robert Stevens (born 26 November 1986 in Enfield) is an English former football winger who last played for Whitehawk in National League South. He can play on either the left or right flank.

== Career ==
After being spotted whilst playing for Brimsdown Rovers' Junior teams, Stevens joined Tottenham Hotspur as an eight-year-old and progressed to an apprenticeship. He was released by Tottenham and joined Luton Town in March 2005. He made his league debut on 30 April 2006, as a second-half substitute for Dean Morgan in the 1–1 draw away to Burnley, Luton conceding an equaliser just three minutes after Stevens' introduction. He was awarded a new contract in 2006, but did not feature the following season and was released by Luton in May 2007.

Following a pre-season trial, Stevens was signed by Torquay manager Paul Buckle on a one-year contract on 20 July 2007. He made his Torquay debut as a substitute in the first game of the season, and scored his first senior level goal after coming off their bench in their second, against Aldershot Town on 15 August 2007.

On 11 November 2007, Stevens scored two goals live on BBC television which completed a FA Cup upset; a 4–1 win over West Country rivals Yeovil Town.

In the summer of 2008, Stevens signed a new one-year contract with Torquay United.

On 13 June 2009, Stevens collected the 2008–09 Young Player of the Year award at the Football Conference Congress Awards, after winning promotion to the Football League through the Conference after beating Cambridge United 2–0 at Wembley Stadium on 17 May 2009.

At the start of 2010, Stevens' replica shirt replaced Chris Hargreaves' on Soccer AM after the latter's move to Oxford United in the January transfer window.

In the summer of 2011, Stevens signed a new two-year deal with Torquay United.

On 9 May 2013, Torquay confirmed that Stevens was one of seven players released by new manager Alan Knill.

Following his release from Torquay, he had trials at Leyton Orient and Aldershot Town, but failed to earn a contract at either club.

On 30 January 2014, Torquay signed Stevens on a short contract until the end of the season. He subsequently made the first appearance of his second spell with the club as a substitute against Accrington Stanley on 22 February 2014. He made his first start against Burton Albion on 25 February 2014. He left the club in the summer.

== Career statistics ==
As of 4 December 2017

Club	Season	League			FA Cup		League Cup		Other^{[A]}		Total	
Club	Season	Division	Apps	Goals	Apps	Goals	Apps	Goals	Apps	Goals	Apps	Goals
Luton Town	2005–06	Championship	1	0	0	0	0	0	0	0	1	0
Luton Town	2006–07	Championship	0	0	0	0	0	0	0	0	0	0
Torquay United	2007–08	Conference	29	2	2	2	0	0	3	0	34	4
Torquay United	2008–09	Conference	31	5	2	0	0	0	0	0	33	5
Torquay United	2009–10	League Two	27	1	3	0	1	0	2	2	33	3
Torquay United	2010–11	League Two	37	3	4	0	1	0	3	0	45	3
Torquay United	2011–12	League Two	41	8	2	2	1	0	1	0	45	10
Torquay United	2012–13	League Two	16	3	1	0	0	0	1	0	18	3
Torquay United	2013–14	League Two	6	0	0	0	0	0	0	0	6	0
Whitehawk	2015–16	National League South	12	0	0	0	0	0	1	0	13	0
Whitehawk	2016–17	National League South	2	0	0	0	0	0	0	0	2	0
Whitehawk	Career totals		202	25	14	4	3	0	11	2	230	28

A. The "Other" column constitutes appearances (including substitutes) and goals in the 2007–08 FA Trophy, 2009–10 Football League Trophy, 2010–11 Football League Trophy, 2010–11 League Two play-offs, 2011–12 League Two play-offs & 2012–13 Football League Trophy.
