= 2010–11 Torquay United F.C. season =

Torquay United
2010–11 season
- Chairman: Simon Baker
- Manager: Paul Buckle (until 30 May 2011); Martin Ling (from 13 June 2011)
- League Two: 7th
- FA Cup: Fourth round
- League Cup: First Round
- League Trophy: Second Round
- Top goalscorer: League: Chris Zebroski (14); All: Chris Zebroski (15)
- Highest home attendance: 5,065 v Crawley Town, 29 January 2011 (FA Cup)
- Lowest home attendance: 1,514 v Rotherham United, 1 March 2011 (League Two)
- Average home league attendance: 2,630
Home colours	Away colours

The 2010–11 Torquay United F.C. season was Torquay United's 75th season in the Football League and their second consecutive season in League Two. The season runs from 1 July 2010 to 30 June 2011.

== Overview ==
Carrying on their good form from the end of the 2009–10 season, which saw Torquay set a new club record of 691 minutes without conceding a goal, the Gulls won their first four games of the new League Two campaign making it the best ever start to a season in the club's history. Unfortunately, Torquay were finally to concede a goal in the last of those four matches which meant the club record for clean sheets was now established at 998 minutes. Despite making a strong start to the season and spending the whole of August at the top of the table, Torquay's form was soon to dip to the extent that they were only to win another three League matches by the end of the year. Nevertheless, some respite was offered by the cup competitions. Despite the Gulls experiencing early exits in the First Round of the Carling Cup (to Reading) and the Second Round of the Johnstone Paint's Trophy (losing to Swindon Town after first defeating Bournemouth), Torquay again made a strong showing in the FA Cup. Having beaten Mansfield Town, Walsall and Carlisle United in the earlier rounds, Torquay reached the fourth round of the FA Cup where they were eventually beaten 1–0 in an ill-tempered tie with Conference side Crawley Town.

Following the defeat by Crawley, Torquay's League form finally began to improve and a run of just three defeats in their last 21 matches was enough to seal a place in the play-off semi-finals. This was despite the sale of leading goalscorer Elliot Benyon to Swindon and the fact that the Gulls were docked one point by the Football League for fielding loan signing Jake Robinson while still ineligible to play. Torquay saw off their semi-final opponents Shrewsbury Town with relative ease to set up a League Two play-off final clash with Stevenage. However, the Gulls' season was ultimately to end in disappointment with a 1–0 defeat in the final and the departure of manager Paul Buckle for Bristol Rovers just two days afterwards.

== League statistics ==
=== League Two ===
Pos	Team	Pld	W	D	L	GF	GA	GD	Pts	Promotion, qualification or relegation
5	Accrington Stanley	46	18	19	9	73	55	+18	73	Qualification to League Two play-offs
6	Stevenage (O, P)	46	18	15	13	62	45	+17	69	Qualification to League Two play-offs
7	Torquay United	46	17	18	11	74	53	+21	68 (Note: Torquay United deducted one point and Hereford United deducted three points)	Qualification to League Two play-offs
8	Gillingham	46	17	17	12	67	57	+10	68	
9	Rotherham United	46	17	15	14	75	60	+15	66	

Updated to match(es) played on 28 May 2011. Source: The Football League
Rules for classification: 1) points; 2) goal difference; 3) number of goals scored.
(O) Play-off winners; (P) Promoted

==== Results summary ====
Overall								Home						Away					
Pld	W	D	L	GF	GA	GD	Pts	W	D	L	GF	GA	GD	W	D	L	GF	GA	GD
46	17	18	11	74	53	+21	68^{*}	10	8	5	36	22	+14	7	10	6	38	31	+7

Source: Torquay United

*Deducted 1 point for fielding an unregistered player.

==== Results by round ====
Round	1	2	3	4	5	6	7	8	9	10	11	12	13	14	15	16	17	18	19	20	21	22	23	24	25	26	27	28	29	30	31	32	33	34	35	36	37	38	39	40	41	42	43	44	45	46
Ground	H	A	H	A	A	H	A	H	H	A	A	H	A	H	A	H	A	A	A	A	H	H	A	H	H	H	A	H	H	A	A	H	H	A	H	A	A	H	A	H	A	H	H	A	H	A
Result	W	W	W	W	L	D	D	L	L	D	D	L	D	W	W	D	D	W	L	D	L	W	L	D	L	W	W	W	D	D	L	D	W	L	W	W	D	W	D	W	W	D	D	D	D	L
Position	1	1	1	1	2	1	4	5	6	8	8	11	13	8	7	7	7	6	7	10	11	10	11	11	14	12	10	10	9	10	11	11	8	8	8	8	7	4	4	6	5	5	5	8	6	7

Source: Torquay United
A = Away; H = Home; W = Win; D = Draw; L = Loss

== Season diary ==
=== July ===
A busy pre-season fixture list saw Torquay take on a wide variety of teams and, apart from a 3–1 defeat to Championship side QPR (now with ex-Gulls manager Neil Warnock in charge), Torquay managed to win all of their other pre-season matches. These included encouraging displays against another Championship side Bristol City as well as defeats of local rivals Plymouth Argyle and Yeovil Town, both of League One. Among the close season signings, perhaps the most impressive was the ex-Leicester City forward Billy Kee. The young striker scored a total of nine pre-season goals, including a hat trick against Weymouth on his debut and an astonishing four first half goals against Tiverton Town.

Of the trialists on show during these games, midfielder Damon Lathrope (formerly of Norwich City) caught the eye of manager Paul Buckle and was offered a two-year deal. Meanwhile, a familiar face returned to Plainmoor in the form of striker Martin Gritton, who had enjoyed a successful spell with the Gulls between 2002 and 2004. Although still under contract to League Two rivals Chesterfield, Gritton was allowed to join Torquay on loan until January 2011. Another (more recent) fan favourite, Guy Branston also re-joined the Gulls, with the combative defender agreeing a permanent one-year deal having been on loan from Burton Albion for the latter half of the 2009–10 season. However, another Plainmoor hero, Wayne Carlisle, was deemed a free agent after the winger failed to agree a new contract due, in part, to his ongoing struggle with injury.

=== August ===
Having finished last season with a club record of 691 minutes without conceding a goal, Torquay were keen to begin the new season in a similar fashion. The Gulls got off to a perfect start in their season opener with a 3–0 win against Northampton at Plainmoor, a win which put the Devon side at the top of the new League Two table. After consecutive 2–0 victories against Lincoln and Bradford, Torquay went into their match away to Port Vale aiming to become only the fourth team in Football League history to post eleven consecutive clean sheets. Unfortunately, Port Vale managed to breach the Torquay defence in the first half, although the Gulls still went on to win the game 2–1. Nevertheless, a new club record of 998 minutes without conceding a goal had been set, and victories in the first four games had ensured the best start to a season in Torquay's history. Those wins made sure that the Gulls spent the whole of August at the top of the League Two table.

With the news that Wayne Carlisle had agreed to rejoin the Gulls, Torquay went into their Carling Cup First Round fixture against Reading full of confidence. The Torquay defence proved as resilient against the Championship side as it had been against every other team it had encountered since the beginning of April, and it was not until the very last minute of extra time that Royals striker Grzegorz Rasiak finally found a way past keeper Scott Bevan. A similar problem was encountered by Bournemouth in their Johnstone Paints Trophy First Round clash with the Gulls. However, this time, with the match going straight to penalties with a 0–0 stalemate after 90 minutes, the Cherries still could not find a way past Bevan and Torquay went on to win the tie 3–0 in the penalty shoot out.

With the side currently enjoying so much success, it was perhaps no surprise that other clubs began to take an interest in the Torquay players. After turning down an offer from an unnamed League One side for defender Mark Ellis, manager Paul Buckle was relieved to reach the end of the summer transfer window without losing any of his squad.

=== September ===
In recognition of Torquay's impressive start to the season, Paul Buckle was named League Two Manager of the Month for August. However, after a near perfect August, September was to prove something of a reality check for the Gulls. With Torquay's clean sheet record ending against Port Vale in their previous match, a 2–1 defeat away to Southend in their first game of the month put to an end a twelve match unbeaten run in the League which had stretched back to March. This was then followed up by two successive 0–0 draws at home to Accrington Stanley and away to Stevenage. Although these results seemed to suggest the Gulls had got their defensive house back in the order, they were now struggling to find the back of the net. With summer signings Billy Kee and Martin Gritton yet to register on the goalscorer charts, and Elliot Benyon out injured for the Accrington game and on the bench for most of the Stevenage match, the Gulls were starting to look a little light up front, despite the best efforts of the versatile Chris Zebroski who was being employed as both winger and striker.

One new face who appeared during the month was full back Danny Senda. The ex-Millwall and Wycombe defender had impressed Paul Buckle after recently playing in reserve team games against Exeter City and Forest Green. Unfortunately, his debut match, at home to Macclesfield, coincided with a further downturn in the Gulls fortunes when they were beaten 3–1. A chance to make amends came three days later with another home match, this time against former Conference rivals Aldershot. However, with midfielder Damon Lathrope leaving the field injured after only 14 minutes on his first League start, Torquay could not find a way past a resolute Shots defence and were eventually sunk by a Marvin Morgan goal in the 86th minute.

With just 2 points taken from a possible 15, Torquay were fortunate to still find themselves in the play-off positions at the end of September having begun the month at the top of the table.

=== October ===
After being informed by chairman Simon Baker that the club's playing budget had been cut, Paul Buckle now found his options limited as he attempted to revive Torquay's flagging league campaign. In his efforts to "shuffle the pack", Buckle would now have to delve into the loan market and also make some tough decisions with the current squad members. Most significantly, after first being dropped for September's match against Aldershot and then again for the trip to Crewe Alexandra, club captain Nicky Wroe was placed on the transfer list. It was also made known that the club would be open to offers for defender Kieran Charnock who had struggled to break up the central defensive partnership forged by Mark Ellis and Guy Branston.

With Wroe and Charnock on the transfer list, new faces began to appear with the aim of freshening up the side. First through the door was Joe Oastler on loan from Queens Park Rangers. Capable of playing as both a midfielder and defender, Oastler joined Torquay on a one-month deal. Later in the month, two more loan signings arrived at Plainmoor within twenty four hours of each other. Winger Romone Rose became the second loanee from Neil Warnock's QPR, signing a three-month deal, while the young Wolves striker Ashley Hemmings joined Torquay, like Oastler, on a one-month contract.

On the pitch, Torquay struggled to get back to the early season form which saw them spend the whole of August at the top of the League Two table. Although a creditable 1–1 draw away to in-form Shrewsbury Town seemed to point to an improvement in the team's performances, the Gulls were then to crash out three days later to Swindon Town in the Second Round of the Johnstone Paints Trophy (although, the fact that several of Torquay's first choice regulars were rested for the match indicated that the League Trophy was not high on Paul Buckle's list of priorities). Astonishingly, Torquay then managed to scrape only a 3–3 draw away to Crewe and then lose 4–3 at home to Bury, despite going 2–0 ahead in both matches. However, a corner of sorts appeared to have been turned in their match away to Gillingham when, at 1–0 down with 94 minutes of the match played and with newly installed club captain Lee Mansell sent off four minutes previously, a Kevin Nicholson free kick somehow managed to sneak past Gills keeper Alan Julian and salvage a 1–1 draw with the final kick of the game. The Gulls took their good fortune with them into their final game of the month at home to Morecambe, where they ran out 3–1 winners and achieved only their first victory in ten league games. With an upturn in their on-field performances, Torquay were now able to look forward to November with renewed optimism.

=== November ===
The revival which seemed to have been sparked by Kevin Nicholson's last gasp equaliser at Gillingham began to gather momentum during November. In contrast to the previous season, the Gulls were quickly developing into a formidable outfit on the road and this proved crucial during a month in which three of Torquay's four League Two fixtures were away from Plainmoor. After a convincing 2–0 victory over former Conference rivals Oxford United, the Gulls were disappointed to only pick up one point in a 1–1 draw away to Stockport. However, the performance of the month was probably the impressive 3–1 win over promotion-chasing Wycombe Wanderers at Adams Park, a result which saw Torquay move above the Chairboys into sixth place in the League Two table. Conversely, the only home league fixture of the month resulted in a lacklustre 1–1 draw with relegation-threatened Barnet.

As per tradition, November saw the entry into the FA Cup of the League One and Two teams. The first two rounds were played during this month and Torquay found themselves involved in both after first easing past Conference side Mansfield Town and then seeing off Walsall of League One. The two 1–0 victories ensured the Gulls participation in the Third Round for the fifth time in six seasons. The Third Round draw saw Torquay receive a home fixture against another League One side Carlisle United. While possibly not the money-spinning draw that either team was hoping for, it was at least a game which, on recent form, gave the Gulls a very realistic chance of progressing to the FA Cup fourth round.

No new additions were made to the squad during the month, although the loan deal for Joe Oastler was extended until January while Wolves agreed to allow Ashley Hemmings to extend his stay at Plainmoor. With the loan window about to close, leading striker Elliot Benyon appeared to be on the verge of leaving Torquay, with Swindon, Dagenham & Redbridge and Southend among the clubs reported to have been interested in making a move for the young forward. However, Gulls fans were relieved when the window closed with Benyon still part of the United squad – at least until the January transfer window. Of the two players placed on the transfer list in October, Kieran Charnock moved on loan to Morecambe, with a view to making the deal a permanent one in January. However, former captain Nicky Wroe now seemed happy to remain at Plainmoor after Paul Buckle revealed the midfielder had rejected a move to Aldershot.

In recognition of the Gulls remaining unbeaten in all competitions throughout November, Paul Buckle was once again short listed for the League Two Manager of the Month award.

=== December ===
With November's League Two Manager of the Month award going to Port Vale's Micky Adams, Gulls fans would have been relieved to have avoided the 'curse' often associated with the award, and which certainly appeared to affect Torquay's form after Paul Buckle won the award for August. However, the December curse seemed to have been applied to the entire Football League, with a large number of matches being postponed due to the freezing weather conditions which hit the UK throughout most of the month. As a result, the Gulls only managed to fulfil one of five fixtures scheduled for the final month of 2010, that being a disappointing 1–0 defeat away to league leaders Chesterfield.

Off the field, December saw the departure of two players. Danny Senda left the Gulls after making only three appearances since joining in September, while Wayne Carlisle was released after making 76 appearances for Torquay and being a key member of the squad which gained promotion from the Conference. Of the recent loan signings, Romone Rose was allowed to return to QPR while Ashley Hemmings had his loan deal from Wolves extended until the end of the season.

There was a sense that Paul Buckle was clearing the decks in time for the January transfer window. However, whether he himself would still be at Torquay by the end of January was in serious doubt as he was being heavily tipped to take over from the recently sacked Paul Trollope at League One side Bristol Rovers.

=== January ===
Another year, another transfer window and another FA Cup run for Torquay United. Despite being the favourite with many bookmakers to take over at Bristol Rovers, Paul Buckle was left to focus on his job at Plainmoor after Dave Penney was installed as the new manager at the Memorial Stadium. As is often the case, most of the transfer activity was left until the last day of January, although two predictable changes did take place early in the month with Kieran Charnock making his loan move to Morecambe a permanent one and Martin Gritton returning to parent club Chesterfield after the striker had failed to make an impression during his second spell at the club. Meanwhile, Joe Oastler had his loan from QPR extended until the end of the season.

With weather conditions more favourable than they had been throughout December, Torquay were keen to get themselves back into contention for a play-off spot. However, two draws, two defeats and only one win saw the side slip from 7th position at the end of 2010 to a disappointing 13th place in the League Two table by the end of January. With their clean sheet record of earlier in the season a dim and distant memory, the Gulls were now too often succumbing to late goals with a total of seven points being dropped in the dying moments of the games against Oxford, Morecambe and Gillingham. An encouraging display of the month was reserved for the fewer than 2,000 spectators who turned out at Plainmoor for the 2–1 win over in-form Crewe Alexandra with Torquay claiming their first home victory in the league since October.

Despite their indifferent league form, the FA Cup was once again providing a welcome distraction with Torquay being involved in the Third Round for the third consecutive season. One goal from Eunan O'Kane was to prove enough to edge past Carlisle in this season's Third Round tie and anticipation was high yet again for the following day's fourth-round draw. Unfortunately, despite being the first ball pulled out of the drum, the Gulls yet again missed out on the chance of meeting one of the so-called "big boys", instead having to entertain the winners of the yet to be played match between Crawley Town (the only non-league team left in the competition) and Derby County of the Championship. After having beaten League One side Swindon in the Second Round, Crawley pulled off another shock win over the Rams to set up a reunion of the two former Conference rivals. Although, many Gulls fans were disappointed by the draw, there was now a fantastic opportunity for Torquay to reach the fifth round of the FA Cup for the first time in the club's history.

With over 5,000 supporters struggling to get through the Plainmoor turnstiles for the match with Crawley, there was a fifteen-minute delay to the kick off to what turned out to be an ill-tempered Fourth round tie. Torquay found it hard to get a foothold in the first half of the game and eventually fell behind in the 39th minute to a Matt Tubbs strike. However, worse was to follow in the second period when Chris Zebroski was sent off in the 61st minute for a second bookable offence after a handball in the six yard box. However, when keeper Scott Bevan managed to save the resulting penalty from Tubbs, the Gulls spirits were raised again until another penalty was awarded to Crawley just minutes later. Astonishingly, Bevan pulled off his second penalty save of the match, this time from Craig McAllister, to give Torquay another lifeline. Unfortunately, they were unable to capitalise on Bevan's heroics and, despite the sending off of Dean Howell for Crawley in the 83rd minute, the score remained 1–0 until the final whistle. In a match which saw seven bookings in addition to the two dismissals, many Torquay supporters were angered by the tactics employed by Crawley manager Steve Evans (two of Crawley's yellow cards were for time wasting) and their misery was compounded the following day when Evans’ men were rewarded with a trip to Old Trafford to play Manchester United in the fifth-round draw.

Just two days after the huge disappointment of the Crawley game, the last day of the January transfer window finally saw the departure of top striker Elliot Benyon to Swindon. Benyon had been one of Paul Buckle's first signings when he took over at Plainmoor in 2007, and had now developed into Torquay's main goal threat. As such he had been tracked by several clubs over a number of months and his eventual move had been seen as inevitable by the majority of Gulls fans. The last day of the window also saw the transfer of Nicky Wroe to Shrewsbury and the cancellation of Ashley Hemmings’ loan deal with Wolves. In their place came striker Jake Robinson and midfielder Craig Stanley on loan deals from Shrewsbury and Morecambe respectively. With a new-look squad and just the league to concentrate on, Torquay had to now put an ultimately disheartening month behind them and look to the future.

=== February ===
When new loan signing Jake Robinson scored after ten minutes of his debut against Hereford on the first day of the month, Torquay United looked set to put the misery of their FA Cup exit behind them. However, even before the game had reached half time, it was made known to Paul Buckle that Robinson's registration had not been completed before the required deadline and was actually ineligible to play in the fixture. With the possibility of any points won from the match being deducted by the FA, Buckle was unable to prevent the demoralised Gulls from slipping to a 3–1 defeat. Incredibly, it emerged days later that Hereford had also fielded an ineligible player in the same game, with midfielder Rob Purdie’s registration also not being completed in time for the match.

With Torquay now having to wait for a decision on any punishment from the FA, the club had to make the most of a busy February schedule which included a further six League Two encounters following the disastrous Hereford game. The first three were against teams battling relegation and the Gulls took full advantage, grabbing maximum points against struggling Stockport, Barnet and Burton Albion. These matches saw Paul Buckle begin to experiment with his squad selection with second choice keeper Danny Potter being brought in to give Scott Bevan a well-deserved break and left back Lathaniel Rowe-Turner deputising for the ever-present Kevin Nicholson. Both players rewarded the manager's faith with Potter keeping clean sheets in his first three games and Rowe-Turner scoring on his first league start of the season against Barnet. With loan players Jake Robinson and Craig Stanley fitting seamlessly into the new-look squad, Torquay were further enhanced by another loan signing in Northampton midfielder Ryan Gilligan.

Although the next three matches against Southend, Cheltenham and Accrington Stanley only secured a total of two points, the Gulls could be relatively satisfied with the returns of a busy month which left them just four points outside of the play-offs and with games in hand on most of the teams around them.

=== March ===
In a month with a punishing eight matches to be played, Torquay had to be at full strength if they were to make any kind of push for promotion. With that in mind, Paul Buckle once again dipped into the loan market. Although current loanee Ryan Gilligan unfortunately had to make an early return to Northampton following a family bereavement, Buckle was able to make an immediate replacement in the form of young Derby midfielder Ben Pringle. Shortly afterwards, Plainmoor also saw the arrival of two loan strikers in Ronan Murray from Ipswich Town and Gavin Tomlin of Dagenham & Redbridge. With Buckle eventually negotiating for both forwards to remain with Torquay until the end of the season, the Gulls now had a variety of attacking options with the likes of Jake Robinson, Chris Zebroski, Eunan O’Kane and Billy Kee already causing problems to opposition defences.

Gavin Tomlin was to make an instant impact, scoring just five minutes into his debut in the home match against Shrewsbury. It was a game in which the Gulls went on to win 5–0, a particularly impressive performance considering the Shrews were currently 4th in the table and had spent the majority of the season in the play-off positions. Even that result was arguably bettered by Torquay's trip to Gigg Lane three days later where they beat 2nd placed Bury 2–1 after coming back from a goal down. Earlier in the month, Torquay had already claimed four points from two other play-off challengers, grabbing a 1–1 draw with Rotherham and a 2–0 victory against Stevenage. In fact, Torquay seemed to be experiencing more problems against teams lower down in the division; the only defeat of the month came away to Aldershot and the Gulls only just managed to sneak a point with a 91st minute Guy Branston header to secure a 3–3 draw away at Macclesfield.

Shortly before the home game against Cheltenham, Ben Pringle had made it known to Paul Buckle that he wanted to go back to Derby to fight for a first team place there. Despite some encouraging performances during his short spell at Plainmoor, Buckle allowed the midfielder to make an immediate return to the Championship club. That match against Cheltenham resulted in a relatively comfortable three points for Torquay and the Gulls went into their final fixture of the month, a Friday night trip to Northampton, full of confidence. However, traffic problems on the M5 motorway resulted in the team arriving two hours late at the Sixfields Stadium. Even with the kick off being delayed by half an hour, the Gulls had little time to prepare for the match once they had arrived. Nevertheless, with the score at 1–1 going into injury time, Billy Kee seemed to have snatched a late win for Torquay with a stunning strike in the 92nd minute. However, a controversial 96th minute free kick for the Cobblers resulted in a goal from Guillem Bauzà and the Gulls had to settle for a 2–2 draw.

That draw left Torquay in 4th place in the League Two table, although with most other teams playing on the following day and a few more midweek matches at the end of the month, the Gulls eventually ended March in 8th position, one point outside the play-off zone and just four points away from automatic promotion with seven games left to play. With four of those matches against teams in or around the play-offs, Torquay Utd went into April with their destiny very much in their own hands.

=== April ===
The saga regarding the fielding of the unregistered Jake Robinson in the February match against Hereford was finally resolved with Torquay receiving a one-point deduction and a £10,000 fine. With Hereford playing the equally ineligible Rob Purdie in the same match, they were also fined £10,000 and deducted the three points they had gained from the match. While it could be argued that, having lost a point they had never gained in the first place, the Gulls were more harshly treated than the Bulls, Torquay decided not to appeal against the Football League's ruling.

All of the off-field politics meant that Torquay had to make the most of their remaining games in order to make a push for promotion to League One. The month got off to a great start with a 2–0 home win against Lincoln, followed up by an impressive 3–0 away victory over sleeping giants Bradford City. However, despite having not participated in a goalless draw since September's trip to Stevenage, the Gulls managed to produce two consecutive 0–0 results at home against Port Vale and Wycombe. The latter game was particularly frustrating for Torquay as only some wayward finishing and the heroics of Wycombe keeper Nikki Bull kept the Gulls from gaining all three points. That match effectively ended Torquay's hopes of clinching an automatic promotion place and was also Ronan Murray's final game for the club as he was recalled by Ipswich a few days later.

Easter Monday's trip to Burton saw Torquay find their shooting boots again with Chris Zebroski and Gavin Tomlin putting the Gulls 2–0 up within the first 15 minutes. However, not for the first time this season, Torquay managed to surrender a two-goal lead and had to rely on a stunning 78th-minute strike from Billy Kee to rescue a point in a thrilling 3–3 draw. This was a result which left Torquay just outside the play-offs with two games remaining. The penultimate game of the league campaign was a Friday night encounter at home to champions-elect Chesterfield. Over 5,000 supporters witnessed yet another 0–0 draw which was also Craig Stanley's last game before having to return to parent club Morecambe. Stanley was perhaps one of Paul Buckle's most successful loan signings and many Gulls fans were hopeful that the midfielder would make a return to Plainmoor next season. The significance of the Chesterfield draw was only fully felt the following day with Gillingham and Stevenage both losing their matches. This meant all three teams would go into the final day of the season tied on 68 points with just two play-off spots remaining, although Torquay's superior goal difference left them in pole position. The Gulls now had to travel to Rotherham knowing they only had to equal or better the Gillingham and Stevenage results in order to guarantee a place in the play-offs.

As had so often been the case throughout the years, Torquay's destiny would ultimately be decided on the final day of the season.

=== May ===
As the last day of the regular season arrived, and with Torquay, Stevenage and Gillingham separated only by goal difference, it was vital for the Gulls to do everything they could in their match with Rotherham to ensure they secured one of the two remaining play-off berths. However, it was to prove a challenging afternoon at the Don Valley Stadium. Nerves began to jangle as soon as Ryan Taylor put the Millers 1–0 ahead after just ten minutes and, despite Chris Zebroski equalising in the 31st minute, Rotherham restored their lead just two minutes later thanks to a Danny Harrison strike. Meanwhile, with goals going in at the Stevenage and Gillingham games, Torquay found themselves in 6th, 7th and 8th position at various times during the afternoon and, when Oliver Banks put Rotherham 3–1 ahead in the 80th minute, they were now relying on scores from elsewhere if they were to book a place in the play-offs. While Stevenage secured their place with an enthralling 3–3 draw against Bury, the Gulls were ultimately indebted to Chesterfield who, by beating Gillingham 3–1, not only clinched the League Two title for themselves, but also made sure that Torquay would finish the season in the final play-off spot, ahead of the unfortunate Gills on goal difference alone.

Torquay's play-off semi-final opponents turned out to be Shrewsbury who missed out on automatic promotion by just one point. With the first leg at Plainmoor in front of the Sky Sports cameras, the Shrews were no doubt mindful of the 5–0 thrashing they had received at the Gulls’ home ground just two months previously. The fact that two of those goals came from Jake Robinson (on loan from Shrewsbury) added extra spice to the tie, particularly as there was no clause preventing Robinson from playing against his parent club in the play-offs. Despite Robinson not getting on the score sheet, Torquay produced an assured performance which saw them comfortably win the first leg 2–0 thanks to goals from Chris Zebroski and Eunan O’Kane. The Gulls had to make sure they finished off the job in the return leg and that is exactly what they did with a 0–0 draw at the New Meadow. The draw meant that Torquay United had done enough to ensure their place in the play-off final where the opponents would be their old Conference rivals Stevenage, who secured their own spot thanks to a 3–0 aggregate win over Accrington Stanley.

With the Champions League Final scheduled to take place at Wembley Stadium on the same weekend as the League play-off finals, Torquay instead had to make the trip to Old Trafford for their showdown with Stevenage. The omens were not good for the Gulls when it was announced that the referee for the final would be Darren Deadman. This was the same man who had overseen the disastrous FA Cup fourth-round match with Crawley Town, the team who, ironically, had prevented Torquay from making an earlier trip to Old Trafford. Like the Crawley match, the kick off was delayed by fifteen minutes (due to traffic congestion on the M6 motorway) and like the Crawley match, Torquay fell behind to a goal late in the first half, this time a 41st-minute strike from Stevenage midfielder John Mousinho. And just like the Crawley match, the Gulls failed to find a reply which meant that Mousinho's goal was enough to see the Hertfordshire side promoted to League One while ensuring Torquay would remain in League Two for another season.

Two days after the play-off defeat, it was announced, following much speculation, that Paul Buckle would be leaving Torquay after four seasons to become the new manager of Bristol Rovers. It was a position he had been linked with since the previous December after the sacking of Paul Trollope and, when his successor Dave Penney was also sacked after just two months, there was a certain inevitability to Buckle's eventual move to the Memorial Stadium. With Buckle also taking first team coach Shaun North with him to Rovers, there was a huge rebuilding job to be done at Plainmoor. With uncertainty hanging over those players whose contracts were soon to expire as well as the loan players which had performed admirably over the final few months of the season, it looked like the end of an era for Torquay United and the beginning of a new one.

=== June ===
With the original shortlist of candidates containing names such as Paul Trollope and former Torquay favourites Alex Russell and Chris Hargreaves, speculation was growing amongst Gulls fans as to who would replace Paul Buckle. One name which had not been mentioned in the local press was Martin Ling, so it was something of a surprise when the former Leyton Orient and Cambridge United boss was announced as the new man in charge at Plainmoor.

Top of Ling's list of priorities was to start building a new team. With players reaching the end of their contracts and loan players returning to their parent clubs, the squad was now starting to look rather threadbare. Several key players who had got Torquay to the play-off final would definitely not be at the club for the new season. Player of the year, Guy Branston made a move to Bradford City while Scott Bevan decided to join Paul Buckle at Bristol Rovers. Torquay fans were also disappointed to see midfielder Craig Stanley, who had been particularly impressive for the Gulls on his loan spell from Morecambe, also follow Buckle to the Memorial Stadium. Meanwhile, another loan player who would not be returning to Plainmoor was Jake Robinson who agreed to join Northampton Town instead.

The first new face at Plainmoor was Shaun Taylor, who was appointed as Ling's assistant manager. Taylor was previously the youth coach at Exeter City and was also brother to former Torquay defender Craig Taylor. With Taylor on board, Ling now looked to bring new players to Torquay. Firstly, Joe Oastler signed a permanent two-year deal with Torquay after being released by QPR, while Danny Stevens also agreed in principle to renew his contract. Another familiar face who returned to Torquay was Chris McPhee. He had played for the Gulls during their disastrous 2006–07 season and was looking to make amends on his return to the club. Joining on the same day as McPhee was Daniel Leadbitter, a promising young defender who had just been released by Newcastle United.

While the new signings did much to assure Torquay's fans, more disappointment came with the news that top goalscorer Chris Zebroski had handed in a transfer request. With still no goalkeeper and pre-season friendlies just around the corner, it was clear that Martin Ling and Torquay United still had much work to do before the arrival of the new season.

== Results ==
=== League Two ===
7 Aug 2010	Torquay United	3–0	Northampton Town	Plainmoor
15:00 BST	Robertson (yellow card) 28'; Nicholson 44'; Zebroski 47'; Benyon 50'	Report		Attendance: 3,567; Referee: Oliver Langford

14 Aug 2010	Lincoln City	0–2	Torquay United	Sincil Bank
15:00 BST		Report	Benyon 26' 71'	Attendance: 3,033; Referee: Michael Naylor

21 Aug 2010	Torquay United	2–0	Bradford City	Plainmoor
15:00 BST	Stevens 2'; Zebroski 66'; Branston (yellow card) 72'; Wroe (yellow card) 74'; Mansell (yellow card) 80'	Report	Threlfall (red card) 12'; Doherty (yellow card) 42'	Attendance: 2,941; Referee: Steve Tanner

28 Aug 2010	Port Vale	1–2	Torquay United	Vale Park
15:00 BST	Tomlinson (yellow card) 5'; Griffith 37'; Collins (yellow card) 70'; Roberts (yellow card) 83'	Report	Wroe 5' (pen.) (yellow card) 77'; Nicholson (yellow card) 21'; Zebroski 28'; Benyon (yellow card) 68'; Mansell (yellow card) 90'	Attendance: 5,750; Referee: Geoff Eltringham

4 Sep 2010	Southend United	2–1	Torquay United	Roots Hall
15:00 BST	Grant 15'; Simpson 43'	Report	Zebroski (yellow card) 62' (goal) 78'; Mansell (yellow card) 90'	Attendance: 5,505; Referee: Dean Whitestone

11 Sep 2010	Torquay United	0–0	Accrington Stanley	Plainmoor
15:00 BST		Report	Edwards (yellow card) 83'; McConville (yellow card) 84'; Ryan (yellow card) 90'	Attendance: 2,598; Referee: Simon Hooper

18 Sep 2010	Stevenage	0–0	Torquay United	Broadhall Way
15:00 BST	Mousinho (yellow card) 29'; Roberts (yellow card) 53'	Report	Mansell (yellow card) 6'; Ellis (yellow card) 29'; Branston (yellow card) 42'; Stevens (yellow card) 64'	Attendance: 3,049; Referee: David Coote

25 Sep 2010	Torquay United	1–3	Macclesfield Town	Plainmoor
15:00 BST	Benyon 40' (yellow card) 86'	Report	Bencherif 12'; Draper 76'; Sinclair 78'	Attendance: 2,551; Referee: Gary Sutton

28 Sep 2010	Torquay United	0–1	Aldershot Town	Plainmoor
19:45 BST	Robertson (yellow card) 35'	Report	Morgan 86'	Attendance: 2,167; Referee: Roger East

2 Oct 2010	Shrewsbury Town	1–1	Torquay United	New Meadow
15:00 BST	Robinson 5' (yellow card) 6'; Neal (yellow card) 22'	Report	Benyon 34' (pen.) (yellow card) 69'; Robertson (yellow card) 69'; Zebroski (yellow card) 83'	Attendance: 6,034; Referee: Chris Sarginson

9 Oct 2010	Crewe Alexandra	3–3	Torquay United	Alexandra Stadium
15:00 BST	Donaldson 45+2'; Bell (yellow card) 66'; Westwood 73' 78' (pen.)	Report	Ellis 8' 16'; O'Kane (yellow card) 63' (goal) 67'; Branston (yellow card) 77'	Attendance: 4,445; Referee: Russell Booth

16 Oct 2010	Torquay United	3–4	Bury	Plainmoor
15:00 BST	Robertson 18'; Zebroski 20' 56'; Benyon (yellow card) 87'	Report	Lowe 27' (pen.); Sodje (yellow card) 31'; Ajose 33'; Schumacher 51'; Jones 71'; Lees (yellow card) 78'	Attendance: 2,553; Referee: Iain Williamson

23 Oct 2010	Gillingham	1–1	Torquay United	Priestfield Stadium
15:00 BST	McDonald 80'	Report	Oastler (yellow card) 70'; Robertson (yellow card) 84'; Kee (yellow card) 86'; Mansell (yellow card) 90' (yellow-red card) 90+2'; Nicholson 90+5'	Attendance: 5,345; Referee: Pat Miller

30 Oct 2010	Torquay United	3–1	Morecambe	Plainmoor
15:00 BST	Benyon 11' 75'; Rose 69'; Zebroski (yellow card) 84'	Report	Parrish (red card) 9'; McCready 30'; Shuker (red card) 82'	Attendance: 2,172; Referee: Phil Gibbs

2 Nov 2010	Oxford United	0–2	Torquay United	Kassam Stadium
19:45 GMT		Report	Batt 5' (o.g.); Macklin (red card) 17'; Kee 89'	Attendance: 6,401; Referee: Darren Sheldrake

13 Nov 2010	Torquay United	1–1	Barnet	Plainmoor
15:00 GMT	Benyon 11'; O'Kane (yellow card) 37'; Gritton (yellow card) 78'; Nicholson (yellow card) 87'	Report	Uddin (yellow card) 8'; Byrne 20'; Marshall (yellow card) 59'; Parkes (yellow card) 82'	Attendance: 2,257; Referee: Keith Stroud

20 Nov 2010	Stockport County	1–1	Torquay United	Edgeley Park
15:00 GMT	Tansey 75'	Report	Oastler (yellow card) 35'; O'Kane 61'; Rose (yellow card) 87'	Attendance: 3,772; Referee: Gary Sutton

23 Nov 2010	Wycombe Wanderers	1–3	Torquay United	Adams Park
19:45 GMT	Beavon 7'; Winfield (yellow card) 68'; Lewis (yellow card) 76'	Report	Wroe 27' 49'; Branston (yellow card) 61'; Benyon 88'; Oastler (yellow card) 90+3'	Attendance: 2,273; Referee: Gavin Ward

11 Dec 2010	Chesterfield	1–0	Torquay United	B2net Stadium
15:00 GMT	Lester 28'	Report		Attendance: 4,801; Referee: Jonathan Moss

1 Jan 2011	Hereford United	2–2	Torquay United	Edgar Street
15:00 GMT	Fleetwood 32'; Manset 66'; Heath (yellow card) 78'; Townsend (yellow card) 89'	Report	O'Kane 25'; Benyon 45'	Attendance: 2,373; Referee: Steve Rushton

3 Jan 2011	Torquay United	3–4	Oxford United	Plainmoor
15:00 GMT	Benyon 43' 73'; Zebroski (yellow card) 66'; Kee 79'; Ellis (yellow card) 86'	Report	Hall (yellow card) 9'; Craddock 35'; Midson 42' 64' 90+1'; McLaren (yellow card) 50'	Attendance: 3,021; Referee: Roger East

11 Jan 2011	Torquay United	2–1	Crewe Alexandra	Plainmoor
19:45 GMT	O'Kane 7'; Zebroski 16'; Ellis (yellow card) 58'	Report	Ada (yellow card) 33'; Miller (yellow card) 53'; Shelley 59'	Attendance: 1,955; Referee: James Linington

15 Jan 2011	Morecambe	2–1	Torquay United	Globe Arena
15:00 GMT	Wilson 87' (pen.) 90+2' (pen.)	Report	Robertson (yellow card) 32'; Kee 78'	Attendance: 1,643; Referee: Andy Woolmer

22 Jan 2011	Torquay United	1–1	Gillingham	Plainmoor
15:00 GMT	Benyon 6'	Report	Rooney 87'	Attendance: 2,368; Referee: Graham Scott

1 Feb 2011	Torquay United	1–3	Hereford United	Plainmoor
19:45 GMT	Robinson 10'; Lathrope (yellow card) 78'	Report	Fleetwood 14' 46'; Townsend (yellow card) 72'; Featherstone 80'	Attendance: 1,680; Referee: Brendan Malone

5 Feb 2011	Torquay United	2–0	Stockport County	Plainmoor
15:00 GMT	Zebroski 13'; Kee 73'	Report		Attendance: 1,954; Referee: Simon Hooper

12 Feb 2011	Barnet	0–3	Torquay United	Underhill Stadium
15:00 GMT	Pulis (red card) 29'; Fraser (yellow card) 29'; Parkes (yellow card) 39'; McLeod (yellow card) 70'	Report	Rowe-Turner 25'; Stanley (yellow card) 53'; Kee 75'; Zebroski 90'	Attendance: 2,168; Referee: Peter Quinn

15 Feb 2011	Torquay United	1–0	Burton Albion	Plainmoor
19:45 GMT	Robertson 56'	Report		Attendance: 1,602; Referee: Karl Evans

19 Feb 2011	Torquay United	1–1	Southend United	Plainmoor
15:00 GMT	Oastler (yellow card) 34'; Branston (yellow card) 37'; Kee 73'	Report	Gilbert (yellow card) 12'; Corr 81'	Attendance: 2,880; Referee: David Coote

22 Feb 2011	Cheltenham Town	2–2	Torquay United	Whaddon Road
19:45 GMT	Goulding 79'; Thomas 90+4'	Report	Robinson 14' (yellow card) 50'; Zebroski (yellow card) 31'; O'Kane (yellow card) 63'; Stevens 65'; Oastler (yellow card) 79'	Attendance: 2,977; Referee: Anthony Bates

26 Feb 2011	Accrington Stanley	1–0	Torquay United	Crown Ground
15:00 GMT	Joyce (yellow card) 42'; Craney 78'	Report	Ellis (red card) 45'	Attendance: 1,543; Referee: Mick Russell

1 Mar 2011	Torquay United	1–1	Rotherham United	Plainmoor
19:45 GMT	O'Kane 17'; Robertson (yellow card) 60'; Branston (yellow card) 82'; Stevens (yellow card) 90+2'	Report	Taylor 73'	Attendance: 1,514; Referee: Trevor Kettle

5 Mar 2011	Torquay United	2–0	Stevenage	Plainmoor
15:00 GMT	Zebroski (yellow card) 16'; Stevens 46'; Robinson 85'	Report	Roberts (red card) 68'; Laird (yellow card) 90+3'	Attendance: 2,197; Referee: Bobby Madley

8 Mar 2011	Aldershot Town	1–0	Torquay United	Recreation Ground
19:45 GMT	Guttridge 53'; Mekki (yellow card) 85'	Report	Zebroski (yellow card) 26'; Halpin (yellow card) 77'	Attendance: 1,939; Referee: Carl Berry

12 Mar 2011	Torquay United	5–0	Shrewsbury Town	Plainmoor
15:00 GMT	Tomlin 5'; Robinson 54' (pen.) 56'; Zebroski 70'; Sharps 85' (o.g.)	Report	Grandison (red card) 42'; Cansdell-Sherriff (yellow card) 87'	Attendance: 2,861; Referee: Andy D'Urso

15 Mar 2011	Bury	1–2	Torquay United	Gigg Lane
19:45 GMT	Holroyd 4'	Report	Stanley 61'; Zebroski 70'	Attendance: 2,747; Referee: Mike Dean

19 Mar 2011	Macclesfield Town	3–3	Torquay United	Moss Rose
15:00 GMT	Barnett 29'; Daniel 35'; Bencherif 57'; Wedgbury (yellow card) 89'	Report	Robinson 52' 74' (pen.); Stanley (yellow card) 78'; Branston 90+1'	Attendance: 1,556; Referee: Graham Salisbury

22 Mar 2011	Torquay United	2–1	Cheltenham Town	Plainmoor
19:45 GMT	Branston 28'; Murray 71'	Report	Andrew 89'	Attendance: 2,186; Referee: Steve Tanner

25 Mar 2011	Northampton Town	2–2	Torquay United	Sixfields Stadium
19:45 GMT	Johnson 30'; Bauzà 90+6'	Report	O'Kane 14' (yellow card) 37'; Branston (yellow card) 65'; Stanley (yellow card) 90'; Kee 90+2'	Attendance: 4,553; Referee: Chris Sarginson

2 Apr 2011	Torquay United	2–0	Lincoln City	Plainmoor
15:00 BST	Stanley (yellow card) 17'; Robertson (yellow card) 31'; Zebroski 74'; Tomlin 84'	Report	Kilbey (yellow card) 40'; Watts (yellow card) 55'; Fuseini (yellow card) 88'; O'Keefe (yellow card) 90'	Attendance: 2,751; Referee: Iain Williamson

9 Apr 2011	Bradford City	0–3	Torquay United	Valley Parade
15:00 BST		Report	Nicholson 31'; Tomlin 59'; Kee 78'	Attendance: 10,894; Referee: Pat Miller

16 Apr 2011	Torquay United	0–0	Port Vale	Plainmoor
15:00 BST	Zebroski (yellow card) 56'; Mansell (yellow card) 75'; Branston (yellow card) 90'	Report	Griffith (yellow card) 16'; Yates (yellow card) 71'; McCombe (yellow card) 78'	Attendance: 3,726; Referee: David Phillips

22 Apr 2011	Torquay United	0–0	Wycombe Wanderers	Plainmoor
15:00 BST	Stanley (yellow card) 71'	Report	Winfield (yellow card) 66'; Bloomfield (yellow card) 83'; Johnson (yellow card) 90'	Attendance: 4,009; Referee: Dean Whitestone

25 Apr 2011	Burton Albion	3–3	Torquay United	Pirelli Stadium
15:00 BST	McGrath 26'; Pearson 41' (yellow card) 59'; Zola 56'; Moore (yellow card) 90+1'	Report	Zebroski 10'; Tomlin 14'; Oastler (yellow card) 51'; Kee 78'; Branston (yellow card) 76'; Rowe-Turner (yellow card) 83'	Attendance: 3,280; Referee: David Webb

29 Apr 2011	Torquay United	0–0	Chesterfield	Plainmoor
19:45 BST		Report		Attendance: 5,002; Referee: David Coote

7 May 2011	Rotherham United	3–1	Torquay United	Don Valley Stadium
15:00 BST	Taylor 10'; Harrison 33'; Cresswell (yellow card) 47'; Banks 80'	Report	Oastler (yellow card) 17'; Zebroski 31'	Attendance: 3,379; Referee: Andy Woolmer

=== League Two play-offs ===
14 May 2011 Semi-final 1st Leg	Torquay United	2–0	Shrewsbury Town	Plainmoor
17:45 BST	Zebroski 29'; O'Kane 45+3'	Report		Attendance: 4,130; Referee: Scott Mathieson

20 May 2011 Semi-final 2nd Leg	Shrewsbury Town	0–0	Torquay United	New Meadow
19:45 BST	Sharps (yellow card) 28'	Report	Tomlin (yellow card) 29'; Lathrope (yellow card) 67'; Branston (yellow card) 86'	Attendance: 8,452; Referee: Kevin Wright

28 May 2011 Final	Stevenage	1–0	Torquay United	Old Trafford
15:00 BST	Mousinho 41' (yellow card) 59'; Harrison (yellow card) 90+4'	Report	Zebroski (yellow card) 55'; Oastler (yellow card) 80'	Attendance: 11,484; Referee: Darren Deadman

=== FA Cup ===
6 Nov 2010 First Round	Mansfield Town	0–1	Torquay United	Field Mill
15:00 GMT	Nix (yellow card) 23'; Cook (yellow card) 82'; Grand (yellow card) 90'	Report	Zebroski (yellow card) 28'; Benyon 87'	Attendance: 2,179; Referee: Michael Naylor

27 Nov 2010 Second Round	Torquay United	1–0	Walsall	Plainmoor
15:00 GMT	Kee 41' (pen.); Branston (yellow card) 90'	Report	Westlake (yellow card) 38'	Attendance: 2,334; Referee: Danny McDermid

8 Jan 2011 Third Round	Torquay United	1–0	Carlisle United	Plainmoor
15:00 GMT	O'Kane 6'; Wroe (yellow card) 28'; Branston (yellow card) 38'	Report	Taiwo (yellow card) 37'; Simek (yellow card) 45'	Attendance: 3,005; Referee: Phil Gibbs

29 Jan 2011 Fourth round	Torquay United	0–1	Crawley Town	Plainmoor
15:00 GMT	Zebroski (yellow card) 59' (yellow-red card) 61'; Ellis (yellow card) 59'; Kee (yellow card) 83'; Branston (yellow card) 86'	Report	Tubbs 39' (yellow card) 90+3'; McFadzean (yellow card) 42'; Howell (yellow card) 45' (yellow-red card) 83'; Kuipers (yellow card) 55'; Mills (yellow card) 71'	Attendance: 5,065; Referee: Darren Deadman

=== League Cup ===
11 Aug 2010 First Round	Torquay United	0–1 (a.e.t.)	Reading	Plainmoor
19:45 BST	Zebroski (yellow card) 70'; Benyon (yellow card) 115'	Report	Gunnarsson (yellow card) 114'; Rasiak 120+1'	Attendance: 2,832; Referee: Jonathan Moss

=== League Trophy ===
31 Aug 2010 First Round	Bournemouth	0–0 (0–3 p)	Torquay United	Dean Court
19:45 BST	Bradbury (yellow card) 90'	Report	Gritton (yellow card) 90'	Attendance: 3,140; Referee: Graham Scott
	Penalties
	Cummings (penalty missed); Bradbury (penalty missed); Pugh (penalty missed)		Robertson (penalty scored); Wroe (penalty scored); Nicholson (penalty scored)

5 Oct 2010 Second Round	Swindon Town	2–0	Torquay United	County Ground
19:00 BST	Ball 10'; Péricard 45+2'	Report	Charnock (yellow card) 43'	Attendance: 3,625; Referee: Fred Graham

=== Friendlies ===
10 Jul 2010	Weymouth	1–5	Torquay United	The Wessex Stadium
15:00 BST	Halloran 80'	Report	O'Kane 29'; Kee 57' 72' 83'; Benyon 76'	Attendance: 357; Referee: Mark Pottage

13 Jul 2010	Torquay United	3–1	Plymouth Argyle	Plainmoor
19:45 BST	Mackln 35'; Benyon 56'; Wroe 90' (pen.)	Report	Noone 1'	Attendance: 1,794; Referee: Brian Malone

14 Jul 2010	Bovey Tracey	0–6	Torquay United	Western Counties Roofing Ground
19:30 BST		Report	Yeoman; Charnock; Benyon; Kee (pen.); Stevens

16 Jul 2010	Torquay United	1–3	Queens Park Rangers	Plainmoor
19:30 BST	Robertson 60'	Report	Helguson 9'; Parker 72'; Ephraim 87'	Attendance: 1,429

19 Jul 2010	Tiverton Town	0–8	Torquay United	Ladysmead
19:00 BST		Report	Kee 7' 17' 18' 35'; Zebroski 24'; Yeoman 51'; Stevens 72'; Benyon 39'	Attendance: 280

21 Jul 2010	Torquay United	2–1	Bristol City	Plainmoor
19:45 BST	Mansell 63'; Ellis 75'	Report	Clarkson 55'	Attendance: 1,081

28 Jul 2010	Weston-super-Mare	0–3	Torquay United	Woodspring Stadium
19:45 BST		Report	Zebroski 31'; Benyon 63'; Gritton 75'

31 Jul 2010	Torquay United	1–0	Yeovil Town	Plainmoor
15:00 BST	Nicholson 48'	Report		Attendance: 914

=== Devon St Luke's Bowl ===
26 Jan 2011 Second Round	Tavistock	1–6	Torquay United	Langsford Park
	Goal		Yeoman; Palmer; Parish; Kudi	Referee: Adam Hopkins

2 Mar 2011 Quarter Final	Buckland Athletic	2–1	Torquay United	Homers Heath
19:15 GMT	(pen.)	Report	Halpin; Lathrope (red card)	Referee: Brett Huxtable

== Club statistics ==
=== First team appearances ===
No.	Pos	Nat	Player	Total		League Two ^{[1]}		FA Cup		League Cup		League Trophy	
No.	Pos	Nat	Player	Apps	Goals	Apps	Goals	Apps	Goals	Apps	Goals	Apps	Goals
1	GK	(England) ENG	Scott Bevan	46	0	40+0	0	4+0	0	1+0	0	1+0	0
2	DF	(England) ENG	Lathaniel Rowe-Turner	11	1	4+6	1	0+0	0	0+0	0	1+0	0
3	DF	(England) ENG	Kevin Nicholson	53	3	45+2	3	4+0	0	1+0	0	1+0	0
4	DF	(England) ENG	Mark Ellis	34	2	24+3	2	4+0	0	1+0	0	2+0	0
5	DF	(Scotland) SCO	Chris Robertson	53	2	43+3	2	3+1	0	1+0	0	2+0	0
6	DF	(England) ENG	Kieran Charnock	6	0	1+3	0	1+0	0	0+0	0	1+0	0
6	MF	(England) ENG	Craig Stanley	19	1	19+0	1	0+0	0	0+0	0	0+0	0
7	MF	(England) ENG	Lee Mansell	55	0	48+0	0	4+0	0	1+0	0	2+0	0
8	FW	(Northern Ireland) NIR	Billy Kee	50	10	20+23	9	1+3	1	1+0	0	1+1	0
9	FW	(England) ENG	Elliot Benyon	29	14	22+1	13	3+0	1	1+0	0	2+0	0
9	FW	(England) ENG	Jake Robinson	25	7	25+0	7	0+0	0	0+0	0	0+0	0
10	MF	(Northern Ireland) NIR	Eunan O'Kane	55	8	34+14	7	3+1	1	0+1	0	2+0	0
11	MF	(England) ENG	Nicky Wroe	27	3	20+0	3	4+0	0	1+0	0	2+0	0
11	MF	(England) ENG	Ryan Gilligan	5	0	0+5	0	0+0	0	0+0	0	0+0	0
11	FW	(Ireland) EIR	Ronan Murray	7	1	4+3	1	0+0	0	0+0	0	0+0	0
14	MF	(England) ENG	Lloyd Macklin	12	0	3+8	0	0+0	0	0+0	0	0+1	0
15	MF	(Northern Ireland) NIR	Wayne Carlisle	11	0	3+7	0	0+0	0	0+0	0	0+1	0
15	FW	(England) ENG	Gavin Tomlin	16	4	15+0	4	0+0	0	0+0	0	0+1	0
16	GK	(England) ENG	Danny Potter	10	0	9+0	0	0+0	0	0+0	0	1+0	0
17	MF	(England) ENG	Saul Halpin	5	0	0+4	0	0+1	0	0+0	0	0+0	0
18	DF	(England) ENG	Joe Oastler	31	0	17+11	0	2+1	0	0+0	0	0+0	0
19	MF	(England) ENG	Danny Stevens	45	3	19+20	3	2+2	0	1+0	0	1+0	0
20	FW	(Scotland) SCO	Martin Gritton	15	0	3+9	0	0+1	0	0+0	0	0+2	0
21	MF	(England) ENG	Romone Rose	6	1	2+3	1	1+0	0	0+0	0	0+0	0
22	MF	(England) ENG	Damon Lathrope	24	0	13+8	0	0+1	0	0+1	0	0+1	0
23	DF	(England) ENG	Guy Branston	53	2	48+0	2	3+0	0	1+0	0	1+0	0
24	FW	(England) ENG	Ashley Yeoman	0	0	0+0	0	0+0	0	0+0	0	0+0	0
25	DF	(England) ENG	Ed Palmer	0	0	0+0	0	0+0	0	0+0	0	0+0	0
26	FW	(England) ENG	Chris Zebroski	53	15	47+0	15	4+0	0	1+0	0	1+0	0
27	FW	(England) ENG	Ashley Hemmings	11	0	4+5	0	1+1	0	0+0	0	0+0	0
29	DF	(England) ENG	Danny Senda	3	0	2+0	0	0+0	0	0+0	0	1+0	0
29	MF	(England) ENG	Ben Pringle	5	0	5+0	0	0+0	0	0+0	0	0+0	0

Source: Torquay United

=== Top scorers ===
Place	Position	Nation	Number	Name	League Two ^{[1]}	FA Cup	League Cup	League Trophy	Total
1	FW	(England)	26	Chris Zebroski	15	0	0	0	15
2	FW	(England)	9	Elliot Benyon	13	1	0	0	14
3	FW	(Northern Ireland)	8	Billy Kee	9	1	0	0	10
4	MF	(Northern Ireland)	10	Eunan O'Kane	7	1	0	0	8
5	FW	(England)	9	Jake Robinson	7	0	0	0	7
6	FW	(England)	15	Gavin Tomlin	4	0	0	0	4
7	DF	(England)	3	Kevin Nicholson	3	0	0	0	3
=	MF	(England)	19	Danny Stevens	3	0	0	0	3
=	MF	(England)	11	Nicky Wroe	3	0	0	0	3
10	DF	(England)	23	Guy Branston	2	0	0	0	2
=	DF	(England)	4	Mark Ellis	2	0	0	0	2
=	DF	(Scotland)	5	Chris Robertson	2	0	0	0	2
13	FW	(Republic of Ireland)	11	Ronan Murray	1	0	0	0	1
=	MF	(England)	21	Romone Rose	1	0	0	0	1
=	DF	(England)	2	Lathaniel Rowe-Turner	1	0	0	0	1
=	MF	(England)	6	Craig Stanley	1	0	0	0	1
				Own goals	2	0	0	0	2
				TOTALS	76	3	0	0	79

Source: Torquay United

=== Disciplinary record ===
Number	Nation	Position	Name	League Two ^{[1]}		FA Cup		League Cup		League Trophy		Total	
Number	Nation	Position	Name	Yellow card	Red card	Yellow card	Red card	Yellow card	Red card	Yellow card	Red card	Yellow card	Red card
26	(England)	FW	Chris Zebroski	9	0	2	1	1	0	0	0	12	1
23	(England)	DF	Guy Branston	10	0	3	0	0	0	0	0	13	0
18	(England)	MF	Joe Oastler	8	0	0	0	0	0	0	0	8	0
7	(England)	MF	Lee Mansell	6	1	0	0	0	0	0	0	6	1
5	(Scotland)	DF	Chris Robertson	7	0	0	0	0	0	0	0	7	0
4	(England)	MF	Mark Ellis	3	1	1	0	0	0	0	0	4	1
6	(England)	MF	Craig Stanley	5	0	0	0	0	0	0	0	5	0
9	(England)	FW	Elliot Benyon	4	0	0	0	1	0	0	0	5	0
10	(Northern Ireland)	MF	Eunan O'Kane	4	0	0	0	0	0	0	0	4	0
20	(Scotland)	FW	Martin Gritton	2	0	0	0	0	0	1	0	3	0
11	(England)	MF	Nicky Wroe	2	0	1	0	0	0	0	0	3	0
8	(Northern Ireland)	FW	Billy Kee	1	0	1	0	0	0	0	0	2	0
22	(England)	MF	Damon Lathrope	2	0	0	0	0	0	0	0	2	0
3	(England)	DF	Kevin Nicholson	2	0	0	0	0	0	0	0	2	0
19	(England)	MF	Danny Stevens	2	0	0	0	0	0	0	0	2	0
14	(England)	MF	Lloyd Macklin	0	1	0	0	0	0	0	0	0	1
6	(England)	DF	Kieran Charnock	0	0	0	0	0	0	1	0	1	0
15	(England)	FW	Gavin Tomlin	1	0	0	0	0	0	0	0	1	0
17	(England)	MF	Saul Halpin	1	0	0	0	0	0	0	0	1	0
21	(England)	MF	Romone Rose	1	0	0	0	0	0	0	0	1	0
15	(England)	FW	Gavin Tomlin	1	0	0	0	0	0	0	0	1	0
			TOTALS	71	3	8	1	2	0	2	0	83	4

Source: Torquay United

^{1} . League Two statistics include the League Two play-offs.

=== Transfers ===
==== In ====
Date	Nat.	Pos.	Name	From	Fee	References
19 July 2010	(England)	MF	Damon Lathrope	Norwich City	Free	
21 July 2010	(England)	DF	Guy Branston	Burton Albion	Free	
16 September 2010	(England)	DF	Danny Senda	Millwall	Free	
14 March 2011	(England)	FW	Ray Spear	Trainee	n/a	
28 June 2011	(England)	MF	Joe Oastler	Queens Park Rangers	Free	
28 June 2011	(England)	FW	Chris McPhee	Kidderminster Harriers	Free	
28 June 2011	(England)	DF	Daniel Leadbitter	Newcastle United	Free	

==== Loans in ====
Date	Nat.	Pos.	Name	From	Expiry date	References
28 July 2010	(Scotland)	FW	Martin Gritton	Chesterfield	10 January 2011	
8 October 2010	(England)	MF	Joe Oastler	Queens Park Rangers	End of season	
22 October 2010	(England)	MF	Romone Rose	Queens Park Rangers	31 December 2010	
22 October 2010	(England)	FW	Ashley Hemmings	Wolverhampton Wanderers	31 January 2011	
31 January 2011	(England)	FW	Jake Robinson	Shrewsbury Town	End of season	
31 January 2011	(England)	MF	Craig Stanley	Morecambe	3 May 2011	
10 February 2011	(England)	MF	Ryan Gilligan	Northampton Town	3 March 2011	
4 March 2011	(England)	MF	Ben Pringle	Derby County	22 March 2011	
9 March 2011	(Republic of Ireland)	FW	Ronan Murray	Ipswich Town	25 April 2011	
10 March 2011	(England)	FW	Gavin Tomlin	Dagenham & Redbridge	End of season	

==== Out ====
Date	Nat.	Pos.	Name	To	Fee	References
16 December 2010	(Northern Ireland)	MF	Wayne Carlisle	Released	n/a	
16 December 2010	(England)	DF	Danny Senda	Released	n/a	
5 January 2011	(England)	DF	Kieran Charnock	Morecambe	Undisclosed	
31 January 2011	(England)	FW	Elliot Benyon	Swindon Town	Undisclosed	
31 January 2011	(England)	MF	Nicky Wroe	Shrewsbury Town	Undisclosed	
31 May 2011	(England)	GK	Danny Potter	Newport County	Free	
30 June 2011	(England)	GK	Scott Bevan	Bristol Rovers	Free	
30 June 2011	(England)	DF	Guy Branston	Bradford City	Free	

==== Loans out ====
Date	Nat.	Pos.	Name	To	Expiry date	References
25 November 2010	(England)	DF	Kieran Charnock	Morecambe	5 January 2011	
February 2011	(England)	DF	Ed Palmer	Weymouth	April 2011	
