= Elliot Benyon =

English footballer (born 1987)

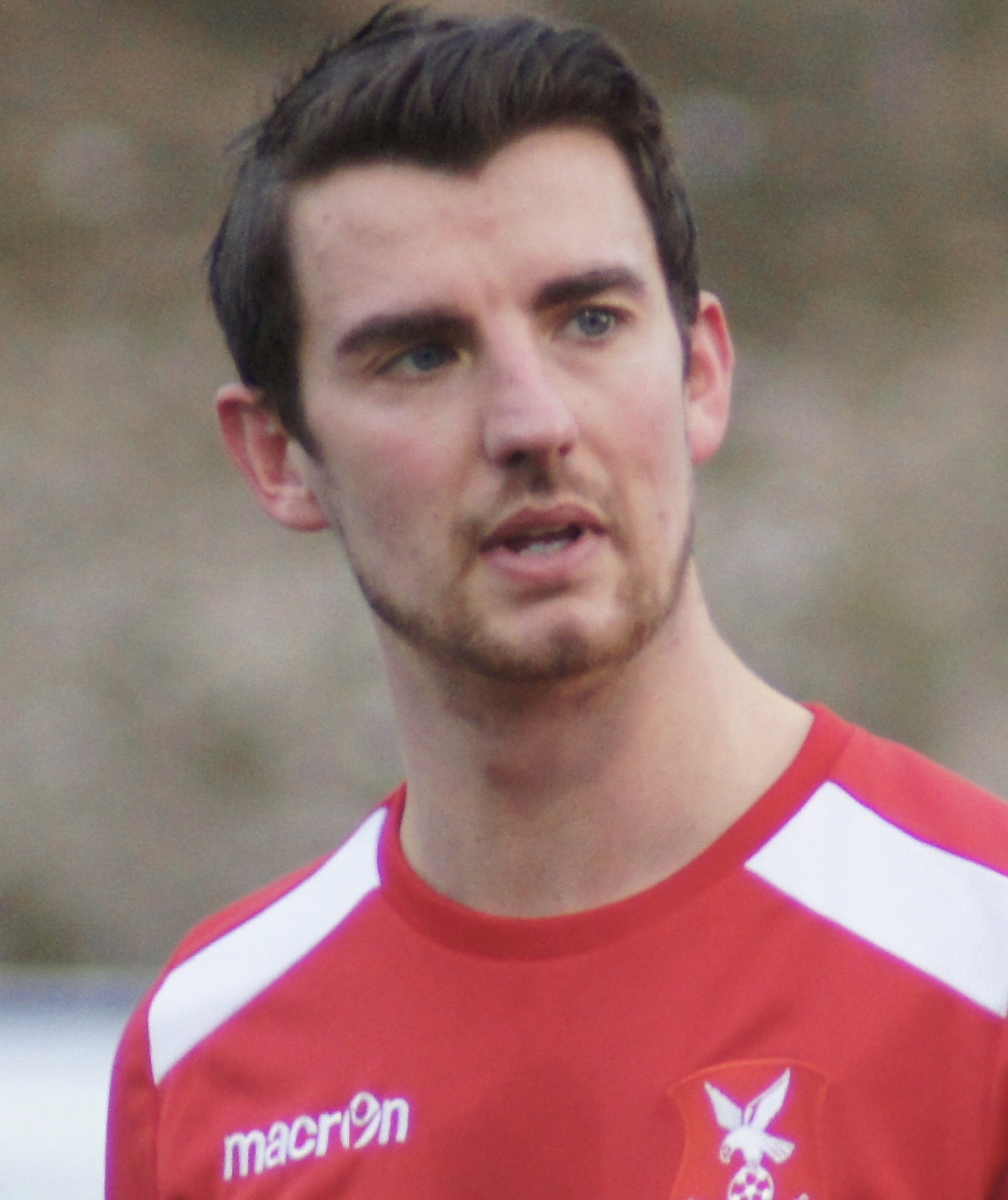
- Elliot Benyon playing for Whitehawk in 2018

Personal information
- Full name: Elliot Paul Benyon
- Date of birth: 29 August 1987 (age 39)
- Place of birth: High Wycombe, England
- Position: Forward

Team information
- Current team: Hanwell Town
- Number: 10

Youth career
- 2003–2006: Bristol City

Senior career*
Years	Team	Apps	(Gls)
2006–2007	Bristol City	0	(0)
2006–2007	→ St Albans City (loan)	12	(6)
2007	→ Crawley Town (loan)	15	(3)
2007–2011	Torquay United	125	(39)
2011–2012	Swindon Town	12	(1)
2011	→ Wycombe Wanderers (loan)	9	(0)
2012–2013	Southend United	21	(2)
2013	→ Torquay United (loan)	15	(4)
2013–2015	Torquay United	43	(3)
2014–2015	→ Hayes & Yeading United (loan)	12	(2)
2015–2016	Hayes & Yeading United	41	(17)
2016–2017	Wealdstone	43	(19)
2017	→ Enfield Town (loan)	4	(1)
2017–2018	Whitehawk	17	(7)
2018	Leatherhead	5	(0)
2018–2019	Hayes & Yeading United	5	(3)
2019–2022	Oxford City	64	(9)
2022–2023	Slough Town	22	(3)
2023-	Hanwell Town	0	(0)
- * Club domestic league appearances and goals as of 22:10, 20 February 2023 (UTC)

Elliot Paul Benyon (born 29 August 1987) is an English footballer who plays for Hanwell Town as a striker.

== Career ==
Benyon began his career as a trainee at Bristol City after being spotted playing local football in High Wycombe. Despite making no first team appearances for the club, impressive loan spells to National Conference sides St Albans City and Crawley Town in the 2006–07 season caught the eye of Paul Buckle, who signed Benyon in June 2007 to play for Torquay United, who had themselves just been relegated from the Football League.

Despite struggling to gain a regular starting place in his first season with the Gulls, Benyon still managed a total of 22 appearances, scoring five times in the 2007–08 season and also made a second-half substitute appearance at Wembley in Torquay's 1–0 defeat to Ebbsfleet United in the 2008 FA Trophy final.

Benyon found more regular places in the starting line-up for Torquay in the 2008–09 season, making a total of 36 league appearances. The season culminated with a second Wembley appearance in two years for both Benyon and Torquay United when the Gulls beat Cambridge United 2–0 in the Conference National Play-off final in May 2009 to regain a place back in the Football League. Cambridge defender Phil Bolland was sent off for a foul on Benyon.

In July 2009, Benyon agreed a fresh one-year contract with the newly promoted Gulls and became an important first team player as his 15 goals in all competitions helped Torquay survive a difficult first season back in League Two. He scored 14 goals by the middle of the 2010–11 season and in January 2011 joined League One Swindon Town for an undisclosed fee, signing a two-and-a-half-year contract after The Robins sold Charlie Austin to Burnley. He scored an injury time equaliser on his debut against Rochdale. At the end of that season, Swindon were relegated to League Two and on 20 June 2011, Benyon was signed on a season long loan by his home town club Wycombe Wanderers, who had themselves just been promoted to League One. He made his debut as a 66th minute replacement for Gareth Ainsworth in a 1–1 away draw against Colchester United, and scored his first goal in the League Cup against Nottingham Forest.

Benyon signed for League Two club Southend United in January 2012 for an undisclosed fee. He started his first game for Southend on 2 January, against Dagenham & Redbridge, before being substituted late on for Neil Harris. He found first team opportunities limited at Southend and in February 2013 rejoined former club Torquay United on a month's loan with an option to extend the deal to the end of the season. He was then released by Southend at the end of the season, before rejoining Torquay permanently in July 2013.

In January 2015 Benyon joined Hayes & Yeading United on loan, signing permanently for the Conference South side at the end of the season. In the 2015–2016 season, Benyon was leading goalscorer and player of the year, despite his side suffering relegation. In May 2016 he joined Wealdstone, before signing for league rivals Whitehawk in December 2017, following a short loan spell at Enfield Town. Benyon scored on his debut for The Hawks in a 4–1 victory at Eastbourne Borough on 1 January 2018.

== Leatherhead ==
On Tuesday 23 May 2018, Benyon joined Leatherhead.

== Hayes and Yeading ==
On 22 December 2018, Benyon re-joined Hayes & Yeading United.

== Oxford City ==
Benyon joined National League South side Oxford City in October 2019, scoring his first goals for the club against Hornchurch in an FA Trophy replay.

== Slough Town ==
In June 2022, Benyon joined Slough Town.

== Hanwell Town ==
In August 2023, Benyon joined Hanwell Town.

== Career statistics ==
As of match played 28 April 2018

Appearances and goals by club, season and competition
Club	Season	League			FA Cup		League Cup		Other		Total	
Club	Season	Division	Apps	Goals	Apps	Goals	Apps	Goals	Apps	Goals	Apps	Goals
St Albans City (loan)	2006–07	Conference Premier	12	6	0	0	—		0	0	12	6
Crawley Town (loan)	2006–07	Conference Premier	15	3	0	0	—		0	0	15	3
Torquay United	2007–08	Conference Premier	22	4	2	0	—		1 (Note: Appearances in FA Trophy)	0	25	4
Torquay United	2008–09	Conference Premier	35	10	4	2	—		0	0	39	12
Torquay United	2009–10	League Two	45	11	3	3	1	0	2 (Note: Appearances in Football League Trophy)	1	51	15
Torquay United	2010–11	League Two	23	13	3	1	1	0	2	0	29	14
Torquay United	Total		125	38	12	6	2	0	5	1	144	45
Swindon Town	2010–11	League One	12	1	—		—		—		12	1
Wycombe Wanderers (loan)	2011–12	League One	9	0	1	0	1	1	2	0	14	1
Southend United	2011–12	League Two	16	2	—		—		1 (Note: Appearance in League Two play-offs)	0	17	2
Southend United	2012–13	League Two	5	0	3	0	1	0	2	0	11	0
Southend United	Total		21	2	3	0	1	0	3	0	28	2
Torquay United (loan)	2012–13	League Two	15	4	—		—		—		15	4
Torquay United	2013–14	League Two	37	3	1	0	1	0	1	0	40	3
Torquay United	2014–15	Conference Premier	6	0	0	0	—		0	0	6	0
Torquay United	Total		58	7	1	0	1	0	1	0	61	7
Hayes & Yeading United (loan)	2014–15	Conference South	12	2	0	0	—		0	0	12	2
Hayes & Yeading United	2015–16	National League South	41	17	1	0	—		1	1	43	18
Wealdstone	2016–17	National League South	33	16	3	2	—		4	2	40	20
Wealdstone	2017–18	National League South	10	3	0	0	—		0	0	10	3
Wealdstone	Total		43	19	3	2	0	0	4	2	50	23
Enfield Town (loan)	2017–18	Isthmian League Premier	4	1	0	0	—		1 (Note: Appearances in the Middlesex Senior Cup)	0	5	1
Whitehawk	2017–18	National League South	17	7	0	0	—		1	1	18	8
Career total			369	103	21	8	5	1	18	5	413	117
