= Chris Zebroski =

English footballer (born 1986)

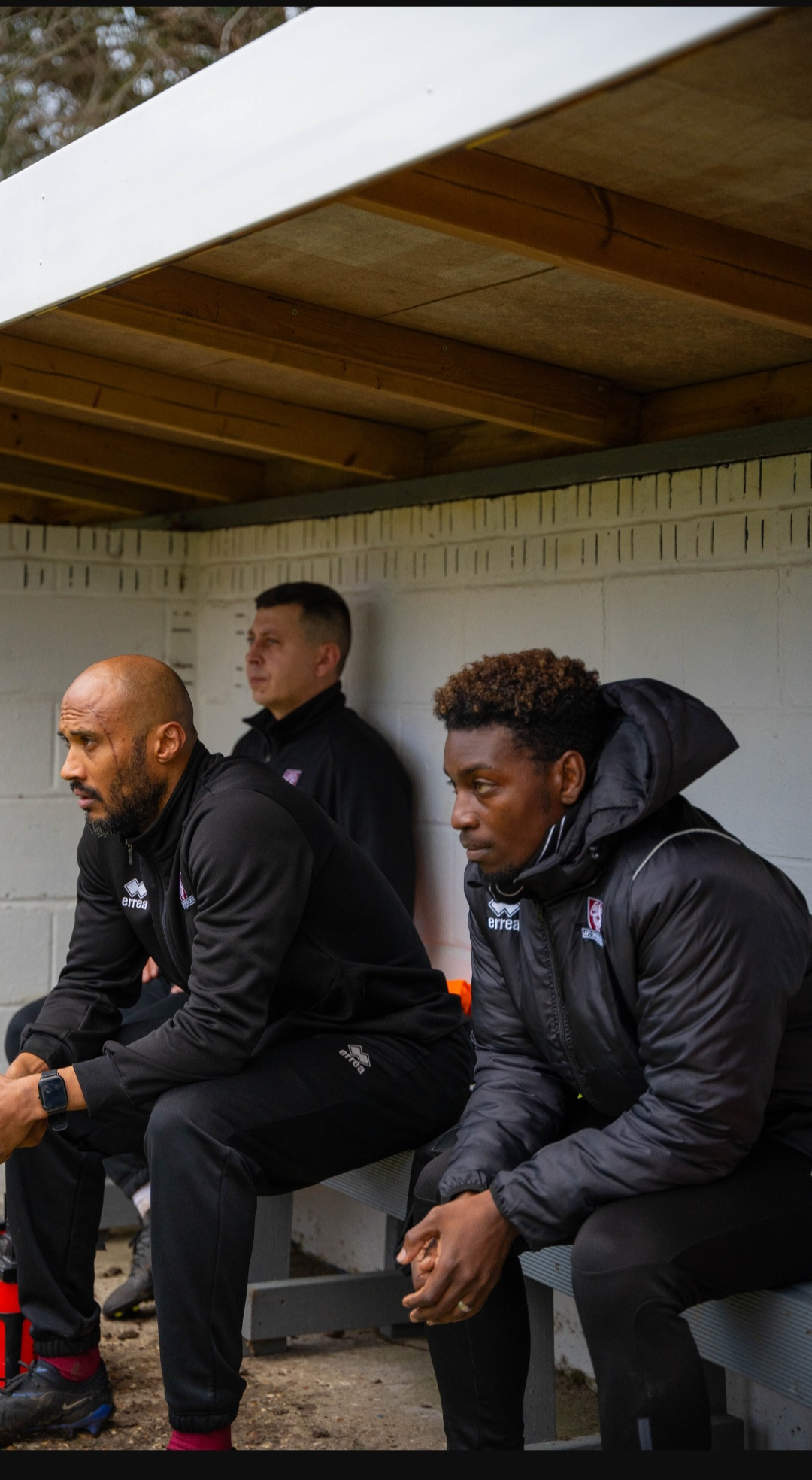
- Zebroski (left) and Jermaine McGlashan (right) watching the match from the dugout.

Personal information
- Full name: Christopher Matthew Zebroski
- Date of birth: 29 October 1986 (age 40)
- Place of birth: Swindon, England
- Position: Forward

Team information
- Current team: Gosport Borough (player-coach)

Youth career
- Cirencester Academy
- 2003–2004: Swindon Town
- 2004–2005: Plymouth Argyle

Senior career*
Years	Team	Apps	(Gls)
2005–2006	Plymouth Argyle	4	(0)
2006–2008	Millwall	25	(3)
2007	→ Oxford United (loan)	10	(2)
2007–2008	→ Torquay United (loan)	46	(19)
2008–2010	Wycombe Wanderers	48	(9)
2009–2010	→ Torquay United (loan)	7	(4)
2010–2011	Torquay United	67	(19)
2011–2012	Bristol Rovers	39	(3)
2012–2013	Cheltenham Town	21	(5)
2013	Eastleigh	12	(3)
2013–2015	Newport County	71	(19)
2017–2019	Eastleigh	75	(12)
2019–2021	Chippenham Town	28	(5)
2021	Malmesbury Victoria	21	(20)
2021	Swindon Supermarine	5	(2)
2021–2022	Wantage Town		
2022	Melksham Town	8	(3)
2023	Fleet Town	7	(2)
2023–2024	AFC Croydon Athletic	16	(0)
2024	Royal Wootton Bassett Town	10	(8)
2024–2025	Taunton Town	22	(4)
2025	Yate Town	13	(3)
2025–2026	Taunton Town	4	(0)
2026	Yate Town	17	(2)
2026–	Gosport Borough	3	(0)
- * Club domestic league appearances and goals as of 19:18, 1 October 2026 (UTC)

Christopher Matthew Zebroski (born 29 October 1986) is an English footballer who plays as a forward for Southern League Premier Division South club Gosport Borough, where he holds the role of player-coach.

== Club career ==
Zebroski was a youth player for his hometown club Swindon Town, but was released after failing to earn a professional contract. After his release there he trained under the watch of former Wales international Steve Lowndes at Cirencester football academy, it was from here that he was spotted by scouts of Championship club Plymouth Argyle and signed as a youth player by the club. He later signed a professional contract, and made four first-team appearances for Argyle before his contract was terminated after he was found guilty of gross misconduct by the club. This followed an incident involving the club captain Paul Wotton.

Three weeks after leaving Plymouth Argyle, he was signed for Millwall by manager Nigel Spackman. On 21 March 2007, Zebroski joined Oxford United on a month's loan. On 31 July 2007, Zebroski signed for Conference National side Torquay United on loan until May 2008, and went on to score 19 goals in league and cup competitions during the 2007–08 season.

He was transferred to Wycombe Wanderers for £20,000 in June 2008. Zebroski finished the 2008–09 season with seven goals from 33 league matches, mostly from the wing, helping the team win promotion to League One. The start of the 2009–10 season saw Zebroski score two goals in a 3–2 defeat at Charlton Athletic.On 20 November 2009, Zebroski returned to Torquay United on loan with a view to permanent transfer in January. On 26 November 2010 Zebroski was given a 12-month community order and fine for kicking and punching a soldier in a street fight in Torquay in August 2010. He scored twice in a 5–0 home win against Darlington on 12 December and the move later became permanent.

After helping the club avoid relegation from League Two during the 2009–10 campaign, Zebroski scored 16 league goals to help the club finish seventh and reach the play-offs the following season. In the semi-final first leg versus Shrewsbury at Plainmoor, Zebroski scored the first goal to set up a 2–0 victory. The second leg finished 0–0, leaving Torquay to play Stevenage in the play-off final at Old Trafford. Stevenage won the match 1–0. In July 2011 he followed former Torquay manager Paul Buckle to his new club, Bristol Rovers.

In August 2012 Zebroski joined Cheltenham Town. His contract with Cheltenham was cancelled by mutual consent on 4 January 2013 after Zebroski withdrew from the matchday squad at short notice on a number of occasions.

On Monday 25 February 2013, it was announced that Zebroski had joined Conference South side Eastleigh. He scored his first goal for the club in the 1–0 win over Eastbourne Borough on 2 March 2013.

On 5 June 2013 Zebroski signed for newly promoted League Two club Newport County. He was selected as Newport County's Player of the Year for the 2013–14 season. In April 2015 he was jailed for 4 years and 4 months after he "admitted four charges of robbery, attempted robbery and assault relating to two incidents". Zebroski attributed the incidents to alcoholism, and failed in an appeal against the sentence. He served two years of his sentence at HMP Prescoed, and was released in 2017.

Following his release from prison, Zebroski rejoined Eastleigh in June 2017.

On 8 August 2019, Zebroski signed for National League South side Chippenham Town. He departed the club in May 2021.

Zebroski joined Hellenic Football League Division One side Malmesbury Victoria in August 2021. Less than one month later, he joined Southern Football League Premier Division South side Swindon Supermarine. In December 2021 he transferred to Wantage Town. Following Wantage Town's relegation, Zebroski joined Melksham Town in July 2022.

In December 2024, Zebroski joined Taunton Town following a spell with Royal Wootton Bassett Town. In August 2025, he joined Yate Town. He returned to Taunton Town in December 2025, before returning to Yate Town the following month.

In August 2026, Zebroski joined Gosport Borough in the role of player-coach, once again supporting Jermaine McGlashan.

On 18 November 2026, Zebroski was sentenced following an attack on a man he had headbutted in June 2026. He received a 30-week prison sentence, suspended for 18 months, ordered to carry out 150 hours of unpaid work, complete 80 days of alcohol abstinence monitoring, and pay £2,500 in compensation to the victim.

== Coaching career ==
On 12 December 2022, Zebroski signed for Combined Counties League Premier Division South club Fleet Town as a player-coach.

On 11 October 2023, Zebroski, was appointed assistant manager of AFC Croydon Athletic, following manager Jermaine McGlashan from Fleet Town. He stepped down from his role alongside McGlashan in September 2024.

== Career statistics ==
As of match played 30 December 2017

Appearances and goals by club, season and competition
Club	Season	League			FA Cup		League Cup		Other		Total	
Club	Season	Division	Apps	Goals	Apps	Goals	Apps	Goals	Apps	Goals	Apps	Goals
Plymouth Argyle	2005–06	Championship	4	0	0	0	1	0	0	0	5	0
Millwall	2006–07	League One	25	3	4	0	1	0	2 (Note: Appearance(s) in Football League Trophy)	0	32	3
Oxford United (loan)	2006–07	Conference National	8	2	0	0	—		2 (Note: Appearances in Conference National play-offs)	0	10	2
Torquay United (loan)	2007–08	Conference Premier	46	18	1	0	—		5 (Note: Three appearances in FA Trophy; two appearances and a goal in Conference Premier play-offs)	1	52	19
Wycombe Wanderers	2008–09	League Two	33	7	2	0	1	0	1	0	37	7
Wycombe Wanderers	2009–10	League One	15	2	2	0	1	0	0	0	18	2
Wycombe Wanderers	Total		48	9	4	0	2	0	1	0	55	9
Torquay United (loan)	2009–10	League Two	7	4	—		—		—		7	4
Torquay United	2009–10	League Two	23	2	—		—		—		23	2
Torquay United	2010–11	League Two	44	14	4	0	1	0	4 (Note: One appearance in the Football League Trophy; three appearances and a goal in the League Two play-offs)	1	53	15
Torquay United	Total		67	16	4	0	1	0	4	1	76	17
Bristol Rovers	2011–12	League Two	39	3	3	1	2	1	0	0	44	5
Cheltenham Town	2012–13	League Two	21	5	2	1	1	0	0	0	24	6
Eastleigh	2012–13	Conference South	12	3	0	0	—		2 (Note: Appearances in the Conference South play-offs)	1	14	4
Newport County	2013–14	League Two	35	12	1	0	2	0	1	1	39	13
Newport County	2014–15	League Two	36	7	1	0	0	0	1	0	38	7
Newport County	Total		71	19	2	0	2	0	2	1	77	20
Eastleigh	2017–18	National League	22	11	0	0	—		1 (Note: Appearance in FA Trophy)	0	23	11
Career total			370	85	20	2	10	1	19	4	419	92

== Honours ==
Wycombe Wanderers

- Football League Two third-place promotion: 2008–09

AFC Croydon

- CC play-off winners: 2024

Individual

- Newport County Player of the Season: 2013–14
