= Guy Branston =

English footballer (born 1979)

Personal information
- Full name: Guy Peter Bromley Branston
- Date of birth: 9 January 1979 (age 47)
- Place of birth: Leicester, England
- Height: 6 ft 1 in (1.85 m)
- Position: Centre back

Senior career*
Years	Team	Apps	(Gls)
1997–1999	Leicester City	0	(0)
1997	→ Rushden & Diamonds (loan)	?	(?)
1998	→ Colchester United (loan)	12	(1)
1998	→ Colchester United (loan)	1	(0)
1998–1999	→ Plymouth Argyle (loan)	7	(1)
1999	→ Rushden & Diamonds (loan)	?	(?)
1999	→ Lincoln City (loan)	4	(0)
1999	→ Rotherham United (loan)	5	(0)
1999–2004	Rotherham United	99	(13)
2003	→ Wycombe Wanderers (loan)	9	(0)
2004	→ Peterborough United (loan)	14	(0)
2004–2005	Sheffield Wednesday	11	(0)
2004–2005	→ Peterborough United (loan)	4	(1)
2005–2006	Oldham Athletic	45	(2)
2006–2007	Peterborough United	26	(0)
2007	→ Rochdale (loan)	4	(0)
2007	→ Northampton Town (loan)	3	(0)
2008	Notts County	1	(0)
2008–2009	Kettering Town^{1}	39	(0)
2009–2010	Burton Albion	19	(0)
2010	→ Torquay United (loan)	16	(0)
2010–2011	Torquay United	45	(2)
2011–2012	Bradford City	16	(1)
2011	→ Rotherham United (loan)	2	(0)
2012–2013	Aldershot Town	3	(0)
2012	→ Bristol Rovers (loan)	4	(1)
2013–2014	Plymouth Argyle	31	(0)
Total		420	(22)

Managerial career
- 2015–2016: Notts County (chief scout)
- 2016: Nuneaton Town (operations manager)
- 2017: Chesterfield (caretaker)
- * Club domestic league appearances and goals

Guy Peter Bromley Branston (born 9 January 1979) is an English former professional footballer who played as a centre back. He currently owns a football agency company.

He has played in the Football League for Colchester United, Plymouth Argyle, Lincoln City, Rotherham United, Wycombe Wanderers, Peterborough United, Sheffield Wednesday, Oldham Athletic, Rochdale, Northampton Town, Notts County, Burton Albion, Torquay United, Bradford City, Aldershot Town and Bristol Rovers. Born in Leicester, he has captained several clubs, won player of the year awards and been voted into the divisional PFA Team of the Year by his peers.

Branston retired from professional football on 4 July 2014, following his release from Plymouth Argyle three months earlier.

== Career ==
=== Leicester City ===
Branston began his career as a trainee at Leicester City but never made a first team appearance for the club. He did, however, go out on loan on seven occasions including spells at Rushden & Diamonds (twice), Colchester United (twice), Plymouth Argyle, Lincoln City and finally Rotherham United, who he would then join permanently in November 1999.

=== Rotherham United ===
Branston established his career at Rotherham United after being bought for £50,000 from Leicester City and enjoyed two successive promotions with the Millers in his first two years with the club, and kept his place in the team during the Championship years. In his final season at the club – 2003/04 – he went out on loan twice. He initially joined Wycombe Wanderers, where he scored once in the Football League Trophy against Cambridge United, and then joined Peterborough United on loan; his first of what proved to be 3 spells at the club. Branston scored 13 goals in 104 league appearances for Rotherham.

=== Sheffield Wednesday ===
In June 2004 he was signed by Sheffield Wednesday. Whilst at Wednesday he made 11 league appearances and again went on loan to Peterborough United, where he scored once against Wrexham.

=== Oldham Athletic ===
In February 2005 Branston joined Oldham Athletic and went on to make 45 league appearances and score two goals.

=== Peterborough United ===
Branston joined Peterborough on 24 July 2006, from Oldham Athletic, after wanting to move closer to home. He had impressed for Peterborough in two previous loan spells where he proved to be a leader and as a result was given the captain's armband. He scored his first goal in his third spell at the club in a League Cup tie against Ipswich Town.

After just one season though, he fell out of favour, and was loaned to both Rochdale and Northampton Town, before being released from his contract on 13 December 2007.

=== Notts County ===
He signed for Notts County on 1 January 2008 for one month.

=== Kettering Town ===
In February 2008, Branston joined Conference National side Kettering Town on an 18-month deal. He established himself in the starting XI, was assigned the captain's role, and following a string of impressive displays he signed a new, extended deal in December 2008, contracting him to the club until 2010, following interest from other clubs, including Conference rivals Stevenage Borough.

=== Burton Albion ===
Branston signed for Burton Albion on 16 July 2009. Despite being in talks with Torquay United after a £10,000 fee was agreed for his transfer from Kettering, Burton were able to complete the signing on a free transfer after it was discovered Branston had not been properly registered with The FA.

Branston was sent off three times in his short Burton Albion career, taking his total career tally to 18 red cards. Whenever Branston got sent off, Jeff Stelling, the presenter of Soccer Saturday stated that Branston has got himself in a pickle, referring to the brand of pickle, Branston Pickle.

Branston joined Torquay United on loan at the end of January 2010. Having made 16 appearances for the club during the second half of the 2009–10 season, he was voted runner-up for the club's player of the year award.

=== Torquay United ===
Branston was released by Burton Albion on 20 July 2010 and subsequently signed a one-year deal with Torquay on 21 July 2010. He scored his first goal in four years and his first for Torquay in 2011 in a 3–3 draw with Macclesfield Town and scored again four days later in the 2–1 win against Cheltenham Town. In April 2011, he won the Torquay United player of the year award and was named in the PFA Team of the Year for League Two.

=== Bradford City ===
In the summer of 2011, Branston signed for League Two side Bradford City, and scored his first goal for the club in a 4–2 win over Barnet. However, manager Peter Jackson left his position and his replacement Phil Parkinson opted to loan Branston to Rotherham United.

=== Aldershot Town ===
On 25 June 2012, Branston joined Aldershot Town on a free transfer. He made his debut as an 88th minute substitute on 4 September in a victory over Exeter City in the Football League Trophy first round.

==== Bristol Rovers (loan) ====
Branston joined Bristol Rovers on loan in November until the beginning of 2013. "Guy is a very experienced centre half at this level," said Rovers manager Mark McGhee. "He is a straight forward uncompromising player, who competes well, and I think he will do a good job for us." He scored on his debut in a 3–3 draw with former club Bradford City and was critical of Bradford manager Parkinson. "I had a hard time at Bradford," said Branston. "He stitched me up last year and made me work really hard for something that was never going to materialise. The only way you can show them is by being on the pitch and playing well." Branston made three more appearances for Rovers before McGhee was replaced by John Ward as manager, and returned to Aldershot when the loan expired. In January, he had his contract with Aldershot cancelled by mutual consent after playing in five matches for the club.

=== Plymouth Argyle ===
He rejoined Plymouth Argyle later that month on a contract until the end of the 2012–13 campaign. "I know what Guy's all about, with his enthusiasm for the game. And he knows the game," said Argyle manager John Sheridan after Branston made his debut in a 2–1 win against Morecambe. "He probably talks too much, but I like him as a lad. You could see the lift the players got from him. He gets on with everyone, he talks to the younger players and tell them off when he has to. But he'll give them a hug when he has to." Branston was an ever-present in the team for the rest of the season, making a further 18 appearances as the club avoided relegation from the Football League. He signed a one-year contract extension in May 2013.

His 2013–14 season was disrupted by niggling ankle and calf injuries, which limited him to 13 appearances by March 2014. A scan on Branston's ankle revealed he would not be able to play again for the rest of the season and, with little prospect of being offered a new contract, he was released by mutual consent to continue his ankle rehabilitation at home.

=== Post-playing career ===
In February 2015, he joined Notts County as Chief Scout and was tasked with overseeing all areas of scouting and recruitment at Meadow Lane. In May 2016, he parted company with the club. In July 2016, he was appointed as the operations' manager at Nuneaton Town.

Branston was appointed as Director of Recruitment and Development at Chesterfield on 1 April 2017. He became the caretaker manager of Chesterfield after the sacking of Gary Caldwell on 16 September 2017. Branston left Chesterfield by mutual consent the day before the club's appointment of Jack Lester.

On 1 July 2017 Branston was appointed as an academy coach with Leicester City.

A year later in 2018 Branston was appointed PDP Loans Manager at Leicester City. He left the club on 22 April 2022 to become an agent.

In 2023, Branston started Game Changer Football Agency alongside fellow former footballer and agent Lee Philpott.

== Career statistics ==
Appearances and goals by club, season and competition
Club	Season	League			FA Cup		League Cup		Other (Note: Includes Football League Trophy, FA Trophy and Football League play-offs.)		Total	
Club	Season	Division	Apps	Goals	Apps	Goals	Apps	Goals	Apps	Goals	Apps	Goals
Leicester City	1997–98	Premier League	0	0	0	0	0	0	0	0	0	0
Leicester City	1998–99	Premier League	0	0	0	0	0	0	0	0	0	0
Rushden & Diamonds (loan)	1997–98	Conference	31	1	0	0	0	0	0	0	31	1
Colchester United (loan)	1997–98	Division Three	13	1	0	0	0	0	0	0	13	1
Colchester United (loan)	1998–99	Division Two	1	0	0	0	0	0	0	0	1	0
Plymouth Argyle (loan)	1998–99	Division Three	7	2	0	0	0	0	1	0	8	1
Rushden & Diamonds (loan)	1998–99	Conference	0	0	0	0	0	0	0	0	0	0
Lincoln City (loan)	1999–2000	Division Three	4	0	0	0	2	0	0	0	6	0
Rotherham United (loan)	1999–2000	Division Three	5	0	0	0	0	0	0	0	5	0
Rotherham United	1999–2000	Division Three	25	4	0	0	0	0	2	0	27	4
Rotherham United	2000–01	Division Two	41	6	3	0	2	0	0	0	46	6
Rotherham United	2001–02	Division One	10	1	0	0	1	0	0	0	11	1
Rotherham United	2002–03	Division One	15	2	0	0	2	0	0	0	17	2
Rotherham United	2003–04	Division One	8	0	1	0	1	0	0	0	10	0
Rotherham United	Total		99	13	4	0	6	0	2	0	111	13
Wycombe Wanderers (loan)	2003–04	Division Two	9	0	0	0	0	0	2	1	11	1
Peterborough United (loan)	2003–04	Division Two	14	0	0	0	0	0	0	0	14	0
Sheffield Wednesday	2004–05	League One	11	0	1	0	1	0	0	0	13	0
Peterborough United (loan)	2004–05	League One	4	1	0	0	0	0	0	0	4	1
Oldham Athletic	2004–05	League One	7	1	0	0	0	0	1	0	8	1
Oldham Athletic	2005–06	League One	38	1	2	0	1	0	1	0	42	1
Oldham Athletic	Total		45	2	2	0	1	0	2	0	50	2
Peterborough United	2006–07	League Two	24	0	3	0	2	1	1	0	30	1
Peterborough United	2007–08	League Two	2	0	0	0	0	0	0	0	2	0
Peterborough United	Total		26	0	3	0	2	1	1	0	32	1
Rochdale (loan)	2007–08	League Two	4	0	0	0	1	0	1	0	6	0
Northampton Town (loan)	2007–08	League One	3	0	1	0	0	0	0	0	3	0
Notts County	2007–08	League Two	1	0	0	0	0	0	0	0	1	0
Kettering Town	2007–08	Conference North	0	0	0	0	0	0	0	0	0	0
Kettering Town	2008–09	Conference	39	0	5	0	0	0	1	0	45	0
Kettering Town	Total		39	0	5	0	0	0	1	0	45	0
Burton Albion	2009–10	League Two	19	0	2	0	1	0	1	0	23	0
Torquay United (loan)	2009–10	League Two	16	0	0	0	0	0	0	0	16	0
Torquay United	2010–11	League Two	45	2	3	0	1	0	4	0	53	2
Bradford City	2011–12	League Two	16	1	0	0	1	0	2	0	19	1
Rotherham United (loan)	2011–12	League Two	2	0	2	0	0	0	0	0	4	0
Aldershot Town	2012–13	League Two	3	0	0	0	0	0	2	0	5	0
Bristol Rovers (loan)	2012–13	League Two	4	1	0	0	0	0	0	0	4	1
Career total			421	24	23	0	16	1	19	1	479	26

== Managerial statistics ==
Managerial record by team and tenure
Team	From	To	Record				
Team	From	To	P	W	D	L	Win %
Chesterfield (Caretaker)	16 September 2017	28 September 2017	2	0	0	2	0.0
Total			2	0	0	2	0.0

== Honours ==
=== Promotions ===
- 1997–98: Third Division Play-off winner (promotion to Second Division) – Colchester United
- 1999–00: Third Division runner-up (promotion to Second Division) – Rotherham United
- 2000–01: Second Division runner-up (promotion to First Division) – Rotherham United
- 2005–06: League One Play-off winner (promotion to Championship) – Sheffield Wednesday
- 2007–08: Conference North winner (promotion to Conference National) – Kettering Town

=== Individual ===
- PFA Team of the Year: 2010–11 Football League Two
- Torquay United Player of the Year: 2010–11

== Notes ==
1. Branston's appearances for Kettering Town in the Conference North are unknown, so only his appearances in the Conference National are included.
