= Romone Rose =

English footballer (born 1990)

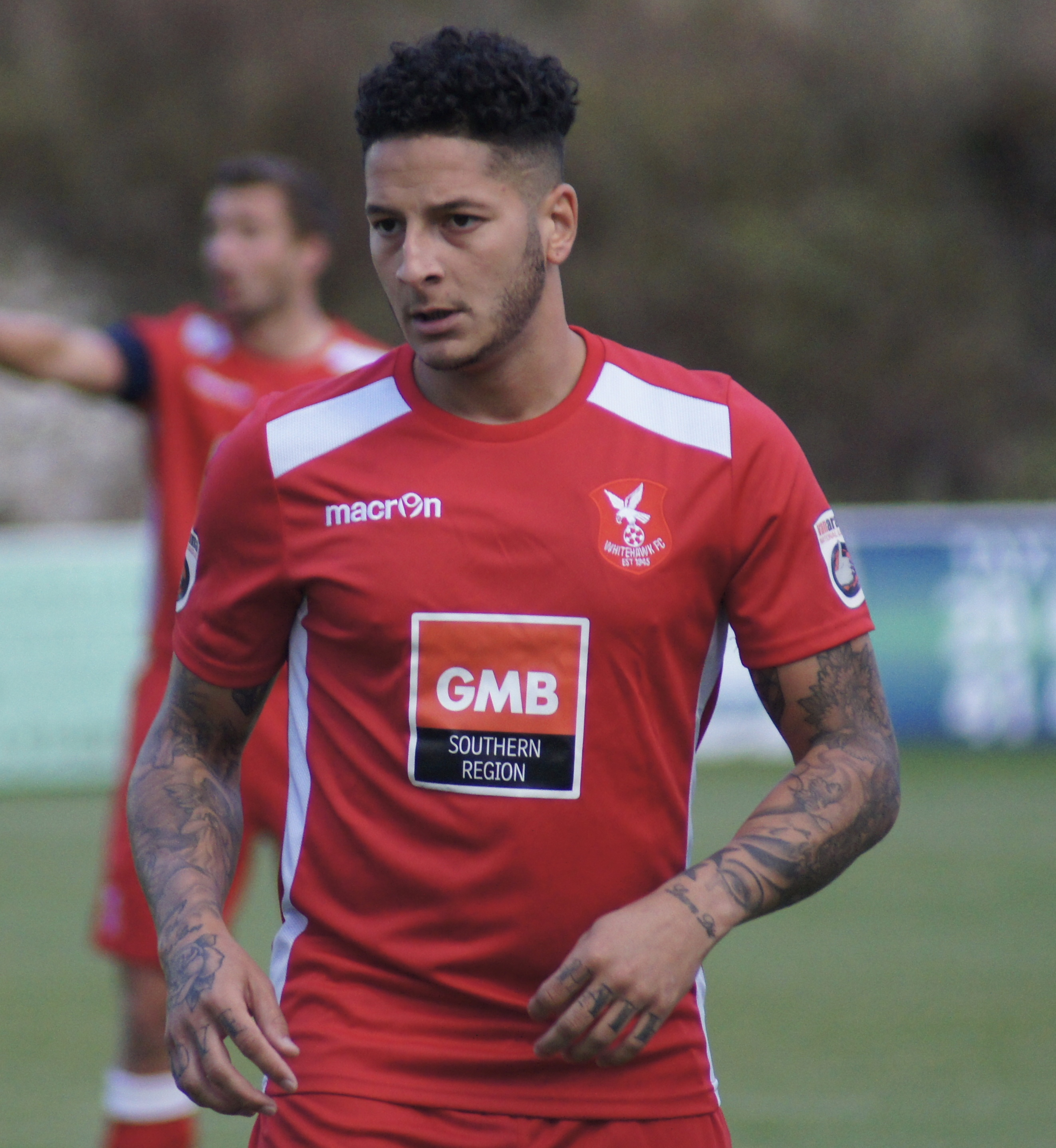
- Rose playing for Whitehawk in 2017

Personal information
- Full name: Romone Alexander Adolphus Rose
- Date of birth: 19 January 1990 (age 36)
- Place of birth: Reading, England
- Position: Midfielder

Youth career
- 2006–2008: Queens Park Rangers

Senior career*
Years	Team	Apps	(Gls)
2008–2011	Queens Park Rangers	6	(0)
2008	→ AFC Wimbledon (loan)	14	(4)
2008–2009	→ Histon (loan)	1	(0)
2009	→ Northampton Town (loan)	2	(0)
2009	→ Cheltenham Town (loan)	1	(0)
2010	→ Torquay United (loan)	5	(1)
2011	Muangthong United	1	(0)
2012	Newport County	14	(7)
2012–2013	Wealdstone	0	(0)
2013	Hemel Hempstead Town	1	(0)
2013	Maidenhead United	3	(0)
2013–2014	Eastleigh	10	(0)
2014	Droylsden	1	(0)
2014–2015	Staines Town	10	(0)
2015–2016	Marlow	9	(2)
2016–2017	Wealdstone	0	(0)
2016–2017	→ Basingstoke Town (dual registration)	21	(4)
2017	Gosport Borough	3	(0)
2017	Slough Town	1	(1)
2017	Hayes & Yeading United	4	(1)
2017–2018	Whitehawk	25	(2)
2018	Hungerford Town	0	(0)
- * Club domestic league appearances and goals as of 00:00, 1 August 2018 (UTC)

Romone Alexander Adolphus Rose (born 19 January 1990) is an English footballer who last played as a midfielder or defender for Hungerford Town.

== Career ==
Rose was born in Reading, Berkshire. He began his career as a trainee with Queens Park Rangers (QPR). He was a member of the Rangers' under-18 team that won the Youth Alliance League title in 2007, but in need of first team experience was loaned to Isthmian League AFC Wimbledon in February 2008. He returned to Rangers towards the end of the season and made his first team debut as a second half as a substitute for Hogan Ephraim against West Bromwich Albion on 4 May 2008. He joined Conference National side Histon on a month's loan in November, but played just once, as a substitute for Jamie Barker in Histon's 3–1 win away to Stevenage Borough. He returned to Rangers and on 13 January 2009 played as a substitute (for Gavin Mahon) as Rangers lost 2–1 after extra time away to Burnley in the FA Cup.

Next season, Rose joined Northampton Town on 5 August for a month. He made his Northampton debut in a 2–0 loss against Southampton in the League Cup on 11 August 2009. His only league appearance came when came off the bench in a 1–0 loss to Chesterfield.

On 8 October 2009 he was again sent out on loan, to Cheltenham Town, making his debut for them two days later against Accrington Stanley. He only made one appearance for the club before asking to return to QPR.

On 22 October 2010 Rose signed a three-month loan deal with Torquay United, making his debut on 23 October in a 1–1 draw at Gillingham. On 30 October 2010, Rose scored his first goal since on loan for AFC Wimbledon in a 3–1 win over Morecambe.

After his release from QPR, Rose joined Thai club Muangthong United and was handed the 11 shirt. Rose made one appearance for the club before being released. In January 2012, he joined Newport County on non-contract terms. On 12 May 2012, Rose played for Newport County in the 2012 FA Trophy Final at Wembley Stadium which Newport lost 2–0 to York City. He left Newport County at the end of the 2011–12 season. Rose signed for Isthmian League side Wealdstone on 19 November 2012.

Rose signed for Hemel Hempstead Town in February 2013, and then on 21 March 2013, he signed for Conference South side Maidenhead United.

On 23 August 2013, after playing in a number of pre-season friendlies, Rose signed for Conference South side Eastleigh. The contract was terminated by mutual consent in January 2014.

After a spell with Staines, Rose signed for Droylsden on 14 January 2015 and then Southern Division One Central side Marlow later in the same month.

He started the 2016–17 season at Wealdstone, and shortly after he signed on non-contract dual registration terms with Basingstoke Town. Further moves include Gosport Borough in January 2017, Slough Town in February 2017 and Hayes & Yeading United in March 2017.

Rose was on trial before the 2017–18 season at Brighton-based National League South side Whitehawk, managed by his former Newport County boss Jimmy Dack and secured a deal, assisted by a great goal scored in a pre-season friendly against Charlton Athletic U23. Rose scored his first goal for The Hawks in a 2–6 defeat at Bognor Regis Town in August 2017, establishing himself in the first team and appearing as both a midfielder and full-back.

He joined Hungerford Town for the 2018–19 campaign.
