= 2008–09 Torquay United F.C. season =

Torquay United
2008–09 season
- Chairman: Alex Rowe
- Manager: Paul Buckle
- Conference National: 4th (promoted via playoffs)
- FA Cup: Fourth round
- FA Trophy: Third round
- Conference League Cup: Fourth round
- Top goalscorer: League: Tim Sills (13); All: Tim Sills (17)
- Highest home attendance: 6,018 v Coventry City, 24 January 2009 (FA Cup)
- Lowest home attendance: 1,176 v Bath City, 13 December 2008 (FA Trophy)
- Average home league attendance: 3,278
Home colours	Away colours

The 2008–09 Torquay United F.C. season was Torquay United's second consecutive season in the Conference National. The season runs from 1 July 2008 to 30 June 2009.

== Overview ==
Despite gaining just five points from their first seven games, which saw the Gulls languishing in 18th place in the Conference, manager Paul Buckle soon set Torquay on a run of form which saw the team achieve a club record of seventeen games unbeaten.

Torquay also enjoyed their most successful FA Cup run since 1990. After easing through a qualifying round against Chipstead, the Gulls then had to see off Evesham and Oxford to set up a Third round clash with Championship side Blackpool. In one of the major upsets of the third round, the Gulls won the match 1–0 against a side placed three leagues above them. However, they were to narrowly lose their Fourth round tie to Coventry, also of the Championship, thanks to an 87th-minute header from Elliott Ward.

The 2008–09 season was also notable for the departure of two of Torquay's longest serving players. After a brief appearance in the 2008 FA Trophy Final defeat, Torquay's all-time leading appearance maker Kevin Hill made his official departure in July. Later in the season the Gulls also said farewell to another stalwart as defender Steve Woods left the club in April after an eight-year spell encompassing 281 appearances.

The season ultimately finished in thrilling style when, after beating Conference Champions Burton Albion on the final day of the season, Torquay qualified for the Play-off Semi-finals in which they beat Histon 2–1 on aggregate over two legs. The result meant the Gulls would make their second visit to Wembley in two seasons. However, unlike the previous season, the Torquay fans were treated to a 2–0 victory over Cambridge United thanks to goals from Chris Hargreaves and leading scorer Tim Sills. The win secured Torquay United's return to the Football League after a two-year absence.

== League statistics ==
=== Conference National ===
Pos	Team	Pld	W	D	L	GF	GA	GD	Pts	Promotion, qualification or relegation
2	Cambridge United	46	24	14	8	65	39	+26	86	Qualification for the Conference Premier play-offs
3	Histon	46	23	14	9	78	48	+30	83	Qualification for the Conference Premier play-offs
4	Torquay United (O, P)	46	23	14	9	72	47	+25	83	Qualification for the Conference Premier play-offs
5	Stevenage Borough	46	23	12	11	73	54	+19	81	Qualification for the Conference Premier play-offs
6	Kidderminster Harriers	46	23	10	13	69	48	+21	79	

Source: Football Conference
Rules for classification: 1) points; 2) goal difference; 3) number of goals scored.
(O) Play-off winners; (P) Promoted

==== Results summary ====
Overall								Home						Away					
Pld	W	D	L	GF	GA	GD	Pts	W	D	L	GF	GA	GD	W	D	L	GF	GA	GD
46	23	14	9	72	47	+25	83	11	7	5	38	23	+15	12	7	4	34	24	+10

Source: Torquay United

==== Results by round ====
Round	1	2	3	4	5	6	7	8	9	10	11	12	13	14	15	16	17	18	19	20	21	22	23	24	25	26	27	28	29	30	31	32	33	34	35	36	37	38	39	40	41	42	43	44	45	46
Ground	A	H	H	A	H	H	A	H	A	H	A	A	H	H	A	A	H	A	H	A	H	A	H	A	H	H	A	H	H	A	H	A	A	H	A	H	A	H	A	H	A	H	A	A	A	H
Result	D	W	L	L	L	D	L	W	W	W	W	D	W	D	W	W	W	W	W	D	D	L	W	W	L	D	W	L	W	L	D	W	W	D	W	W	W	D	D	W	W	L	D	D	D	W
Position	11	5	14	17	20	18	18	18	17	15	11	11	8	8	7	5	2	2	1	3	3	4	3	2	5	3	4	6	5	6	5	5	5	5	4	3	3	3	3	3	2	3	3	4	5	4

Source: Torquay United
A = Away; H = Home; W = Win; D = Draw; L = Loss

== Season diary ==
- 1 July: Club record appearance holder Kevin Hill leaves to join Dorchester Town on a free transfer
- 14 July: Mustapha Carayol joins from Milton Keynes Dons on a two-year contract
- 18 July: Michael Poke re-joins on loan from Southampton
- 13 August: Martin Rice joins Truro City on loan until the end of the season
- 9 September: Roscoe Dsane and Michael Brough are made available for loan
- 25 September: Goalkeeper Scott Bevan joins on loan from Shrewsbury Town as cover for the injured Michael Poke (himself a loanee).
- 19 November: Torquay defender Chris Todd announces that he has been diagnosed with leukaemia
- 19 November: Torquay set a new club record number of games without defeat
- 3 December: Torquay's club record unbeaten run of 17 games ends with defeat away to Forest Green Rovers in the Conference League Cup
- 1 January: Scott Bevan joins on an 18-month contract from Shrewsbury Town
- 2 January: Tristan Plummer joins on loan from Bristol City until the end of the season
- 3 January: Torquay defeat Championship side Blackpool in the FA Cup 3rd round
- 14 January: Striker Tim Sills signs a new contract until the end of the 2009–10 season
- 20 January: Former striker Jamie Ward moves from Chesterfield to Sheffield United for an initial fee of £330,000, triggering a 25% sell-on clause
- 24 January: Torquay exit FA Cup after 1–0 defeat at home to Coventry City
- 31 January: Tristan Plummer ends his loan spell early and returns to Bristol City
- 31 January: Torquay exit FA Trophy after 3–0 defeat Away to Southport
- 2 February: Striker Iyseden Christie joins on a free transfer from Stevenage Borough, signing a contract until the end of the season
- 2 February: Defenders Chris Todd and Michael Brough join Salisbury City on a month's loan
- 4 March: Trainee Jordan Charran leaves the club
- 20 March: Chris Todd returns to the club after his loan spell at Salisbury City
- 27 March: Swindon Town Striker Blair Sturrock joins the club on loan until the end of the season
- 2 April: Defender Steve Woods leaves Torquay United after eight years and 281 appearances
- 9 April: Michael Brough returns after his loan deal with Salisbury City ends
- 26 April: In a tense final game of the season, Torquay beat Burton Albion 2–1 to finish fourth and secure a place in the Conference National play-offs. Despite Burton losing, the result is enough to crown them the Conference champions
- 27 April: Striker Roscoe Dsane leaves the club
- 4 May: Despite a 1–0 second leg defeat to Histon, Torquay win the Conference Play-offs 2–1 on aggregate to book a place in the Conference National play-off final at Wembley against Cambridge United.
- 17 May: Torquay Utd are promoted back to the Football League after beating Cambridge United 2–0 in front of a crowd of over 35,000 at Wembley
- 21 May: United celebrate their return to the Football League with a victory parade through the streets of Torquay.
- 22 May: Defender Kevin Nicholson signs a new one-year deal with the club.
- 1 Jun: Striker Iyseden Christie is released by the club.
- 2 Jun: Goalkeeper Martin Rice signs a new one-year contract after having spent the majority of the season on loan to Truro City.
- 16 Jun: Skipper Chris Hargreaves agrees a new one-year deal in a role involving both playing and coaching.
- 23 Jun: Striker Matt Green agrees a season long loan to Oxford Utd.

== Match of the season ==
CAMBRIDGE UNITED 0–2 TORQUAY UNITED
Conference National Play-off Final
Wembley Stadium, 17 May 2009

Torquay United's second trip to Wembley in two seasons was only made possible by the slenderest of margins. After having sneaked into the play-offs by beating Conference champions Burton Albion on the final day of the season, the Gulls only just managed to beat third placed Histon 2–1 on aggregate in the play-off semi-finals. They now faced the final hurdle preventing them from returning to the Football League after a two-year absence: a play-off final with the team who had finished second in the Conference, Cambridge United.

Cambridge had been defeated in the previous year's play-off final by Torquay's arch-rivals Exeter City (who had also knocked the Gulls out in the same year's semi final). As such, they were eager to make it second time lucky, although, having experienced defeat themselves in the previous year's FA Trophy Final at Wembley, the Gulls were also keen not to repeat the disappointment of the previous season. Although Cambridge began the brighter of the two sides, it was Torquay (wearing their white and blue away strip) who took the lead through captain Chris Hargreaves after 35 minutes. Cambridge had more chances in the second half, but their cause was hindered when defender Phil Bolland was sent off after a second yellow card for a tackle on Elliot Benyon in the 70th minute. Striker Tim Sills effectively sealed the victory five minutes later after he headed home a pin-point cross from winger Wayne Carlisle.

The score remained 2–0 until the final whistle, and Torquay United could finally celebrate their return to the Football League after two years in the Conference.

No.	Pos.	Name
1	GK	(England) Michael Poke
7	DF	(England) Lee Mansell
6	DF	(Wales) Chris Todd
5	DF	(Scotland) Chris Robertson
3	DF	(England) Kevin Nicholson
15	MF	(Northern Ireland) Wayne Carlisle (substituted off) 90+4'
11	MF	(England) Nicky Wroe
14	MF	(England) Chris Hargreaves 35'
19	MF	(England) Danny Stevens (substituted off) 84'
9	FW	(England) Elliot Benyon (substituted off) 86'
8	FW	(England) Tim Sills 75'
		Substitutes
12	MF	(England) Tyrone Thompson (substituted on) 86'
16	DF	(England) Lee Hodges (substituted on) 84'
17	FW	(England) Matt Green
18	MF	(The Gambia) Mustapha Carayol (substituted on) 90+4'
23	GK	(England) Martin Rice

== Results ==
=== Conference National ===
9 Aug 2008	Histon	1 – 1	Torquay United	Bridge Road
15:00 BST	Knight-Percival 89'	Report	Sills 55' (pen.)	Attendance: 928; Referee: Michael Naylor

12 Aug 2008	Torquay United	2 – 1	Woking	Plainmoor
19:45 BST	Benyon 60'; Carlisle 82'	Report	Sole 35'	Attendance: 2,881; Referee: J. Farries

18 Aug 2008	Torquay United	0 – 2	Ebbsfleet United	Plainmoor
19:45 BST		Report	Moore 26'; Akinde 78'	Attendance: 2,372; Referee: P. Melin

23 Aug 2008	Crawley Town	3 – 1	Torquay United	Broadfield Stadium
15:00 BST	Pittman 9'; Pinault 32' (pen.); Cook 77' (pen.)	Report	D'Sane 49'	Attendance: 1,154; Referee: Darren Sheldrake

25 Aug 2008	Torquay United	0 – 1	Salisbury City	Plainmoor
15:00 BST		Report	Griffin 90'	Attendance: 2,001; Referee: W. Barratt

28 Aug 2008	Torquay United	1 – 1	York City	Plainmoor
19:45 BST	Stevens 65'	Report	Sodje 87'	Attendance: 1,598; Referee: Brendan Malone

4 Sep 2008	Kidderminster Harriers	1 – 0	Torquay United	Aggborough
19:45 BST	Barnes-Homer 44'	Report		Attendance: 1,345; Referee: R. Lewis

7 Sep 2008	Torquay United	2 – 1	Northwich Victoria	Plainmoor
14:00 BST	Carlisle 10'; Sills 90' (pen.)	Report	Steele 53'	Attendance: 1,752; Referee: A. Sainsbury

13 Sep 2008	Cambridge United	0 – 1	Torquay United	Abbey Stadium
15:00 BST		Report	Carlisle 90'	Attendance: 4,041; Referee: A. Hendley

20 Sep 2008	Torquay United	2 – 0	Eastbourne Borough	Plainmoor
15:00 BST	Thompson 23'; Hargreaves 73'	Report		Attendance: 1,921; Referee: Steve Rushton

23 Sep 2008	Forest Green Rovers	1 – 2	Torquay United	The New Lawn
19:45 BST	Smith 45+4'	Report	Benyon 69'; Green 90+3'	Attendance: 1,022; Referee: Paul Tierney

27 Sep 2008	Wrexham	1 – 1	Torquay United	Racecourse Ground
15:00 BST	Brown 44'	Report	Sills 35'	Attendance: 2,897; Referee: G. Sutton

4 Oct 2008	Torquay United	3 – 0	Stevenage Borough	Plainmoor
15:00 BST	Robertson 67'; Sills 71'; Wroe 87'	Report		Attendance: 2,066; Referee: N. Kinseley

9 Oct 2008	Torquay United	1 – 1	Oxford United	Plainmoor
19:45 BST	Robertson 21'	Report	Trainer 89'	Attendance: 1,955; Referee: A. Sainsbury

12 Oct 2008	Rushden & Diamonds	1 – 3	Torquay United	Nene Park
15:00 BST	Panther (red card) 52'; Smith 68'	Report	Carlisle 7'; Sills 15'; Wroe 51'; Green (red card) 54'	Attendance: 1,649; Referee: Ian Cooper

18 Oct 2008	Ebbsfleet United	0 – 2	Torquay United	Stonebridge Road
15:00 BST		Report	Wroe 42'; Carlisle 55'	Attendance: 1,781; Referee: R. Lee

1 Nov 2008	Torquay United	2 – 0	Mansfield Town	Plainmoor
15:00 GMT	D'Sane 54'; Woods 69'	Report		Attendance: 2,267; Referee: Brendan Malone

15 Nov 2008	York City	1 – 2	Torquay United	Bootham Crescent
15:00 GMT	Greaves 85'	Report	D'Sane 68'; Ellis 90+1'	Attendance: 2,412; Referee: P. Curry

18 Nov 2008	Torquay United	4 – 1	Lewes	Plainmoor
19:45 GMT	Sills 2' 45'; Stevens 28' 48'	Report	Taylor 52'	Attendance: 2,118; Referee: A. Sainsbury

22 Nov 2008	Woking	2 – 2	Torquay United	Kingfield Stadium
15:00 GMT	Enver-Marum 6'; Vernazza 22'	Report	Benyon 55'; Stevens 65'	Attendance: 2,452; Referee: D. Ford

6 Dec 2008	Torquay United	0 – 0	Cambridge United	Plainmoor
15:00 GMT		Report		Attendance: 2,310; Referee: R. Merchant

9 Dec 2008	Eastbourne Borough	4 – 2	Torquay United	Priory Lane
19:45 GMT	Barnes 8'; Crabb 51' 56'; Smith 71'	Report	Benyon 34' 90+1'	Attendance: 1,204; Referee: R. Whitton

20 Dec 2008	Torquay United	4 – 1	Histon	Plainmoor
15:00 GMT	D'Sane 7' 22'; Wroe 62'; Sills 85'	Report	Wright 49'	Attendance: 2,201; Referee: R. Lee

26 Dec 2008	Weymouth	0 – 1	Torquay United	Wessex Stadium
15:00 GMT		Report	Green 24'	Attendance: 2,323; Referee: Steve Creighton

28 Dec 2008	Torquay United	0 – 1	Kidderminster Harriers	Plainmoor
15:00 GMT		Report	Riley 73'	Attendance: 2,749; Referee: Simon Beck

16 Jan 2009	Torquay United	1 – 1	Wrexham	Plainmoor
19:45 GMT	D'Sane 61'	Report	Flynn 31'	Attendance: 1,842; Referee: Darren Sheldrake

27 Jan 2009	Lewes	0 – 2	Torquay United	The Dripping Pan
19:45 GMT		Report	Nicholson 44'; D'Sane 84'	Attendance: 558; Referee: R. Whitton

10 Feb 2009	Torquay United	0 – 2	Weymouth	Plainmoor
19:45 GMT		Report	Williams 45+1'; Beavon 88'	Attendance: 1,743; Referee: A. Hendley

14 Feb 2009	Torquay United	3 – 1	Altrincham	Plainmoor
15:00 GMT	Sills 19' 55' (pen.); Benyon 76'	Report	Doughty 87'	Attendance: 1,760; Referee: M. McLaughlin

21 Feb 2009	Kettering Town	2 – 1	Torquay United	Rockingham Road
15:00 GMT	Marna 9'; Seddon 12' (pen.)	Report	Nicholson 45+2'	Attendance: 1,869; Referee: Jock Waugh

24 Feb 2009	Torquay United	3 – 3	Forest Green Rovers	Plainmoor
15:00 GMT	Green 18'; Hargreaves 45+3'; Christie 80'	Report	Mangan 28' (pen.) 36' 42'	Attendance: 1,554; Referee: Steve Creighton

28 Feb 2009	Oxford United	0 – 2	Torquay United	Kassam Stadium
19:45 GMT	Nelthorpe (red card) 33'	Report	D'Sane (red card) 59'; Benyon 64' 70'	Attendance: 5,837; Referee: Simon Beck

3 Mar 2009	Grays Athletic	1 – 2	Torquay United	New Recreation Ground
19:45 GMT	Dinning 26'	Report	Nicholson 13'; Carlisle 87'	Attendance: 510; Referee: D. Ford

7 Mar 2009	Torquay United	1 – 1	Rushden & Diamonds	Plainmoor
15:00 GMT	Sills 41'	Report	Tomlin 65'	Attendance: 2,161; Referee: K. Johnson

10 Mar 2009	Altrincham	0 – 1	Torquay United	Moss Lane
19:45 GMT		Report	Carlisle 90+2'	Attendance: 735; Referee: J. Adcock

14 Mar 2009	Torquay United	4 – 1	Barrow	Plainmoor
15:00 GMT	Wroe 4'; Benyon 39'; Sills 68'; Green 90'	Report	Brown 12'; Walker (red card) 90+2'	Attendance: 2,269; Referee: Ian Cooper

21 Mar 2009	Northwich Victoria	2 – 3	Torquay United	Victoria Stadium
15:00 GMT	Perry 34'; Allan 56'	Report	Todd 49'; Sills 68'; D'Sane 76'	Attendance: 705; Referee: Steve Rushton

24 Mar 2009	Torquay United	1 – 1	Grays Athletic	Plainmoor
19:45 GMT	D'Sane 48'	Report	Taylor 39'	Attendance: 1,996; Referee: Brendan Malone

28 Mar 2009	Mansfield Town	1 – 1	Torquay United	Field Mill
15:00 GMT	Duffy 36'	Report	Sturrock 64'	Attendance: 2,437; Referee: Paul Tierney

4 Apr 2009	Torquay United	2 – 0	Kettering Town	Plainmoor
15:00 BST	Robertson 20'; Sturrock 65'	Report		Attendance: 2,503; Referee: P. Melin

6 Apr 2009	Burton Albion	0 – 1	Torquay United	Pirelli Stadium
19:45 BST	Pearson (red card) 36'	Report	Stevens 10'	Attendance: 4,891; Referee: Jock Waugh

11 Apr 2009	Torquay United	0 – 2	Crawley Town	Plainmoor
15:00 BST		Report	Bulman 38'; Matthews 90+2'	Attendance: 3,031; Referee: Brendan Malone

13 Apr 2009	Salisbury City	2 – 2	Torquay United	Raymond McEnhill Stadium
15:00 BST	Griffin 45+3'; Ademeno 81'	Report	Carlisle 20' (pen.); Brough (red card) 84'; Wroe 90+1'	Attendance: 2,039; Referee: J. Hopkins

18 Apr 2009	Stevenage Borough	0 – 0	Torquay United	Broadhall Way
15:00 BST		Report	Mansell (red card) 64'	Attendance: 2,819; Referee: A. Hendley

21 Apr 2009	Barrow	1 – 1	Torquay United	Holker Street
19:45 BST	Walker 12'	Report	Hargreaves 49'	Attendance: 1,918; Referee: R. West

26 Apr 2009	Torquay United	2 – 1	Burton Albion	Plainmoor
15:00 BST	Hargreaves 13'; Benyon 46'	Report	Goodfellow 8'	Attendance: 4,528; Referee: Paul Tierney

=== Conference National play-offs ===
1 May 2009 Semi-final 1st Leg	Torquay United	2 – 0	Histon	Plainmoor
20:00 BST	Wroe 36'; Sills 74'	Report		Attendance: 3,737; Referee: Jock Waugh

4 May 2009 Semi-final 2nd Leg	Histon	1 – 0	Torquay United	Bridge Road
17:30 BST	Andrews 16'	Report		Attendance: 2,481; Referee: Steve Rushton

17 May 2009 Final	Cambridge United	0 – 2	Torquay United	Wembley Stadium
16:00 BST	Bolland (red card) 70'	Report	Hargreaves 35'; Sills 75'	Attendance: 35,089; Referee: Gary Sutton

=== FA Cup ===
25 Oct 2008 Fourth round qualifying	Torquay United	4 – 1	Chipstead	Plainmoor
15:00 BST	Thompson 9' 40'; Sills 87' 88'	Report	Coleman 68'	Attendance: 1,800

8 Nov 2008 First round	Torquay United	2 – 0	Evesham United	Plainmoor
15:00 GMT	Sills 28' 75'	Report		Attendance: 2,275; Referee: Darren Sheldrake

29 Nov 2008 Second round	Torquay United	2 – 0	Oxford United	Plainmoor
15:00 GMT	Benyon 41' 83'; D'Sane (red card) 45+1'	Report		Attendance: 2,647; Referee: R. East

3 Jan 2009 Third round	Torquay United	1 – 0	Blackpool	Plainmoor
15:00 GMT	Green 32'	Report		Attendance: 3,654; Referee: Andy Penn

24 Jan 2009 Fourth round	Torquay United	0 – 1	Coventry City	Plainmoor
15:00 GMT		Report	Ward 87'	Attendance: 6,018; Referee: K. Friend

=== FA Trophy ===
13 Dec 2008 First round	Torquay United	2 – 0	Bath City	Plainmoor
15:00 GMT	Mansell; D'Sane	Report		Attendance: 1,176

10 Jan 2009 Second round	Torquay United	1 – 0	Rushden & Diamonds	Plainmoor
15:00 GMT	Hargreaves	Report		Attendance: 1,728

31 Jan 2009 Third round	Southport	3 – 0	Torquay United	Haig Avenue
15:00 GMT	Daly 13' 75'; Lee 81'	Report		Attendance: 980; Referee: R. West

=== Conference League Cup ===
4 Nov 2008 Third round	Weymouth	0 – 3	Torquay United	Wessex Stadium
19:45 GMT			Sills; Benyon	Attendance: 621

2 Dec 2008 Fourth round	Forest Green Rovers	1 – 0	Torquay United	The New Lawn
19:45 GMT	Symonds	Report		Attendance: 421

=== Friendlies ===
15 Jul 2008	Newton Abbot	0 – 7	Torquay United	Coach Road
		Report

19 Jul 2008	Torquay United	1 – 1	Bristol Rovers	Plainmoor
15:00 BST

26 Jul 2008	Torquay United	0 – 1	Chelsea	Plainmoor
15:00 BST		Report	Stoch 37'	Attendance: 1,963

==== South West Challenge Cup ====
22 Jul 2008	Bideford	0 – 2	Torquay United	Bideford Sports Ground
19:00 BST		Report	Carayol; Thompson	Attendance: 550

24 Jul 2008	Eastleigh	0 – 0 (3 – 2 p)	Torquay United	Bideford Sports Ground
19:00 BST		Report

26 Jul 2008 Semi-final	Yeovil Town	1 – 1 (3 – 5 p)	Torquay United	Mill Road, Barnstaple
20:00 BST	Schofield	Report	Benyon
	Penalties
	Murtagh (penalty scored); Schofield (penalty missed); Owusu (penalty scored); Wagenaar (penalty scored)		D'Sane (penalty scored); Adams (penalty scored); Nicholson (penalty scored); Robertson (penalty scored); Rice (penalty scored)

28 Jul 2008 Final	Torquay United	2 – 2 (2 – 3 p)	Eastleigh	Bideford Sports Ground
20:00 BST	Yeoman 83'; Carayol 84'	Report	Adeniyi 39' (pen.); Harris 70'

=== Devon St Luke's Bowl ===
25 Feb 2009 Second round	Cullompton Rangers	0 – 2	Torquay United	Speed's Meadow
19:45 GMT		Report	Stevens 39' 88'	Referee: Marc Whaley

21 Apr 2009 Quarter Final	Elmore	1 – 0	Torquay United	Horsdon Park
19:45 BST	Goal	[ Report]		Referee: Andrew Rodda

== Club statistics ==
=== First team appearances ===
No.	Pos.	Name	Conference National		Conference National play-offs		FA Cup		FA Trophy		Conference League Cup		Total ^{[4]}		Discipline
No.	Pos.	Name	Apps	Goals	Apps	Goals	Apps	Goals	Apps	Goals	Apps	Goals	Apps	Goals
1	GK	(England) Michael Poke	12 (1)	0	3	0	0	0	0	0	1	0	15 (1)	0	0	0
2	DF	(England) Michael Brough	2 (1)	0	0	0	0	0	0	0	1	0	2 (1)	0	2	1
3	DF	(England) Kevin Nicholson	38 (2)	3	3	0	5	0	3	0	2	0	48 (2)	3	0	0
4	DF	(England) Steve Woods	27	1	0	0	5	0	3	0	1	0	34	1	2	0
5	DF	(Scotland) Chris Robertson	27 (3)	3	3	0	0	0	0	0	1	0	30 (3)	3	2	0
6	DF	(Wales) Chris Todd	16	1	3	0	0	0	0	0	1	0	20	1	0	0
7	MF	(England) Lee Mansell	41 (1)	0	3	0	5	0	3	1	2	0	51 (1)	1	4	1
8	FW	(England) Tim Sills	43 (2)	13	3	2	5	4	2	0	1	2	52 (2)	17	8	0
9	FW	(England) Elliot Benyon	17 (17)	10	1 (1)	0	0 (5)	2	0 (2)	0	1 (1)	1	18 (24)	12	3	0
10	FW	(England) Roscoe D'Sane	22 (5)	9	0	0	5	0	3	1	1	0	29 (5)	10	2	2
11	MF	(England) Nicky Wroe	40	6	3	1	5	0	3	0	1 (1)	0	50	7	6	0
12	MF	(England) Tyrone Thompson	17 (6)	1	0 (1)	0	3 (1)	2	1 (1)	0	1 (1)	0	20 (9)	1	4	0
14	MF	(England) Chris Hargreaves	44	4	3	1	5	0	3	1	1	0	54	6	10	0
15	MF	(Northern Ireland) Wayne Carlisle	34 (3)	8	3	0	5	0	2	0	0	0	44 (3)	8	2	0
16	DF	(England) Lee Hodges	31 (4)	0	0 (2)	0	5	0	3	0	1	0	38 (6)	0	1	0
17	FW	(England) Matt Green	15 (14)	4	0	0	2 (1)	1	2 (1)	0	1 (1)	0	20 (17)	5	2	1
18	MF	(The Gambia) Mustapha Carayol	14 (16)	0	0 (1)	0	3 (1)	0	0 (1)	0	2	0	16 (19)	0	1	0
19	MF	(England) Danny Stevens	15 (14)	5	3	0	0 (2)	0	0 (2)	0	1 (1)	0	18 (18)	5	1	0
20	GK	(England) Scott Bevan	34	0	0	0	5	0	3	0	1	0	41	0	0	0
21	FW	(England) Iyseden Christie	2 (4)	1	0	0	0	0	0	0	0	0	2 (4)	1	0	0
22	FW	(England) Ashley Yeoman	0 (1)	0	0	0	0	0	0	0	0	0	0 (1)	0	0	0
23	GK	(England) Martin Rice	0	0	0	0	0	0	0	0	0	0	0	0	0	0
24	MF	(England) Steve Adams	1 (2)	0	0	0	0	0	1	0	1	0	2 (2)	0	0	0
25	DF	(England) Mark Ellis	8 (1)	1	0	0	0	0	0	0	1	0	8 (1)	1	2	0
28	FW	(England) Jordan Charran	0 (1)	0	0	0	0 (1)	0	0	0	0 (1)	0	0 (1)	0	0	0
32	FW	(England) Tristan Plummer	0	0	0	0	0	0	1	0	0	0	1	0	0	0
33	FW	(Scotland) Blair Sturrock	6 (1)	2	2	0	0	0	0	0	0	0	8 (1)	2	1	0

Source: Torquay United, soccerbase
Substitute appearances in brackets.
^{4} Total excludes FA Cup qualifying round and Conference League Cup.

=== Transfers ===
==== In ====
Date	Pos.	Name	From	Fee
14 July 2008	MF	Mustapha Carayol	Milton Keynes Dons	Undisclosed
1 January 2009	GK	Scott Bevan	Shrewsbury Town	Free
2 February 2009	FW	Iyseden Christie	Stevenage Borough	Free

==== Out ====
Date	Pos.	Name	To	Fee
1 July 2009	MF	Kevin Hill	Dorchester Town	Free
4 March 2009	FW	Jordan Charran	Released	Free
2 April 2009	DF	Steve Woods	Stalybridge Celtic	Free
27 April 2009	FW	Roscoe D'Sane	Released	Free
1 June 2009	FW	Iyseden Christie	Tamworth	Free

==== Loans in ====
Date	Pos.	Name	From	Expiry date
18 July 2008	GK	Michael Poke	Southampton	May 2009
25 September 2008	GK	Scott Bevan	Shrewsbury Town	1 January 2009
2 January 2009	FW	Tristan Plummer	Bristol City	31 January 2009
27 March 2009	FW	Blair Sturrock	Swindon Town	May 2009

==== Loans out ====
Date	Pos.	Name	To	Expiry date
13 August 2008	GK	Martin Rice	Truro City	May 2009
2 February 2009	DF	Chris Todd	Salisbury City	20 March 2009
2 February 2009	DF	Michael Brough	Salisbury City	9 April 2009
23 June 2009	FW	Matt Green	Oxford United	May 2010
