= Chris Robertson (footballer, born 1986) =

Scottish footballer

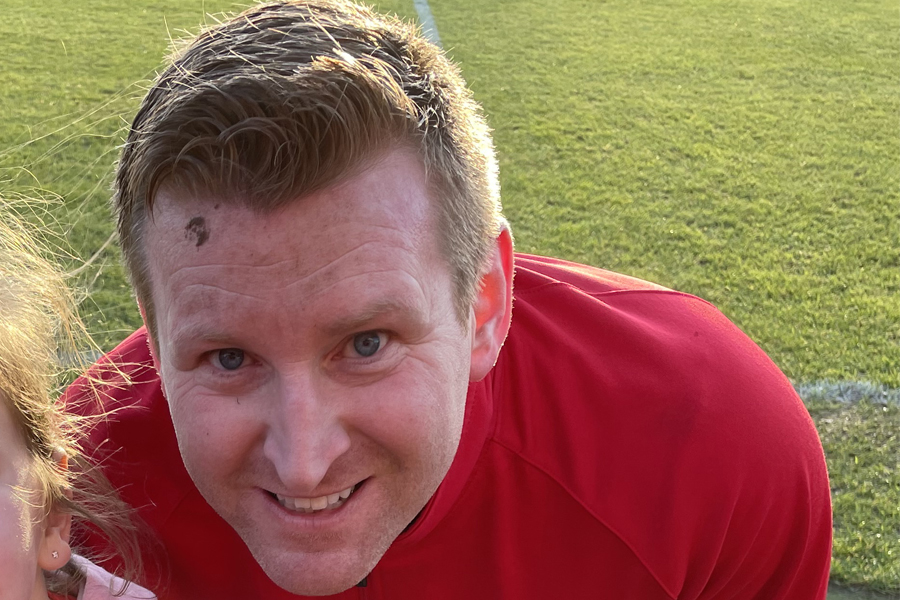
- Robertson with Coalville Town in January 2023

Personal information
- Full name: Christopher Robertson
- Date of birth: 11 October 1986 (age 40)
- Place of birth: Dundee, Scotland
- Height: 1.91 m (6 ft 3 in)
- Positions: Centre-back; right-back

Youth career
- 2004–2005: Sheffield United

Senior career*
Years	Team	Apps	(Gls)
2005–2007	Sheffield United	0	(0)
2004	→ Leigh RMI (loan)	5	(0)
2006	→ Chester City (loan)	1	(0)
2007–2012	Torquay United	179	(11)
2012–2013	Preston North End	39	(1)
2013–2015	Port Vale	61	(3)
2015–2016	Ross County	23	(0)
2016–2017	AFC Wimbledon	13	(1)
2017–2019	Swindon Town	18	(1)
2019	→ Havant & Waterlooville (loan)	2	(0)
2019–2020	Ilkeston Town		
2020	Grantham Town	8	(1)
2020–2024	Coalville Town	77	(3)
2023	→ Quorn (loan)	7	(0)
Total		440	(21)
- * Club domestic league appearances and goals

Christopher Robertson (born 11 October 1986) is a Scottish former professional footballer played as a defender.

Robertson turned professional at Sheffield United in July 2005 but was released by the club after two brief loan spells at Leigh RMI and Chester City. He joined Torquay United in March 2007. He went on to spend five years with the club, helping them to win the 2009 Conference play-off final. He was sold to Preston North End for an undisclosed fee in January 2012 but left the club at the end of the 2012–13 season after losing his first-team place. He signed with Port Vale in June 2013. He returned to his native Scotland with Ross County in June 2015 before signing with AFC Wimbledon in September 2016. He joined Swindon Town in June 2017 and was released in May 2019 after being loaned out to Havant & Waterlooville earlier in the year. He joined Ilkeston Town in September 2019 and moved on to Grantham Town four months later. He joined Coalville Town in the summer of 2020. He played on loan for Quorn in 2023.

== Career ==
=== Sheffield United ===
Robertson was born in Dundee but moved to Nottingham with his family at the age of two. He joined Sheffield United as a trainee before he signed professional forms with the "Blades" in July 2005. Before this, manager Neil Warnock sent Robertson to join Leigh RMI of the Conference on loan in the 2004–05 season, and he went on to make five appearances for the "Leythers" under the management of Phil Starbuck. Robertson joined League Two side Chester City on loan on 1 February 2006, making his league debut as a half-time substitute for Mark Roberts in a 5–0 defeat to Carlisle United at Brunton Park three days later. However, Chester manager Keith Curle cancelled his loan spell after a week, along with the loan spells of Wayne Corden, Mark Roberts, and Evan Horwood.

=== Torquay United ===
In March 2007, Robertson joined Torquay United on non-contract terms, rejoining manager Keith Curle who had signed him on loan while manager of Chester City. He scored on his "Gulls" debut, volleying in the third goal in a 3–0 win over Wycombe Wanderers at Plainmoor on 10 March. He made a further eight League Two appearances in the 2006–07 relegation season. He signed a full contract with Torquay in June 2007. He played 28 games in the 2007–08 campaign, and was an unused substitute in the 2008 FA Trophy final, as Torquay lost 1–0 to Ebbsfleet United at Wembley Stadium. He was transfer-listed by manager Paul Buckle in June 2008, but forced his way back into the first-team after Torquay made a bad start to the 2008–09 season. He played 32 games despite missing a three-month period recovering from surgery after he ruptured the main supporting ligament in his ankle. After forming a solid partnership with Chris Todd at the heart of defence, Torquay were promoted back to the Football League after beating Cambridge United 2–0 in the Conference National play-off final at Wembley.

Robertson was linked to a move to Burton Albion in summer 2009, but instead signed a one-year contract after protracted negotiations. He played 50 matches in the 2009–10 season, and signed a two-year contract as United finished comfortably in mid-table. A club record run of ten clean sheets was ended after 998 minutes without a goal four matches into the 2010–11 season. United reached the play-off final, but lost 1–0 to Stevenage at Old Trafford. An ever-present in the back four in the 2011–12 campaign by the January transfer window, Robertson began to attract the interest of other clubs as manager Martin Ling struggled to find the money to compete with other interested parties. At the time of his departure Torquay were aiming for automatic promotion after a lengthy series of victories. In his absence the club finished fifth, and lost to Cheltenham Town in the play-off semi-finals.

=== Preston North End ===
In January 2012, Robertson signed a two-and-a-half-year deal with League One side Preston North End for an undisclosed transfer fee (later reported to be £60,000). He scored his first goal for the club on 14 April against Huddersfield Town, and after the game was praised by manager Graham Westley for his application and character. Due to the form of summer signings Paul Huntington and Shane Cansdell-Sherriff, Robertson had to wait until 14 October for his first league appearance of the 2012–13 season, when he put in a "terrific display" and again earned praise from Westley for his hard work and professionalism. He was limited to a total of 24 league starts over the course of the campaign, and decided to leave the club after failing to play at Deepdale under new boss Simon Grayson.

=== Port Vale ===
He signed with newly promoted League One club Port Vale in June 2013. Upon securing him to a two-year contract, manager Micky Adams noted that Robertson had experience of League One football and had made a good impression on him during his time at Torquay. He opened the 2013–14 season in a centre-back partnership with Carl Dickinson. On 1 April, he was sent off during a 2–1 win over Crawley Town after the referee mistakenly thought he had made a tackle from behind, when in fact the culprit was club captain Doug Loft. He ended the campaign with 44 appearances to his name, but said that he was not taking his future at the club for granted despite being one of only a few players contracted until 2015.

At the start of the 2014–15 season he fell down the first-team pecking order behind Richard Duffy, Ryan McGivern, Stéphane Zubar and Remie Streete, and was told by new manager Rob Page that he must go out on loan to find first-team football. He said the club told him to leave for financial reasons and that "He [Page] explained to me that I was part of his plans, as long as he is here. Then, a week later, he started signing centre-halves and loan players. I didn't really know what was going on." He was released in May 2015.

=== Ross County ===
Robertson signed for Scottish Premiership club Ross County in June 2015. In making the move he turned down better financial offers from lower league English clubs. He broke his hand in pre-season and started the 2015–16 season on the bench. He was an unused substitute in the Scottish League Cup final at Hampden Park, as the "Staggies" won the Scottish League Cup for the first time in their history. His contract was terminated by mutual consent in August 2016.

=== AFC Wimbledon ===
Robertson returned to League One in September 2016 after signing with AFC Wimbledon. He joined the club to move his pregnant wife closer to family. An injury to Darius Charles allowed him to form a centre-back partnership with Paul Robinson. He scored his first goal for the "Dons" in a 4–0 win over former club Port Vale at the Kingsmeadow on 17 December. However, he was limited to just 19 appearances throughout the 2016–17 campaign, and manager Neal Ardley decided to release Robertson in May 2017 to allow a path to the first-team for youngster Will Nightingale.

=== Swindon Town ===
He signed with newly relegated EFL League Two club Swindon Town in June 2017; manager David Flitcroft stated that Robertson was a "solid character" and had "the profile of a centre-half that I was looking for". On 8 August 2017, he made his debut for Swindon during their EFL Cup first round tie against Championship side Norwich City, featuring for the full 90 minutes in the 3–2 defeat. Following a spell in the starting eleven, Robertson scored his first Swindon goal during their 2–1 away defeat against Chesterfield. He acted mainly as a back-up to Dion Conroy / Matt Preston and Olly Lancashire and ended the 2017–18 campaign with 22 appearances for the "Robins", having picked up an injury in mid-March.

He spent the opening months of the 2018–19 season sidelined after suffering a stress fracture injury in his ankle during pre-season training. On 16 January 2019, he joined National League club Havant & Waterlooville on a one-month loan to gain match fitness. However, he did not feature again for Havant or Swindon after being sent off in his second appearance for the "Hawks". Swindon released him at the end of the 2018–19 season.

=== Later career ===
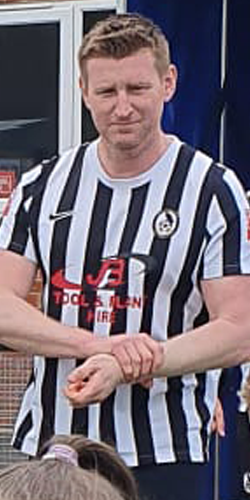
Robertson playing for Coalville Town in April 2022.

On 4 September 2019, Robertson joined Ilkeston Town of the Northern Premier League Division One South East, stating that the club was close to his home and young family. He moved on to Northern Premier League Premier Division side Grantham Town in January 2020. As a result of the COVID-19 pandemic in England, the 2019–20 season was formally abandoned on 26 March, with all results from the season being expunged. He joined Coalville Town in the Southern League Premier Division Central for the start of the 2020–21 season. He made 11 appearances, scoring one goal, before the Southern League season was curtailed early due to the ongoing pandemic. He played 35 games in the 2021–22 campaign, including the play-off final defeat to Peterborough Sports. He made fifty appearances across the course of the 2022–23 season, though was an unused substitute in the play-off semi-final defeat to Rushall Olympic. He joined Northern Premier League Division One Midlands club Quorn on loan in October 2023. He played seven eight games in the 2023–24 season, receiving one red card.

== Career statistics ==
Appearances and goals by club, season and competition
Club	Season	League			National Cup (Note: Includes FA Cup, Scottish Cup)		League Cup (Note: Includes League Cup / EFL Cup, Scottish League Cup)		Other		Total	
Club	Season	Division	Apps	Goals	Apps	Goals	Apps	Goals	Apps	Goals	Apps	Goals
Sheffield United	2005–06	Championship	0	0	0	0	0	0	—		0	0
Sheffield United	2006–07	Premier League	0	0	0	0	0	0	—		0	0
Sheffield United	Total		0	0	0	0	0	0	0	0	0	0
Leigh RMI (loan)	2004–05	Conference National	5	0	0	0	—		0	0	5	0
Chester City (loan)	2005–06	League Two	1	0	—		—		—		1	0
Torquay United	2006–07	League Two	9	1	—		—		—		9	1
Torquay United	2007–08	Conference National	25	2	2	0	—		1 (Note: Appearance(s) in the FA Trophy.)	0	28	2
Torquay United	2008–09	Conference National	32	3	0	0	—		0	0	32	3
Torquay United	2009–10	League Two	45	2	2	0	1	0	2 (Note: 1 appearance in the Football League Trophy and 1 appearance in the play-offs.)	0	50	2
Torquay United	2010–11	League Two	43	2	4	0	1	0	5 (Note: Appearance(s) in the Football League Trophy / EFL Trophy.)	0	53	2
Torquay United	2011–12	League Two	25	1	1	0	1	0	0	0	27	1
Torquay United	Total		179	11	9	0	3	0	8	0	199	11
Preston North End	2011–12	League One	18	1	—		—		—		18	1
Preston North End	2012–13	League One	21	0	3	1	1	0	3	0	28	1
Preston North End	Total		39	1	3	1	1	0	3	0	46	2
Port Vale	2013–14	League One	37	3	5	2	1	1	2	0	45	6
Port Vale	2014–15	League One	24	0	0	0	2	0	0	0	26	0
Port Vale	Total		61	3	5	2	3	1	2	0	71	6
Ross County	2015–16	Scottish Premiership	23	0	1	0	2	0	—		26	0
Ross County	2016–17	Scottish Premiership	0	0	0	0	3	0	—		3	0
Ross County	Total		23	0	1	0	5	0	0	0	29	0
AFC Wimbledon	2016–17	League One	13	1	4	0	—		2	0	19	1
Swindon Town	2017–18	League Two	18	1	0	0	1	0	3	0	22	1
Swindon Town	2018–19	League Two	0	0	0	0	0	0	0	0	0	0
Swindon Town	Total		18	1	0	0	1	0	3	0	22	1
Havant & Waterlooville (loan)	2018–19	National League	2	0	0	0	—		0	0	2	0
Grantham Town	2019–20	Northern Premier League; Premier Division	8	1	0	0	—		0	0	8	1
Coalville Town	2020–21	Southern League; Premier Division Central	7	1	3	0	—		1	0	11	1
Coalville Town	2021–22	Southern League; Premier Division Central	31	1	1	0	—		3 (Note: 1 appearance in the FA Trophy and 2 appearances in the play-offs)	0	35	1
Coalville Town	2022–23	Southern League; Premier Division Central	39	1	6	0	—		5	0	50	1
Coalville Town	2023–24	Southern League; Premier Division Central	0	0	0	0	—		0	0	0	0
Coalville Town	Total		77	3	10	0	0	0	9	0	96	3
Quorn (loan)	2023–24	Northern Premier League; Division One Midlands	7	0	0	0	—		1	0	8	0
Career total (Note: Statistics for Ilkeston Town not recorded.)			433	21	32	3	13	1	28	0	506	25

== Honours ==
Torquay United

- Conference National play-offs: 2009

Ross County

- Scottish League Cup: 2015–16
