= Tyrone Thompson (footballer) =

Professional footballer (born 1982)

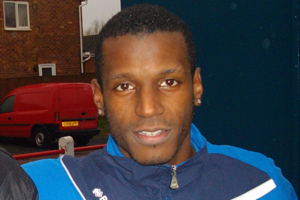

Personal information
- Full name: Tyrone I'Yungo Thompson
- Date of birth: 8 May 1982 (age 44)
- Place of birth: Sheffield, England
- Positions: Midfielder; striker

Youth career
- Sheffield United

Senior career*
Years	Team	Apps	(Gls)
2000–2003	Sheffield United	0	(0)
2002	→ Lincoln City (loan)	1	(0)
2003	→ Doncaster Rovers (loan)	1	(0)
2003–2004	Huddersfield Town	2	(0)
2004–2005	Scarborough	43	(2)
2005–2007	Halifax Town	79	(1)
2007–2008	Crawley Town	44	(4)
2008–2010	Torquay United	47	(1)
2010–2011	Mansfield Town	27	(2)
2011	Grimsby Town	3	(1)
2011	FC Halifax Town	2	(0)
2011–2012	Lincoln City	26	(1)
2012–2013	Sheffield	7	(0)
2013	Gainsborough Trinity	10	(0)
2014	Goole		
Total		292	(12)
- * Club domestic league appearances and goals

Tyrone I'Yungo Thompson (born 8 May 1982) is an English football coach and former professional footballer.

As a player he was a midfielder from 2000 to 2014. He played for Sheffield United, Lincoln City, Doncaster Rovers, Huddersfield Town, Scarborough, Halifax Town, Crawley Town, Torquay United, Mansfield Town, Grimsby Town, FC Halifax Town, Sheffield, Gainsborough Trinity and Goole.

== Playing career ==
=== Sheffield United ===
Thompson attended King Edward VII School in Sheffield and joined Sheffield United's Centre of Excellence at the age of nine. He progressed to being a trainee with United and turned professional in July 2000. He made his first team debut on 22 August 2000 as United beat Lincoln City 6–1 in a first round first leg League Cup tie, Thompson replacing David Kelly as a 73rd-minute substitute. He started the second leg, a 1–0 away defeat for United.

Unable to establish himself in the first team, Thompson joined Lincoln City on loan in October 2002, making his debut in a 4–3 Football League Trophy win at home to York City on 22 October. He played two further games for Lincoln, a draw at home to Bury in the league and a defeat at home to Shrewsbury Town in the Football League Trophy, before returning to Sheffield United in November 2002. He played in the FA Cup fourth round, as United won 4–3 at home to Ipswich Town with a last minute winner from Paul Peschisolido, but this would be his final appearance for Sheffield United. In March 2003 he joined Doncaster Rovers on loan until the end of the season, but played just once in the Conference National for them, in a 1–1 draw at home to Morecambe. He was released by Sheffield United in May 2003.

=== Huddersfield Town ===
He moved to Huddersfield Town in July 2003, but made only two first team appearances, starting the 2–2 draw at home to Cambridge United on the opening day of the season and coming on as a second-half substitute for Andy Holdsworth in the 3–0 win at home to Northampton Town on 13 September.

=== Scarborough ===
A move to Scarborough followed in June 2004, where he was an ever-present the following season.

=== Halifax Town ===
He rejected a new contract with Scarborough in June 2005, joining Halifax Town on a monthly contract in August 2005. In October 2005 he signed a contract until the end of that season and was called up to the England semi-professional squad. He signed a further contract extension to the end of the following season in February 2006. In November 2006 he accused Northwich Victoria captain Stuart Elliott of racial abuse and an official complaint was lodged with The Football Association. Elliott was later cleared. Thompson was a first team regular but, despite the offer of new contract at Halifax, he failed to make contact with the West Yorkshire club and became a free agent at the end of the 2006–07 season.

=== Later career ===
It was later reported that he was a possible target for Halifax's Conference rivals York City, but joined Crawley Town on 27 June 2007. He was appointed as Crawley's captain, but was linked with a move to Forest Green Rovers in January 2008, with Crawley turning down a £15,000 bid.

Thompson signed for Torquay United on a two-year contract on 20 May 2008, despite having agreed a new contract with Crawley. His Torquay debut came on the opening day of the season, a 1–1 draw at home to Histon, and he quickly became a regular in Paul Buckle's side. His first Torquay goal came on 20 September as Torquay won 2–0 at home to Eastbourne Borough.

He was released by Torquay on 15 May 2010 along with six other players.

On 21 July 2010, Thompson signed with Conference National side Mansfield Town F.C. He was released on 12 May 2011.

On 18 August 2011 he joined Grimsby Town on non-contract basis. Following 3 games and 1 goal for The Mariners he was released from his short-term deal on 30 August 2011 with Grimsby stating that he had only been cover for the injured Anthony Church.

On 21 October 2011, he joined FC Halifax Town, the phoenix club of his former club Halifax Town. However, during his month at the club, he failed to impress and was released by manager Neil Aspin

On 18 November Thompson rejoined Lincoln City unit 8 January 2012. In January a further deal was agreed until the end of the season.

He joined Sheffield F.C. ahead of the 2012–13 season whose manager Curtis Woodhouse had played with Thompson at Sheffield United. Thompson debuted in the 6–2 Northern Premier League First Division South victory at Lincoln United on 18 August 2012, and made seven appearances for the club before joining Gainsborough Trinity in January 2013.

== Coaching career ==
At the end of January 2014, he resumed his connection with Curtis Woodhouse when having been appointed manager of Goole AFC, Woodhouse recruited Thompson to the role of player-coach. He debuted for the club in their Northern Premier League Division One South 1–0 defeat at Coalville Town on 1 February 2014.

== Personal life ==
Thompson now works as a FA Licensed Football Intermediary

== Career statistics ==
Appearances and goals by club, season and competition
Club	Season	League			FA Cup		League Cup		Other		Total	
Club	Season	Division	Apps	Goals	Apps	Goals	Apps	Goals	Apps	Goals	Apps	Goals
Sheffield United	2000–01 (Note: Soccerbase also credits Thompson with one league appearance, against Crewe Alexandra on 6 March 2001. However, Soccerbase's line-up for Sheffield United does not include a goalkeeper. The English National Football Archive's line-up for that match does include a goalkeeper, but does not include Thompson, and is considered more reliable.)	Division One	0	0	0	0	2	0	—		2	0
Sheffield United	2001–02	Division One	0	0	0	0	0	0	—		0	0
Sheffield United	2002–03	Division One	0	0	1	0	0	0	0	0	1	0
Sheffield United	Total		0	0	1	0	2	0	0	0	3	0
Lincoln City (loan)	2002–03	Division Three	1	0	0	0	0	0	2 (Note: Appearance(s) in Football League Trophy)	0	3	0
Doncaster Rovers (loan)	2002–03	Football Conference	1	0	0	0	—		0	0	1	0
Huddersfield Town	2003–04	Division Three	2	0	0	0	0	0	0	0	2	0
Scarborough	2004–05	Conference National	43	2	0	0	—		1	0	44	2
Halifax Town	2005–06	Conference National	41	1	2	0	—		6 (Note: Three appearances in Conference National play-offs; two appearances in Football League Trophy; one appearance in FA Trophy)	0	49	1
Halifax Town	2006–07	Conference National	38	0	0	0	—		0	0	38	0
Halifax Town	Total		79	1	2	0	—		6	0	87	1
Crawley Town	2007–08	Conference Premier	44	4	0	0	—		1 (Note: Appearance(s) in Conference League Cup)	0	45	4
Torquay United	2008–09	Conference Premier	23	1	3	0	—		2 (Note: One appearance in FA Trophy; one appearance in Conference Premier play-offs)	0	28	1
Torquay United	2009–10	League Two	24	0	2	0	1	0	2	0	29	0
Torquay United	Total		47	1	5	0	1	0	4	0	57	1
Mansfield Town	2010–11	Conference Premier	27	2	2	0	—		9 (Note: Appearance(s) in FA Trophy)	0	38	2
Grimsby Town	2011–12	Conference Premier	3	1	0	0	—		0	0	3	1
FC Halifax Town	2011–12	Conference North	2	0	1	0	—		0	0	3	0
Lincoln City	2011–12 (Note: Soccerbase incorrectly credits seven of Tyrone Thompson's league appearances to Curtis Thompson.)	Conference Premier	26	1	0	0	—		3	0	29	1
Sheffield	2012–13	Northern Premier League Division One South	7	0	0	0	—		0	0	7	0
Gainsborough Trinity	2012–13	Conference North	10	0	0	0	—		2	0	12	0
Career total			292	12	11	0	3	0	28	0	334	12
