= Roscoe Dsane =

English footballer (born 1980)

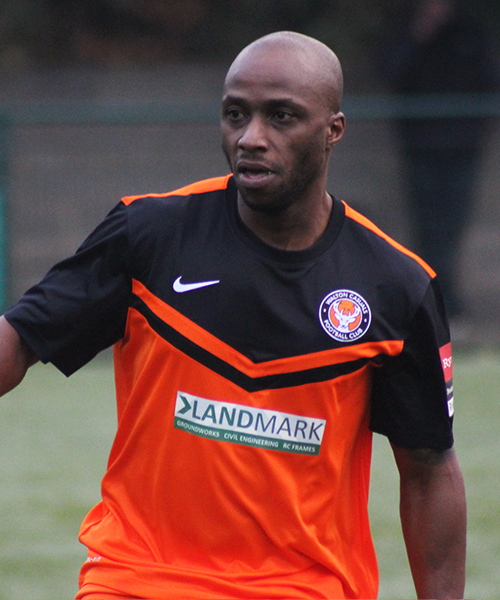
- Dsane playing for Walton Casuals in 2016

Personal information
- Full name: Roscoe Niiquaye Dsane
- Date of birth: 16 October 1980 (age 46)
- Place of birth: Epsom, England
- Position: Striker

Team information
- Current team: Walton Casuals

Youth career
- 1998–2001: Crystal Palace

Senior career*
Years	Team	Apps	(Gls)
2001–2002	Southend United	2	(0)
2002	Slough Town (loan)	2	(0)
2002	Woking	6	(1)
2002–2005	Aldershot Town	90	(41)
2006	Wealdstone	0	(0)
2006	Lewes	3	(1)
2006–2007	AFC Wimbledon	35	(17)
2007–2008	Accrington Stanley	22	(7)
2008–2009	Torquay United	46	(12)
2011	AFC Wimbledon	0	(0)
2011	Beaconsfield SYCOB (DR)	?	(?)
2011–	Merstham	?	(?)
2013–2016	Whyteleafe	?	(?)
2016–	Walton Casuals	9	(3)

International career^{‡}
2003–2004	England National Game XI	7	(4)
- * Club domestic league appearances and goals as of 1 January 2017 ‡ National team caps and goals as of 1 January 2017

Roscoe Niiquaye Dsane (born 16 October 1980) is an English professional footballer who last played for Isthmian Division One South side Walton Casuals as a striker.

A Crystal Palace youth product, Dsane made his professional debut for Southend United before spells at Slough Town and Woking in 2002. He joined Aldershot Town in May 2002 for a three-year stint, followed by moves to Wealdstone and Lewes. In July 2006, Dsane joined AFC Wimbledon and earned a move to Accrington Stanley a year later. In January 2008, he completed a move to Torquay United for an undisclosed fee. Following a year-long absence, Dsane returned to AFC Wimbledon in 2011, followed by moves to Merstham and Whyteleafe. He joined current club Walton Casuals in December 2016.

Dsane has represented England at semi-professional level, scoring four times for the National Game XI.

== Career ==
Born in Epsom, Dsane spent four years as a junior with Crystal Palace before joining Southend United in November 2001. He made his debut as a second-half substitute for Leon Johnson in Southend's 1–0 defeat at home to Plymouth Argyle and started the next game, a 2–0 defeat away to Shrewsbury Town. These were to be his only first team appearances for Southend and he moved to Slough Town on a free transfer and then to Woking in January 2002.

He moved to Aldershot Town in May 2002 and helped Aldershot to promotion to the Conference at the end of the following season. He scored 21 goals for Aldershot to help them to the playoff final in their first season in the Nationwide Conference in 2003–04. However, he lost his position after a knee injury, and was released by Aldershot in May 2005. He rejoined Aldershot after more than a year out injured and played for their reserve team in November 2005.

In March 2006, he joined Wealdstone, for a brief spell without appearing in their Isthmian League side, before joining AFC Wimbledon for the 2006–07 season. His 17 goals in the Isthmian Premier Division helped them reach the playoff semi-finals.

He was linked with a move to Torquay United, but on 18 June 2007, joined Accrington Stanley. He scored seven times in 22 league games for Stanley, but on 25 January 2008, signed for Torquay for an undisclosed fee. Dsane's contract was cancelled on the last day of the regular season.

In January 2011, after a year-long absence from football, Dsane began training with Conference National club AFC Wimbledon, before the club announcing he had signed for them on 2 February, beginning his second spell with them after his stint in the 2006–7 season. He was signed on a non-contract basis, allowing him to also register and play for Beaconsfield SYCOB of the Southern Football League Division One Central.

In August 2011, Dsane joined Merstham whose manager Andy Martin was a former teammate of D'Sane at Crystal Palace.

Dsane left Merstham to join his local side Whyteleafe in February 2013 scoring two goals on his debut against Lordswood, helping his new side gain promotion back to the Isthmian League in 2013–14.

In December 2016, Dsane joined Isthmian League Division One South side Walton Casuals.

== Statistics ==
Appearances and goals by club, season and competition
Club	Season	League			FA Cup		League Cup		Other		Total	
Club	Season	Division	Apps	Goals	Apps	Goals	Apps	Goals	Apps	Goals	Apps	Goals
Southend United	2001–02	Football League Third Division	2	0	0	0	0	0	0	0	2	0
Slough Town (loan)	2001–02	Isthmian League Division One	2	0	0	0	0	0	0	0	2	0
Woking	2001–02	Football Conference	–									
Aldershot Town	2002–03	Isthmian League Premier Division	–									
Aldershot Town	2003–04	Football Conference	–									
Aldershot Town	2004–05	Conference Premier	–									
Aldershot Town	Total		–									
Wealdstone	2005–06	Isthmian League Premier Division	0	0	0	0	0	0	0	0	0	0
Lewes	2005–06	Conference South	–									
AFC Wimbledon	2006–07	Isthmian League Premier Division	35	15	0	0	1	0	1 (Note: One appearance in the Isthmian League Premier Division play-offs)	0	37	15
Accrington Stanley	2007–08	Football League Two	22	7	0	0	0	0	1	1	23	8
Torquay United	2007–08	Conference National	19	3	0	0	0	0	6	2	25	5
Torquay United	2008–09	Conference National	27	9	5	0	1	0	3 (Note: Three appearances and one goal in the FA Trophy)	1	34	10
Torquay United	Total		46	12	5	0	1	0	9	3	59	15
AFC Wimbledon	2011–12	Conference National	0	0	0	0	0	0	0	0	0	0
Beaconsfield SYCOB (loan)	2011–12	Southern League Division One Central	–									
Staines Town	2011–12	Conference South	–									
Merstham	2011–12	Isthmian Division One South	–									
Merstham	2012–13	Isthmian Division One South	–									
Merstham	Total		–									
Whyteleafe	2013–14	Southern Counties East Premier Division	–									
Whyteleafe	2014–15	Isthmian Division One South	–									
Whyteleafe	2015–16	Isthmian Division One South	–									
Whyteleafe	2016–17	Isthmian Division One South	–									
Whyteleafe	Total		–									
Walton Casuals	2016–17	Isthmian Division One South	–									
Walton Casuals	2017–18	Isthmian South Division	0	0	0	0	0	0	0	0	0	0
Walton Casuals	Total		–									
Career total												
