= 2003–04 Football Conference =

Football Conference
- Season: 2003–04
- Champions: Chester City (1st Football Conference title)
- Promoted: Chester City, Shrewsbury Town
- Relegated to Conference North/Conference South: Margate (South)
- Folded: Telford United
- Promoted for the next season: Canvey Island, Crawley Town
- Matches: 462
- Goals: 1,343 (2.91 per match)
- Top goalscorer: Daryl Clare (Chester City), 29
- Biggest home win: Hereford – Halifax 7–1 (25 November 2003); Gravesend & Northfleet – Morecambe 6–0 (28 February 2004)
- Biggest away win: Dagenham & Redbridge – Hereford 0–9 (27 February 2004)
- Highest scoring: Dagenham & Redbridge – Hereford 0–9 (27 February 2004)
- Longest winning run: ?
- Longest unbeaten run: Chester City, 18 matches (26 Aug – 6 Dec)
- Longest losing run: ?
- Highest attendance: Exeter City v Accrington Stanley, 8,256 (24 Apr)
- Lowest attendance: Margate v Forest Green Rovers, 255 (4 April 2003)
- Average attendance: 1,905 (+ 18% compared to the previous season)

The 2003–04 Football Conference season was the 25th season of the Football Conference and the last consisting of a single division. The top team and the winner of the play-offs were promoted to Football League Two, while this season only one team was relegated.

A total of 22 teams contest the division, including 17 sides from last season, two relegated from the Football League Two and winners of Northern Premier League, Southern Football League and Isthmian League.

== Promotion and relegation ==
Teams promoted from Northern Premier League

- Accrington Stanley

Teams promoted from Southern Football League

- Tamworth

Teams promoted from Isthmian League

- Aldershot Town

Teams relegated from Third Division

- Exeter City
- Shrewsbury Town

== Overview ==
Chester City clinched the league title and won promotion to Football League Two.

Shrewsbury Town also earned promotion to League Two following their 3–0 play-off win on penalties after a 1–1 draw with Aldershot Town.

No clubs were relegated on the basis of their performances, due to Margate being demoted, Telford folding and the winners and runners-up of the Unibond League not meeting the criteria for a place in the Football Conference.

Shrewsbury Town had the highest attendance, 84,150 in all, with an average of 4,007. Margate and Leigh RMI had the least spectators with 11,905 and 11,881, respectively, with an average of 567 and 566, respectively.

The total number of attendance was 880,220, yielding an average of 1905 per game, which was the all-time record for the Football Conference.

The regular season began on 9 August 2003, and ended on 24 April 2004.

== Final league table ==
Pos	Team	Pld	W	D	L	GF	GA	GD	Pts	Promotion or relegation
1	Chester City (C, P)	42	27	11	4	85	34	+51	92	Promotion to Football League Two
2	Hereford United	42	28	7	7	103	44	+59	91	Qualification for the Football Conference play-offs
3	Shrewsbury Town (O, P)	42	20	14	8	67	42	+25	74	Qualification for the Football Conference play-offs
4	Barnet	42	19	14	9	60	46	+14	71	Qualification for the Football Conference play-offs
5	Aldershot Town	42	20	10	12	80	67	+13	70	Qualification for the Football Conference play-offs
6	Exeter City	42	19	12	11	71	57	+14	69	
7	Morecambe	42	20	7	15	66	66	0	67	
8	Stevenage Borough	42	18	9	15	58	52	+6	63	
9	Woking	42	15	16	11	65	52	+13	61	
10	Accrington Stanley	42	15	13	14	68	61	+7	58	
11	Gravesend & Northfleet	42	14	15	13	69	66	+3	57	
12	Telford United	42	15	10	17	49	51	−2	55	Club folded
13	Dagenham & Redbridge	42	15	9	18	59	64	−5	54	
14	Burton Albion	42	15	7	20	57	59	−2	51 (Note: Burton Albion were deducted 1 point for breaching rules.)	
15	Scarborough	42	12	15	15	51	54	−3	51	
16	Margate (R)	42	14	9	19	56	64	−8	51	Demoted to Conference South (Note: Margate were demoted to Conference South due to ground concerns.)
17	Tamworth	42	13	10	19	49	68	−19	49	
18	Forest Green Rovers	42	12	12	18	58	80	−22	48	
19	Halifax Town	42	12	8	22	43	65	−22	44	
20	Farnborough Town	42	10	9	23	53	74	−21	39	Reprived from relegation (Note: Farnborough Town, Leigh RMI, and Northwich Victoria were reprived from relegation due to the folding of Telford United, the demotion of Margate, and that the ground of Northern Premier League champions Hucknall Town did not meet Conference standards.)
21	Leigh RMI	42	7	8	27	46	97	−51	29	Reprived from relegation
22	Northwich Victoria	42	4	11	27	30	80	−50	23	Reprived from relegation

(C) Champions; (O) Play-off winners; (P) Promoted; (R) Relegated

== Locations ==
Locations of the Football Conference 2003–04 teams
Locations of the Football Conference London teams 2003–2004

== Results ==
Home \ Away	ACC	ALD	BAR	BRT	CHE	D&R	EXE	FAR	FGR	GRN	HAL	HER	LEI	MAR	MOR	NOR	SCA	SHR	STB	TAM	TEL	WOK
Accrington Stanley		4–2	2–0	3–1	0–2	2–3	1–2	3–1	4–1	3–3	2–1	2–0	4–1	3–2	1–0	2–2	1–0	0–1	2–1	3–0	1–5	3–3
Aldershot	2–1		1–1	3–1	1–1	2–1	2–1	2–0	3–0	2–2	3–1	1–2	2–0	0–2	2–2	4–3	1–2	1–1	2–0	1–1	3–1	2–1
Barnet	0–0	2–1		2–1	0–0	2–4	2–3	0–2	5–0	1–0	4–1	1–1	2–1	3–1	2–1	1–0	0–0	0–1	0–0	1–0	2–0	0–0
Burton Albion	1–1	1–4	2–3		1–1	0–1	3–4	1–0	2–3	3–0	2–2	4–1	3–2	0–1	0–1	0–1	2–0	0–1	1–1	0–1	2–1	2–0
Chester City	3–3	4–2	1–0	3–1		2–1	3–2	3–2	1–0	2–2	2–0	0–0	5–0	3–0	2–1	4–0	1–0	2–1	1–2	1–0	0–0	2–1
Dagenham & Redbridge	0–1	2–3	5–2	0–2	0–0		0–2	1–0	5–2	0–4	0–1	0–9	1–2	4–0	1–3	2–0	1–0	5–0	1–2	0–0	1–1	1–0
Exeter City	3–2	2–1	1–1	2–0	2–1	1–1		1–1	2–2	0–1	1–1	0–1	3–2	1–1	4–0	2–0	0–0	3–2	1–0	3–2	0–3	1–2
Farnborough Town	1–1	4–0	1–1	2–1	1–2	2–2	1–2		1–3	1–2	1–0	0–5	1–1	1–1	2–4	2–0	1–2	1–3	2–0	3–3	2–1	1–0
Forest Green Rovers	2–1	3–1	1–1	1–1	2–1	1–3	2–5	1–1		1–2	1–2	1–7	2–2	1–2	1–2	0–0	4–0	1–1	3–1	2–1	0–0	2–2
Gravesend & Northfleet	0–0	1–3	1–1	1–2	0–4	1–2	3–2	2–0	1–1		1–0	2–5	3–1	2–1	6–0	2–2	1–1	0–3	2–3	2–0	1–2	2–2
Halifax Town	1–1	1–2	1–2	1–4	0–3	3–0	2–0	2–0	0–1	1–0		1–2	2–1	0–1	1–0	5–3	1–0	0–0	2–1	1–2	1–1	2–2
Hereford United	1–0	4–3	2–0	1–2	2–1	1–1	1–1	2–0	5–1	3–3	7–1		0–1	2–1	3–0	1–0	2–1	2–1	1–0	0–1	2–1	0–1
Leigh RMI	1–2	2–2	1–4	0–1	2–6	2–1	1–1	0–2	1–2	1–2	1–1	0–5		4–2	3–1	1–0	1–4	2–2	1–3	1–1	1–1	0–1
Margate	3–1	1–2	0–1	1–2	1–2	3–3	0–1	3–0	2–0	1–3	2–0	1–3	2–0		1–1	3–1	0–2	0–2	1–4	3–2	1–0	1–2
Morecambe	1–0	2–0	1–3	2–1	0–1	3–2	0–3	3–2	4–0	2–2	2–0	2–2	1–0	3–3		3–0	2–1	3–3	2–1	4–0	1–0	2–1
Northwich Victoria	3–3	1–1	1–1	1–2	0–4	0–1	1–1	1–1	0–4	0–0	0–1	1–5	0–1	0–3	1–1		1–1	0–2	1–2	1–0	1–0	1–4
Scarborough	2–1	1–0	2–2	1–2	2–2	0–0	2–3	2–1	2–2	2–0	1–0	3–3	4–1	0–1	1–0	1–0		1–1	2–2	0–1	1–1	2–2
Shrewsbury Town	0–0	1–2	0–1	1–0	0–0	2–1	2–2	3–0	2–0	1–1	2–0	4–1	3–1	1–1	2–0	3–1	4–1		3–1	3–1	0–0	1–0
Stevenage Borough	2–1	0–1	1–2	1–0	0–0	0–2	2–2	3–2	2–1	2–2	1–0	0–2	4–0	2–1	0–1	1–0	2–2	2–0		3–1	0–1	1–1
Tamworth	1–1	3–3	2–0	1–1	1–5	2–0	2–1	2–1	1–0	1–3	2–0	1–3	4–3	1–1	2–3	2–1	0–0	1–1	1–2		0–1	2–0
Telford United	1–0	2–5	1–2	2–2	0–2	1–0	2–0	2–4	0–2	1–1	2–1	0–3	5–0	1–1	2–1	0–1	2–1	1–0	0–2	2–0		1–0
Woking	2–2	2–2	2–2	1–0	1–2	0–0	1–0	3–2	1–1	3–2	2–2	0–1	2–0	0–0	4–1	3–0	2–1	3–3	1–1	4–0	3–1	

Updated to match(es) played on unknown. Source: Soccerbase; Sky Sports Football Yearbook 2004–2003
Legend: Blue = home team win; Yellow = draw; Red = away team win.

== Play-offs ==
The Conference National play-offs determined the second team that would be promoted to Football League Two. The teams placed second through fifth qualified for the play-offs. The semi-finals were played in a two-leg, home and away format, while the final was played as one leg.

Semifinals
2nd	Hereford United	1	0	1 (2)
5th	Aldershot Town (pen.)	1	0	1 (4)
3rd	Shrewsbury Town (pen.)	1	1	2 (5)
4th	Barnet	2	0	2 (3)

Final at Britannia Stadium, Stoke-on-Trent; 16 May 2004
3rd	Shrewsbury Town (pen.)	1 (3)
5th	Aldershot Town	1 (0)

=== Semifinals ===
29 April 2004
19:45 BST
1st Leg

Aldershot Town	1–1	Hereford United
Dsane 45' (pen.)	Report	Brown 7'

Recreation Ground, Aldershot
Attendance: 6,379
Referee: Jarnail Singh
3 May 2004
15:00 BST
2nd Leg

Hereford United	0–0	Aldershot Town
Tretton (red card) 21'	Report
Penalties
Brown (penalty missed); Beesley (penalty missed); James (penalty scored); Smith (penalty scored)	2–4	(penalty missed) Dsane; (penalty scored) Gosling; (penalty scored) Giles; (penalty scored) Sills; (penalty scored) Antwi

Edgar Street, Hereford
Attendance: 7,044
Referee: Andy Woolmer

Aldershot Town won 4–2 on penalties after tying 1–1 on Aggregate.

29 April 2004
19:45
1st Leg

Barnet	2–1	Shrewsbury Town
Strevens 13' (pen.); Clist 90'	Report	Rodgers 43' (pen.)

Underhill Stadium, Chipping Barnet
Attendance: 4,171
3 May 2004
2nd Leg

Shrewsbury Town	1–0	Barnet
Rodgers 44' (pen.)	Report
Penalties
Sedgemore (penalty scored); Tolley (penalty scored); Rodgers (penalty scored); Cramb (penalty scored); Moss (penalty scored)	5–3	(penalty scored) Strevens; (penalty scored) Grazioli; (penalty scored) Yakubu; (penalty missed) Clist

Gay Meadow, Shrewsbury
Attendance: 7,012
Referee: Pollock

Shrewsbury Town won 5–3 on penalties after tying 2–2 on Aggregate.

=== Play-Off Final ===
16 May 2004
13:00

Aldershot Town	1–1 (a.e.t.)	Shrewsbury Town
McLean 35'		Darby 43'
Penalties
Sills (penalty missed); Giles (penalty missed); Gosling (penalty missed)	0–3	(penalty missed) Rodgers; (penalty scored) Tolley; (penalty scored) Sedgemore; (penalty scored) Challis

Britannia Stadium, Stoke-on-Trent
Attendance: 19,216

== Top scorers in order of league goals ==
Rank	Player	Club	League	Play-offs	FA Cup	LDV	FA Trophy	Total
1	(Republic of Ireland) Daryl Clare	Chester City	29	0	1	0	0	30
2	(England) Steve Guinan	Hereford United	25	0	3	1	0	29
=	(England) David McNiven	Leigh RMI	25	0	0	0	1	26
4	(England) Giuliano Grazioli	Barnet	24	0	2	0	0	26
5	(England) Roscoe D'Sane	Aldershot	21	1	2	0	3	27
6	(Republic of Ireland) Sean Devine	Exeter City	20	0	2	0	3	25
=	(England) Paul Mullin	Accrington Stanley	20	0	3	0	1	24
=	(England) Darryn Stamp	Chester City	20	0	0	0	0	20
9	(England) Tim Sills	Aldershot	18	0	1	0	2	21
10	(England) Anthony Elding	Stevenage Borough	17	0	2	0	0	19
=	(Saint Kitts and Nevis) Lutel James	Accrington Stanley	17	0	1	0	0	18
=	(England) Danny Carlton	Morecambe	17	0	0	0	0	17
13	(England) Mark Cooper	Tamworth	15	0	0	0	0	15
14	(England) David Brown	Hereford United	14	0	0	2	0	16
=	(England) Mark Quayle	Scarborough	14	0	1	0	0	15
