= Michael Brough (footballer) =

English-born Welsh footballer

Personal information
- Full name: Michael Brough
- Date of birth: 1 August 1981 (age 45)
- Place of birth: Nottingham, England
- Height: 6 ft 1 in (1.85 m)
- Position: Midfielder

Team information
- Current team: Harrogate Town

Youth career
- 1996–1998: Notts County

Senior career*
Years	Team	Apps	(Gls)
1998–2004	Notts County	89	(2)
1999–2000	→ Spalding United (loan)	?	(?)
2004–2006	Stevenage Borough	37	(3)
2006–2008	Forest Green Rovers	87	(6)
2008–2010	Torquay United	4	(0)
2009	→ Salisbury City (loan)	13	(0)
2009	→ Stevenage Borough (loan)	6	(0)
2009–2010	→ Mansfield Town (loan)	7	(0)
2010	Mansfield Town	13	(0)
2010–2011	Darlington	11	(0)
2011	Guiseley	5	(1)
2011–	Harrogate Town	5	(0)

International career
2003	Wales U21	3	(0)
2003	Wales U20	1	(0)
- * Club domestic league appearances and goals as of 17:59, 3 March 2012 (UTC)

Michael Brough (born 1 August 1981) is a footballer who plays for Harrogate Town. Although born in England, he has represented Wales at under-21 level and under-20 level.

== Career ==
Brough was born in Nottingham, Nottinghamshire. He began his career as a trainee with Notts County, turning professional in August 1998. In December 1999, he joined Spalding United on loan before returning to Meadow Lane. His League debut came on 7 March 2000 in a 1–0 win away to Gillingham.

He fell out of favour at Notts County and was allowed to join Macclesfield Town on trial in January 2004, after being told that his short-term contract would not be renewed. He also had a trial with Lincoln City the following month.

He was released by Notts County in March 2004 and joined Stevenage Borough, moving on to Forest Green Rovers in January 2006 on a free transfer. He was made captain at Forest Green, under the management of his former Notts County teammate Gary Owers, but left in May 2008 to join Paul Buckle's Torquay United.

He made his Torquay debut in August 2008, playing in the 3–1 defeat away to Crawley Town, after which he lost his place, starting only one other game that season. On 2 February 2009, Brough and fellow Torquay defender Chris Todd joined Salisbury City on loan.

Brough was then loaned to Mansfield Town, and was signed by the club in January 2010, but then went on to join Darlington for the 2010–11 season. He injured a knee in pre-season, and played only seven games for Darlington before undergoing further surgery which was to keep him out of football for nine months. Given a short-term contract in September 2011, he made six appearances for Darlington, but then left the club and spent a month with Conference North club Guiseley, before signing for divisional rivals Harrogate Town in December.
