= Chris Todd =

Welsh footballer & manager (born 1981)

Personal information
- Full name: Christopher Richard Todd
- Date of birth: 22 August 1981 (age 45)
- Place of birth: Swansea, Wales
- Height: 6 ft 0 in (1.83 m)
- Position: Defender

Team information
- Current team: Newport County (assistant manager)

Youth career
- Swansea City

Senior career*
| Years | Team | Apps | (Gls) |
| 2000–2002 | Swansea City | 43 | (4) |
| 2002–2003 | Drogheda United | 19 | (0) |
| 2003–2007 | Exeter City | 154 | (7) |
| 2007–2010 | Torquay United | 67 | (7) |
| 2009 | → Salisbury City (loan) | 8 | (1) |
| 2009 | → Salisbury City (loan) | 4 | (1) |
| 2010 | → Newport County (loan) | 15 | (3) |
| 2010–2011 | Newport County | 46 | (5) |
| 2011–2013 | Forest Green Rovers | 2 | (0) |
| 2012 | → Hereford United (loan) | 5 | (1) |
| 2013–2016 | Eastleigh | 62 | (4) |
| 2016–2018 | Truro City | 12 | (1) |
| Total | | 418 | (34) |

Managerial career
- 2015: Eastleigh (caretaker manager)
- 2015–2016: Eastleigh (player-manager)
- 2018–2019: Gloucester City
- 2026: Newport County (interim manager)
- * Club domestic league appearances and goals

Christopher Richard Todd (born 22 August 1981) is a Welsh former footballer who played as a defender. He is assistant manager of Newport County.

== Playing career ==
=== Swansea City ===
Born in Swansea, Todd began his career as a trainee with his home town club, Swansea City, turning professional in August 1999. He made his debut on 10 March 2001 at home in a 1–1 draw with Northampton Town, going on to make 46 appearances before being released in June 2002.

=== Drogheda United ===
Todd then moved to Republic of Ireland, where he spent a season with Drogheda United. He made 19 appearances during his spell with the club.

=== Exeter City ===
He returned to English football with Exeter City in January 2003. Although he was unable to prevent Exeter being relegated from the Football League that season, he remained with the club, and was consistently a first-team regular.

Upon Glenn Cronin's departure during the 2006 off-season, Todd was appointed captain of Exeter City for the 2006–07 season.

=== Torquay United ===
Todd joined local rivals Torquay United in June 2007 for a fee of £7,500. and quickly became a regular in the newly relegated Conference National side.

==== First loan at Salisbury City ====
With his treatment for his leukaemia going well, Todd returned to training and on 2 February 2009, joined Salisbury City on loan to regain match fitness.

==== Return to Torquay United ====
After a successful loan spell at Salisbury, he returned to Torquay for the last month of the 2008–09 season. Todd went straight back into the first team and, during this month, he won the 'Man of the Match' award for the Conference National Play-off Final, helping Torquay win the game and promotion to League Two.

==== Second loan at Salisbury City ====
However, the following season, Todd lost his place in the first team about a quarter of the way through the season and found himself sitting on the bench. This was when Salisbury took him back on loan, after being given special dispensation by the Conference board due to an injury and suspension crisis.

=== Newport County ===
In January 2010, Todd joined Conference South leaders Newport County on loan for the remainder of the 2009–10 season. Newport were crowned 2009–10 Conference South champions with a record 103 points, 28 points ahead of second placed Dover Athletic.

He was released by Torquay on 15 May 2010, along with six other players and joined Newport County on a permanent deal.

=== Forest Green Rovers ===
Todd signed a 2-year contract for Forest Green Rovers on 25 May 2011. Todd made his Rovers league debut in the live televised fixture against Stockport County on 12 August 2011. Todd failed to complete the match though as he left the pitch injured and it was later revealed he would need surgery to repair a torn hamstring that would keep him out for five months.

==== Loan at Hereford United ====
In October 2012, Todd joined Hereford United on a month-long loan. He appeared 7 times in all competitions for Hereford and returned to Forest Green at the end of his loan spell in November.

=== Eastleigh ===
On 10 January 2013, Todd left Forest Green and signed for Eastleigh on a free transfer, signing an 18-month contract.

=== Truro City ===
On 14 October 2016, Todd signed a short-term contract with Truro City.

== Managerial career ==
On 15 October 2015, Todd was appointed player-manager of Eastleigh. The club finished the 2015–16 season in 7th place in the National League. On 17 August 2016, Todd was relieved of his duties as both manager and player after just four matches of the 2016–17 season. On 10 October 2018, Todd was announced as the new manager of National League South side Gloucester City, but was sacked 3 January 2019 after 1 win 8 loses and 4 draws.

On 21 September 2019, Todd returned to Torquay United as 1st team coach and manager for the club's U18 squad winning the quadruple.

On 8 June 2022, Todd left Torquay to join Yeovil Town as assistant manager to his former team-mate Chris Hargreaves. Following a poor start to the season, Hargreaves was sacked on 27 October 2022 but Todd remained as assistant manager to the incoming manager Mark Cooper

On 24 September 2025, Todd left his role at Yeovil Town to return to National League club Eastleigh as director of football. After two months in the role, Todd departed the club by mutual consent.

On 5 March 2026 Todd rejoined EFL League Two club Newport County as assistant first team coach to team manager Christian Fuchs. On 28 June 2026 Todd was appointed interim Manager of Newport County following the resignation of Fuchs. On 31 July 2026 Hayden Mullins was appointed Newport County manager with Todd retained as Assistant Manager.

== Personal life ==
On 19 November 2008, it was announced that Todd had been diagnosed with chronic myeloid leukaemia He was able to return to football in February 2009.

In September 2011, Todd released a book titled "More Than Football; In The Blood". He wrote and published the book himself to raise money for leukaemia and lymphoma research.

In September 2012, Todd sang as part of the 'Big C choir' at the Royal Albert Hall in the 2012 Sunflower Jam concert in aid of charities supporting cancer. A documentary, following the progress of the choir, aired on Channel 4 in October 2012.

Todd has appeared in the short film Meet Again, as a soldier fighting in the Second World War.

== Career statistics ==
As of match played on 25 November 2017

Appearances and goals by club, season and competition
| Season | Club | League | | | FA Cup | | League Cup | | Other | | Total | |
| Season | Club | Division | Apps | Goals | Apps | Goals | Apps | Goals | Apps | Goals | Apps | Goals |
|---|---|---|---|---|---|---|---|---|---|---|---|---|
| Swansea City | 2000–01 | Second Division | 11 | 1 | 0 | 0 | 0 | 0 | 0 | 0 | 11 | 1 |
| Swansea City | 2001–02 | Third Division | 33 | 3 | 1 | 0 | 1 | 0 | 0 | 0 | 35 | 3 |
| Swansea City | Swansea total | | 44 | 4 | 1 | 0 | 1 | 0 | 0 | 0 | 46 | 4 |
| Drogheda United | 2002–03 | Irish Premier Division | | | | | | | | | | |
| Exeter City | 2002–03 | Third Division | 12 | 0 | 0 | 0 | 0 | 0 | 0 | 0 | 12 | 0 |
| Exeter City | 2003–04 | Conference National | 39 | 1 | 4 | 0 | — | | 0 | 0 | 43 | 1 |
| Exeter City | 2004–05 | Conference National | 27 | 1 | 0 | 0 | — | | 2 (Note: Appearances in the Football League Trophy) | 0 | 29 | 1 |
| Exeter City | 2005–06 | Conference National | 41 | 4 | 1 | 0 | — | | 2 (Note: Appearances in the FA Trophy) | 1 | 44 | 5 |
| Exeter City | 2006–07 | Conference National | 38 | 1 | 1 | 0 | — | | 1 | 0 | 40 | 1 |
| Exeter City | Exeter total | | 157 | 7 | 6 | 0 | 0 | 0 | 5 | 1 | 168 | 8 |
| Torquay United | 2007–08 | Conference Premier | 44 | 5 | 2 | 2 | — | | 3 | 0 | 49 | 7 |
| Torquay United | 2008–09 | Conference Premier | 18 | 1 | 0 | 0 | — | | 0 | 0 | 18 | 1 |
| Torquay United | 2009–10 | League Two | 9 | 1 | 0 | 0 | 1 | 0 | 1 | 0 | 11 | 1 |
| Torquay United | Torquay total | | 71 | 7 | 2 | 2 | 1 | 0 | 4 | 0 | 78 | 9 |
| Salisbury City (loan) | 2008–09 | Conference Premier | 8 | 1 | 0 | 0 | — | | 0 | 0 | 8 | 1 |
| Salisbury City (loan) | 2009–10 | Conference Premier | 4 | 1 | 0 | 0 | — | | 0 | 0 | 4 | 1 |
| Newport County (loan) | 2009–10 | Conference Premier | 15 | 3 | 0 | 0 | — | | 0 | 0 | 15 | 3 |
| Newport County | 2010–11 | Conference Premier | 41 | 5 | 1 | 0 | — | | 3 | 0 | 45 | 5 |
| Forest Green Rovers | 2011–12 | Conference Premier | 2 | 0 | 0 | 0 | — | | 1 | 0 | 3 | 0 |
| Hereford United (loan) | 2012–13 | Conference Premier | 5 | 1 | 2 | 0 | — | | 0 | 0 | 7 | 1 |
| Eastleigh | 2012–13 | Conference South | 20 | 2 | 0 | 0 | — | | 0 | 0 | 20 | 2 |
| Eastleigh | 2013–14 | Conference South | 33 | 2 | 0 | 0 | — | | 4 | 0 | 37 | 2 |
| Eastleigh | 2014–15 | Conference Premier | 9 | 0 | 0 | 0 | — | | 1 | 0 | 10 | 0 |
| Eastleigh | 2015–16 | National League | 1 | 0 | 0 | 0 | — | | 0 | 0 | 1 | 0 |
| Eastleigh | Eastleigh total | | 63 | 4 | 0 | 0 | 0 | 0 | 5 | 0 | 68 | 4 |
| Truro City | 2016–17 | National League South | 7 | 1 | 0 | 0 | — | | 0 | 0 | 7 | 1 |
| Truro City | 2017–18 | National League South | 2 | 0 | 0 | 0 | — | | 0 | 0 | 2 | 0 |
| Truro City | Truro City total | | 9 | 1 | 0 | 0 | 0 | 0 | 0 | 0 | 9 | 1 |
| Career total | | | 419 | 34 | 12 | 2 | 2 | 0 | 18 | 1 | 451 | 37 |

== Managerial statistics ==
As of match played 1 January 2019

Managerial record by team and tenure
| Team | From | To | Record | | | | | Ref |
| Team | From | To | P | W | D | L | Win % | Ref |
|---|---|---|---|---|---|---|---|---|
| Eastleigh (caretaker) | 23 September 2015 | 15 October 2015 | 4 | 3 | 0 | 1 | 75.00 | |
| Eastleigh (player-manager) | 15 October 2015 | 17 August 2016 | 41 | 18 | 11 | 12 | 43.90 | |
| Gloucester City | 10 October 2018 | 3 January 2018 | 15 | 0 | 4 | 11 | 0.00 | |
| Total | | | 60 | 21 | 15 | 24 | 35.00 | — |
