= Steve Woods =

English footballer

Personal information
- Full name: Stephen John Woods
- Date of birth: 15 December 1976 (age 49)
- Place of birth: Davenham, Cheshire, England
- Height: 6 ft 0 in (1.83 m)
- Position: Centre back

Youth career
- 1992–1996: Stoke City

Senior career*
| Years | Team | Apps | (Gls) |
| 1997–1999 | Stoke City | 34 | (0) |
| 1998 | → Plymouth Argyle (loan) | 5 | (0) |
| 1999–2001 | Chesterfield | 25 | (0) |
| 2001–2009 | Torquay United | 249 | (11) |
| 2009–2010 | Stalybridge Celtic | 38 | (1) |
| 2010–2011 | Northwich Victoria | 10 | (0) |
| 2011 | → FC Halifax Town (loan) | 3 | (0) |
| Total | | 364 | (12) |
- * Club domestic league appearances and goals

Stephen John Woods (born 15 December 1976) is an English former footballer who played in the Football League for Chesterfield, Plymouth Argyle, Stoke City and Torquay United.

== Career ==
Woods was born in Davenham, Cheshire and began his career as a trainee with Stoke City, turning professional in August 1994. He made his league debut in March 1998, coming on as first-half substitute for Ally Pickering in a 2–1 defeat at home to Huddersfield Town. Later that month he joined Plymouth Argyle on loan, making five appearances before returning to Stoke. Woods' first start for Stoke, under manager Brian Little, came on the opening day of the 1998–99 season, a 3–1 home victory over Northampton Town. He remained a regular in the side for most of the season playing in 39 matches with Stoke finishing in a poor position of 8th.

He was released by Stoke in May 1999 and joined Chesterfield in July 1999. He failed to establish himself at Chesterfield and was allowed to join Darlington on trial in November 2000. He returned to Chesterfield at the end of his trial and moved to Torquay United on a free transfer in August 2001. He initially signed on a short-term contract, making an impressive debut against AFC Bournemouth in the League Cup. Torquay manager Roy McFarland was impressed enough to reward Woods with a contract for the next two seasons.

He was a regular in his first season, but in 2002–03 played only nine times due to a serious knee injury. He was given a short-term 'prove your fitness' deal at the end of the season, which was extended as he returned to form. He later helped Leroy Rosenior's side win promotion to League One, and remained a significant player in the side relegated the following season and who battled to avoid a second successive relegation in the 2005–06 season. He remained with the club following their relegation to the Conference National in 2007 and was appointed captain for the following season. In March 2009, Torquay manager Paul Buckle announced that the club would not be offering Woods a new contract for the 2009–10 season, citing his reasons as wanting to bring through his younger players such as Mark Ellis and Chris Robertson.

He spent the 2009 pre-season with Morecambe, joining Stalybridge Celtic in August 2009. For the 2010–11 season he signed with Northwich Victoria and in September 2010 he commenced on a part-time bachelor's degree in Physiotherapy at the University of Salford. In March 2011 he joined FC Halifax Town on loan.

== Career statistics ==
| Club | Season | League | | | FA Cup | | League Cup | | Other^{[A]} | | Total | |
| Club | Season | Division | Apps | Goals | Apps | Goals | Apps | Goals | Apps | Goals | Apps | Goals |
|---|---|---|---|---|---|---|---|---|---|---|---|---|
| Stoke City | 1997–98 | First Division | 1 | 0 | 0 | 0 | 0 | 0 | 0 | 0 | 1 | 0 |
| Stoke City | 1998–99 | Second Division | 33 | 0 | 2 | 0 | 2 | 0 | 2 | 0 | 39 | 0 |
| Stoke City | Total | | 34 | 0 | 2 | 0 | 2 | 0 | 2 | 0 | 40 | 0 |
| Plymouth Argyle (loan) | 1997–98 | Second Division | 5 | 0 | 0 | 0 | 0 | 0 | 0 | 0 | 5 | 0 |
| Chesterfield | 1999–2000 | Second Division | 25 | 0 | 0 | 0 | 4 | 0 | 1 | 0 | 30 | 0 |
| Chesterfield | 2000–01 | Third Division | 0 | 0 | 0 | 0 | 0 | 0 | 0 | 0 | 0 | 0 |
| Chesterfield | Total | | 25 | 0 | 0 | 0 | 4 | 0 | 1 | 0 | 30 | 0 |
| Torquay United | 2001–02 | Third Division | 38 | 2 | 1 | 0 | 1 | 0 | 0 | 0 | 40 | 2 |
| Torquay United | 2002–03 | Third Division | 9 | 0 | 1 | 0 | 0 | 0 | 0 | 0 | 10 | 0 |
| Torquay United | 2003–04 | Third Division | 46 | 6 | 1 | 0 | 1 | 0 | 1 | 0 | 49 | 6 |
| Torquay United | 2004–05 | League One | 36 | 2 | 0 | 0 | 1 | 0 | 1 | 0 | 38 | 2 |
| Torquay United | 2005–06 | League Two | 38 | 0 | 5 | 0 | 1 | 0 | 0 | 0 | 43 | 0 |
| Torquay United | 2006–07 | League Two | 32 | 0 | 4 | 0 | 1 | 0 | 1 | 0 | 38 | 0 |
| Torquay United | 2007–08 | Conference National | 23 | 0 | 1 | 0 | 0 | 0 | 1 | 0 | 25 | 0 |
| Torquay United | 2008–09 | Conference National | 27 | 1 | 4 | 0 | 0 | 0 | 1 | 0 | 32 | 1 |
| Torquay United | Total | | 249 | 11 | 17 | 0 | 5 | 0 | 5 | 0 | 276 | 11 |
| Stalybridge Celtic | 2009–10 | Conference North | 34 | 1 | 3 | 0 | 0 | 0 | 4 | 0 | 41 | 1 |
| Stalybridge Celtic | 2010–11 | Conference North | 4 | 0 | 0 | 0 | 0 | 0 | 0 | 0 | 4 | 0 |
| Stalybridge Celtic | Total | | 38 | 1 | 3 | 0 | 0 | 0 | 4 | 0 | 45 | 1 |
| Career Total | | | 351 | 12 | 22 | 0 | 11 | 0 | 12 | 0 | 396 | 12 |

A. The "Other" column constitutes appearances and goals in the FA Trophy and Football League Trophy.
