= Wayne Carlisle =

Irish footballer (born 1979)

Personal information
- Full name: Wayne Thomas Carlisle
- Date of birth: 9 September 1979 (age 47)
- Place of birth: Lisburn, Northern Ireland
- Height: 5 ft 10 in (1.78 m)
- Position: Midfielder

Team information
- Current team: AFC Bournemouth Head of Coaching

Youth career
- Lisburn Youth
- Crystal Palace

Senior career*
Years	Team	Apps	(Gls)
1997–2002	Crystal Palace	46	(3)
2001–2002	→ Swindon Town (loan)	11	(2)
2002–2004	Bristol Rovers	71	(14)
2004–2006	Leyton Orient	40	(3)
2006–2008	Exeter City	62	(10)
2008–2010	Torquay United	71	(10)
2011	Truro City	3	(0)
2014–2015	Truro City	2	(0)
Total		306	(42)

International career
1999–2001	Northern Ireland U21 & B	12	(1)

Managerial career
- 2023: Rotherham United (caretaker)
- * Club domestic league appearances and goals

Wayne Thomas Carlisle (born 9 September 1979) is a Northern Irish former professional footballer who played as a midfielder. He is currently Head of Coaching at AFC Bournemouth Academy

Carlisle was primarily a right-sided midfielder, however was able to play in a wide range of positions. He was capped by Northern Ireland at youth, under-21 level and B international.

== Career ==
Carlisle was born in Lisburn, Northern Ireland. He played for Lisburn Youth in Drumbo before being scouted. He began his career with then English Championship side Crystal Palace. Due to the club's financial troubles during the late 1990s, first-team opportunities became available for the then-young trainee. He made his league debut in February 1999 in Palace's 1–1 draw at home to Birmingham City. Carlisle featured in 46 first team league matches while at Selhurst Park, but when Simon Jordan stepped in to save the club, investments in more experienced and high-profile players limited Carlisle's chances.

In October 2001 Carlisle moved on loan to Swindon Town for three months, where he featured in 11 matches, scoring 2 goals. On 28 March 2002, Carlisle moved on a free transfer to League Two side Bristol Rovers. In his over two years at Memorial Stadium, Carlisle produced a scoring record 14 goals in 71 matches, this despite the team struggling against relegation. With Rovers needing to cut costs, Carlisle, along with teammate Danny Boxall was placed on the transfer list in December 2003.

He was released by Rovers in May 2004 and joined then League Two side Leyton Orient on a two-year contract the following month. In the 2005–06 season, Carlisle was restricted to mostly appearances from the bench, and transferred to Conference National side Exeter City in the January transfer window.

Carlisle started promisingly with his new club, breaking straight into the first team, but his season was ended prematurely with a broken leg suffered against Tamworth. At the end of the season, departing manager Alex Inglethorpe released Carlisle on a free transfer.

On 6 October 2006, Carlisle was re-signed by new Exeter City manager Paul Tisdale after impressing as an early season trialist. Carlisle was taken to hospital on 19 October 2006 to have his appendix removed. He broke back into the Exeter City first team, was offered an extended contract, and was involved in their promotion to the Football League in 2008, scoring in both of the play-off semi-final games against local rivals Torquay United.

Although offered a contract by Exeter, Carlisle chose to join Torquay United in May 2008, where on his third visit to the new Wembley in three years Carlisle gained his second consecutive promotion. Carlisle started the 2009–10 season in fine form but early in the new year sustained a knee injury which restricted him to on a handful of games before the end of the season. Carlisle signed a six-month contract with Torquay United at the start of the 2010–11 season but in January 2011 took the decision to retire from professional football to pursue a career in player development at Ivybridge Community College, Devon.

On 4 March 2011, Carlisle signed for Southern Premier League side Truro City, but his spell there was short lived and in May 2011 he retired from playing football altogether to focus on a career in coaching.

During the 2014-15 season, however, he came out of retirement to play twice for Truro City in the Southern League Premier Division; he also made one appearance in the FA Cup for the club.

== Career statistics ==
Club	Season	Division	League		FA Cup		League Cup		Other		Total	
Club	Season	Division	Apps	Goals	Apps	Goals	Apps	Goals	Apps	Goals	Apps	Goals
Crystal Palace	1998–99	Division One	6	0	0	0	0	0	0	0	6	0
Crystal Palace	1999–2000	Division One	26	3	0	0	1	0	0	0	27	3
Crystal Palace	2000–01	Division One	14	0	1	0	5	0	0	0	20	0
Crystal Palace	2001–02	Division One	0	0	0	0	1	0	0	0	1	0
Total			46	3	1	0	7	0	0	0	54	3
→ Swindon Town (loan)	2001–02	Division Two	11	2	2	0	0	0	0	0	13	2
Total			11	2	2	0	0	0	0	0	13	2
Bristol Rovers	2001–02	Division Three	5	0	0	0	0	0	0	0	5	0
Bristol Rovers	2002–03	Division Three	41	7	4	1	1	0	0	0	46	8
Bristol Rovers	2003–04	Division Three	25	7	1	0	1	0	1 (Note: Appearance(s) in Football League Trophy)	0	28	7
Total			71	14	5	1	2	0	1	0	79	15
Leyton Orient	2004–05	League Two	28	3	2	1	1	0	3 (Note: Appearance(s) and goal(s) in Football League Trophy)	1	34	5
Leyton Orient	2005–06	League Two	12	0	3	0	0	0	2	0	17	0
Total			40	3	5	1	1	0	5	1	51	5
Exeter City	2005–06	Conference Premier	6	1	0	0	0	0	1 (Note: Appearance(s) in FA Trophy)	0	7	1
Exeter City	2006–07	Conference Premier	24	5	0	0	0	0	4 (Note: 1 appearance(s) in FA Trophy) (Note: 3 appearance(s) in Conference play-offs)	0	28	5
Exeter City	2007–08	Conference Premier	32	4	2	1	0	0	4 (Note: 2 appearance(s) in FA Trophy) (Note: 2 appearances and 2 goals in Conference play-offs)	2	38	7
Total			62	10	2	1	0	0	9	2	73	13
Torquay United	2008–09	Conference Premier	37	8	2	0	0	0	2 (Note: 2 appearances in Conference play-offs)	0	41	8
Torquay United	2009–10	League Two	24	2	3	0	1	0	2	0	30	2
Torquay United	2010–11	League Two	10	0	0	0	0	0	1	0	11	0
Total			71	10	5	0	1	0	5	0	82	10
Truro City	2010–11	Southern League Premier Division	3	0	0	0	0	0	0	0	3	0
Truro City	2014–15	Southern League Premier Division	2	0	1	0	0	0	0	0	3	0
Total			5	0	1	0	0	0	0	0	6	0
Career total			306	42	21	3	11	0	20	3	358	48

== Coaching career ==
In March 2017, Carlisle returned to former club Exeter City in the role of head of coaching to ensure coaching consistency at all age groups. Following the departure of Eric Kinder in the summer of 2019, Carlisle was promoted to the role of assistant manager. The 2021–22 season saw Carlisle and manager Matt Taylor lead Exeter to promotion from League Two with a second-placed finish.

On 4 October 2022, Carlisle followed manager Taylor as assistant manager to EFL Championship side Rotherham United on a contract until 2026. Following Taylor's sacking in November 2023, Carlisle formed a three-man interim management team with Dan Green and Scott Brown. Following the appointment of Leam Richardson, Carlisle continued to assist the manager, before departing the club on 19 December 2023.

In February 2024, Carlisle joined former club Bristol Rovers as Individual Player Development Coach, once again supporting Matt Taylor. On 1 July 2024, the club announced that he had been appointed assistant manager. With the club sat in twentieth position, he was sacked alongside Taylor on 16 December 2024.

In June 2025, Carlisle was appointed assistant manager of National League South side Bath City.
