= Paul Brown (English footballer) =

English footballer

Personal information
- Full name: Paul Henry Brown
- Date of birth: 10 September 1984 (age 42)
- Place of birth: Liverpool, England
- Height: 5 ft 8 in (1.73 m)
- Position: Midfielder

Team information
- Current team: Workington

Youth career
- Tranmere Rovers

Senior career*
Years	Team	Apps	(Gls)
2004–2006	Tranmere Rovers	4	(0)
2005	→ Accrington Stanley (loan)	3	(0)
2006–2007	Barrow	14	(3)
2007	Kingston City	?	(?)
2007–2009	Barrow	91	(13)
2009–2010	Droylsden	30	(10)
2010	Witton Albion	?	(?)
2010–2011	Vauxhall Motors	7	(1)
2011	Droylsden	3	(0)
2012	Marine	?	(?)
2012–	Workington	0	(0)

International career^{‡}
2009	England C	1	(0)
- * Club domestic league appearances and goals as of 11:14, 7 October 2012 (UTC) ‡ National team caps and goals as of 23:50, 26 August 2011 (UTC)

Paul Henry Brown (born 10 September 1984) is an English footballer who plays as a midfielder. He currently plays for Workington.

== Club career ==
Brown made his debut for Tranmere Rovers, coming on as a substitute in the 87th minute, at home to MK Dons, in the 2–0 victory in League One on 27 November 2004. He made a further two appearances in League Two during the 2004–05 season. The following season, 2005–06, he was sent out on loan to Accrington Stanley in September, and made three appearances in the Conference National.

He then joined Barrow in August 2006, before leaving March 2007. He then joined Australian club Kingston City, returning to Barrow in August 2007, helping them to achieve promotion from the Conference North via the play-offs in 2007–08. After one season in the Conference National he was released by Barrow.

Brown signed for Droylsden in the 2009–10 season following his release by Barrow. He left the club in September 2011.

In October 2012, Brown joined Workington.

== International career ==
Byron played for England C in a 4–0 victory over the Malta under-21 team in February 2009.
