= Tim Sills =

English footballer (born 1979)

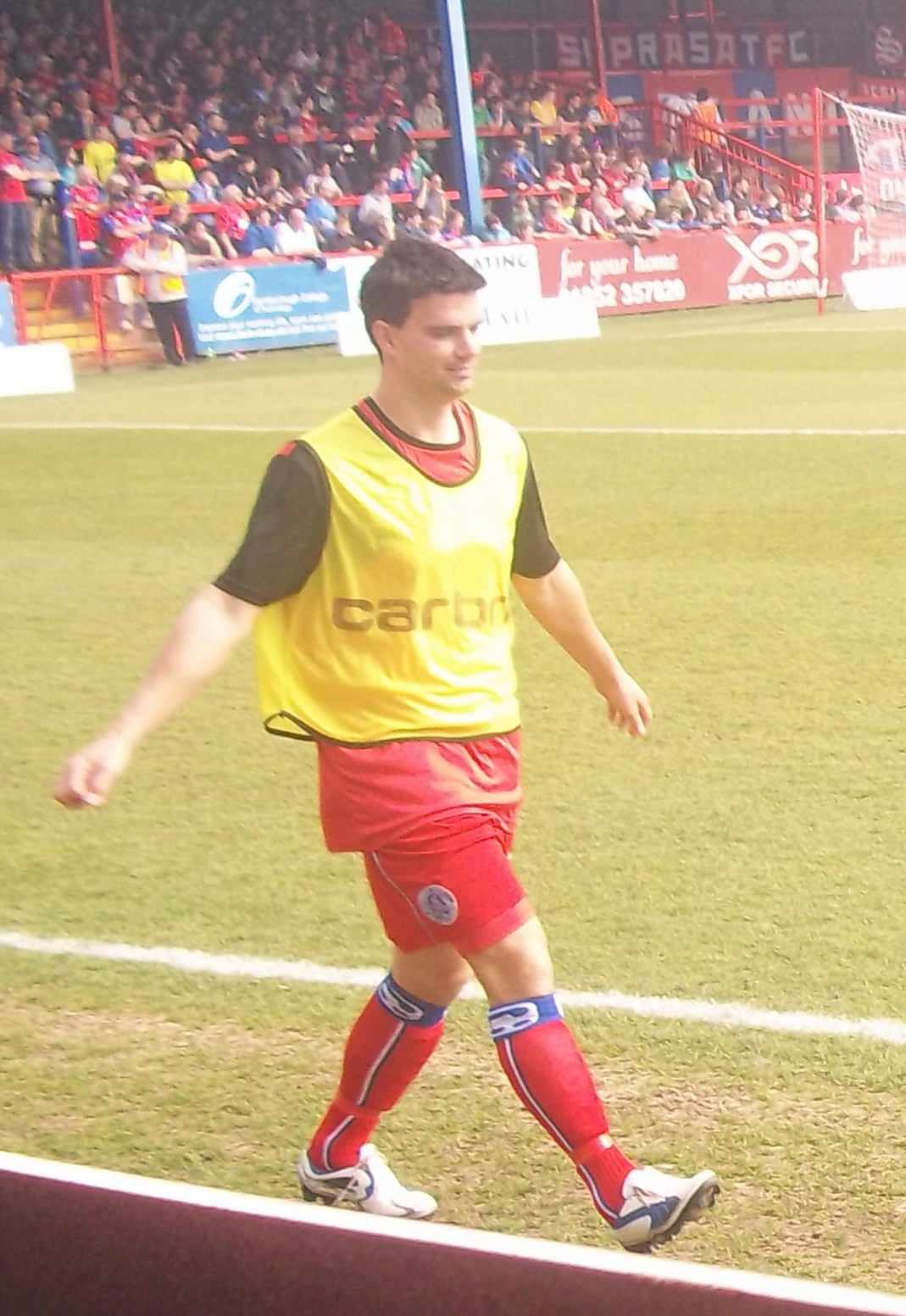

Personal information
- Full name: Timothy Sills
- Date of birth: 10 September 1979 (age 47)
- Place of birth: Romsey, England
- Height: 6 ft 2 in (1.88 m)
- Position: Striker

Team information
- Current team: Wimborne Town (manager)

Youth career
- 1996–1997: Millwall

Senior career*
Years	Team	Apps	(Gls)
1997–1999	Camberley Town	47	(29)
1999–2002	Basingstoke Town	104	(33)
2000	→ Staines Town (loan)	5	(8)
2002	→ Kingstonian (loan)	16	(5)
2002–2003	Kingstonian	41	(21)
2003–2006	Aldershot Town	96	(43)
2006	Oxford United	13	(1)
2006–2007	Hereford United	36	(2)
2007–2010	Torquay United	107	(34)
2010–2011	Stevenage	18	(0)
2010	→ Rushden & Diamonds (loan)	11	(1)
2011	Aldershot Town	19	(2)
2011–2013	Basingstoke Town	77	(24)
2013	Bashley	10	(4)
2013–2014	Gosport Borough	19	(1)
2014–2016	Weymouth	51	(8)
2016–2017	Blackfield & Langley	16	(3)
Total		686	(219)

International career
2003	England C	1	(0)

Managerial career
- 2019–2022: Hamworthy United
- 2022–: Wimborne Town
- * Club domestic league appearances and goals

Timothy Sills (born 10 September 1979) is an English former professional footballer who played as a striker. He is manager of Wimborne Town.

Sills was a product of Millwall's youth system and was a regular in the club's youth team up until he left in 1997. He then joined part-time outfit Camberley Town, spending a year and a half at the club, before moving to Basingstoke Town towards the end of the 1998–99 season. Sills spent three seasons with Basingstoke, playing over 100 games for the club. During his time at the club, he was loaned out twice; to Staines Town and Kingstonian respectively – joining the latter permanently ahead of the club's 2002–03 campaign. After a successful first season at Kingstonian, he joined Aldershot Town in order to ply his trade in the highest tier of non-league football. He spent 2 1/2 years with the Hampshire club, scoring regularly, before signing for Football League side Oxford United in January 2006 for £50,000. He struggled for first-team appearances, as well as goals, and was released at the end of the season.

Sills subsequently joined Hereford United in June 2006 and spent one season at the club before being released. At the start of the 2007–08 season he signed for Torquay United, and scored in the game that earned Torquay promotion to the Football League a year later. He struggled for games during the 2009–10 season as manager Paul Buckle went about reshaping his squad mid-season and Sills was deemed surplus to requirements at Plainmoor. He signed for Hertfordshire side Stevenage in January 2010 for an undisclosed fee, playing an important part in the club's end of season run, as Stevenage won promotion to the Football League for the first time in the club's history. Sills was also a PE teacher at both Marriotts School and Poole High School.

== Club career ==
Sills began his career as a trainee at Millwall and, after he left, opted to combine university studies with non-League football. He began at Camberley Town and moved to Basingstoke Town towards the end of the 1998–99 season. He also had loan spells at Staines Town and Kingstonian before signing for the K's for the 2002–03 season. One season later he made the step up to Conference football with Aldershot Town.

In 2 1/2 seasons with the Shots, Sills scored 46 goals from 112 appearances. In his first season, he helped them to the Conference play-off final, although he was left out of the starting XI for the final itself. He continued to work as an event team coordinator until July 2004. It was then he began to play football full-time. He signed for League Two club Oxford United in January 2006 for £50,000. He scored only one goal from 13 league appearances for Oxford.

Sills was released at the end of the season and looked set to join Conference side Exeter City, but signed a two-year deal with Hereford United in June 2006. He scored four times on his debut, a 10–0 friendly win against Ludlow Town, and started the first 13 matches of the season but only managed to score once, against Hartlepool. His only other goal of the season came away at Notts County in December, and the season progressed into a frustrating one for Sills. A controversial sending off against Swindon Town, only minutes after coming on as a substitute, did not do him any favours.

At the end of the season he was linked with several other clubs, including former club Aldershot, and on 28 June 2007 he signed for Torquay United. He was the club's top scorer in the 2007–08 season scoring 20 goals in 48 league and Cup appearances. In May 2009, Sills scored the second goal against Cambridge United in the Conference National play-off final to send Torquay United back into the Football League. Sills scored a total of 47 goals in 2 1/2 years at Plainmoor, and was the first Gulls player for 44 years to score 20 goals in two successive seasons.

In January 2010, Sills signed for Stevenage on an 18–month contract. He made his debut for the Hertfordshire side in a 2–0 win against Kettering Town, coming on as a substitute and setting up the first goal. A week later, in his first start for the club, Sills scored his first goal for Stevenage in a 4–1 victory over Dover Athletic in the FA Trophy. It was to be Sills' only goal of the season, as the striker featured a total of 19 times. Ahead of the 2010–11 season, Sills scored the only goal of the game in the club's 1–0 win against Yeovil Town in a "behind closed doors" match. He made his first appearance of the 2010–11 league campaign in September 2010, starting the match in Stevenage's 1–0 loss at Cheltenham Town.

In September 2010, Sills joined Rushden & Diamonds on a three-month loan deal.

In January 2011, Sills signed with Aldershot Town until the end of the season following his release from Stevenage. Tim rejoined Basingstoke in the summer of 2011 from Aldershot Town, having originally played for 'Stoke between March 1999 and March 2002, arriving from Camberley Town along with brother Julian. He scored 44 goals in his first spell in the blue and yellow. He went on to appear for Kingstonian, Aldershot Town (twice), Oxford United, Hereford United, Torquay United, Stevenage and Rushden & Diamonds.

On 27 July 2013 it was announced that Sills has agreed to sign for Southern League Premier Division side Bashley.

On 17 October 2013, Sills left Bashley for Conference South side Gosport Borough. Nine days later, he made his debut for Gosport in a 2–1 win over Chelmsford City, scoring one goal.

== International career ==
Sills was called up to play for the England C team, who represent England at non-league level, in a game against the Belgium U23 squad in Ostend in February 2003.

== Coaching career ==
In October 2019 Sills was appointed manager of Hamworthy United. During the 2021–22 season, Sills led Hamworthy to the Wessex Premier League title, finishing with a total of 99 points having only suffered one defeat as well as guiding his side to the Semi-Finals stage of the FA Vase.

On 10 October 2022, Sills departed Hamworthy United to become manager of Wimborne Town.

== Personal life ==
Before becoming a full-time footballer, Sills graduated from the University of Portsmouth, earning a degree in sports science, whilst he was also playing part-time football with Basingstoke Town. And, even after graduating, Sills continued to lead his 'double life', playing football for Kingstonian while he was working as a Sports Council development officer. At the age of 24, Sills became a full-time professional footballer, giving up his job as a marketing executive. In February 2009, Sills appeared as a contestant on the game show Wogan's Perfect Recall, finishing as runner-up.

== Career statistics ==
As of 2 June 2015

Appearances and goals by club, season and competition
Club	Season	League^{[A]}		FA Cup		League Cup		Other^{[B]}		Total	
Club	Season	Apps	Goals	Apps	Goals	Apps	Goals	Apps	Goals	Apps	Goals
Camberley Town	1997–98	19	7	2	0	0	0	0	0	21	7
Camberley Town	1998–99	28	22	5	2	0	0	0	0	33	24
Camberley Town	Total	47	29	7	2	0	0	0	0	54	31
Basingstoke Town	1998–99	6	2	0	0	0	0	0	0	6	2
Basingstoke Town	1999–2000	37	12	1	0	0	0	2	1	40	13
Basingstoke Town	2000–01	38	14	1	0	0	0	3	1	42	15
Basingstoke Town	2001–02	23	5	2	0	0	0	2	2	27	7
Basingstoke Town	Total	104	33	4	0	0	0	7	4	115	37
Staines Town (loan)	2000–01	5	8	0	0	0	0	0	0	5	8
Kingstonian (loan)	2001–02	16	5	0	0	0	0	0	0	16	5
Kingstonian	2002–03	41	20	2	1	0	0	3	1	46	22
Aldershot Town	2003–04	38	18	3	1	0	0	5	1	46	20
Aldershot Town	2004–05	37	15	2	1	0	0	3	0	42	16
Aldershot Town	2005–06	21	10	1	0	0	0	1	0	23	10
Aldershot Town	Total	96	43	6	2	0	0	9	1	111	46
Oxford United	2005–06	13	1	0	0	0	0	0	0	13	1
Hereford United	2006–07	36	2	4	0	2	0	1	0	43	2
Torquay United	2007–08	44	19	2	0	0	0	5	2	51	21
Torquay United	2008–09	45	13	5	4	0	0	4	1	54	18
Torquay United	2009–10	18	2	3	0	1	1	2	1	24	4
Torquay United	Total	107	34	10	4	1	1	11	4	129	43
Stevenage	2009–10	17	0	0	0	0	0	2	1	19	1
Stevenage	2010–11	1	0	0	0	0	0	1	0	2	0
Stevenage	Total	18	0	0	0	0	0	3	1	21	1
Rushden & Diamonds (loan)	2010–11	11	1	0	0	0	0	0	0	11	1
Aldershot Town	2010–11	19	2	0	0	0	0	0	0	19	2
Basingstoke Town	2011–12	41	12	5	1	0	0	3	0	49	13
Basingstoke Town	2012–13	37	11	2	1	0	0	1	0	39	12
Basingstoke Town	Total	78	23	7	2	0	0	4	0	88	26
Bashley	2013–14	10	3	0	0	0	0	0	0	10	3
Gosport Borough	2013–14	19	1	0	0	0	0	7	4	26	5
Career total		620	205	40	11	3	1	45	15	707	233

== Footnotes ==
A. The "League" column constitutes appearances and goals (including those as a substitute) in the Football League, Football Conference, and Isthmian League.
B. The "Other" column constitutes appearances and goals (including those as a substitute) in the FA Trophy, Football League Trophy, Hampshire Senior Cup and play-offs.

== Honours ==
=== As a player ===
Stevenage

- Conference National: 2009–10

=== As a manager ===
Wimborne Town FC

- Southern League Division One South: 2023-24
