= 2004–05 Football Conference =

The 2004–05 season was the 26th season of the Football Conference, and the 1st season following its expansion from one division to three divisions.

== Overview ==
This season saw the Conference expanded to three divisions with the addition of the Conference North and Conference South added to the existing (and renamed) Conference National. The North and South Divisions were filled by teams finishing 1st–13th in the Northern Premier League Premier Division and 2nd–13th in the Isthmian League Premier Division and Southern League Premier Division the previous season (the champions were all promoted to the Conference National), together with winners of play-offs between the 14–18th placed clubs in the Southern League Premier, 14th–20th in the Isthmian and Northern Premier League Premier, as well as the top clubs from the divisions immediately below.

The Conference National was joined by Carlisle United and York City, who had been relegated from the Football League. Carlisle became the first club to compete in all top five tiers of English football, having reached the old First Division in 1974–75.

In addition to the winners and the teams that qualified for the play-offs, Exeter City fought gallantly in the FA Cup against Manchester United, holding them to a goalless draw in the third round on Old Trafford and finally going down 0–2 on home turf.

== Conference National ==
Conference National
- Season: 2004–05
- Champions: Barnet (2nd Football Conference title)
- Direct promotion: Barnet
- Promoted through play-offs: Carlisle United
- Relegated to Conference North/Conference South: Farnborough Town, Leigh RMI, Northwich Victoria
- Promoted for the next season: Altrincham, Grays Athletic, Southport
- Matches: 462
- Goals: 1,305 (2.82 per match)
- Top goalscorer: Giuliano Grazioli (Barnet), 29
- Biggest home win: Carlisle United – Farnborough 7–0 (28 August 2004)
- Biggest away win: Farnborough – Hereford United 0–6 (25 March 2005); Leigh RMI – Accrington Stanley 0–6 (11 December 2004)
- Highest scoring: Barnet – Farnborough 7–1 (19 March 2005)
- Longest winning run: ?
- Longest unbeaten run: ?
- Longest losing run: ?
- Highest attendance: Carlisle v Barnet, 9,215 (16 Oct)
- Lowest attendance: Canvey Island v Leigh RMI, 201 (5 April 2005)
- Average attendance: 1,922 (Conference record, + 0.9% compared with the previous season)

A total of 22 teams contest the division, including 18 sides from last season, two relegated from the Football League Two, one promoted from the Southern Football League and one promoted from the Isthmian League. Winners and runners-up of Northern Premier League were unable to qualify in Conference National.

=== Promotion and relegation ===
Teams promoted from 2003–04 Southern Football League

- Crawley Town

Teams promoted from 2003–04 Isthmian League

- Canvey Island

Teams relegated from 2003–04 Football League Third Division

- Carlisle United
- York City

=== League table ===
Pos	Team	Pld	W	D	L	GF	GA	GD	Pts	Promotion or relegation
1	Barnet (C, P)	42	26	8	8	90	44	+46	86	Promotion to Football League Two
2	Hereford United	42	21	11	10	68	41	+27	74	Qualification for the Conference National play-offs
3	Carlisle United (O, P)	42	20	13	9	74	37	+37	73	Qualification for the Conference National play-offs
4	Aldershot Town	42	21	10	11	68	52	+16	73	Qualification for the Conference National play-offs
5	Stevenage Borough	42	22	6	14	65	52	+13	72	Qualification for the Conference National play-offs
6	Exeter City	42	20	11	11	71	50	+21	71	
7	Morecambe	42	19	14	9	69	50	+19	71	
8	Woking	42	18	14	10	58	45	+13	68	
9	Halifax Town	42	19	9	14	74	56	+18	66	
10	Accrington Stanley	42	18	11	13	72	58	+14	65	
11	Dagenham & Redbridge	42	19	8	15	68	60	+8	65	
12	Crawley Town	42	16	9	17	50	50	0	57	
13	Scarborough	42	14	14	14	60	46	+14	56	
14	Gravesend & Northfleet	42	13	11	18	58	64	−6	50	
15	Tamworth	42	14	11	17	53	63	−10	50 (Note: Tamworth were deducted 3 points for breaching League rules.)	
16	Burton Albion	42	13	11	18	50	66	−16	50	
17	York City	42	11	10	21	39	66	−27	43	
18	Canvey Island	42	9	15	18	53	65	−12	42	
19	Northwich Victoria (R)	42	14	10	18	58	72	−14	42 (Note: Northwich Victoria were deducted 10 points due to entering administration.)	Demoted to Conference North (Note: Northwich Victoria were demoted to the Conference North due to ground requirements.)
20	Forest Green Rovers	42	6	15	21	41	81	−40	33	(Note: Forest Green Rovers were reprieved from relegation due to Northwich Victoria's relegation.)
21	Farnborough Town (R)	42	6	11	25	35	89	−54	29	Relegation to Conference South
22	Leigh RMI (R)	42	4	6	32	31	98	−67	18	Relegation to Conference North

(C) Champions; (O) Play-off winners; (P) Promoted; (R) Relegated

=== Locations ===
Locations of the Conference National 2004–05 teams
Locations of the Football Conference National London teams 2004–2005

=== Results ===
Home \ Away	ACC	ALD	BAR	BRT	CAN	CRL	CRA	D&R	EXE	FAR	FGR	GRN	HAL	HER	LEI	MOR	NOR	SCA	STB	TAM	WOK	YOR
Accrington Stanley		3–3	4–1	3–1	1–0	1–2	4–0	0–3	0–0	2–1	2–2	1–2	1–1	2–1	2–1	2–1	5–0	2–1	4–1	2–3	0–0	2–2
Aldershot	0–0		2–3	3–0	2–0	0–5	1–0	4–0	2–1	3–1	1–2	1–0	0–0	0–2	2–0	3–3	2–1	2–0	0–1	4–3	4–0	2–0
Barnet	3–0	2–1		2–3	1–0	1–1	3–0	5–0	1–0	7–1	3–1	4–1	3–1	0–2	3–2	5–1	4–0	1–0	2–1	0–3	2–0	4–0
Burton Albion	2–2	1–3	1–1		1–1	0–1	1–0	1–3	1–0	0–0	4–1	3–2	2–2	3–0	0–0	1–3	1–0	2–3	0–3	1–1	0–1	0–2
Canvey Island	0–2	2–2	0–1	2–2		0–3	2–2	4–2	2–2	1–1	2–1	1–1	0–1	0–4	3–0	0–0	2–2	1–0	3–0	3–3	2–2	4–0
Carlisle United	2–0	1–1	1–3	0–0	0–0		1–0	1–0	0–2	7–0	0–1	2–2	1–0	3–1	3–0	3–3	1–0	2–1	1–2	2–1	2–1	6–0
Crawley Town	2–0	1–0	1–3	4–0	2–1	1–0		2–0	0–1	2–0	4–2	1–1	1–2	1–1	2–2	2–1	0–0	2–1	1–2	3–0	2–1	1–0
Dagenham & Redbridge	0–5	3–0	2–0	3–1	3–1	1–0	1–0		2–3	0–0	2–2	5–0	4–2	3–1	2–0	2–1	2–3	0–3	3–1	0–0	1–1	0–3
Exeter City	1–2	3–1	0–3	3–1	0–1	0–0	3–2	1–1		2–1	2–0	3–0	2–1	4–0	5–1	1–1	2–3	3–1	2–0	2–2	0–0	0–1
Farnborough Town	2–1	1–2	0–0	1–3	1–3	1–2	2–3	2–1	2–1		1–1	0–3	3–2	0–6	0–1	1–2	0–2	0–1	0–3	2–2	0–0	1–1
Forest Green Rovers	1–0	0–0	0–2	3–2	2–2	0–3	1–1	1–4	2–3	1–1		1–5	0–0	1–3	1–1	0–3	1–3	0–1	1–1	1–1	1–3	1–1
Gravesend & Northfleet	2–2	1–3	1–3	0–2	3–2	1–3	0–0	2–1	1–1	2–2	0–0		0–3	1–2	4–1	1–2	2–2	4–0	2–1	2–0	1–1	4–0
Halifax Town	1–2	2–0	2–3	2–0	4–1	2–2	1–0	2–2	2–1	2–0	4–0	1–0		0–1	5–1	1–3	2–2	2–1	2–1	3–3	3–1	2–0
Hereford United	0–0	2–0	1–1	0–0	1–0	0–0	0–0	0–1	1–2	3–1	2–1	1–0	2–3		3–0	1–1	4–0	1–0	0–1	2–1	2–2	2–0
Leigh RMI	0–6	3–3	0–3	1–4	2–1	1–6	1–2	0–1	0–1	1–2	2–0	0–1	0–3	3–4		0–2	0–1	1–1	1–2	2–3	0–3	0–3
Morecambe	1–2	0–0	1–1	3–0	4–0	1–1	1–2	1–0	2–2	1–1	3–1	1–3	2–1	2–1	2–1		3–1	2–1	1–3	3–0	2–1	2–1
Northwich Victoria	3–3	1–2	2–0	4–0	3–1	2–2	1–0	2–2	1–2	2–0	2–1	1–2	1–2	1–4	2–0	2–2		1–0	1–1	1–2	1–3	3–0
Scarborough	4–0	2–2	1–1	1–1	1–1	1–1	2–2	2–0	1–1	4–0	0–0	1–0	3–1	0–0	3–0	1–1	3–0		3–3	2–2	2–0	5–1
Stevenage Borough	5–0	0–1	2–1	0–1	1–4	2–1	1–0	1–0	3–2	3–1	2–2	2–0	2–1	0–1	2–0	0–1	4–1	1–0		2–0	0–2	2–2
Tamworth	1–0	1–2	0–2	0–2	1–0	1–0	1–0	0–4	1–2	0–2	4–0	2–1	2–1	2–2	0–1	0–0	3–0	1–0	0–0		1–3	1–0
Woking	2–1	1–2	1–1	1–0	1–0	1–1	2–0	2–4	3–3	2–0	0–1	2–0	2–1	1–1	1–0	0–0	2–0	1–1	1–2	2–1		1–0
York City	0–1	0–2	2–1	1–2	0–0	2–1	3–1	0–0	1–2	4–0	1–3	0–0	1–1	0–3	1–1	1–0	0–0	0–2	3–1	2–0	0–2	

Updated to match(es) played on unknown. Source: Soccerbase
Legend: Blue = home team win; Yellow = draw; Red = away team win.

=== Play-offs ===
Semifinals; 1st leg 2 May, 2nd leg 6 May
2nd	Hereford United	1	0	1
5th	Stevenage Borough	1	1	2
3rd	Carlisle United (pen.)	0	2	2 (5)
4th	Aldershot Town	1	1	2 (4)

Final at Britannia Stadium, Stoke-on-Trent; 14 May 2005
3rd	Carlisle United	1
5th	Stevenage Borough	0

==== Semifinals ====
2 May 2005
1st Leg

Stevenage Borough	1–1	Hereford United
Maamria 87'	Report	Carey-Bertram 74'

Broadhall Way, Stevenage
Attendance: 6,520
6 May 2005
2nd Leg

Hereford United	0–1	Stevenage Borough
	Report	Maamria 68'

Edgar Street, Hereford
Attendance: 6,862

Stevenage Borough won 2–1 on Aggregate.

2 May 2005
1st Leg

Aldershot Town	1–0	Carlisle United
Crittenden 48'	Report

Recreation Ground, Aldershot
Attendance: 6,617
6 May 2005
2nd Leg

Carlisle United	2–1 (a.e.t.)	Aldershot Town
Livesey 13'; Billy 35'	Report	Slabber 90+5'
Penalties
Livesey (penalty scored)	5–4	(penalty missed) Challinor

Brunton Park, Carlisle
Attendance: 10,803

Carlisle United won 5–4 on penalties after tying 2–2 on Aggregate.

==== Play-Off Final ====
14 May 2005
19:30

Stevenage Borough	0–1	Carlisle United
		Murphy 23'

Britannia Stadium, Stoke-on-Trent
Attendance: 13,422
Referee: Jonathan Moss

=== Topscorers ===
Pos	Player	Club	League	Play-offs	FA Cup	LDV	FA Trophy	Total
1	(England) Giuliano Grazioli	Barnet	29	0	0	0	0	29
2	(England) Michael Twiss	Morecambe	22	0	3	0	0	25
3	(England) Paul Mullin	Accrington Stanley	20	0	0	0	0	20
4	(England) Anthony Elding	Stevenage Borough	19	0	1	1	0	21
=	(Wales) Chris Moore	Dagenham & Redbridge	19	0	1	1	0	21
=	(England) Adam Stansfield	Hereford United	19	0	1	0	1	21
=	(England) Bob Taylor	Tamworth	19	0	0	0	0	19
9	(England) Charlie Griffin	Forest Green Rovers	17	0	1	0	0	18
10	(Northern Ireland) Lee McEvilly	Accrington Stanley	15	0	0	2	0	17
=	(England) Jonny Allan	Northwich Victoria	15	0	0	0	1	16
12	(England) Lee Boylan	Canvey Island	14	0	0	0	3	17
=	(England) Tim Sills	Aldershot Town	14	0	2	0	0	16
=	(England) Justin Richards	Woking	14	0	1	0	1	16
=	(England) Neil Redfearn	Scarborough	14	0	0	0	0	14
16	(England) Karl Hawley	Carlisle United	13	0	1	0	1	15
=	(England) Paul Brayson	Northwich Victoria	13	0	0	0	0	13

== Conference North ==
Conference North
- Season: 2004–05
- Champions: Southport (1st Football Conference North title)
- Direct promotion: Southport
- Promoted through play-offs: Altrincham
- Relegated to Level 7: Ashton United, Bradford Park Avenue, Runcorn F.C. Halton
- Promoted for the next season: Hednesford, Hyde United, Workington
- Matches: 462
- Goals: 1,257 (2.72 per match)
- Biggest home win: Harrogate – Ashton 5–1 (12 February 2005); Harrogate – Gainsborough Trinity 5–1 (24 August 2004); 4–0: six matches
- Biggest away win: Barrow – Redditch 1–6 (11 September 2004); Kettering – Southport 0–5 (22 January 2005)
- Highest scoring: Ashton – Runcorn 5–4 (28 August 2004)
- Longest winning run: ?
- Longest unbeaten run: ?
- Longest losing run: ?
- Highest attendance: ?
- Lowest attendance: ?
- Average attendance: ?

The first Conference North/South season saw a competition of 44 teams based on the results of the previous season of the Northern Premier League, Southern Football League and Isthmian League, with the exceptions of Crawley Town and Canvey Island who had been promoted directly to the Conference National. The teams were divided by geographical criteria.

=== Promotion ===
Teams promoted from 2003–04 Northern Premier League

- Hucknall Town
- Droylsden
- Barrow
- Alfreton Town
- Harrogate Town
- Southport
- Worksop Town
- Lancaster City
- Vauxhall Motors
- Gainsborough Trinity
- Stalybridge Celtic
- Altrincham
- Runcorn F.C. Halton
- Bradford Park Avenue (Northern Premier League Premier Division playoff winners)
- Ashton United

Teams promoted from 2003–04 Southern Football League

- Stafford Rangers
- Nuneaton Borough
- Worcester City
- Hinckley United
- Moor Green
- Redditch United

Teams promoted from 2003–04 Isthmian League

- Kettering Town

=== League table ===
Pos	Team	Pld	W	D	L	GF	GA	GD	Pts	Promotion or relegation
1	Southport (C, P)	42	25	9	8	83	45	+38	84	Promotion to Conference National
2	Nuneaton Borough	42	25	6	11	68	45	+23	81	Qualification for the Conference North/South play-offs
3	Droylsden	42	24	7	11	82	52	+30	79	Qualification for the Conference North/South play-offs
4	Kettering Town	42	21	7	14	56	50	+6	70	Qualification for the Conference North/South play-offs
5	Altrincham (O, P)	42	19	12	11	66	46	+20	69	Qualification for the Conference North/South play-offs
6	Harrogate Town	42	19	11	12	62	49	+13	68	
7	Worcester City	42	16	12	14	59	53	+6	60	
8	Stafford Rangers	42	14	17	11	52	44	+8	59	
9	Redditch United	42	18	8	16	65	59	+6	59 (Note: Redditch United were deducted 3 points for fielding an ineligible player.)	
10	Hucknall Town	42	15	14	13	59	57	+2	59	
11	Gainsborough Trinity	42	16	9	17	55	55	0	57	
12	Hinckley United	42	15	11	16	55	62	−7	56	
13	Lancaster City	42	14	12	16	51	59	−8	54	
14	Alfreton Town	42	15	8	19	53	55	−2	53	
15	Vauxhall Motors	42	14	11	17	48	57	−9	53	
16	Barrow	42	14	10	18	50	64	−14	52	
17	Worksop Town	42	16	12	14	59	59	0	50 (Note: Worksop Town were deducted 10 points for entering administration.)	
18	Moor Green	42	13	10	19	55	64	−9	49	
19	Stalybridge Celtic	42	12	12	18	52	70	−18	48	
20	Runcorn FC Halton (R)	42	10	12	20	44	63	−19	42	Relegation to the Northern Premier League Premier Division
21	Ashton United (R)	42	8	9	25	46	79	−33	33	Relegation to the Northern Premier League Premier Division
22	Bradford (Park Avenue) (R)	42	5	9	28	37	70	−33	24	Relegation to the Northern Premier League Premier Division

(C) Champions; (O) Play-off winners; (P) Promoted; (R) Relegated

=== Locations ===
Locations of the Football Conference North 2004–2005 teams

=== Results ===
Home \ Away	ALF	ALT	ASH	BRW	BPA	DRO	GAI	HAR	HIN	HUC	KET	LNC	MOG	NUN	RED	RUN	SOU	STA	STL	VAU	WRC	WKS
Alfreton Town		0–2	1–1	1–1	2–1	0–1	0–1	2–0	0–2	0–2	1–2	2–3	2–2	2–0	1–2	4–0	2–1	0–1	1–0	3–1	0–0	0–0
Altrincham	1–2		1–2	2–0	0–0	2–2	4–1	3–0	4–1	1–1	3–3	4–0	0–2	1–0	0–0	3–3	2–1	1–0	4–1	3–1	2–0	4–1
Ashton United	3–1	0–1		1–2	0–0	1–0	1–3	3–2	0–2	0–0	0–2	2–0	1–3	2–3	2–3	5–4	0–3	1–2	2–3	0–2	1–0	2–3
Barrow	0–3	2–0	1–1		3–2	1–3	2–0	1–0	3–0	0–3	2–1	2–2	3–4	1–3	1–6	1–1	0–2	2–2	2–1	1–2	2–2	2–1
Bradford Park Avenue	0–4	1–2	3–3	0–1		2–0	0–3	1–2	1–1	2–4	1–2	1–0	1–1	2–2	0–3	0–1	3–1	3–1	0–1	0–1	0–1	1–1
Droylsden	3–2	2–0	4–0	2–0	3–3		2–1	2–1	1–0	3–1	2–3	3–4	2–2	1–0	1–0	3–0	1–3	4–0	0–0	4–0	2–3	1–3
Gainsborough Trinity	1–2	0–1	1–0	1–0	2–0	1–1		0–0	1–1	0–1	1–1	4–2	1–1	1–2	2–1	2–3	1–0	1–1	2–2	1–2	3–0	1–1
Harrogate Town	2–1	1–1	5–1	2–1	2–1	2–1	5–1		1–1	0–0	2–1	1–1	1–2	3–1	4–2	1–0	2–5	0–1	2–0	2–1	2–0	0–0
Hinckley United	1–0	2–1	3–1	1–0	4–0	3–3	3–1	0–1		0–3	0–1	2–2	2–1	2–3	1–2	0–0	0–0	0–2	1–1	1–4	0–4	3–1
Hucknall Town	4–0	4–2	2–1	1–2	0–0	0–4	2–5	1–1	1–1		2–1	0–2	1–1	1–3	2–1	0–0	2–4	2–1	3–0	1–1	2–2	0–0
Kettering Town	1–1	0–1	0–0	2–0	1–0	0–2	0–1	0–0	3–1	3–1		0–2	1–2	1–0	1–0	2–1	0–5	0–1	2–0	1–1	2–1	2–1
Lancaster City	0–1	1–1	2–0	2–1	0–1	0–1	2–0	0–3	2–3	2–2	1–0		3–1	0–2	0–0	2–1	1–1	1–0	0–1	3–1	0–2	1–0
Moor Green	0–1	2–2	2–0	1–1	1–0	1–2	2–1	2–1	2–1	1–1	1–2	0–2		1–3	1–0	2–1	2–3	0–1	2–2	0–2	1–2	2–0
Nuneaton Borough	1–1	0–0	1–0	1–1	2–1	3–2	1–0	2–0	0–1	1–3	2–0	2–0	1–0		0–1	3–0	0–1	4–3	1–0	2–1	2–0	0–2
Redditch United	1–3	0–1	3–2	2–0	3–1	1–1	0–1	2–1	3–0	1–1	2–3	0–0	3–1	1–5		1–0	3–2	1–0	2–3	4–1	0–4	3–2
Runcorn	1–0	2–1	2–0	1–0	2–1	1–3	0–1	0–0	1–2	1–2	2–0	2–2	2–1	0–0	0–1		0–2	3–3	1–1	1–1	2–2	0–1
Southport	3–1	2–1	1–2	0–0	1–0	3–0	2–1	2–3	3–2	1–0	1–3	0–0	2–1	3–0	1–1	3–1		0–0	2–0	2–1	2–2	1–1
Stafford Rangers	3–1	0–1	1–1	2–2	1–0	2–0	2–0	1–1	1–1	1–2	3–0	2–2	2–1	2–3	1–1	0–0	1–1		3–2	1–1	0–0	4–0
Stalybridge Celtic	2–3	1–1	2–1	1–2	1–4	1–3	2–2	1–3	0–2	2–0	1–2	2–2	2–2	1–1	1–0	1–0	3–5	1–0		2–1	1–0	2–2
Vauxhall Motors	2–0	2–0	0–0	0–2	1–0	1–2	1–0	1–1	0–2	1–0	0–2	3–1	1–0	1–1	1–1	1–2	0–3	0–0	1–2		2–2	1–1
Worcester City	0–0	2–1	2–2	0–1	2–1	3–1	1–2	1–2	1–1	3–0	2–2	3–1	4–1	0–2	2–1	2–1	1–3	0–0	2–1	1–0		0–2
Worksop Town	3–2	1–1	3–1	2–1	2–1	0–2	1–3	2–0	3–1	2–1	0–3	2–0	1–0	2–3	5–3	1–1	1–2	0–0	1–1	2–3	2–0	

Updated to match(es) played on unknown. Source: Sky Sports Football Yearbook 2005–2006. Glenda Rollin & Jack Rollin (eds.). Headline, 2006.
Legend: Blue = home team win; Yellow = draw; Red = away team win.

=== Top scorers ===
Pos	Player	Club	Goals
1	(England) Terry Fearns	Southport	28
2	(England) Colin Little	Altrincham	24
3	(Guinea) Norman Sylla	Redditch United	22
=	(England) Adam Webster	Worcester City	22
5	(England) Peter Duffield	Alfreton Town	20

== Conference South ==
Conference South
- Season: 2004–05
- Champions: Grays Athletic (1st Football Conference South title)
- Direct promotion: Grays Athletic
- Promoted through play-offs: None
- Relegated to Level 7 or folded: Margate, Redbridge; Hornchurch (folded)
- Promoted for the next season: Eastleigh, Histon, Yeading
- Matches: 462
- Goals: 1,404 (3.04 per match)
- Biggest home win: Grays Athletic – Bognor Regis 6–0 (16 November 2004); Hornchurch – Basingstoke 6–0 (4 September 2004); Hornchurch – Maidenhead 6–0 (21 September 2004)
- Biggest away win: Dorchester – Grays Athletic 0–7 (23 October 2004)
- Highest scoring: Bognor Regis – Welling United 6–5 (11 September 2004)
- Longest winning run: ?
- Longest unbeaten run: ?
- Longest losing run: ?
- Highest attendance: ?
- Lowest attendance: ?
- Average attendance: ?

First Conference North/South season saw competition of best 44 teams by the results of previous season from Northern Premier League, Southern Football League and Isthmian League, except Crawley Town and Canvey Island, promoted directly to Conference National. Teams were divided by geographical criteria.

=== Promotion ===
Teams promoted from 2003–04 Southern Football League

- Weymouth
- Newport County
- Cambridge City
- Welling United
- Weston-super-Mare
- Eastbourne Borough
- Havant & Waterlooville
- Dorchester Town(Southern Football League Premier Division playoff winners)

Teams promoted from 2003–04 Isthmian League

- Sutton United
- Thurrock
- Hornchurch
- Grays Athletic
- Carshalton Athletic
- Hayes
- Bognor Regis Town
- Bishop's Stortford
- Maidenhead United
- Ford United
- St Albans City (Isthmian League Premier Division playoff winners)
- Lewes (Isthmian League Division One South winners, promoted through playoffs)
- Basingstoke Town (promoted after higher finished Hendon decided not to take part in Conference South)

Teams relegated from 2003–04 Football Conference

- Margate

At the start of the season Ford United was given new name Redbridge F.C.

=== League table ===
Pos	Team	Pld	W	D	L	GF	GA	GD	Pts	Promotion or relegation
1	Grays Athletic (C, P)	42	30	8	4	118	31	+87	98	Promotion to Conference National
2	Cambridge City	42	23	6	13	60	44	+16	75	Qualification for the Conference North/South play-offs
3	Thurrock	42	21	6	15	61	56	+5	69	Qualification for the Conference North/South play-offs
4	Lewes	42	18	11	13	73	64	+9	65	(Note: Lewes were barred from the play-offs due to ground issues.)
5	Eastbourne Borough (O)	42	18	10	14	65	47	+18	64	Qualification for the Conference North/South play-offs
6	Basingstoke Town	42	19	6	17	57	52	+5	63	
7	Weymouth	42	17	11	14	62	59	+3	62	
8	Dorchester Town	42	17	11	14	77	81	−4	62	
9	Bognor Regis Town	42	17	9	16	70	65	+5	60	
10	Bishop's Stortford	42	17	8	17	70	66	+4	59	
11	Weston-super-Mare	42	15	13	14	55	60	−5	58	
12	Hayes	42	15	11	16	55	57	−2	56	
13	Havant & Waterlooville	42	16	7	19	64	69	−5	55	
14	St Albans City	42	16	6	20	64	76	−12	54	
15	Sutton United	42	14	11	17	60	71	−11	53	
16	Welling United	42	15	7	20	64	68	−4	52	
17	Hornchurch	42	17	10	15	71	63	+8	51 (Note: Hornchurch were deducted 10 points for entering administration.)	Club folded
18	Newport County	42	13	11	18	56	61	−5	50	
19	Carshalton Athletic	42	13	9	20	44	72	−28	48	
20	Maidenhead United	42	12	10	20	54	81	−27	46	Reprieved from relegation (Note: Maidenhead United were reprieved from relegation due to Hornchurch folding.)
21	Margate (R)	42	12	8	22	54	75	−21	34 (Note: Margate were deducted 10 points for entering administration.)	Relegation to the Isthmian League Premier Division
22	Redbridge (R)	42	11	3	28	50	86	−36	33 (Note: Redbridge were deducted 3 points for fielding an ineligible player.)	Relegation to the Isthmian League Premier Division

(C) Champions; (O) Play-off winners; (P) Promoted; (R) Relegated

=== Locations ===
Locations of the Football Conference South 2004–2005 teams
Locations of the Football Conference South London teams 2005–2006

=== Results ===
Home \ Away	BAS	BST	BOG	CAM	CAR	DOR	EAB	GRY	H&W	HAY	HOR	LEW	MDH	MAR	NPC	RED	SAC	SUT	THU	WEL	WSM	WEY
Basingstoke Town		2–3	2–1	2–1	0–1	2–2	0–2	0–3	3–2	2–0	2–0	0–0	0–1	2–1	3–0	3–0	5–1	1–0	3–0	4–0	1–1	0–1
Bishop's Stortford	1–3		2–3	3–0	2–0	2–1	2–0	1–2	1–1	0–4	3–1	1–0	2–1	3–0	3–0	2–1	2–0	3–2	0–0	4–2	2–2	0–2
Bognor Regis Town	2–1	3–1		1–2	1–0	7–2	1–0	0–0	1–1	1–2	3–1	1–3	1–2	2–2	0–2	4–1	4–1	0–1	3–2	6–5	3–0	2–2
Cambridge City	2–1	3–2	1–0		3–0	2–2	2–2	0–2	2–0	1–0	0–3	2–3	0–1	2–1	2–0	2–1	2–0	0–1	0–0	0–1	1–2	4–1
Carshalton Athletic	2–0	0–3	0–0	0–2		4–3	1–4	0–2	2–1	3–2	0–2	1–0	1–1	0–1	1–0	1–0	1–3	1–2	0–2	0–1	1–1	0–1
Dorchester Town	0–1	4–3	1–0	0–0	1–1		3–1	0–7	2–1	1–1	3–1	1–1	4–2	2–0	1–0	4–1	2–3	2–2	0–2	3–2	2–3	4–1
Eastbourne Borough	2–0	1–1	4–1	1–2	1–4	3–2		2–2	1–2	1–0	4–2	1–2	0–0	1–1	1–0	1–2	1–0	2–2	4–0	0–1	3–0	4–2
Grays Athletic	0–1	3–0	6–0	1–2	4–0	2–2	1–1		3–0	1–0	5–1	4–0	4–0	5–0	0–0	4–1	2–0	5–1	2–1	4–2	2–0	2–0
Havant & Waterlooville	5–1	0–4	0–0	0–2	4–1	4–0	2–1	1–2		0–0	4–1	2–1	2–1	3–1	1–0	1–0	1–1	2–3	0–2	2–3	3–2	1–0
Hayes	0–1	2–3	0–1	4–0	1–3	0–1	1–1	1–1	1–5		1–1	3–2	2–1	1–0	3–1	1–0	3–2	1–0	1–3	1–1	1–0	1–3
Hornchurch	6–0	3–1	1–1	0–1	2–2	2–3	2–0	1–2	4–0	1–1		3–2	6–0	1–0	1–1	2–0	1–1	3–0	0–1	0–5	3–2	2–1
Lewes	0–0	2–1	2–1	2–2	1–1	3–1	1–0	3–2	3–1	3–2	1–2		0–1	7–3	2–2	5–4	1–2	0–1	1–1	2–1	3–1	0–0
Maidenhead United	1–1	2–2	2–3	1–5	4–0	0–1	1–2	0–3	1–0	1–1	2–2	1–0		2–4	0–2	4–3	3–3	2–2	0–3	2–1	0–0	2–3
Margate	2–1	1–0	2–3	0–2	0–1	1–2	2–1	0–6	5–1	3–1	0–1	1–1	2–0		1–1	2–0	2–3	1–1	2–1	1–2	2–0	0–1
Newport County	0–1	6–3	1–0	0–1	0–1	3–2	1–3	1–4	1–1	1–1	2–2	2–2	2–1	2–0		2–3	1–0	2–4	1–2	4–1	2–2	2–0
Redbridge	0–3	1–1	1–2	0–0	1–3	4–1	0–3	1–3	3–1	0–1	0–1	0–1	4–1	2–1	0–5		2–1	0–5	1–2	1–2	1–1	3–2
St Albans City	2–1	2–0	4–0	1–0	3–1	1–1	0–0	1–4	3–1	0–1	4–3	2–3	1–2	3–3	0–1	2–3		1–2	1–3	2–5	1–0	0–3
Sutton United	1–0	0–0	0–0	0–3	4–1	3–2	0–0	0–6	1–1	2–4	1–2	3–5	2–2	2–0	0–0	2–3	1–2		1–2	1–0	1–2	0–3
Thurrock	3–1	1–0	0–5	0–1	2–2	1–2	1–0	2–4	1–3	2–1	1–0	2–0	1–2	1–2	2–2	1–0	1–2	1–2		1–1	3–1	2–1
Welling United	0–1	0–0	1–1	0–2	4–0	1–4	0–3	1–2	0–1	1–1	1–1	1–0	1–2	1–0	3–1	1–2	2–3	3–2	1–2		1–1	0–1
Weston-super-Mare	2–1	2–1	2–1	2–1	1–1	2–2	0–2	2–0	2–1	0–1	0–0	1–2	2–1	2–2	3–1	1–0	3–0	2–1	2–1	0–2		2–2
Weymouth	1–1	3–2	2–1	1–2	2–2	1–1	0–1	1–1	3–2	3–1	2–0	3–3	3–1	2–2	0–1	1–0	1–0	1–1	1–2	0–3	1–1	

Updated to match(es) played on unknown. Source: Sky Sports Football Yearbook 2005–2006. Glenda Rollin & Jack Rollin (eds.). Headline, 2005.
Legend: Blue = home team win; Yellow = draw; Red = away team win.

=== Topscorers ===
Pos	Player	Club	Goals
1	(England) Luke Nightingale	Bognor Regis	32
2	(Northern Ireland) Lee Clarke	St Albans City	25
3	(England) Matt Groves	Dorchester	24
4	(England) Dean Holdsworth	Havant & Waterlooville	23
5	(England) Paul Booth	Welling United	20

== North/South play-offs ==
Quarter-finals
2nd	Nuneaton Borough	1 (2)
5th	Altrincham ( pen.)	1 (4)
3rd	Droylsden	1
4th	Kettering Town	2
2nd	Cambridge City	WO
(Note: Lewes could not take part in the play-offs as their ground was not passed fit for promotion to the Conference National, and Cambridge City thus went through on a walkover.)	—
3rd	Thurrock	2
5th	Eastbourne Borough	4

Semi-finals
4th	Kettering Town	2
5th	Altrincham	3
2nd	Cambridge City	0
5th	Eastbourne Borough	3

Finals
5th	Altrincham	2
5th	Eastbourne Borough	1
