= 2009–10 Torquay United F.C. season =

Torquay United
2009–10 season
- Chairman: Alex Rowe (until 5 September 2009); Simon Baker (from 5 September 2009)
- Manager: Paul Buckle
- League Two: 17th
- FA Cup: Third round
- League Cup: First round
- League Trophy: Second round
- Top goalscorer: League: Scott Rendell (12); All: Elliot Benyon (15)
- Highest home attendance: 5,124 v Notts County, 8 May 2010 (League Two)
- Lowest home attendance: 2,122 v Cheltenham Town, 1 Dec 2009 (League Two)
- Average home league attendance: 2,855
Home colours	Away colours

The 2009–10 Torquay United F.C. season was Torquay United's 74th season in the Football League and their first season in League Two after being promoted from the Conference National. The season runs from 1 July 2009 to 30 June 2010.

== Overview ==
Despite a 2–0 win over Chesterfield providing an encouraging start to the season, the Gulls soon stumbled upon a run of bad form which saw them play eleven games in League Two without a win. They had slightly more success in the early rounds of the cup competitions; aside from an early exit to Crystal Palace in the Carling Cup, Torquay enjoyed emphatic 3–1 victories over Cheltenham Town in the first rounds of both the FA Cup and Johnstone Paints Trophy. But, while they were beaten on penalties in the second round of the latter competition by eventual winners Southampton, the Gulls were finally knocked out in the third round of the FA Cup by Brighton after achieving a convincing 4–0 win against Stockport County in the second round.

With relegation from League Two still a real threat in late March, Torquay finally found the winning formula at just the right time, winning six and drawing two of their last eight games. The most impressive display during this run was a 5–0 thrashing of league leaders Rochdale at Plainmoor, a result which earned Torquay the F&C Investments Performance Of The Week Award from the League Managers Association. The dramatic upturn in the Gulls' on-field performances meant that their league survival was assured with three games to spare following a 3–0 victory away to relegation rivals Grimsby Town. Remarkably, Torquay managed to keep a clean sheet in all of their last seven games of the season and, in the process, set a new club record of 691 minutes played without conceding a goal.

== League statistics ==
=== League Two ===
Pos	Team	Pld	W	D	L	GF	GA	GD	Pts
15	Accrington Stanley	46	18	7	21	62	74	−12	61
16	Hereford United	46	17	8	21	54	65	−11	59
17	Torquay United	46	14	15	17	64	55	+9	57
18	Crewe Alexandra	46	15	10	21	68	73	−5	55
19	Macclesfield Town	46	12	18	16	49	58	−9	54

Updated to match(es) played on unknown. Source: football-league.co.uk

==== Results summary ====
Overall								Home						Away					
Pld	W	D	L	GF	GA	GD	Pts	W	D	L	GF	GA	GD	W	D	L	GF	GA	GD
46	14	15	17	64	55	+9	57	9	6	8	34	24	+10	5	9	9	30	31	−1

Source: Torquay United

==== Results by round ====
Round	1	2	3	4	5	6	7	8	9	10	11	12	13	14	15	16	17	18	19	20	21	22	23	24	25	26	27	28	29	30	31	32	33	34	35	36	37	38	39	40	41	42	43	44	45	46
Ground	H	A	A	H	A	H	A	H	A	H	H	A	H	A	H	A	H	A	H	A	H	H	A	A	H	A	H	A	A	H	A	A	H	H	A	H	H	A	H	A	H	A	A	H	A	H
Result	W	L	W	L	L	L	L	L	L	D	D	D	D	D	W	D	L	D	W	L	W	W	L	L	L	D	L	D	L	L	D	D	W	D	W	D	L	L	W	D	W	W	W	W	W	D
Position	5	10	6	11	15	17	18	22	23	23	23	23	22	22	22	22	22	22	20	21	19	17	19	19	21	20	20	21	21	21	21	22	20	20	19	21	21	21	21	21	21	19	19	18	16	17

Source: Torquay United
A = Away; H = Home; W = Win; D = Draw; L = Loss

== Results ==
=== League Two ===
8 Aug 2009	Torquay United	2–0	Chesterfield	Plainmoor
15:00 BST	Rendell 15'; Mansell 71'	Report		Attendance: 3,966; Referee: James Linington

15 Aug 2009	Dagenham & Redbridge	5–3	Torquay United	Victoria Road
15:00 BST	Gain 18'; Green 55' 56'; Scott 66'; Thomas 90+5'	Report	Todd (yellow card) 60'; Wroe 62' (pen.); Benyon 81'; Hargreaves (yellow card) 86'; Carayol 87'	Attendance: 1,824; Referee: Danny McDermid

18 Aug 2009	Burton Albion	0–2	Torquay United	Pirelli Stadium
19:45 BST		Report	Rendell 26'; Hargreaves (yellow card) 35'; Benyon 37'; Charnock (yellow card) 88'	Attendance: 2,670; Referee: Craig Pawson

22 Aug 2009	Torquay United	0–1	Barnet	Plainmoor
15:00 BST	Todd (yellow card) 26'; Carayol (yellow card) 86'	Report	Adomah 26'; O'Neill (yellow card) 64'; Furlong (yellow card) 88'	Attendance: 2,856; Referee: Gavin Ward

29 Aug 2009	Bradford City	2–0	Torquay United	Valley Parade
15:00 BST	Hanson 45+1'; Brandon 90+1'	Report	Robertson (yellow card) 15'	Attendance: 11,123; Referee: Steve Rushton

5 Sep 2009	Torquay United	1–2	Bournemouth	Plainmoor
15:00 BST	Todd 64'; Wroe (yellow card) 65'; Nicholson (yellow card) 83'	Report	Pitman (yellow card) 46' (goal) 49'; Fletcher 87'	Attendance: 3,881; Referee: Darren Sheldrake

12 Sep 2009	Rochdale	2–1	Torquay United	Spotland Stadium
15:00 BST	Dagnall 25' 76'	Report	Robertson (yellow card) 37'; Hargreaves 90+1'	Attendance: 2,407; Referee: Peter Quinn

19 Sep 2009	Torquay United	0–2	Grimsby Town	Plainmoor
15:00 BST	Poke (yellow card) 70'	Report	Linwood (yellow card) 33'; Nicholson 47' (o.g.); Sweeney 65'	Attendance: 2,575; Referee: Oliver Langford

26 Sep 2009	Macclesfield Town	2–1	Torquay United	Moss Rose
15:00 BST	Daniel (yellow card) 30'; Bencherif 61' 68'	Report	Carlisle (yellow card) 46'; Benyon 51'	Attendance: 1,745; Referee: Neil Swarbrick

29 Sep 2009	Torquay United	1–1	Aldershot Town	Plainmoor
19:45 BST	Sills 84' (yellow card) 73' (yellow-red card) 87'	Report	Morgan 48' (pen.); Chalmers (yellow card) 52'	Attendance: 2,271; Referee: Keith Hill

3 Oct 2009	Torquay United	1–1	Bury	Plainmoor
15:00 BST	Ellis (yellow card) 17'; Benyon 59'; Robertson (yellow card) 65'	Report	Cresswell (yellow card) 13'; Jones 38'; Dawson (yellow card) 72'; Sodje (yellow card) 78'	Attendance: 2,524; Referee: Simon Hooper

11 Oct 2009	Notts County	2–2	Torquay United	Meadow Lane
17:15 BST	Westcarr 12'; Davies 33'; Hughes (yellow card) 75'	Report	Ellis 43'; Sills (yellow card) 63' (goal) 77'	Attendance: 8,812; Referee: Andy Penn

17 Oct 2009	Torquay United	2–2	Morecambe	Plainmoor
15:00 BST	Wroe 19' (pen.); Rendell (yellow card) 44'; Carlisle 54'	Report	Adams (yellow card) 14'; Duffy 24' (yellow card) 90+3'; Jevons (yellow card) 45+2'; Mullin 47'; Craney (yellow card) 74'	Attendance: 2,614; Referee: Pat Miller

24 Oct 2009	Lincoln City	0–0	Torquay United	Sincil Bank
15:00 BST	Baker (yellow card) 65'	Report	Hargreaves (yellow card) 27'	Attendance: 3,604; Referee: Danny McDermid

31 Oct 2009	Torquay United	1–0	Northampton Town	Plainmoor
15:00 BST	Charnock (yellow card) 16'; Thomson (yellow card) 41'; Hargreaves 83'	Report	Johnson (yellow card) 66'; Gilligan (yellow card) 85'	Attendance: 2,732; Referee: Phil Gibbs

14 Nov 2009	Shrewsbury Town	1–1	Torquay United	New Meadow
15:00 GMT	Murray (yellow card) 26'; Hibbert 81'	Report	Mansell (yellow card) 43'; Charnock (red card) 54'; Hargreaves 76'; Poke (yellow card) 78'	Attendance: 5,072; Referee: Graham Scott

21 Nov 2009	Torquay United	0–2	Rotherham United	Plainmoor
15:00 GMT	Wroe (yellow card) 23'; Thompson (yellow card) 55'	Report	Lynch (yellow card) 22'; Ellison 85'; Le Fondre 90+4'	Attendance: 2,551; Referee: Andy Hall

24 Nov 2009	Port Vale	2–2	Torquay United	Vale Park
19:45 GMT	Loft 11'; Taylor 76'	Report	Wroe 17'; Mansell (yellow card) 30'; Rendell 67'; Smith (yellow card) 80'; Wroe (yellow card) 90+2'	Attendance: 3,996; Referee: Jon Moss

1 Dec 2009	Torquay United	3–0	Cheltenham Town	Plainmoor
19:45 GMT	Zebroski 8'; Rendell 38'; Thomson 48'; Ellis (yellow card) 51'	Report	Labadie (yellow card) 51'; Pipe (yellow card) 76'	Attendance: 2,122; Referee: Chris Sarginson

5 Dec 2009	Accrington Stanley	4–2	Torquay United	Crown Ground
15:00 GMT	Edwards 39' (pen.); Procter 40'; Joyce 56'; Grant 70'	Report	Wroe 10' (pen.); Zebroski 82'	Attendance: 1,351; Referee: Andy Woolmer

12 Dec 2009	Torquay United	5–0	Darlington	Plainmoor
15:00 GMT	Zebroski 17' 69'; Carlisle 31'; Rendell 45+3'; Benyon 77'	Report	Collins (yellow card) 5'; Harsley (yellow card) 48'; Smith (yellow card) 80'	Attendance: 2,434; Referee: Kevin Wright

26 Dec 2009	Torquay United	1–0	Hereford United	Plainmoor
15:00 GMT	Smith (yellow card) 11'; Wroe 19' (pen.); Mansell (yellow card) 64'; Poke (yellow card) 90+3'	Report	Mutch (yellow card) 65'; Valentine (yellow card) 74'	Attendance: 3,792; Referee: Steve Tanner

28 Dec 2009	Bournemouth	2–1	Torquay United	Dean Court
15:00 GMT	Goulding (yellow card) 32'; Bradbury (yellow card) 38'; Connell (yellow card) 58'; Partington (yellow card) 70'; Cummings (yellow card) 81'; Feeney 84'; Pitman 90+5' (pen.)	Report	Wroe (yellow card) 23'; Thomson (yellow card) 43'; Carlisle (yellow card) 52'; Mansell (yellow card) 58'; Rendell 63'; Smith (yellow card) 72'; Robertson (yellow card) 88'; Poke (yellow card) 90'	Attendance: 7,626; Referee: Jarnail Singh

16 Jan 2010	Chesterfield	1–0	Torquay United	Saltergate
15:00 GMT	Niven (yellow card) 54'; Conlon 72'; Boden (yellow card) 88'	Report	Hargreaves (yellow card) 82'	Attendance: 3,215; Referee: Andy Haines

23 Jan 2010	Torquay United	2–3	Burton Albion	Plainmoor
15:00 GMT	Rendell 8'; Robertson 15' (yellow card) 69'; Hargreaves (yellow card) 65'; Smith (yellow card) 88'	Report	Penn 31' (yellow card) 35'; Harrad 56'; Taylor 84'	Attendance: 2,629; Referee: David Phillips

26 Jan 2010	Barnet	1–1	Torquay United	Underhill Stadium
19:45 GMT	Sawyer 15'; Breen (yellow card) 87'; Jarrett (yellow card) 88'	Report	Furlong 85' (o.g.)	Attendance: 1,331; Referee: Trevor Kettle

30 Jan 2010	Torquay United	1–2	Bradford City	Plainmoor
15:00 GMT	Robertson 15'; Zebroski (yellow card) 52'; Benyon (yellow card) 90+3'	Report	Ramsden (yellow card) 11'; Williams (yellow card) 43'; Evans 82' 90'; Clarke (yellow card) 90+4'	Attendance: 2,592; Referee: Roger East

2 Feb 2010	Crewe Alexandra	1–1	Torquay United	Alexandra Stadium
19:45 GMT	Miller 90+1'	Report	Zebroski 7'	Attendance: 3,421; Referee: Paul Tierney

6 Feb 2010	Hereford United	1–0	Torquay United	Edgar Street
15:00 GMT	McCallum 22'; Jones (yellow card) 69'	Report	Thompson (yellow card) 1'; Cox (yellow card) 66'; Benyon (yellow card) 80'; Wroe (yellow card) 87'; Stevens (yellow card) 90+5'	Attendance: 2,123; Referee: Russell Booth

13 Feb 2010	Torquay United	1–2	Port Vale	Plainmoor
15:00 GMT	O'Kane (yellow card) 40'; Benyon 58'	Report	Haldane 42'; Griffith (yellow card) 55'; Richards 67'	Attendance: 2,563; Referee: Graham Scott

19 Feb 2010	Rotherham United	1–1	Torquay United	Don Valley Stadium
19:45 GMT	Harrison 20'; Gunning (yellow card) 32'; Roberts (yellow card) 45+2' (yellow-red card) 90+5'	Report	Benyon 85'	Attendance: 3,339; Referee: Nigel Miller

23 Feb 2010	Cheltenham Town	1–1	Torquay United	Whaddon Road
19:45 GMT	Hayles 34'; Alsop (yellow card) 85'	Report	Ellis (yellow card) 18'; Carayol 89'	Attendance: 2,607; Referee: Karl Evans

27 Feb 2010	Torquay United	2–1	Accrington Stanley	Plainmoor
15:00 GMT	Mansell 50'; Rowe-Turner (yellow card) 87'; Mansell (yellow card) 90+3'; Kempson 90+5' (o.g.)	Report	Edwards (yellow card) 16'; Symes 69'	Attendance: 2,503; Referee: Simon Hooper

2 Mar 2010	Torquay United	0–0	Dagenham & Redbridge	Plainmoor
19:45 GMT	Barnes (yellow card) 18'; Zebroski (yellow card) 85'	Report	McCrory (yellow card) 61'; Gain (yellow card) 90'	Attendance: 2,140; Referee: Steven Cook

6 Mar 2010	Darlington	1–3	Torquay United	The Darlington Arena
15:00 GMT	White (yellow card) 48'; Main 54'	Report	Ellis 10'; Barnes (yellow card) 31'; O'Kane 45+2'; Mansell (yellow card) 66'; Carayol 85'	Attendance: 1,819; Referee: Scott Mathieson

13 Mar 2010	Torquay United	1–1	Crewe Alexandra	Plainmoor
15:00 GMT	Rendell 38'; Zebroski (yellow card) 48'; Carlisle (yellow card) 62'; Mansell (yellow card) 87'	Report	Donaldson 85'	Attendance: 2,507; Referee: Rob Shoebridge

20 Mar 2010	Torquay United	2–3	Lincoln City	Plainmoor
15:00 GMT	Benyon (yellow card) 19'; Wroe 29'; Smith (yellow card) 61'; Zebroski 76'	Report	Somma 9' 57'; Hughton 53' (yellow card) 55'	Attendance: 2,547; Referee: Craig Pawson

27 Mar 2010	Morecambe	2–0	Torquay United	Christie Park
15:00 GMT	Mullin 8'; Roche (yellow card) 14'; Stanley 90'	Report	Ellis (yellow card) 62'; Branston (yellow card) 67'	Attendance: 1,734; Referee: Oliver Langford

3 Apr 2010	Torquay United	2–1	Shrewsbury Town	Plainmoor
15:00 BST	Ellis 47'; Branston (yellow card) 54'; Carayol (yellow card) 60'; Rendell 61'	Report	Cansdell-Sherriff (yellow card) 1'; Bevan 29' (o.g.); Skarz (yellow card) 63'	Attendance: 3,094; Referee: Roger East

5 Apr 2010	Northampton Town	0–0	Torquay United	Sixfields Stadium
15:00 BST	Beckwith (yellow card) 80'; Herbert (yellow card) 85'	Report	Rendell (yellow card) 71'	Attendance: 5,515; Referee: Darren Deadman

10 Apr 2010	Torquay United	5–0	Rochdale	Plainmoor
15:00 BST	Rendell 29'; Benyon 31' 35'; Wroe 62' (pen.); Carayol 77'	Report	Fielding (yellow card) 60'	Attendance: 3,093; Referee: Gary Sutton

13 Apr 2010	Aldershot Town	0–2	Torquay United	Recreation Ground
19:45 BST		Report	Benyon 17'; Rendell 36'	Attendance: 3,652; Referee: Darren Sheldrake

17 Apr 2010	Grimsby Town	0–3	Torquay United	Blundell Park
15:00 BST	Wright (yellow card) 45+1'	Report	Ellis (yellow card) 11'; Wroe 54' (pen.); Benyon 62'; Branston (yellow card) 24' (yellow-red card) 65'; Carayol 71'	Attendance: 5,702; Referee: Graham Salisbury

24 Apr 2010	Torquay United	1–0	Macclesfield Town	Plainmoor
15:00 BST	Wroe 86'	Report		Attendance: 2,570; Referee: Graham Scott

1 May 2010	Bury	0–3	Torquay United	Gigg Lane
15:00 BST	Buchanan (yellow card) 20'; Sodje (yellow card) 45'	Report	Carayol 37'; Mansell (yellow card) 67'; Stevens 87'; Rendell 90'	Attendance: 3,492; Referee: Carl Boyeson

8 May 2010	Torquay United	0–0	Notts County	Plainmoor
15:00 BST	Mansell (yellow card) 16'; Ellis (yellow card) 79'; Charnock (yellow card) 80'	Report	Edwards (yellow card) 28'; Bishop (yellow card) 78'; Rodgers (yellow card) 79'	Attendance: 5,124; Referee: Steve Bratt

=== FA Cup ===
7 Nov 2009 First round	Torquay United	3–1	Cheltenham Town	Plainmoor
15:00 GMT	Wroe 10' (pen.) 19' (pen.) 70' (yellow card) 83'	Report	Lewis 8'; Low (yellow card) 10'; Ridley (red card) 19'	Attendance: 2,370; Referee: Darren Sheldrake

15 Dec 2009 Second round	Stockport County	0–4	Torquay United	Moss Rose ^{[1]}
19:45 GMT	Tansey (yellow card) 62'	Report	Benyon 2' 33' 79'; Rendell 28'	Attendance: 1,690; Referee: Geoff Eltringham

2 Jan 2010 Third round	Torquay United	0–1	Brighton & Hove Albion	Plainmoor
15:00 GMT	Mansell (yellow card) 45'; Hargreaves (yellow card) 65'; Smith (yellow card) 69'	Report	Crofts 77'; Virgo (yellow card) 87'	Attendance: 4,028; Referee: Mike Russell

=== League Cup ===
11 Aug 2009 First round	Crystal Palace	2–1	Torquay United	Selhurst Park
19:30 BST	Ambrose 65' 78' (pen.); Fonte (yellow card) 84'	Report	Robertson (yellow card) 45'; Sills 74'; Todd (yellow card) 87'	Attendance: 3,140; Referee: David Phillips

=== League Trophy ===
1 Sep 2009 First round	Cheltenham Town	1–3	Torquay United	Whaddon Road
19:45 BST	Low 55'; Hayles (yellow card) 60'; Artus (yellow card) 71'	Report	Stevens 6' 45+1'; Benyon 31'; Charnock (yellow card) 56'; Wroe (yellow card) 90'	Attendance: 1,397; Referee: Phil Gibbs

6 Oct 2009 Second round	Southampton	2–2 (5–3 p)	Torquay United	St Mary's Stadium
19:00 BST	James (yellow card) 33'; Davis (yellow card) 42'; Papa Waigo 59' 69'	Report	Sills 21'; Wroe 42' (pen.)	Attendance: 9,319; Referee: Trevor Kettle
	Penalties
	Lambert (penalty scored); Papa Waigo (penalty scored); James (penalty scored); Mills (penalty scored); Wotton (penalty scored)		(penalty scored) Wroe; (penalty scored) Robertson; (penalty missed) Nicholson; (penalty scored) Mansell

=== Friendlies ===
9 Jul 2009	Buckland Athletic	0–4	Torquay United	Homers Heath
19:45 BST		Report	Carayol 23' 42'; Joyce 64' 74'

15 Jul 2009	Torquay United	3–3	Plymouth Argyle	Plainmoor
19:45 BST	Sills 32'; Seip 54' (o.g.); Benyon 90+3'	Report	Fallon 45'; Sawyer 82'; Summerfield 90' (pen.)	Attendance: 2,046

18 Jul 2009	Torquay United	1–4	Bristol Rovers	Plainmoor
15:00 BST	Wroe 28' (pen.)	Report	Swallow 17'; Duffy 18' 41'; Rigg 82'	Attendance: 1,335

23 Jul 2009	Torquay United	0–0	Derby County	Plainmoor
19:45 BST		Report		Attendance: 1,804

25 Jul 2009	Tiverton Town	1–0	Torquay United	Ladysmead
15:00 BST	Morrissey 84'	Report		Attendance: 362

29 Jul 2009	Torquay United	1–0	Brighton & Hove Albion	Plainmoor
19:45 BST	Rendell 37'	Report

31 Jul 2009	Dorchester Town	0–1	Torquay United	Avenue Stadium
19:45 BST		Report	Joyce 81'

=== Devon St Luke's Bowl ===
15 Feb 2010 Second round	Plymouth Parkway	0–6	Torquay United	Plainmoor
19:30 GMT		Report	Ellis 7'; Knight 31'; Carayol 69' (pen.) 74' 80'; Stevens 72'	Attendance: 149; Referee: Adam Bromley

16 Mar 2010 Quarter Final	Bideford	2–1	Torquay United	Bideford Sports Ground
19:45 GMT	Laight 20'; Searle 89'	Report	Carayol 11'	Referee: Adam Hopkins

== Club statistics ==
=== First team appearances ===
No.	Pos	Nat	Player	Total		League Two		FA Cup		League Cup		League Trophy	
No.	Pos	Nat	Player	Apps	Goals	Apps	Goals	Apps	Goals	Apps	Goals	Apps	Goals
1	GK	(England) ENG	Scott Bevan	23	0	17+1	0	2+0	0	1+0	0	2+0	0
2	DF	(England) ENG	Michael Brough	2	0	0+1	0	0+0	0	0+1	0	0+0	0
3	DF	(England) ENG	Kevin Nicholson	33	0	23+4	0	1+2	0	1+0	0	2+0	0
4	DF	(England) ENG	Mark Ellis	29	3	25+2	3	1+0	0	0+0	0	1+0	0
5	DF	(Scotland) SCO	Chris Robertson	50	2	45+0	2	2+0	0	1+0	0	2+0	0
6	DF	(Wales) WAL	Chris Todd	11	1	9+0	1	0+0	0	1+0	0	1+0	0
7	MF	(England) ENG	Lee Mansell	43	2	35+4	2	3+0	0	0+0	0	1+0	0
8	FW	(England) ENG	Tim Sills	24	4	12+6	2	1+2	0	1+0	1	2+0	1
8	FW	(Austria) AUT	Ashley Barnes	6	0	6+0	0	0+0	0	0+0	0	0+0	0
9	FW	(England) ENG	Elliot Benyon	51	15	31+14	11	3+0	3	0+1	0	2+0	1
10	FW	(England) ENG	Scott Rendell	41	13	28+7	12	2+1	1	1+0	0	1+1	0
11	MF	(England) ENG	Nicky Wroe	50	13	45+0	9	2+0	3	1+0	0	2+0	1
12	MF	(England) ENG	Tyrone Thompson	29	0	17+7	0	2+0	0	1+0	0	2+0	0
13	GK	(England) ENG	Martin Rice	0	0	0+0	0	0+0	0	0+0	0	0+0	0
14	MF	(England) ENG	Chris Hargreaves	25	3	21+2	3	2+0	0	0+0	0	0+0	0
15	MF	(Northern Ireland) NIR	Wayne Carlisle	30	2	20+4	2	3+0	0	1+0	0	1+1	0
16	DF	(England) ENG	Lee Hodges	6	0	2+3	0	0+0	0	0+0	0	0+1	0
17	FW	(England) ENG	Matt Green	0	0	0+0	0	0+0	0	0+0	0	0+0	0
18	MF	(The Gambia) GAM	Mustapha Carayol	21	5	11+9	5	0+0	0	0+1	0	0+0	0
19	MF	(England) ENG	Danny Stevens	33	3	16+11	1	0+3	0	1+0	0	1+1	2
20	FW	(England) ENG	Ben Joyce	0	0	0+0	0	0+0	0	0+0	0	0+0	0
21	MF	(England) ENG	Saul Halpin	0	0	0+0	0	0+0	0	0+0	0	0+0	0
22	DF	(England) ENG	Adam Smith	18	0	16+0	0	2+0	0	0+0	0	0+0	0
23	DF	(England) ENG	Kieran Charnock	30	0	22+2	0	3+0	0	1+0	0	2+0	0
24	MF	(England) ENG	Steve Adams	0	0	0+0	0	0+0	0	0+0	0	0+0	0
26	FW	(England) ENG	Ashley Yeoman	0	0	0+0	0	0+0	0	0+0	0	0+0	0
27	MF	(England) ENG	Ryan Beattie	0	0	0+0	0	0+0	0	0+0	0	0+0	0
28	MF	(England) ENG	Scott Taylor	0	0	0+0	0	0+0	0	0+0	0	0+0	0
29	FW	(England) ENG	Chris Zebroski	30	6	30+0	6	0+0	0	0+0	0	0+0	0
30	GK	(England) ENG	Michael Poke	30	0	28+1	0	1+0	0	0+0	0	0+0	0
31	FW	(England) ENG	Danny Mills	2	0	0+2	0	0+0	0	0+0	0	0+0	0
32	MF	(England) ENG	Marvin Williams	4	0	1+3	0	0+0	0	0+0	0	0+0	0
32	MF	(Northern Ireland) NIR	Eunan O'Kane	16	1	5+11	1	0+0	0	0+0	0	0+0	0
33	MF	(Trinidad and Tobago) TTO	Jake Thomson	18	1	13+2	1	3+0	0	0+0	0	0+0	0
34	DF	(England) ENG	Guy Branston	16	0	16+0	0	0+0	0	0+0	0	0+0	0
35	GK	(England) ENG	Grant Fisher	0	0	0+0	0	0+0	0	0+0	0	0+0	0
36	DF	(England) ENG	Lathaniel Rowe-Turner	6	0	5+1	0	0+0	0	0+0	0	0+0	0
37	DF	(Guinea) GUI	Mo Camara	2	0	2+0	0	0+0	0	0+0	0	0+0	0
39	GK	(England) ENG	Steve Collis	1	0	1+0	0	0+0	0	0+0	0	0+0	0
41	MF	(England) ENG	Lloyd Macklin	4	0	3+1	0	0+0	0	0+0	0	0+0	0
50	MF	(England) ENG	Sam Cox	3	0	1+2	0	0+0	0	0+0	0	0+0	0

Source: Torquay United

=== Top scorers ===
Place	Position	Nation	Number	Name	League Two	FA Cup	League Cup	League Trophy	Total
1	FW	(England)	9	Elliot Benyon	11	3	0	1	15
2	FW	(England)	10	Scott Rendell	12	1	0	0	13
=	MF	(England)	11	Nicky Wroe	9	3	0	1	13
4	FW	(England)	29	Chris Zebroski	6	0	0	0	6
=	MF	(The Gambia)	18	Mustapha Carayol	6	0	0	0	6
6	FW	(England)	8	Tim Sills	2	0	1	1	4
7	DF	(England)	4	Mark Ellis	3	0	0	0	3
=	MF	(England)	14	Chris Hargreaves	3	0	0	0	3
=	MF	(England)	19	Danny Stevens	1	0	0	2	3
10	MF	(Northern Ireland)	15	Wayne Carlisle	2	0	0	0	2
=	MF	(England)	7	Lee Mansell	2	0	0	0	2
=	DF	(England)	5	Chris Robertson	2	0	0	0	2
13	MF	(Northern Ireland)	32	Eunan O'Kane	1	0	0	0	1
=	MF	(Trinidad and Tobago)	33	Jake Thomson	1	0	0	0	1
=	DF	(Wales)	6	Chris Todd	1	0	0	0	1
				Own goals	2	0	0	0	2
				TOTALS	64	7	1	5	77

Source: Torquay United

=== Disciplinary record ===
Number	Nation	Position	Name	League Two		FA Cup		League Cup		League Trophy		Total	
Number	Nation	Position	Name	Yellow card	Red card	Yellow card	Red card	Yellow card	Red card	Yellow card	Red card	Yellow card	Red card
7	(England)	MF	Lee Mansell	8	0	1	0	0	0	0	0	9	0
11	(England)	MF	Nicky Wroe	5	0	1	0	0	0	1	0	7	0
4	(England)	DF	Mark Ellis	6	0	0	0	0	0	0	0	6	0
14	(England)	MF	Chris Hargreaves	5	0	1	0	0	0	0	0	6	0
5	(Scotland)	DF	Chris Robertson	5	0	0	0	1	0	0	0	6	0
22	(England)	DF	Adam Smith	5	0	1	0	0	0	0	0	6	0
23	(England)	DF	Kieran Charnock	3	1	0	0	0	0	1	0	4	1
15	(Northern Ireland)	MF	Wayne Carlisle	4	0	0	0	0	0	0	0	4	0
34	(England)	DF	Guy Branston	3	1	0	0	0	0	0	0	3	1
9	(England)	FW	Elliot Benyon	3	0	0	0	0	0	0	0	3	0
6	(Wales)	DF	Chris Todd	3	0	0	0	0	0	0	0	3	0
29	(England)	FW	Chris Zebroski	3	0	0	0	0	0	0	0	3	0
8	(England)	FW	Tim Sills	2	1	0	0	0	0	0	0	2	1
8	(Austria)	FW	Ashley Barnes	2	0	0	0	0	0	0	0	2	0
18	(The Gambia)	MF	Mustapha Carayol	2	0	0	0	0	0	0	0	2	0
10	(England)	FW	Scott Rendell	2	0	0	0	0	0	0	0	2	0
12	(England)	MF	Tyrone Thompson	2	0	0	0	0	0	0	0	2	0
33	(Trinidad and Tobago)	MF	Jake Thomson	2	0	0	0	0	0	0	0	2	0
34	(Northern Ireland)	MF	Eunan O'Kane	1	0	0	0	0	0	0	0	1	0
19	(England)	MF	Danny Stevens	1	0	0	0	0	0	0	0	1	0
			TOTALS	67	3	4	0	1	0	2	0	74	3

Source: Torquay United

=== Transfers ===
==== In ====
Date	Nat.	Pos.	Name	From	Fee	References
10 July 2009	(England)	FW	Ben Joyce	Swindon Town	Free	
5 August 2009	(England)	DF	Kieran Charnock	Peterborough United	Undisclosed	
1 September 2009	(England)	MF	Marvin Williams	Brentford	Undisclosed	
6 January 2010	(England)	FW	Chris Zebroski	Wycombe Wanderers	£25,000	
11 January 2010	(Northern Ireland)	MF	Eunan O'Kane	Coleraine	Free	
1 February 2010	(England)	DF	Lathaniel Rowe-Turner	Leicester City	Undisclosed	
11 February 2010	(Guinea)	DF	Mo Camara	St Mirren	Free	
24 May 2010	(England)	DF	Ed Palmer	Trainee	n/a	
24 May 2010	(England)	FW	Ashley Yeoman	Trainee	n/a	
27 May 2010	(England)	GK	Danny Potter	Unattached	n/a	
3 June 2010	(Northern Ireland)	FW	Billy Kee	Unattached	n/a	
30 June 2010	(England)	MF	Lloyd Macklin	Unattached	n/a	

==== Out ====
Date	Nat.	Pos.	Name	From	Fee	References
29 September 2009	(England)	GK	Martin Rice	Truro City	Free	
4 December 2009	(England)	MF	Marvin Williams	Released	n/a	
15 January 2010	(England)	FW	Tim Sills	Stevenage Borough	Undisclosed	
28 January 2010	(England)	MF	Chris Hargreaves	Oxford United	Free	
14 May 2010	(England)	MF	Steve Adams	Released	n/a	
14 May 2010	(England)	DF	Michael Brough	Released	n/a	
14 May 2010	(Guinea)	DF	Mo Camara	Released	n/a	
14 May 2010	(England)	DF	Lee Hodges	Released	n/a	
14 May 2010	(England)	FW	Ben Joyce	Released	n/a	
14 May 2010	(England)	MF	Tyrone Thompson	Released	n/a	
14 May 2010	(Wales)	DF	Chris Todd	Released	n/a	
20 May 2010	(The Gambia)	MF	Mustapha Carayol	Lincoln City	£35,000	
2 June 2010	(England)	FW	Matt Green	Oxford City	Undisclosed	

==== Loans in ====
Date	Nat.	Pos.	Name	From	Fee	References
28 July 2009	(England)	FW	Scott Rendell	Peterborough United	End of season	
1 September 2009	(England)	GK	Michael Poke	Southampton	End of season	
17 September 2009	(England)	FW	Danny Mills	Peterborough United	21 October 2009	
27 October 2009	(Trinidad and Tobago)	MF	Jake Thomson	Southampton	End of season	
20 November 2009	(England)	DF	Adam Smith	Tottenham Hotspur	End of season	
20 November 2009	(England)	FW	Chris Zebroski	Wycombe Wanderers	6 January 2010	
22 January 2010	(England)	MF	Sam Cox	Tottenham Hotspur	11 February 2010	
29 January 2010	(England)	DF	Guy Branston	Burton Albion	End of season	
9 February 2010	(Austria)	FW	Ashley Barnes	Plymouth Argyle	11 March 2010	
19 February 2010	(England)	MF	Lloyd Macklin	Swindon Town	21 March 2010	
6 May 2010	(England)	GK	Steve Collis	Bristol City	13 May 2010	

==== Loans out ====
Date	Nat.	Pos.	Name	From	Fee	References
18 August 2009	(England)	DF	Mark Ellis	Forest Green Rovers	15 September 2009	
18 August 2009	(England)	MF	Steve Adams	Forest Green Rovers	15 September 2009	
29 August 2009	(England)	GK	Martin Rice	Truro City	29 September 2009	
17 September 2009	(The Gambia)	MF	Mustapha Carayol	Kettering Town	10 December 2009	
25 September 2009	(England)	DF	Michael Brough	Stevenage Borough	25 October 2009	
1 October 2009	(England)	FW	Ben Joyce	Weston-super-Mare	End of season	
9 October 2009	(England)	DF	Lee Hodges	Truro City	End of season	
12 October 2009	(England)	MF	Steve Adams	Truro City	End of season	
4 November 2009	(England)	DF	Michael Brough	Mansfield Town	End of season	
26 November 2009	(Wales)	DF	Chris Todd	Salisbury City	1 January 2010	
9 January 2010	(Wales)	DF	Chris Todd	Newport County	End of season	

== Notes ==
^{1} . This match was played at a neutral venue due to the poor state of the pitch at Stockport's Edgeley Park ground.
