= Ben Joyce =

Ben Joyce may refer to:

- Ben Joyce (actor), Welsh actor
- Ben Joyce (baseball) (born 2000), American baseball pitcher
- Ben Joyce (footballer) (born 1989), English footballer
