= 2009–10 Tottenham Hotspur F.C. season =

English football club season

Tottenham Hotspur F.C.
2009–10 season
- Chairman: Daniel Levy
- Manager: Harry Redknapp
- Stadium: White Hart Lane
- Premier League: 4th
- FA Cup: Semi-finals
- League Cup: Quarter-finals
- Top goalscorer: League: Jermain Defoe (18); All: Jermain Defoe (24)
- Highest home attendance: 36,041 vs. Arsenal
- Lowest home attendance: 35,318 vs. Birmingham City
- Average home league attendance: 35,794
Home colours	Away colours	Third colours

The 2009–10 season was the 128th season in the history of Tottenham Hotspur Football Club, their 32nd consecutive season in the top flight of English football and their 18th consecutive season in the FA Premier League. The club also participated in the FA Cup and the Football League Cup.

Tottenham began the season under manager Harry Redknapp, in his first full season at the club, he signed 7 new players during the two transfer windows with 16 players leaving White Hart Lane throughout the season.

Tottenham accumulated 70 points to take fourth place, at the time the club's highest ranked Premier League finish (before finishing second under Pochettino in the 2016–17 season), and competed in the UEFA Champions League for the first time in their history. The last time they competed in the top level of European club football was during the 1961–62 season.

Tottenham Hotspur had an average home attendance of 35,794, which was the ninth-highest in the Premier League for the second season running.

== Season 2009–2010 ==
=== Transfers ===
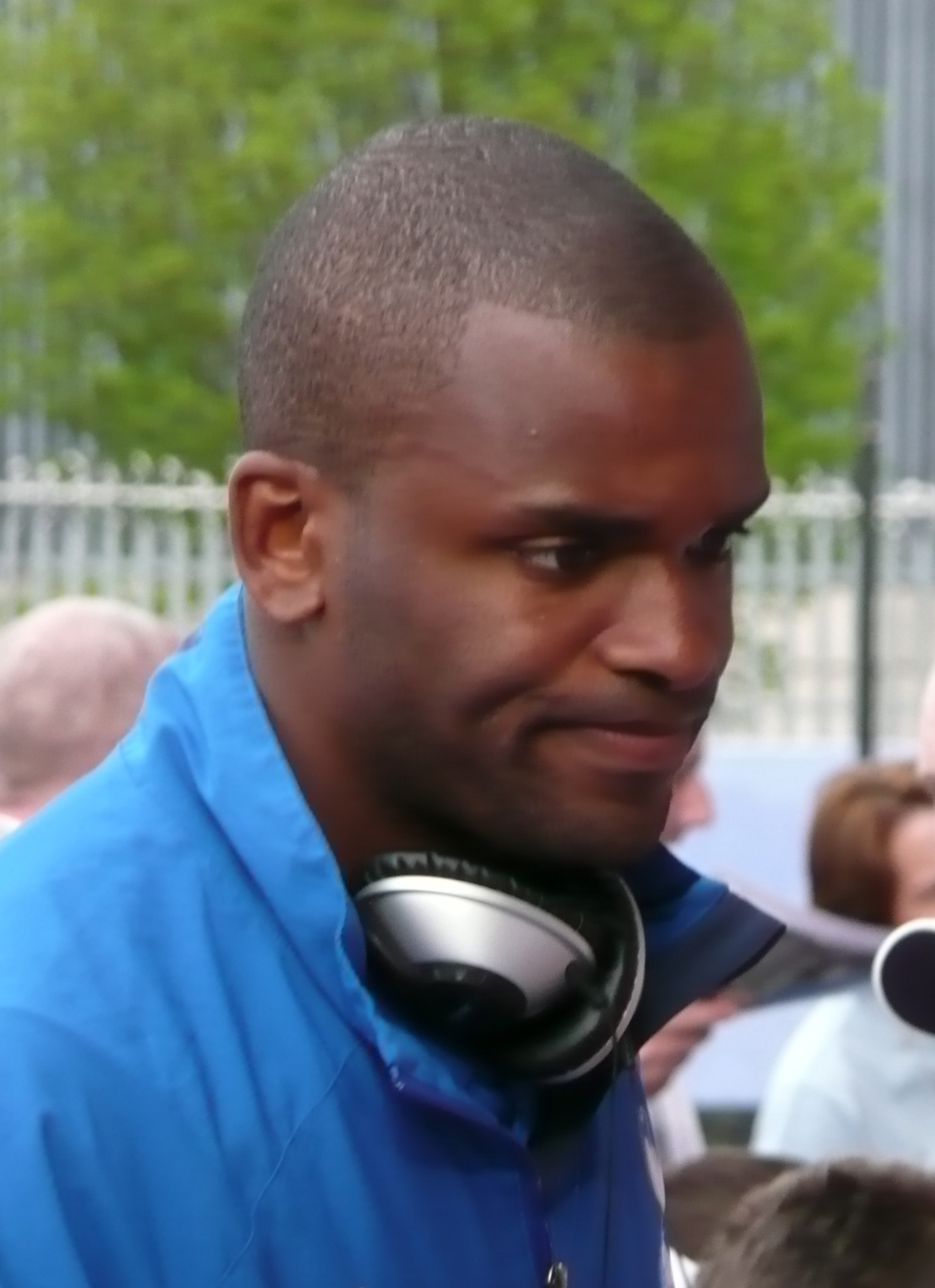
Darren Bent eventually moved to Sunderland after a protracted negotiation period

Tottenham's transfer involvement began on the first day of the newly opened transfer window, with the release of several reserve and youth players, the most notable being former Portuguese international Ricardo Rocha, who in late August joined Belgian outfit Standard Liège. Tottenham's outgoing transfers continued into July, as defensive midfielder Didier Zokora joined Sevilla for around £8.6 million, swiftly followed by Welsh international right-back Chris Gunter making a £1.75 million move to Nottingham Forest, following his loan spell with them at the end of the 2008–09 season. Also, Brazilian left-back Gilberto ended his spell at Spurs, moving back to Cruzeiro in the Brasileirão.

The first acquisitions made in the summer transfer window were the signings of youngsters Kyle Naughton and Kyle Walker, both from Sheffield United. Naughton moved straight into the first team, receiving the number 16 shirt, whereas Walker received a loan move back to Sheffield United for a year to continue his development at the Championship club.

Tottenham's largest transfer fee of the summer was spent signing Peter Crouch back to the club from Portsmouth. Crouch began his career at White Hart Lane before a move to Queens Park Rangers ended his time at Spurs, but with a move of around £9 million, he became the fourth player to make a return to Spurs after leaving in the past six months. The money spent on Crouch was recouped by the sale of striker Darren Bent; Bent entered into a protracted transfer deal with Sunderland which was threatened not only by the large bid lodged from Stoke City during negotiations but also by comments made by Bent on his Twitter page criticising chairman Daniel Levy, to which he made a public apology. Bent joined Sunderland for £10 million.

Tottenham's summer continued with the arrival of Sébastien Bassong from Newcastle United for £8 million. During their pre-season, Spurs were hit with the double blow of losing both Jonathan Woodgate and Michael Dawson to serious injury and Ledley King struggling on and off with some injuries. The transfer priorities were on the defence, which followed from the arrival of Bassong.

Pre-Season

Tottenham began their pre-season schedule on 15 July 2009 with an away trip to St. James Park to face Exeter City. Tottenham won the encounter 3–0 against their League One opponents. A first-half goal from Jamie O'Hara set Spurs on their way before two goals in ten minutes from Aaron Lennon and Darren Bent ensured Tottenham's pre-season began with a winning start. Two days later, Tottenham took a southwest trip by facing both Harry Redknapp and Kevin Bond's former club, AFC Bournemouth. Tottenham replicated their result by running out 3–0 winners. Robbie Keane got his first goal of the pre-season campaign halfway through the first half, followed by a goal from Jermain Defoe, returning to his former club with whom he had a successful loan period in the 2000–01 season. The game was rounded off by a goal from Wilson Palacios, scoring his first-ever goal in English football.

Tottenham continued their pre-season by facing newly promoted Championship side Peterborough United at the London Road. Spurs ended the match having won 4–0 with goals scored by Darren Bent, Jermain Defoe, Luka Modrić and Roman Pavlyuchenko, taking their tally to ten goals scored in three games and zero conceded.

Beginning in late July, Spurs participated in the Wembley Cup. They began the tournament by facing off against Barcelona who were being managed by Pep Guardiola. Barcelona fielded a changed team, featuring several young players, Barcelona had the better of the first half, taking the lead through forward Bojan. Tottenham improved in the second half and earned a draw with a late header through youngster Jake Livermore. The game against Barcelona ending in a 1–1 draw. In the final game of the tournament, Spurs faced Scottish club Celtic. Tottenham suffered their first friendly loss in five years by losing 2–0. An early header from Chris Killen put Celtic 1–0 up before Celtic got their second through Georgios Samaras, a solo run earned the two-goal cushion and eventually the win to claim the Wembley Cup. Egyptian champions Al Ahly were also a part of the tournament but were not an opponent of Spurs and finished bottom of the final group standings.

Following the Wembley Cup, Tottenham competed in the 2009 Asia Trophy Tournament alongside fellow Premier League outfits West Ham United, Hull City and Chinese Super League team Beijing Guoan. Tottenham started the tournament against West Ham, winning 1–0. Goalkeeper Robert Green made several saves before ex-West Ham player Jermain Defoe returned to haunt his former club with a finish from close range to send Spurs to the final. Tottenham then claimed the Trophy with a 3–0 win over Hull City. Robbie Keane claimed two goals, one from open play and one from the penalty spot, and Aaron Lennon wrapped up the game with a tap-in, supplied by new signing Kyle Naughton.

The Far-East section of the 2009–10 pre-season was then rounded off with a trip to Hong Kong to play the Hong Kong First Division champions South China. Tottenham lost the match 2–0, South China took the lead through Chan Siu Ki with a 30-yard volley before Li Haiqiang sealed the game from the penalty spot, with South China goalkeeper Zhang Chunhui producing several saves to deny Tottenham any sort of comeback.

Tottenham completed their 2009–10 pre-season by beating Greek opposition Olympiacos 3–0. Spurs gave debuts to Peter Crouch and Sébastien Bassong and took the lead in the second half thanks to Roman Pavlyuchenko's left-footed strike. Vedran Ćorluka's first goal for Spurs put daylight between the two teams and then a solo run from Jermain Defoe made the game safe at 3–0 and ended their only home fixture of the pre-season with a win.

=== August ===
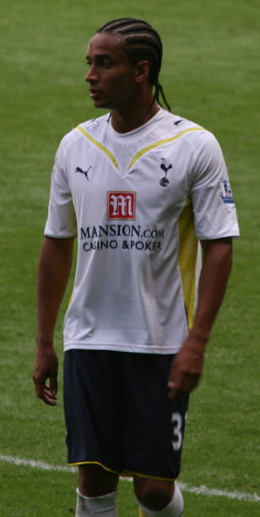
Benoît Assou-Ekotto scored Tottenham's first goal of the season

Tottenham began the 2009–10 season with their first home start in five years against Liverpool. Spurs took the lead before half-time with a thunderbolt effort from unlikely goal scorer Benoît Assou-Ekotto. Liverpool equalised in the second half thanks to a penalty from Steven Gerrard but Tottenham won all three points with a header from Sébastien Bassong on his debut. Tottenham followed up on the Liverpool win with a 5–1 thrashing of Hull City at the KC Stadium. Spurs moved in front in just ten minutes with a strike from Jermain Defoe, followed soon after by Wilson Palacios, who scored his first league goal in English football to give Spurs a two-goal cushion. Further goals from Robbie Keane and another two Defoe goals – to earn his first hat-trick since 2004 – completed the scoring.

Spurs then faced London rivals West Ham in a scrappy affair. West Ham took the lead through a Carlton Cole volley, however only minutes later, Cole misplaced a pass directly into the path of Jermain Defoe to give Tottenham a way back into the game. Spurs then took all three points when Aaron Lennon cut in from the right to slam the ball past Robert Green late in the game. Three wins out of the first three games produced Tottenham's most successful start to a season since the double-winning team of 1961 and left them topping the table after the first three games of the season.

The League Cup then took center stage as Tottenham took on Doncaster Rovers in the second round. Spurs eased their way to a 5–1 victory over their lower league opponents, with the additional bonus of five different goal scorers: strikes from Tom Huddlestone, Jamie O'Hara, Peter Crouch, David Bentley and Roman Pavlyuchenko sealed the win and passage to the next round. In the ensuing draw, it was announced that Tottenham would face Preston North End in the third round of the cup.

Tottenham's final game of August was against newly promoted Birmingham City. Spurs battled their way to a 2–1 win, with Crouch scoring his first league goal for the Spurs before a Lee Bowyer tap-in made the game 1–1. The match looked to be heading for a draw before Aaron Lennon scored the winner in the fifth minute of injury time. The game was marred for Spurs, however, as it was confirmed that influential midfielder Luka Modrić had suffered a fracture to his fibula, forcing him to miss many weeks in the season.

Nearing the end of August, two players left Spurs for new teams in the Premier League: French defender Pascal Chimbonda left to join Blackburn Rovers in a £2 million deal, while German Kevin-Prince Boateng made a £4 million move to Portsmouth.

Following Tottenham's 2–1 win over Birmingham in which Modrić had suffered a broken leg, Spurs entered transfer window deadline day in pursuit of a midfielder. In the final hours, confirmation was made of the signing of fellow Croatian Niko Kranjčar from Portsmouth for £2.5 million. This transfer was thought to signal the end of Tottenham's transfer movement until on 3 September, it was announced that Spurs had signed veteran goalkeeper Jimmy Walker. Walker was a free agent following his release from West Ham.

Throughout the transfer window, some loans were negotiated. Early in the transfer window, youngsters Ryan Mason and Steven Caulker joined Yeovil Town on loan for six months, followed soon by Adel Taarabt returning to Queens Park Rangers for a season-long loan. The transfers continued, as Troy Archibald-Henville re-joined Exeter City until January 2010, and on the same day, it was revealed that goalkeeper Ben Alnwick would join newly relegated Norwich City for three months. After this, youngster Adam Smith joined Wycombe Wanderers for an initial one-month deal, subsequently followed by the development of the deal to send Andros Townsend to long-term affiliate Leyton Orient for six months. After a good pre-season with Spurs, midfielder Jake Livermore signed for Derby County for a month, later extended it to six months thanks to a series of good performances. Jon Obika joined his fellow Spurs loanees at Yeovil in mid-August, putting pen to paper for an initial one-month loan. The loans continued, with Jamie O'Hara joining Portsmouth until January 2010, followed later by the loan of midfielder Sam Cox to Cheltenham for one month. The last loans of the summer transfer window involved three youth goalkeepers, with David Button, Oscar Jansson and Lee Butcher joining Crewe Alexandra, Exeter City and Grays Athletic respectively.

After Spurs' good start to the season, Harry Redknapp and Jermain Defoe were awarded the Manager of the Month award and the Player of the Month award, respectively, for August.

==== Month summary ====
===== August league table =====
Pos	Team	Pld	W	D	L	GF	GA	GD	Pts	Qualification or relegation
1	Chelsea	4	4	0	0	10	2	+8	12	Group stage
2	Tottenham Hotspur	4	4	0	0	11	4	+7	12	Group stage
3	Manchester United	4	3	0	1	8	2	+6	9	Group stage
4	Manchester City	3	3	0	0	4	0	+4	9	Play-off round
5	Stoke City	4	2	1	1	3	4	−1	7	2010–11 UEFA Europa League Play-off round

Updated to match(es) played on 30 August 2009. Source: Barclays Premier League
Rules for classification: 1) points; 2) goal difference; 3) number of goals scored.

===== August game stats =====
Month	Games	Won	Drew	Lost	Scored	Conceded	Points	Other
August	5	5	0	0	16	5	12	Advanced to League Cup third round

=== September ===
Following the International break, Tottenham entered into a test of their early form, starting with the Champions Manchester United at White Hart Lane. Spurs made a fast start, with Jermain Defoe scoring an overhead kick within the first minute of the game. Manchester United, however, turned the game around, taking all three points thanks to goals from Ryan Giggs, Anderson and Wayne Rooney.

After the first loss of the season, Tottenham then had the challenge of Chelsea at Stamford Bridge, and although Spurs stayed in the game for long periods, they eventually succumbed to a 3–0 defeat. Tottenham had the chance to immediately bounce back in the League Cup facing Championship side Doncaster Rovers. The game played out on even footing with Preston giving as good as they got in the early stage until Tottenham finally got the breakthrough and ended the game with a 5–1 victory with Peter Crouch scoring a hat-trick in the process.

September ended with a home visit of the newly promoted Burnley. Spurs strolled their way to victory with a 5–0 victory, Tottenham had the better of the game, with Robbie Keane scoring four of the goals and ended the month with a win, retaining their place in the top four.

==== Month summary ====
===== September league table =====
Pos	Team	Pld	W	D	L	GF	GA	GD	Pts	Qualification or relegation
1	Manchester United	7	6	0	1	17	6	+11	18	Group stage
2	Chelsea	7	6	0	1	16	6	+10	18	Group stage
3	Liverpool	7	5	0	2	22	10	+12	15	Group stage
4	Tottenham Hotspur	7	5	0	2	17	10	+7	15	Play-off round
5	Manchester City	6	5	0	1	14	7	+7	15	2010–11 UEFA Europa League Play-off round

Updated to match(es) played on 28 September 2009. Source: Barclays Premier League
Rules for classification: 1) points; 2) goal difference; 3) number of goals scored.

===== September game stats =====
Month	Games	Won	Drew	Lost	Scored	Conceded	Points	Other
September	4	2	0	2	11	7	3	Advanced to League Cup fourth round

=== October ===
October for Tottenham Hotspur began with a trip to the Reebok Stadium to face Bolton Wanderers. Bolton took the lead within five minutes when a throw-in landed at the feet of Ricardo Gardner who smashed the ball in the roof of the net. Tottenham battled back to find an equaliser through a Niko Kranjčar volley, Starting with a Wilson Palacios cross, Peter Crouch's downward header was met by the on-rushing Kranjčar to score his first Tottenham Hotspur goal. Early in the second half, slick football from Bolton earned them the lead for the second time, intricate play from Ricardo Gardner and Lee Chung-yong, set up a back-post header for Kevin Davies which squirmed over the line. Spurs rallied late on and struck another equaliser from a Vedran Ćorluka header to earn a point.

Following the draw at Bolton, Tottenham travelled to Fratton Park to play Harry Redknapp's former club, Portsmouth. Portsmouth had started the season very poorly and experiencing off-field trouble involving various owners of the club, Tottenham took the lead early in the game on the 29th-minute mark with Ledley King powering in a header from a Niko Kranjčar Corner, Spurs doubled their lead on half time with Jermain Defoe sliding the ball home from a Jermaine Jenas through-ball. Portsmouth began to battle in the second half and scored a goal through ex-Tottenham player Kevin-Prince Boateng and following Jermain Defoe's red card for a stamp on Aaron Mokoena, a tense finish ensued, however after the injury time sending off of Michael Brown, Tottenham secured the three points.

After two away games, Spurs returned to White Hart Lane to face Stoke City. Tottenham monopolised possession and created many chances which either poor finishing or fantastic goalkeeping, prevented Tottenham from taking the lead. Late in the second half, Spurs went down to ten men after Aaron Lennon sustained an injury and all three allocated substitutions had been made. Stoke took advantage, with substitute Glenn Whelan hammering home the winner for the Potters to claim the maximum points. Tottenham rebounded from the disappointment of the loss three days later with a win over Everton in the League Cup. Goals from Tom Huddlestone and Robbie Keane ensured safe passage into the quarter-finals, to which Spurs were drawn against Manchester United at Old Trafford.

Tottenham ended October with a North London derby against Arsenal at the Emirates Stadium, Spurs entered the game without Luka Modrić, Aaron Lennon and the suspended Jermain Defoe and the absences meant that David Bentley made his first start of the season against his former club. The first half played out on level pegging until late in the half when a crosslet Robin van Persie pokes the ball home to give Arsenal the lead. Immediately following, Poor defending from Spurs allowed Cesc Fàbregas to double Arsenal's lead, just 50 seconds later. Tottenham entered the second half with a mountain to climb, however, the game was over when more poor defending allowed Van Persie to score his second and Arsenal's third. The game ended 3–0 and Spurs ended October in fifth place in the table.

==== Month summary ====
===== October league table =====
Pos	Team	Pld	W	D	L	GF	GA	GD	Pts	Qualification or relegation
1	Chelsea	11	9	0	2	28	8	+20	27	Group stage
2	Manchester United	11	8	1	2	23	11	+12	25	Group stage
3	Arsenal	10	7	1	2	32	13	+19	22	Group stage
4	Manchester City	10	5	4	1	18	11	+7	19	Play-off round
5	Tottenham Hotspur	11	6	1	4	21	17	+4	19	2010–11 UEFA Europa League Play-off round

Updated to match(es) played on 31 October 2009. Source: Barclays Premier League
Rules for classification: 1) points; 2) goal difference; 3) number of goals scored.

===== October game stats =====
Month	Games	Won	Drew	Lost	Scored	Conceded	Points	Other
October	5	2	1	2	6	7	4	Advanced to League Cup Quarter-Final

=== November ===
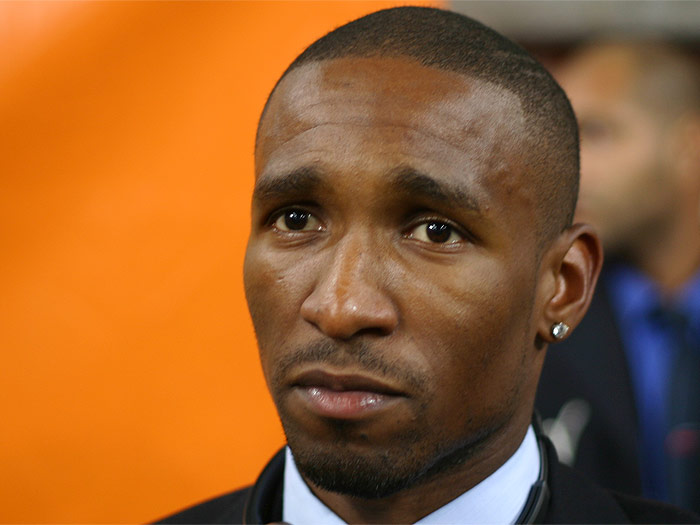
Jermain Defoe scored 5 goals in a game against Wigan Athletic

Looking to respond from losing the most recent edition of the North London derby, Tottenham faced a home test against Sunderland. The game featured the return of some former players. Steed Malbranque, Andy Reid, Márton Fülöp, Fraizer Campbell and Darren Bent, making his first return to the Lane since his acrimonious departure in the summer. The game ended 2–0 to Tottenham thanks to goals from Robbie Keane and Tom Huddlestone, with Darren Bent having a penalty saved during the match.

Following the win against Sunderland, Spurs played Wigan in a home fixture. In what would become a historic fixture, Tottenham won 9–1. Redknapp chose to start with Peter Crouch up front with Defoe, and the move paid off as Spurs took the lead after a Crouch header from an Aaron Lennon cross that put Spurs 1–0 up at half-time. The second half entered the record books as Spurs scored eight goals, five coming from Defoe. Other goals came from Lennon and Niko Kranjčar, along with a David Bentley free-kick, originally given as a Chris Kirkland own goal before the dubious goal panel awarded the effort to Bentley. It became Tottenham's biggest-ever Premier League win, the second biggest in Premier League history, and only the second time any team had scored nine goals in the Premier League since its inception in 1992. Defoe also got himself in the record books, becoming only the third player to score five goals in a Premier League match, the others being Andy Cole and Alan Shearer.

Tottenham ended the month with a trip to Villa Park to face Aston Villa. Early into the first half, Aston Villa drew first blood with Gabriel Agbonlahor poking the ball in from close range to send Villa into the lead. Spurs fought back and in the 78th minute grabbed an equaliser with Michael Dawson hitting a volley into the net from just outside the area, earning a point for Tottenham and lifting the team into third place.

==== Month summary ====
===== November league table =====
Pos	Team	Pld	W	D	L	GF	GA	GD	Pts	Qualification or relegation
1	Chelsea	14	12	0	2	36	8	+28	36	Group stage
2	Manchester United	14	10	1	3	30	13	+17	31	Group stage
3	Tottenham Hotspur	14	8	2	4	33	19	+14	26	Group stage
4	Arsenal	13	8	1	4	36	18	+18	25	Play-off round
5	Liverpool	14	7	2	5	31	20	+11	23	2010–11 UEFA Europa League Play-off round

Updated to match(es) played on 31 November 2009. Source: Barclays Premier League
Rules for classification: 1) points; 2) goal difference; 3) number of goals scored.

===== November game stats =====
Month	Games	Won	Drew	Lost	Scored	Conceded	Points	Other
November	3	2	1	0	12	2	7	N/A

=== December ===
==== Month summary ====
December began with a trip to Old Trafford to face Manchester United in the League Cup quarter-final. Spurs lost 2–0 courtesy of two long-range goals from Darron Gibson to put the incumbent champions into the semi-final at Tottenham's expense.

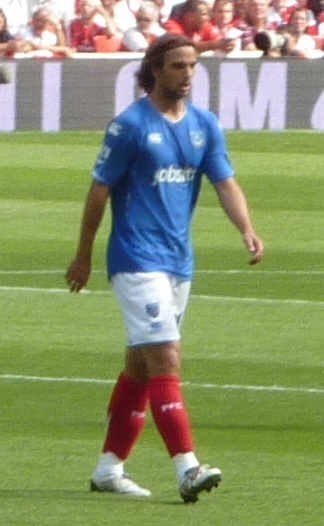
Niko Kranjčar scored two to give Spurs a 3–0 win over rivals Manchester City

Tottenham's first league game of the month was to journey to Merseyside to face Everton. Early into the second half, Spurs took the lead through Jermain Defoe and then quickly doubled their lead through a diving header from Michael Dawson. Everton began to fight back and clawed a goal back through Louis Saha, followed minutes later by the equalising goal from Tim Cahill to end the game at 2–2, with the two teams sharing the points following a last-minute penalty miss from Defoe. Six days later, Tottenham faced Wolverhampton Wanderers at White Hart Lane. In a tight game, the Wolves took all three points with a header from Kevin Doyle in the third minute with Tottenham unable to break down Wolves' defence.

Tottenham then competed against fellow top-four hopefuls Manchester City in a home fixture. Tottenham took the lead towards the end of an even first half with Niko Kranjčar volleying the ball home following a Peter Crouch knock-down. Spurs then doubled their lead nine minutes into the second half with Jermain Defoe bagging the second; a long kick out from goalkeeper Heurelho Gomes was met by Peter Crouch who headed the ball down for strike partner Defoe to steer the ball in the net. Spurs sealed the win in extra time with a sweeping move, following a through ball from Aaron Lennon; Kranjčar squeezed through the City defence before poking the ball through Shay Given's legs to earn a 3–0 win.

Three days later, Spurs made the trip to Ewood Park to face Blackburn Rovers. Tottenham took the lead moments before half-time, Peter Crouch earning the lead with a headed goal. Spurs then grounded out the win after Crouch scored his second following a through-ball from Jermaine Jenas to win the game 2–0. For the Boxing Day fixture, Spurs travelled across London to face Fulham. The two teams played out a 0–0 draw to share the points on the day.

Tottenham ended the month, year and decade with a home fixture against London rivals West Ham in which Spurs won 2–0. Tottenham took the lead early with the returning Luka Modrić scrambling the ball home in the 11th minute before Jermain Defoe closed the game with a well-struck volley late in the match to put Spurs in the UEFA Champions League places of the Premier League table as they entered 2010.

===== December league table =====
Pos	Team	Pld	W	D	L	GF	GA	GD	Pts	Qualification or relegation
1	Chelsea	20	14	3	3	45	16	+29	45	Group stage
2	Manchester United	20	14	1	5	45	18	+27	43	Group stage
3	Arsenal	19	13	2	4	51	21	+30	41	Group stage
4	Tottenham Hotspur	20	11	4	5	42	22	+20	37	Play-off round
5	Manchester City	19	9	8	2	38	27	+11	35	2010–11 UEFA Europa League Play-off round

Updated to match(es) played on 30 December 2009. Source: Barclays Premier League
Rules for classification: 1) points; 2) goal difference; 3) number of goals scored.

===== December game stats =====
Month	Games	Won	Drew	Lost	Scored	Conceded	Points	Other
December	7	3	2	2	9	5	11	Eliminated from League Cup

=== January transfer window ===
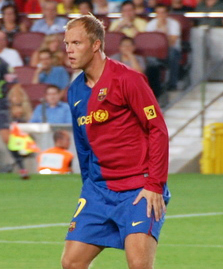
Experienced Icelandic international Eiður Guðjohnsen joined Tottenham on loan from Monaco for the rest of the season

In the 2008–09 transfer window, Tottenham experienced a relatively quiet transition throughout January. With the transfer window opening on the first day of the month, transfer speculation was mostly rebuffed by manager Harry Redknapp for the majority of the month; however, Tottenham managed to secure the arrival of two players in the window. On 28 January, experienced forward Eiður Guðjohnsen joined the club on loan from Monaco in a deal effective until the season's end. Two days later saw the return of another former player Younès Kaboul, re-signed from Portsmouth for a fee believed to be around £5 million in what was Tottenham's only permanent signing of the window.

The departures from Tottenham overshadowed the rest of the club's dealings both in terms of number and profile. The first sale involved the youngster Tomáš Pekhart, having just returned from a 12-month loan deal with Slavia Prague. Pekhart quickly joined Czech outfit Baumit Jablonec for an undisclosed fee. The only other outright leaving in January belonged to Troy Archibald-Henville, who after two successful loan spells with Exeter moved to Saint James' Park permanently, again for an undisclosed fee.

Loan exits dominated the departures, beginning early with the loan move of Jake Livermore to Peterborough United achieving completion on 8 January, six days later, youngster Andros Townsend joined Milton Keynes Dons on a season-long loan. The loans continued 13 days later, with Mexican international Giovani dos Santos re-uniting with his old manager Frank Rijkaard through a loan deal to Galatasaray until the end of the season, swiftly followed two days later, with Jamie O'Hara re-joining relegation battling Portsmouth until the season end after his initial loan ended in early January.

On the final day, Tottenham loaned out three players from the first-team squad. Initially, young talent Kyle Naughton returned to the Championship, joining Middlesbrough until the end of the season, followed later in the day, with Scottish international Alan Hutton moving to Sunderland in a loan move until the league end in May, The transfer window closed in England at 5 pm, however due to the Scottish transfer window remaining open until midnight, it paved the way for Robbie Keane to join Celtic in a loan deal until the end of the season, to the conclude Tottenham's 2009–10 January transfer window.

=== January ===
==== Month summary ====
Tottenham began the month with FA Cup duty, on 2 January, with a third-round tie against Peterborough United at White Hart Lane. Spurs strolled to a 4–0 win, courtesy of a brace from Niko Kranjčar, Jermain Defoe and a late Robbie Keane penalty. A fortnight later, Spurs played their first league game of 2010, facing Hull City at home. The match ended 0–0, with Hull goalkeeper Boaz Myhill earning plaudits for an inspiring performance.

On 20 January, Tottenham travelled to Anfield to face Liverpool. Spurs succumbed to a 2–0 defeat, with Dutch striker Dirk Kuyt scoring both goals, an early long-range effort and a late penalty. Three days later, Tottenham returned to the F.A. Cup to face Leeds United in the fourth round at White Hart Lane. Tottenham took the lead before half-time through a poached effort from Peter Crouch before Leeds equalised through Jermaine Beckford, who scrambled in a corner. Tottenham re-took the lead thanks to a Roman Pavlyuchenko finish, his first goal since August, and held the score line until the final moments. Michael Dawson was adjudged to have fouled Beckford in the penalty area and a penalty was duly awarded. Beckford converted the penalty six minutes into injury time to earn Leeds a replay.

Three days later, Spurs encountered Fulham in a home fixture. Tottenham scored early with Peter Crouch scoring a close-range finish before David Bentley settled the comfortable match with a free-kick goal with the help of a deflection. Tottenham concluded the month with a trip to Birmingham City. In an even game, Spurs took the lead deep into the second half through Jermain Defoe, before Liam Ridgewell scored a last-gasp header to equalise the game and end Tottenham's month with a draw.

===== January league table =====
Pos	Team	Pld	W	D	L	GF	GA	GD	Pts	Qualification or relegation
1	Chelsea	23	17	3	3	57	19	+38	54	Group stage
2	Manchester United	24	17	2	5	56	20	+36	53	Group stage
3	Arsenal	24	15	4	5	60	28	+32	49	Group stage
4	Tottenham Hotspur	24	12	6	6	45	25	+20	42	Play-off round
5	Liverpool	24	12	5	7	42	26	+16	41	2010–11 UEFA Europa League Play-off round

Updated to match(es) played on 31 January 2010. Source: Barclays Premier League
Rules for classification: 1) points; 2) goal difference; 3) number of goals scored.

===== January game stats =====
Month	Games	Won	Drew	Lost	Scored	Conceded	Points	Other
January	6	2	3	1	9	5	5	Advanced to F.A Cup fourth round

=== February ===
==== Month summary ====
The FA Cup opened February for Tottenham, facing Leeds United in a fourth-round replay following the 2–2 draw at White Hart Lane in late January. Spurs took the lead at Elland Road midway through the first half with Jermain Defoe striking the ball home before Luciano Becchio equalised from close range at the end of the first half. Tottenham re-took the lead deep into the second half with Defoe's second before closing out the match in injury time with Defoe claiming a hat-trick and earning Spurs a place in the fifth round. Three days later, on 6 February, Spurs competed in their first Premier League match of the month, facing fellow top four contenders, Aston Villa at home. The game ended 0–0 with both teams earning a point in their quest for Champions League football.

Tottenham then travelled to Molineux to play Wolverhampton Wanderers in a contest in which Wolves took all three points. A poor performance from Tottenham was punished by David Jones scoring the only goal of the game to secure the result for the relegation battlers.

Spurs returned to FA Cup action four days later with an away trip to Bolton Wanderers. Under new management with Owen Coyle at the helm, Bolton took the lead midway through the first half with Kevin Davies scoring a predatory strike. Spurs, however, forced a replay with Defoe slamming home the equaliser in the 61st minute to take the tie back to White Hart Lane.

Tottenham's away fixtures continued with a trip to Wigan, the team which succumbed to a 9–1 defeat in the reverse fixture earlier in the season, Tottenham began the game well with a goal from Jermain Defoe and cruised to a 3–0 win with two late goals from the returning Roman Pavlyuchenko. Three days later, Spurs played Bolton in the FA fifth round replay in which they sealed a path to the sixth round in a comfortable 4–0 win, two goals from Pavlyuchenko and two own goals, one from goalkeeper Jussi Jääskeläinen and defender Andy O'Brien. This sealed their place in the next round of the FA Cup.

Spurs ended the month at home against Everton. Spurs controlled the first half and took the lead early through Roman Pavlyuchenko, with his fifth goal in three games, and a stunning Luka Modrić effort following good build-up play through Croatian compatriots Niko Kranjčar and Vedran Ćorluka. Everton responded in the second half with a strike from Yakubu, but the game ended 2–1 and Spurs ended February in the fourth Champions League place.

===== February league table =====
Pos	Team	Pld	W	D	L	GF	GA	GD	Pts	Qualification or relegation
1	Chelsea	28	19	4	5	65	26	+39	61	Group stage
2	Manchester United	28	19	3	6	66	24	+42	60	Group stage
3	Arsenal	28	18	4	6	66	31	+35	58	Group stage
4	Tottenham Hotspur	28	14	7	7	50	27	+23	49	Play-off round
5	Manchester City	27	13	10	4	52	35	+17	49	2010–11 UEFA Europa League Play-off round

Updated to match(es) played on 28 February 2010. Source: Barclays Premier League
Rules for classification: 1) points; 2) goal difference; 3) number of goals scored.

===== February game stats =====
Month	Games	Won	Drew	Lost	Scored	Conceded	Points	Other
February	7	4	2	1	13	4	7	Advanced to F.A Cup sixth round

=== March ===
==== Month summary ====
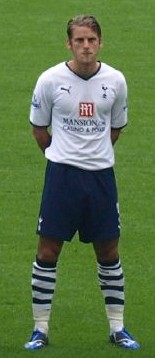
David Bentley's freekick turned the tide against Fulham and sent Spurs to the FA Cup semi-final

March began with Tottenham's trip to Craven Cottage to face Fulham in the FA Cup, where the tie ended 0–0, resulting in a replay having to be played later in the month.

Tottenham's first Premier League game of the month saw Blackburn visit White Hart Lane. The first half played out on level pegging until just before the half-time whistle, when Jermain Defoe struck to give Spurs the lead. Tottenham extended their lead early in the second half through Roman Pavlyuchenko before Christopher Samba gave Blackburn hope, bringing the score line back to 2–1. Spurs wrapped up the points late in the game with Pavlyuchenko scoring his second and Tottenham's third to earn the three points.

A week later, Tottenham travelled north to face Stoke at the Britannia Stadium. The game remained 0–0 through to half-time, however in the first minute of the second half, new loan signing Eiður Guðjohnsen powered his way to goal and scored his first goal for Spurs. Stoke clawed their way back into the game thanks to a Matthew Etherington penalty, given away after Benoît Assou-Ekotto was adjudged to have fouled Dave Kitson. Spurs secured the win, however, on the 77th-minute mark, with Niko Kranjčar smashing the ball home to leave Spurs fourth in the league.

Four days later, Spurs returned to FA Cup action with the home replay against Fulham. Midway through the first half, Fulham took the lead through a fine strike from ex-Tottenham player Bobby Zamora. Spurs rung the changes at half-time, making two substitutions and one immediately paid off, as the newly introduced David Bentley scored a free-kick to equalise the game. Tottenham took the lead ten minutes later through a Roman Pavlyuchenko volley and then put their name in the semi-final draw when Eiður Guðjohnsen squeezed home the third Spurs goal of the game.

Tottenham's last game of the month pitted Harry Redknapp, and numerous Spurs personnel, against their old club Portsmouth at White Hart Lane. Spurs took the lead early on through Peter Crouch before Niko Kranjčar compounded the game with a second goal and wrapped up the points for Tottenham.

===== March league table =====
Pos	Team	Pld	W	D	L	GF	GA	GD	Pts	Qualification or relegation
1	Manchester United	32	23	3	6	76	25	+51	72	Group stage
2	Chelsea	32	22	5	5	82	29	+53	71	Group stage
3	Arsenal	32	21	5	6	74	34	+40	68	Group stage
4	Tottenham Hotspur	31	17	7	7	57	29	+28	58	Play-off round
5	Manchester City	31	15	11	5	58	39	+19	56	2010–11 UEFA Europa League Play-off round

Updated to match(es) played on 29 March 2010. Source: Barclays Premier League
Rules for classification: 1) points; 2) goal difference; 3) number of goals scored.

===== March game stats =====
Month	Games	Won	Drew	Lost	Scored	Conceded	Points	Other
March	5	4	1	0	10	3	9	Advanced to F.A Cup Semi-Final

=== April ===
==== Month summary ====
The team went into April on the back of five straight league victories for the first time since April 2007. The run ended, however, in a 3–1 defeat at the Stadium of Light to Sunderland. Darren Bent scored against his former club within a minute, stabbing home from close range from an early corner to give Sunderland the lead. Bent went on to double the score line from the penalty spot before half-time. Spurs goalkeeper Heurelho Gomes kept the score at 2–0 with two penalty stops before substitute Peter Crouch gave Spurs a route back into the game with a header, though only for a stunning Boudewijn Zenden volley to seal the points for Sunderland.

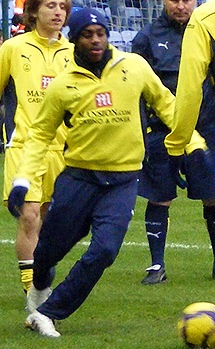
Danny Rose scored his first-ever goal for Tottenham with a thunderous volley against Arsenal

Following this was the FA Cup semi-final at Wembley Stadium. Tottenham entered the game as favourites against a recently relegated Portsmouth side. The game remained 0–0 for 90 minutes and so entered extra time. Early in the first half of the extra 30, a Michael Dawson slip from a Portsmouth free-kick allowed Frédéric Piquionne to finish from a few yards out to give Portsmouth the initiative. Peter Crouch had a goal wrongly ruled out in the second half of extra time before ex-Tottenham player Kevin-Prince Boateng sealed the final place for Portsmouth with a last-minute penalty.

Just three days later from the disappointment of losing the FA Cup semi-final, Tottenham contested the North London derby against rivals Arsenal. Spurs amazingly took the lead with league debutant Danny Rose scoring a wonder volley to give the home team a 1–0 lead. Spurs then doubled their lead a few minutes into the second half, with Gareth Bale tapping home from a Jermain Defoe through-ball. The introduction of the returning Robin van Persie led Gomes to make three miraculous saves to ensure Tottenham's lead before Nicklas Bendtner gave Arsenal a late consolation marker. The game finished 2–1 to give Spurs their first league win over Arsenal in 11 years.

The third game of the week came at White Hart Lane to league-leaders Chelsea. Spurs took the lead early in the first half from a Jermain Defoe penalty after John Terry handballed a Roman Pavlyuchenko flick-on. Gareth Bale scored his second goal of the week and doubled Tottenham's lead before half-time with a right-footed effort. Terry saw red in the second half for two bookable offences of Pavlyuchenko and Bale respectively before Frank Lampard got a late consolation in injury time, but Spurs held on for another invaluable three points.

Tottenham faced their third consecutive top-four team when Spurs travelled to Old Trafford to face Manchester United the following weekend. After a goalless first half, United took the lead from the penalty spot in the first half after Benoît Assou-Ekotto brought down Patrice Evra in the area, with Ryan Giggs converting. Ledley King equalised with a header during the second half, before Nani's chip and another Giggs penalty gave the points to United.

===== April league table =====
Pos	Team	Pld	W	D	L	GF	GA	GD	Pts	Qualification or relegation
1	Chelsea	36	25	5	6	93	32	+61	80	Group stage
2	Manchester United	36	25	4	7	81	28	+53	79	Group stage
3	Arsenal	36	22	6	8	78	39	+39	72	Group stage
4	Tottenham Hotspur	35	19	7	9	63	37	+26	64	Play-off round
5	Aston Villa	36	17	13	6	51	35	+16	64	2010–11 UEFA Europa League Play-off round

Updated to match(es) played on 29 April 2010. Source: Barclays Premier League
Rules for classification: 1) points; 2) goal difference; 3) number of goals scored.

===== April game stats =====
Month	Games	Won	Drew	Lost	Scored	Conceded	Points	Other
April	5	2	0	3	6	10	6	Eliminated from FA Cup

=== May ===
==== Month summary ====
Tottenham began the final month of the season on the first day of the month with a home tie against Bolton, looking to keep the initiative in the race for fourth place. In a tense game, Tottenham won the game 1–0 thanks to a long-range effort from Tom Huddlestone late in the first half to keep Spurs in the Champions League places and fate in their own hands.

Four days later, Tottenham travelled to Manchester to face the only remaining rival for the last Champions League spot, Manchester City, in a game which could have possibly decided the fate of the final place. Spurs and City battled out the first half with both teams creating chances to take the lead before Spurs gained a foothold in the second half. The game looked to be heading for a draw until in the 82nd minute, Peter Crouch scored a close-range header to give Tottenham the win and ensure the club Champions League football for the first time.

Spurs ended the 2009–10 Premier League with an away trip to relegated Burnley. Tottenham took an early lead with Gareth Bale powering home in the third minute, then doubled the advantage after a Luka Modrić solo effort. Burnley clawed a goal back moments before half-time through Wade Elliott prodding the ball in through good play. Lingering thoughts of achieving third place above rivals Arsenal were extinguished after the Gunners won comfortably against Fulham in their final game. Early in the second half, Burnley equalised through Jack Cork and then took the lead minutes later through a Martin Paterson tap-in. Burnley sealed the points with a late Elliott goal to give Burnley a 4–2 win over Tottenham who, despite the final result, finished fourth, their highest-ever Premier League finish.

===== May league table =====
Pos	Team	Pld	W	D	L	GF	GA	GD	Pts	Qualification or relegation
1	Chelsea (C)	38	27	5	6	103	32	+71	86	Group stage
2	Manchester United	38	27	4	7	86	28	+58	85	Group stage
3	Arsenal	38	23	6	9	83	41	+42	75	Group stage
4	Tottenham Hotspur	38	21	7	10	67	41	+26	70	Play-off round
5	Manchester City	38	18	13	7	73	45	+28	67	2010–11 UEFA Europa League Play-off round

Source: Barclays Premier League
Rules for classification: 1) points; 2) goal difference; 3) number of goals scored.
(C) Champions

===== May game stats =====
Month	Games	Won	Drew	Lost	Scored	Conceded	Points	Other
May	3	2	0	1	4	4	6	Finished in 4th Premier League place

== Premier League table ==
Pos	Team	Pld	W	D	L	GF	GA	GD	Pts	Qualification or relegation
2	Manchester United	38	27	4	7	86	28	+58	85	Qualification for the Champions League group stage
3	Arsenal	38	23	6	9	83	41	+42	75	Qualification for the Champions League group stage
4	Tottenham Hotspur	38	21	7	10	67	41	+26	70	Qualification for the Champions League play-off round
5	Manchester City	38	18	13	7	73	45	+28	67	Qualification for the Europa League play-off round (Note: Since Manchester United won the League Cup and then qualified for the Champions League, their spot in the Europa League was passed down to the 6th-placed team. The 6th-placed Aston Villa was coincidentally also the League Cup runners-up.)
6	Aston Villa	38	17	13	8	52	39	+13	64	Qualification for the Europa League play-off round

Source: Barclays Premier League

== Transfers ==
=== In ===
Datef	Player	Previous club	Cost
9 July 2009	(England) Anton Blackwood	Arsenal	Free
22 July 2009	(England) Kyle Naughton	Sheffield United	Undisclosed
22 July 2009	(England) Kyle Walker	Sheffield United	Undisclosed
27 July 2009	(England) Peter Crouch	Portsmouth	£10 million
6 August 2009	(Cameroon) Sébastien Bassong	Newcastle	£8 million
1 September 2009	(Croatia) Niko Kranjčar	Portsmouth	£2.5 million
3 September 2009	(England) Jimmy Walker	West Ham United	Free
30 January 2010	(France) Younès Kaboul	Portsmouth	£8 million
			Total
			£28.5 million +

=== Out ===
Date	Player	New club	Cost
1 June 2009	(England) Simon Dawkins	Unattached	Released
1 June 2009	(England) Takura Mtandari	Unattached	Released
1 June 2009	(England) Kyle Fraser-Allen	Hayes & Yeading United	Free
1 June 2009	(Portugal) Ricardo Rocha	Standard Liège	Free
1 June 2009	(Republic of Ireland) David Hutton	Cheltenham Town	Free
12 June 2009	(England) Danny Hutchins	Yeovil Town	Free
25 June 2009	(Republic of Ireland) Cian Hughton	Lincoln City	Free
8 July 2009	(Ivory Coast) Didier Zokora	Sevilla	£7.5 million
16 July 2009	(Democratic Republic of the Congo) Jacques Maghoma	Burton Albion	Free
17 July 2009	(Wales) Chris Gunter	Nottingham Forest	£1.75 million
20 July 2009	(Spain) Yuri Berchiche	Real Valladolid	Free
24 July 2009	(Brazil) Gilberto	Cruzeiro	Free
5 August 2009	(England) Darren Bent	Sunderland	£10 million
27 August 2009	(France) Pascal Chimbonda	Blackburn Rovers	£2 million
28 August 2009	(Ghana) Kevin-Prince Boateng	Portsmouth	£4 million
12 January 2010	(Czech Republic) Tomáš Pekhart	Jablonec	Undisclosed
1 February 2010	(England) Troy Archibald-Henville	Exeter City	Undisclosed
			Total
			£31.75 million +

=== Completed loan arrivals ===
Date	Player	Club	Return Date
28 January 2010	(Iceland) Eiður Guðjohnsen	Monaco	9 May 2010

=== Completed loan departures ===
Date	Player	Club	Return date
22 July 2009	(England) David Button	Crewe Alexandra	20 August 2009
24 July 2009	(England) Ben Alnwick	Norwich City	5 September 2009
6 August 2009	(England) Adam Smith	Wycombe Wanderers	5 September 2009
1 September 2009	(England) Sam Cox	Cheltenham Town	12 October 2009
1 September 2009	(England) Lee Butcher	Grays Athletic	13 October 2009
17 September 2009	(England) Dean Parrett	Aldershot Town	23 October 2009
1 September 2009	(England) David Button	Crewe Alexandra	27 October 2009
29 September 2009	(England) Danny Rose	Peterborough United	11 November 2009
14 October 2009	(England) Lee Butcher	Leyton Orient	17 November 2009
1 September 2009	(Sweden) Oscar Jansson	Exeter City	3 December 2009
13 November 2009	(England) Sam Cox	Histon	13 December 2009
6 August 2009	(England) Andros Townsend	Leyton Orient	1 January 2010
26 November 2009	(England) Calum Butcher	Barnet	4 January 2010
10 August 2009	(England) Jake Livermore	Derby County	8 January 2010
28 August 2009	(England) Jamie O'Hara	Portsmouth	17 January 2010
13 November 2009	(England) John Bostock	Brentford	23 January 2010
24 July 2009	(England) Troy Archibald-Henville	Exeter City	24 January 2010
22 July 2009	(England) Kyle Walker	Sheffield United	1 February 2010
11 August 2009	(England) Jonathan Obika	Yeovil Town	11 February 2010
22 January 2010	(England) Sam Cox	Torquay United	11 February 2010
8 January 2010	(England) Jake Livermore	Peterborough United	2 March 2010
14 January 2010	(England) Andros Townsend	Milton Keynes Dons	4 March 2010
13 July 2009	(England) Ryan Mason	Yeovil Town	15 March 2010
20 November 2009	(England) David Button	Shrewsbury	5 May 2010
13 July 2009	(England) Steven Caulker	Yeovil Town	9 May 2010
22 July 2009	(Morocco) Adel Taarabt	Queens Park Rangers	9 May 2010
9 November 2009	(Italy) Mirko Ranieri	Ipswich Town	9 May 2010
20 November 2009	(England) Adam Smith	Torquay	9 May 2010
1 February 2010	(England) Kyle Naughton	Middlesbrough	9 May 2010
1 February 2010	(Scotland) Alan Hutton	Sunderland	9 May 2010
1 February 2010	(Republic of Ireland) Robbie Keane	Celtic	9 May 2010
29 January 2010	(England) Jamie O'Hara	Portsmouth	17 May 2010
27 January 2010	(Mexico) Giovani dos Santos	Galatasaray	20 May 2010
11 February 2010	(England) Jonathan Obika	Millwall	29 May 2010

== Squad list ==
Note: Flags indicate national team as defined under FIFA eligibility rules; some limited exceptions apply. Players may hold more than one non-FIFA nationality.

No.	Pos.	Nation	Player
1	GK	BRA	Heurelho Gomes
3	DF	WAL	Gareth Bale
4	DF	FRA	Younes Kaboul
5	MF	ENG	David Bentley
6	MF	ENG	Tom Huddlestone
7	MF	ENG	Aaron Lennon
8	MF	ENG	Jermaine Jenas
9	FW	RUS	Roman Pavlyuchenko
12	MF	HON	Wilson Palacios
13	GK	ENG	Jimmy Walker
14	MF	CRO	Luka Modrić
15	FW	ENG	Peter Crouch
18	FW	ENG	Jermain Defoe

No.	Pos.	Nation	Player
17	FW	ISL	Eiður Guðjohnsen (on loan from Monaco)
19	DF	CMR	Sébastien Bassong
20	DF	ENG	Michael Dawson (captain)
21	MF	CRO	Niko Kranjčar
22	DF	CRO	Vedran Ćorluka
23	GK	ITA	Carlo Cudicini
25	MF	ENG	Danny Rose
26	DF	ENG	Ledley King (club captain)
27	GK	ENG	Ben Alnwick
28	DF	ENG	Kyle Walker
30	DF	FRA	Dorian Dervite
32	DF	CMR	Benoît Assou-Ekotto
39	DF	ENG	Jonathan Woodgate

== Long-term injury list ==
Date Injured	Player	Injury	Return Date
3 June 2009	(Wales) Gareth Bale	Knee meniscus tear	17 September 2009
23 June 2009	(England) Michael Dawson	Achilles Injury	22 September 2009
23 June 2009	(England) Jonathan Woodgate	Groin Injury	24 October 2009
19 August 2009	(Brazil) Heurelho Gomes	Groin Strain	17 September 2009
23 September 2009	(Mexico) Giovani dos Santos	Ankle Injury	6 December 2009
29 August 2009	(Croatia) Luka Modrić	Fibula Fracture	12 December 2009
12 November 2009	(Italy) Carlo Cudicini	Broken Pelvis & Wrist Fractures	End of 2009–10 season
25 November 2009	(England) Jonathan Woodgate	Groin Injury	End of 2009–10 season
28 December 2009	(England) Aaron Lennon	Groin Injury	1 May 2010
11 April 2010	(Croatia) Niko Kranjčar	Ankle Injury	End of 2009–10 season
11 April 2010	(Croatia) Vedran Ćorluka	Ankle Injury	End of 2009–10 season

== Match results ==
=== Pre-season ===
Date	Opponents	H / A	Result	Scorers	Attendance
15 July 2009	Exeter City	A	0–3	O'Hara 31', Lennon 68', Bent 80'	8,636
17 July 2009	AFC Bournemouth	A	0–3	Keane 27', Defoe 55', Palacios 67'	9,074
21 July 2009	Peterborough United	A	0–4	Bent 36', Defoe 65', Modrić 68', Pavlyuchenko 74'	7,688
24 July 2009	Barcelona	N	1–1	Livermore 82'	57,932
26 July 2009	Celtic	N	0–2		64,562
29 July 2009	West Ham United	N	0–1	Defoe 74'	10,005
31 July 2009	Hull City	N	0–3	Keane 16', 69' (pen), Lennon 88'	10,056
2 August 2009	South China	A	0–2
9 August 2009	Olympiacos	H	3–0	Pavlyuchenko 66', Ćorluka 68', Defoe 77'	26,462

=== Premier League ===
16 August 2009 1	Tottenham Hotspur	2–1	Liverpool	Tottenham, London
16:00	Assou-Ekotto 44'; Bassong 59'	Report	Gerrard 56' (pen.)	Stadium: White Hart Lane; Attendance: 35,935; Referee: Phil Dowd

19 August 2009 2	Hull City	1–5	Tottenham Hotspur	Kingston upon Hull
19:45	Hunt 25'	Report	Defoe 10', 45', 90+4'; Palacios 14'; Keane 78'	Stadium: KCOM Stadium; Attendance: 24,735; Referee: Chris Foy

23 August 2009 3	West Ham United	1–2	Tottenham Hotspur	London
13:30	Cole 49'	Report	Defoe 54'; Lennon 79'	Stadium: Boleyn Ground; Attendance: 33,095; Referee: Mark Clattenburg

29 August 2009 4	Tottenham Hotspur	2–1	Birmingham City	Tottenham, London
15:00	Crouch 72'; Lennon 90+5'	Report	Bowyer 75'	Stadium: White Hart Lane; Attendance: 35,318; Referee: Peter Walton

12 September 2009 5	Tottenham Hotspur	1–3	Manchester United	Tottenham, London
17:30	Defoe 1'	Report	Giggs 25'; Anderson 41'; Rooney 78'	Stadium: White Hart Lane; Attendance: 35,785; Referee: Andre Marriner

20 September 2009 6	Chelsea	3–0	Tottenham Hotspur	London
16:00	Cole 32'; Ballack 58'; Drogba 63'	Report		Stadium: Stamford Bridge; Attendance: 41,623; Referee: Howard Webb

26 September 2009 7	Tottenham Hotspur	5–0	Burnley	Tottenham, London
15:00	Keane 18' (pen.), 74', 77', 87'; Jenas 33'	Report		Stadium: White Hart Lane; Attendance: 35,462; Referee: Mike Dean

3 October 2009 8	Bolton Wanderers	2–2	Tottenham Hotspur	Bolton
15:00	Gardner 4'; K. Davies 69'	Report	Kranjčar 34'; Corluka 73'	Stadium: Reebok Stadium; Attendance: 21,305; Referee: Mike Jones

17 October 2009 9	Portsmouth	1–2	Tottenham Hotspur	Portsmouth
15:00	Boateng 59'	Report	King 29'; Defoe 45'	Stadium: Fratton Park; Attendance: 20,821; Referee: Phil Dowd

24 October 2009 10	Tottenham Hotspur	0–1	Stoke City	Tottenham, London
15:00		Report	Whelan 86'	Stadium: White Hart Lane; Attendance: 36,031; Referee: Lee Probert

31 October 2009 11	Arsenal	3–0	Tottenham Hotspur	London
12:45	van Persie 42', 60'; Fàbregas 43'	Report		Stadium: Emirates Stadium; Attendance: 60,103; Referee: Mark Clattenburg

7 November 2009 12	Tottenham Hotspur	2–0	Sunderland	Tottenham, London
15:00	Keane 12'; Huddlestone 68'	Report		Stadium: White Hart Lane; Attendance: 35,955; Referee: Kevin Friend

22 November 2009 13	Tottenham Hotspur	9–1	Wigan Athletic	Tottenham, London
15:00	Crouch 9'; Defoe 51', 54', 58', 69', 87'; Lennon 60'; Bentley 88'; Niko Kranjčar 90+4'	Report	Scharner 57'	Stadium: White Hart Lane; Attendance: 35,650; Referee: Peter Walton

28 November 2009 14	Aston Villa	1–1	Tottenham Hotspur	Birmingham
17:30	Agbonlahor 10'	Report	Dawson 77'	Stadium: Villa Park; Attendance: 39,866; Referee: Phil Dowd

6 December 2009 15	Everton	2–2	Tottenham Hotspur	Liverpool
16:00	Saha 78'; Cahill 86'	Report	Defoe 47'; Dawson 59'	Stadium: Goodison Park; Attendance: 34,003; Referee: Andre Marriner

12 December 2009 16	Tottenham Hotspur	0–1	Wolverhampton Wanderers	Tottenham, London
15:00		Report	Doyle 3'	Stadium: White Hart Lane; Attendance: 36,012; Referee: Stuart Attwell

16 December 2009 17	Tottenham Hotspur	3–0	Manchester City	Tottenham, London
20:00	Kranjčar 37', 90+3'; Defoe 54'	Report		Stadium: White Hart Lane; Attendance: 35,891; Referee: Alan Wiley

19 December 2009 18	Blackburn Rovers	0–2	Tottenham Hotspur	Blackburn
15:00		Report	Crouch 45+2', 83'	Stadium: Ewood Park; Attendance: 26,490; Referee: Peter Walton

26 December 2009 19	Fulham	0–0	Tottenham Hotspur	Fulham, London
13:00		Report		Stadium: Craven Cottage; Attendance: 25,679; Referee: Steve Bennett

28 December 2009 20	Tottenham Hotspur	2–0	West Ham United	Tottenham, London
12:45	Modrić 11'; Defoe 81'	Report		Stadium: White Hart Lane; Attendance: 35,994; Referee: Chris Foy

16 January 2010 21	Tottenham Hotspur	0–0	Hull City	Tottenham, London
15:00		Report		Stadium: White Hart Lane; Attendance: 35,729; Referee: Martin Atkinson

20 January 2010 22	Liverpool	2–0	Tottenham Hotspur	Liverpool
20:00	Kuyt 6', 90+3' (pen.)	Report		Stadium: Anfield; Attendance: 42,016; Referee: Howard Webb

26 January 2010 23	Tottenham Hotspur	2–0	Fulham	Tottenham, London
20:00	Crouch 27'; Bentley 60'	Report		Stadium: White Hart Lane; Attendance: 35,467; Referee: Mike Dean

30 January 2010 24	Birmingham City	1–1	Tottenham Hotspur	Birmingham
15:00	Ridgewell 90+1'	Report	Defoe 69'	Stadium: St Andrew's; Attendance: 27,238; Referee: Stuart Attwell

6 February 2010 25	Tottenham Hotspur	0–0	Aston Villa	Tottenham, London
17:30		Report		Stadium: White Hart Lane; Attendance: 35,899; Referee: Chris Foy

10 February 2010 26	Wolverhampton Wanderers	1–0	Tottenham Hotspur	Wolverhampton
19:45	Jones 27'	Report		Stadium: Molineux Stadium; Attendance: 27,992; Referee: Mark Clattenburg

21 February 2010 27	Wigan Athletic	0–3	Tottenham Hotspur	Wigan
16:15		Report	Defoe 27'; Pavlyuchenko 84', 90+3'	Stadium: DW Stadium; Attendance: 16,165; Referee: Alan Wiley

28 February 2010 28	Tottenham Hotspur	2–1	Everton	Tottenham, London
13:00	Pavlyuchenko 11'; Modrić 28'	Report	Yakubu 55'	Stadium: White Hart Lane; Attendance: 35,912; Referee: Steve Bennett

13 March 2010 29	Tottenham Hotspur	3–1	Blackburn Rovers	Tottenham, London
12:45	Defoe 45+1'; Pavlyuchenko 55', 85'	Report	Samba 80'	Stadium: White Hart Lane; Attendance: 35,474; Referee: Howard Webb

20 March 2010 30	Stoke City	1–2	Tottenham Hotspur	Stoke-on-Trent
15:00	Etherington 64' (pen.)	Report	Guðjohnsen 46'; Kranjčar 77'	Stadium: Britannia Stadium; Attendance: 27,575; Referee: Mike Dean

27 March 2010 31	Tottenham Hotspur	2–0	Portsmouth	Tottenham, London
15:00	Crouch 27'; Kranjčar 41'	Report		Stadium: White Hart Lane; Attendance: 35,870; Referee: Kevin Friend

3 April 2010 32	Sunderland	3–1	Tottenham Hotspur	Sunderland
15:00	Bent 1', 29' (pen.); Zenden 86'	Report	Crouch 72'	Stadium: Stadium of Light; Attendance: 43,184; Referee: Lee Mason

14 April 2010 33	Tottenham Hotspur	2–1	Arsenal	Tottenham, London
20:00	Rose 10'; Bale 47'	Report	Bendtner 85'	Stadium: White Hart Lane; Attendance: 36,041; Referee: Mark Clattenburg

17 April 2010 34	Tottenham Hotspur	2–1	Chelsea	Tottenham, London
17:30	Defoe 15' (pen.); Bale 44'	Report	Lampard 90+2'	Stadium: White Hart Lane; Attendance: 35,814; Referee: Phil Dowd

24 April 2010 35	Manchester United	3–1	Tottenham Hotspur	Manchester
12:45	Giggs 58' (pen.), 86' (pen.); Nani 81'	Report	King 70'	Stadium: Old Trafford; Attendance: 75,268; Referee: Andre Marriner

1 May 2010 36	Tottenham Hotspur	1–0	Bolton Wanderers	Tottenham, London
15:00	Huddlestone 38'	Report		Stadium: White Hart Lane; Attendance: 35,852; Referee: Chris Foy

5 May 2010 37	Manchester City	0–1	Tottenham Hotspur	Manchester
20:00		Report	Crouch 82'	Stadium: Etihad Stadium; Attendance: 47,370; Referee: Steve Bennett

9 May 2010 38	Burnley	4–2	Tottenham Hotspur	Burnley
16:00	Elliot 42'; Cork 54'; Paterson 71'; Thompson 88'	Report	Bale 3'; Modrić 32'	Stadium: Turf Moor; Attendance: 21,161; Referee: Mike Dean

=== FA Cup ===
Round	Date	Opponents	H / A	Result	Scorers	Attendance
Third round	2 January 2010	Peterborough United	H	4–0	Kranjčar 35', 57', Defoe 70', Keane 90+5' (pen)	35,862
Fourth round	23 January 2010	Leeds United	H	2–2	Crouch 42', Pavlyuchenko 75'	35,750
Fourth round replay	3 February 2010	Leeds United	A	1–3	Defoe 37', 73', 90'	37,704
Fifth round	14 February 2010	Bolton Wanderers	A	1–1	Defoe 61'	13,596
Fifth round replay	24 February 2010	Bolton Wanderers	H	4–0	Pavlyuchenko 23', 87', Jääskeläinen 35' (o.g.), O'Brien 47' (o.g.)	31,436
Sixth round	6 March 2010	Fulham	A	0–0		24,533
Sixth round replay	24 March 2010	Fulham	H	3–1	Bentley 47', Pavlyuchenko 60', Guðjohnsen 66'	35,432
Semi-final	11 April 2010	Portsmouth	N	0–2		84,602

=== League Cup ===
26 August 2009 2nd Round	Doncaster Rovers	1–5	Tottenham Hotspur	Doncaster
19:45	Woods 61' (pen.)	Report	Huddlestone 9'; O'Hara 11'; Crouch 37'; Bentley 52'; Pavlyuchenko 69'	Stadium: Eco-Power Stadium; Attendance: 12,923; Referee: Russell Booth

23 September 2009 3rd Round	Preston North End	1–5	Tottenham Hotspur	Preston
19:45	Brown 83'	Report	Crouch 14', 77', 90'; Defoe 37'; Keane 87'	Stadium: Deepdale; Attendance: 16,533; Referee: Phil Dowd

27 October 2009 4th Round	Tottenham Hotspur	2–0	Everton	Tottenham, London
20:00	Huddlestone 31'; Keane 57'	Report		Stadium: White Hart Lane; Attendance: 35.843; Referee: Lee Mason

1 December 2009 5th Round	Manchester United	2–0	Tottenham Hotspur	Manchester
20:00	Gibson 16', 38'	Report		Stadium: Old Trafford; Attendance: 57,212; Referee: Mark Clattenburg

== Statistics ==
=== Appearances ===
Last updated: 26 July 2020.
Source: premierleague.com

No.	Pos.	Name	Premier League		FA Cup		League Cup		Total	
No.	Pos.	Name	Apps	Goals	Apps	Goals	Apps	Goals	Apps	Goals
Goalkeepers
1	GK	(Brazil) Heurelho Gomes	31	0	8	0	3	0	42	0
23	GK	(Italy) Carlo Cudicini	6+1	0	0	0	1	0	7+1	0
27	GK	(England) Ben Alnwick	1	0	0	0	0	0	1	0
35	GK	(England) David Button	0	0	0	0	0+1	0	0+1	0
Defenders
2	DF	(Scotland) Alan Hutton	1+7	0	2	0	4	0	7+7	0
4	DF	(France) Younes Kaboul	8+2	0	0	0	0	0	8+2	0
16	DF	(England) Kyle Naughton	0+1	0	0+1	0	1	0	1+2	0
19	DF	(Cameroon) Sébastien Bassong	25+3	1	7	0	3	0	35+3	1
20	DF	(England) Michael Dawson	25+4	2	8	0	3	0	36+4	2
22	DF	(Croatia) Vedran Corluka	29	1	5	0	1+1	0	35+1	1
25	DF	(England) Danny Rose	1	1	1+2	0	0+1	0	2+3	1
26	DF	(England) Ledley King	19+1	2	1	0	0	0	20+1	2
28	DF	(England) Kyle Walker	2	0	0	0	0	0	2	0
32	DF	(Cameroon) Benoît Assou-Ekotto	29+1	1	3	0	1	0	33+1	1
39	DF	(England) Jonathan Woodgate	3	0	0	0	0	0	3	0
Midfielders
3	MF	(Wales) Gareth Bale	18+5	3	8	0	3	0	29+5	3
5	MF	(England) David Bentley	11+4	2	4+1	1	4	1	19+5	4
6	MF	(England) Tom Huddlestone	33	2	5+1	0	3+1	2	41+2	4
7	MF	(England) Aaron Lennon	20+2	3	0	0	1+1	0	21+3	3
8	MF	(England) Jermaine Jenas	9+10	1	2	0	2	0	13+10	1
12	MF	(Honduras) Wilson Palacios	29+4	1	6+1	0	3	0	38+5	1
14	MF	(Croatia) Luka Modrić	21+4	3	7	0	0	0	28+4	3
21	MF	(Croatia) Niko Kranjčar	19+5	6	5+3	2	0	0	24+8	8
24	MF	(England) Jamie O'Hara	0+2	0	0	0	1	1	1+2	1
29	MF	(England) Jake Livermore	0+1	0	0	0	0	0	0+1	0
Forwards
9	FW	(Russia) Roman Pavlyuchenko	8+8	5	2+4	4	2	1	12+12	10
10	FW	(Republic of Ireland) Robbie Keane	15+5	6	1+1	1	2+1	2	18+7	9
15	FW	(England) Peter Crouch	21+17	8	6	1	2+1	4	29+18	13
17	FW	(Mexico) Giovani dos Santos	0+1	0	0	0	2	0	2+1	0
17	FW	(Iceland) Eiður Guðjohnsen	3+8	1	1+2	1	0	0	4+10	2
18	FW	(England) Jermain Defoe	31+3	18	6+1	5	2	1	39+4	24
Players transferred out during the season
28	MF	(Ghana) Kevin-Prince Boateng	0	0	0	0	0+1	0	0+1	0

=== Goal scorers ===
Last updated: 26 July 2020.
Source: premierleague.com

The list is sorted by shirt number when total goals are equal.

Rnk	Pos	No.	Player	Premier League	FA Cup	League Cup	Total
1	FW	18	(England) Jermain Defoe	18	5	1	24
2	FW	15	(England) Peter Crouch	8	1	4	13
3	FW	9	(Russia) Roman Pavlyuchenko	5	4	1	10
4	FW	10	(Republic of Ireland) Robbie Keane	6	1	2	9
5	MF	21	(Croatia) Niko Kranjcar	6	2	0	8
6	MF	5	(England) David Bentley	2	1	1	4
6	MF	6	(England) Tom Huddlestone	2	0	2	4
8	MF	3	(Wales) Gareth Bale	3	0	0	3
8	MF	7	(England) Aaron Lennon	3	0	0	3
8	MF	14	(Croatia) Luka Modrić	3	0	0	3
11	FW	17	(Iceland) Eiður Guðjohnsen	1	1	0	2
11	DF	20	(England) Michael Dawson	2	0	0	2
11	DF	26	(England) Ledley King	2	0	0	2
14	MF	8	(England) Jermaine Jenas	1	0	0	1
14	MF	12	(Honduras) Wilson Palacios	1	0	0	1
14	DF	19	(Cameroon) Sebastien Bassong	1	0	0	1
14	DF	22	(Croatia) Vedran Corluka	1	0	0	1
14	MF	24	(England) Jamie O'Hara	0	0	1	1
14	DF	25	(England) Danny Rose	1	0	0	1
14	DF	32	(Cameroon) Benoît Assou-Ekotto	1	0	0	1
TOTALS				67	15	12	94

=== Clean sheets ===
Last updated: 26 July 2020.
Source: premierleague.com

The list is sorted by shirt number when total clean sheets are equal.

Rnk	No.	Player	Premier League	FA Cup	League Cup	Total
1	1	(Brazil) Heurelho Gomes	13	3	1	17
2	23	(Italy) Carlo Cudicini	1	0	0	1
2	35	(England) David Button	0	0	1	1
TOTALS			14	3	2	19

== Premier League results by matchday ==
Match	1	2	3	4	5	6	7	8	9	10	11	12	13	14	15	16	17	18	19	20	21	22	23	24	25	26	27	28	29	30	31	32	33	34	35	36	37	38
Ground	H	A	A	H	H	A	H	A	A	H	A	H	H	A	A	H	H	A	A	H	H	A	H	A	H	A	A	H	H	A	H	A	H	H	A	H	A	A
Result	W	W	W	W	L	L	W	D	W	L	L	W	W	D	D	L	W	W	D	W	D	L	W	D	D	L	W	W	W	W	W	L	W	W	L	W	W	L
Position	7	1	1	2	4	6	4	3	3	4	5	4	4	3	4	5	5	5	5	4	4	4	4	4	5	6	4	4	4	4	4	5	5	4	4	4	4	4

A = Away; H = Home; W = Win; D = Draw; L = Loss
