= Nicky Wroe =

English association football player

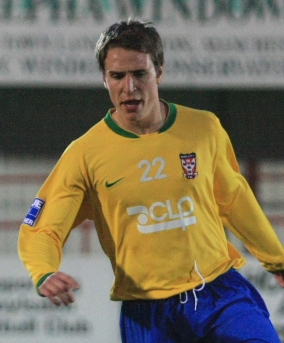
- Wroe playing for York City in 2008

Personal information
- Full name: Nicholas Wroe
- Date of birth: 28 September 1985 (age 41)
- Place of birth: Sheffield, England
- Height: 5 ft 11 in (1.80 m)
- Position: Midfielder

Youth career
- –2003: Barnsley

Senior career*
Years	Team	Apps	(Gls)
2003–2007	Barnsley	49	(1)
2007	→ Bury (loan)	5	(0)
2007	Hamilton Academical	0	(0)
2007–2008	York City	29	(6)
2008–2011	Torquay United	105	(18)
2011–2012	Shrewsbury Town	56	(7)
2012–2014	Preston North End	43	(8)
2013–2014	→ Shrewsbury Town (loan)	10	(0)
2014	→ Oxford United (loan)	18	(2)
2014–2016	Notts County	12	(0)
2015–2016	→ FC Halifax Town (loan)	12	(2)
2016	FC Halifax Town	18	(3)
2016–2019	Bradford Park Avenue	110	(8)
2019	Boston United	16	(1)
2019–2020	Curzon Ashton	10	(0)

International career
2009	England C	2	(0)
- * Club domestic league appearances and goals as of 18:47, 8 May 2019 (UTC)

Nicholas "Nicky" Wroe (born 28 September 1985) is an English professional footballer who plays as a midfielder, most recently for Curzon Ashton.

== Club career ==
=== Barnsley ===
Born in Sheffield, South Yorkshire, Wroe came through the youth system of Barnsley and during a match for their academy he was sent off for violent conduct, which resulted in him receiving a three-match ban. He made his first team debut on 3 May 2003 against Wigan Athletic in the Second Division. He signed a new contract with Barnsley in December 2004, which would expire in the summer of 2007. He joined Bury on a one-month loan on 9 February 2007, making his debut in a 4–0 defeat against Wycombe Wanderers in League Two on 17 February. The loan was extended for a second month in March and he finished the spell with five appearances.

=== Hamilton Academical and York City ===
He signed for Scottish First Division side Hamilton Academical on a one-match contract in August 2007. He made his debut in a 2–1 defeat against Ayr United in the Scottish Challenge Cup, but was released by Hamilton after the game. He signed for York City in the Conference Premier towards the end of the transfer window after playing a match for the reserve side, during which he picked up a knock and so was unable to make his debut against Rushden & Diamonds. He eventually made his debut in a 2–0 defeat to Stevenage Borough on 15 September 2007. He was rested for York's Conference League Cup match against Northwich Victoria in February 2008. He missed the remainder of the 2007–08 season due to a knee problem, with his last game being a 4–0 victory against Stafford Rangers on 8 April 2008. He finished the season with 40 appearances and 10 goals. York manager Colin Walker exercised his option for Wroe's contract to be extended for the 2008–09 season in April 2008, but was transfer listed in May after claiming he did not want to play for the club.

=== Torquay United ===
Wroe moved to Conference Premier rivals Torquay United for an undisclosed fee on 28 May 2008. He made his debut in a 1–1 draw with Histon on the opening day of the season, and after starting in two further games he was dropped for the game against Crawley Town to make way for another player. However, he fought his way back into the side.

=== Shrewsbury Town ===
Wroe joined League Two rivals Shrewsbury Town for an undisclosed fee on 31 January 2011 in a trade deal, with Jake Robinson joining Torquay. He made 44 appearances and scored six goals in the 2011–12 season, as Shrewsbury won promotion to League One as League Two runners-up.

=== Preston North End ===
On 16 May 2012, Wroe joined League One side Preston North End on a two-year contract after rejecting a new contract at Shrewsbury.

Wroe joined League Two side Oxford United on loan until the end of the 2013–14 season on 10 January 2014.

=== Notts County ===
Wroe signed for League One club Notts County on a two-year contract on 30 June 2014. On 15 January 2016 Wroe left Notts County by mutual consent.

=== FC Halifax Town ===
Following a successful loan spell while at Notts County, Wroe signed for National League side FC Halifax Town later that evening.

=== Boston United ===
On 25 January 2019, Wroe signed with Boston United. After 16 games for the club, Wroe got his contract terminated by mutual consent on 8 May 2019.

== International career ==
Wroe was called up to the England C team for their game against Malta under-21s in February 2009. He started the game as England won 4–0. On 19 May 2009, Wroe also played for England C in their 1–0 defeat to Belgium.

== Career statistics ==
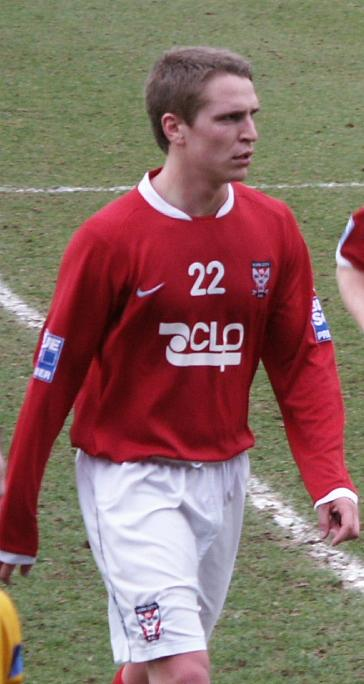
Wroe playing for York City in 2008

As of match played 16 December 2017

Appearances and goals by club, season and competition
Club	Season	League			FA Cup		League Cup		Other		Total	
Club	Season	Division	Apps	Goals	Apps	Goals	Apps	Goals	Apps	Goals	Apps	Goals
Barnsley	2002–03	Second Division	1	0	0	0	0	0	0	0	1	0
Barnsley	2003–04	Second Division	2	1	0	0	0	0	0	0	2	1
Barnsley	2004–05	League One	31	0	1	0	2	0	1 (Note: Appearances in Football League Trophy)	0	35	0
Barnsley	2005–06	League One	12	0	2	0	2	0	0	0	16	0
Barnsley	2006–07	Championship	3	0	0	0	2	0	0	0	5	0
Barnsley	Total		49	1	3	0	6	0	1	0	59	1
Bury (loan)	2006–07	League Two	5	0	0	0	0	0	0	0	5	0
Hamilton Academical	2007–08	Scottish First Division	0	0	0	0	0	0	1 (Note: Appearance in Scottish Challenge Cup)	0	1	0
York City	2007–08	Conference Premier	29	6	2	1	—		9 (Note: Seven appearances and three goals in FA Trophy, two appearances in Conference League Cup)	3	40	10
Torquay United	2008–09	Conference Premier	40	6	5	0	—		8 (Note: Two appearances in Conference League Cup, three in FA Trophy, three appearances and one goal in Conference Premier play-offs)	1	53	7
Torquay United	2009–10	League Two	45	9	2	3	1	0	2	1	50	13
Torquay United	2010–11	League Two	20	3	4	0	1	0	2	0	27	3
Torquay United	Total		105	18	11	3	2	0	12	2	130	23
Shrewsbury Town	2010–11	League Two	18	3	0	0	0	0	2 (Note: Appearances in League Two play-offs)	0	20	3
Shrewsbury Town	2011–12	League Two	38	4	2	1	3	1	1	0	44	6
Shrewsbury Town	Total		56	7	2	1	3	1	3	0	64	9
Preston North End	2012–13	League One	38	8	3	0	3	3	3	0	47	11
Preston North End	2013–14	League One	5	0	0	0	1	0	1	0	7	0
Preston North End	Total		43	8	3	0	4	3	4	0	54	11
Shrewsbury Town (loan)	2013–14	League One	10	0	1	0	0	0	0	0	11	0
Oxford United (loan)	2013–14	League Two	18	2	—		0	0	0	0	18	2
Notts County	2014–15	League One	12	0	2	0	1	0	2	0	17	0
FC Halifax Town (loan)	2015–16	National League	12	2	3	0	—		1 (Note: Appearance(s) in FA Trophy)	1	16	3
FC Halifax Town	2015–16	National League	18	1	0	0	—		6	0	24	1
Bradford Park Avenue	2016–17	National League North	41	6	0	0	—		0	0	41	6
Bradford Park Avenue	2017–18	National League North	20	0	0	0	—		0	0	20	0
Bradford Park Avenue	Total		61	6	0	0	0	0	0	0	61	6
Career total			418	51	27	5	16	4	39	6	500	66

== Honours ==
Torquay United

- Conference Premier play-offs: 2009

Shrewsbury Town

- Football League Two second-place promotion: 2011–12

FC Halifax Town

- FA Trophy: 2015–16
