= Sam Cox (footballer, born 1990) =

Guyanese football manager (born 1990)

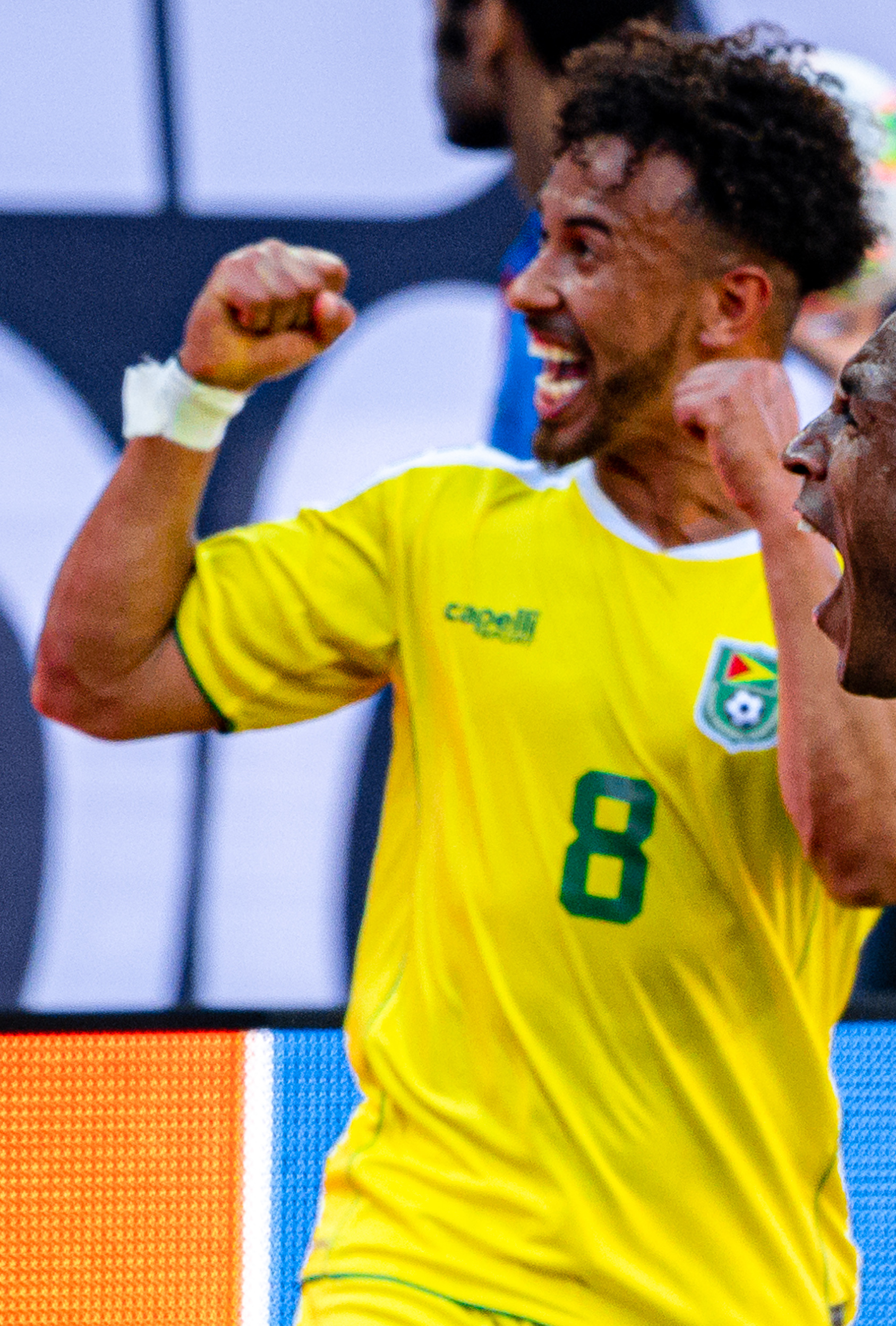
- Cox playing for Guyana at the 2019 CONCACAF Gold Cup

Personal information
- Full name: Samuel Peter Cox
- Date of birth: 10 October 1990 (age 36)
- Place of birth: London, England
- Height: 1.72 m (5 ft 8 in)
- Positions: Left back; central midfielder

Youth career
- 2007–2009: Tottenham Hotspur

Senior career*
Years	Team	Apps	(Gls)
2009–2010	Tottenham Hotspur	0	(0)
2009	→ Cheltenham Town (loan)	1	(0)
2009	→ Histon (loan)	2	(0)
2010	→ Torquay United (loan)	3	(0)
2010–2012	Barnet	10	(0)
2011–2012	→ Boreham Wood (loan)	24	(2)
2012–2013	Hayes & Yeading United	41	(3)
2013–2016	Boreham Wood	98	(1)
2016–2019	Wealdstone	64	(0)
2018–2019	→ Hampton & Richmond Borough (loan)	16	(0)
2019–2021	Hampton & Richmond Borough	40	(0)
2022	Braintree Town	6	(0)
2022–2023	Welling United	13	(0)
Total		318	(6)

International career
2015–2023	Guyana	31	(0)

Managerial career
- 2024: Wealdstone (caretaker)
- 2024: Oxford City
- 2025–2026: Wealdstone
- 2026–: Guyana (assistant)
- * Club domestic league appearances and goals

Samuel Peter Cox (born 10 October 1990) is a football manager and former player who is an assistant manager for the Guyana national team. Born in England, he represented the Guyana national team.

Cox has also appeared in Emmy-winning TV series Ted Lasso, playing Armando, a fictional footballer for West Ham United.

== Club career ==
Cox was "having trials at Watford and Arsenal by the time he was nine years old".

Cox started his career in the Tottenham Hotspur Academy, at the age of 15. He joined the academy full-time in the 2007–08 season. During the 2008–09 season, he made 24 appearances in the under-18 team and two substitute appearances in the reserve team. Cox signed his first professional contract in July 2009.

Martin Allen, manager of League Two side Cheltenham Town, signed Cox on a one-month loan deal on 1 September 2009. He made his debut on 10 October, in Cheltenham's 4–0 away loss to Accrington Stanley. Having failed to break through at Cheltenham he returned to Spurs on 12 October. On 13 November, Cox joined Conference National club Histon on loan for a month. He made his debut in Histon's 2–1 defeat away to Rushden & Diamonds on 14 November, before being substituted in the 67th minute. In January 2010, he joined Torquay United on loan for the remainder of the season.

Cox was released by Spurs at the end of the 2009–10 season and joined Barnet in June 2010. Having made 10 appearances in League Two for Barnet during the 2010–11 season Cox signed on loan for Conference South club Boreham Wood in October 2011. He was awarded 'Player of the Season', having helped the club achieve their highest ever finish in the league. In May 2012, Cox was released by Barnet due to the expiry of his contract.

On 5 July 2012, Hayes & Yeading United announced the signing of Cox on a one-year deal. Cox was immediately announced as captain for the 2012–13 season, at the end of which he was given the 'Supporters' Player of the Year' award.

In summer 2013, Cox went on trial at Greenock Morton and Hamilton Academical, though chose to sign for Boreham Wood again in August 2013. He captained the club as they won promotion to the National League for the first time ever in 2015 and was awarded the 'Chairman's Player of the Season' prize in the same year.

On 2 September 2016, Cox signed for Wealdstone. He was awarded 'Supporters Club Player of the Year' and 'Junior Stones Player of the Year' in May 2017 at the end of his first season for the club. He spent three seasons at the Stones, during which he captained the club.

Cox spent the 2018–19 season on loan at Hampton & Richmond Borough, before signing for the club permanently in September 2019. He departed the club in December 2021. Cox signed for fellow National League South side Braintree Town in March 2022, before moving to Welling United in July 2022, which would be the final club of his playing career.

== International career ==
Cox was born and raised in England, of Guyanese descent. He was called up to the Guyana national team in May 2015. He made his international debut the following month in a 4–4 draw against Saint Vincent and the Grenadines at the Providence Stadium.

He captained Guyana as they qualified for the 2019 CONCACAF Gold Cup, the first time they had qualified for the tournament in their history.

Cox earned a total of 31 caps for Guyana between 2015 and 2023, as well as appearing in four non-FIFA matches for the country.

== Style of play ==
Cox played as a holding midfielder or as a right sided defender.

== Coaching career ==
Cox holds a UEFA A Licence and worked at the Tottenham Hotspur Academy alongside his playing career. In November 2018 he won the Ugo Ehiogu 'Ones To Watch' award at the 'Football Black List'.

In January 2024, Cox left Tottenham and returned to Wealdstone as first team coach and with a view of taking the role in a full-time capacity the following season. On 7 April 2024, Cox was appointed interim manager on a deal until the end of the season following the sacking of David Noble. Having taken the role with five matches remaining, three wins saw the club survive relegation on the final day of the season.

On 18 June 2024, Cox was announced as the manager of National League North side Oxford City. Following a poor start to the season, picking up just six points in his first nine league matches in charge, Cox was sacked on 27 September 2024.

On 5 June 2025, Cox was appointed manager of former club Wealdstone on a permanent basis. On 22 February 2026, he was sacked with the club in 17th position, six points clear of the relegation zone.

== Personal life ==
Cox was Brent Cross cross country champion for four consecutive years from 2003 to 2006 and 800 metres champion three successive years from 2003 to 2005.

He is vegan.

== Career statistics ==
=== Club ===
Appearances and goals by club, season and competition
Club	Season	League			FA Cup		League Cup		Other		Total	
Club	Season	Division	Apps	Goals	Apps	Goals	Apps	Goals	Apps	Goals	Apps	Goals
Tottenham Hotspur	2009–10	Premier League	0	0	0	0	0	0	0	0	0	0
Cheltenham Town (loan)	2009–10	League Two	1	0	0	0	0	0	0	0	1	0
Histon (loan)	2009–10	Conference Premier	2	0	0	0	—		0	0	2	0
Torquay United (loan)	2009–10	League Two	3	0	0	0	0	0	0	0	3	0
Barnet	2010–11	League Two	10	0	0	0	1	0	1 (Note: Appearance in the Football League Trophy)	0	12	0
Boreham Wood (loan)	2011–12	Conference South	24	2	0	0	—		1 (Note: Appearance(s) in the FA Trophy)	0	25	2
Hayes & Yeading United	2012–13	Conference South	41	3	3	0	—		5 (Note: Two appearances in the FA Trophy and three in the Middlesex Senior Cup)	0	49	3
Boreham Wood	2013–14	Conference South	37	0	6	1	—		2 (Note: One appearance in the FA Trophy and one in the Hertfordshire Senior Cup)	0	45	1
Boreham Wood	2014–15	Conference South	39	1	4	0	—		7 (Note: One appearance in the FA Trophy, three in the Hertfordshire Senior Cup and three in the Conference South play-offs)	0	50	1
Boreham Wood	2015–16	National League	22	0	2	0	—		0	0	24	0
Boreham Wood	Boreham Wood total		98	1	12	1	0	0	9	0	119	2
Wealdstone	2016–17	National League South	32	0	3	0	—		8 (Note: Two appearances in the Middlesex Senior Charity Cup, five in the FA Trophy and one in the Middlesex Senior Cup)	0	43	0
Wealdstone	2017–18	National League South	32	0	1	0	—		7 (Note: Two appearances in the Middlesex Senior Cup, five in the FA Trophy)	0	40	0
Wealdstone	2018–19	National League South	0	0	0	0	—		0	0	0	0
Wealdstone	Wealdstone total		64	0	4	0	0	0	15	0	83	0
Hampton & Richmond Borough (loan)	2018–19	National League South	16	0	0	0	—		0	0	16	0
Hampton & Richmond Borough	2019–20	National League South	18	0	0	0	—		3	0	21	0
Hampton & Richmond Borough	2020–21	National League South	11	0	0	0	—		0	0	11	0
Hampton & Richmond Borough	2021–22	National League South	11	0	1	0	—		0	0	12	0
Hampton & Richmond Borough	Hampton & Richmond Borough total		56	0	1	0	0	0	3	0	60	0
Braintree Town	2021–22	National League South	6	0	0	0	—		0	0	6	0
Welling United	2022–23	National League South	13	0	0	0	—		1	0	14	0
Career total			318	6	20	1	1	0	35	0	374	7

=== International ===
Appearances and goals by national team and year
National team	Year	Apps	Goals
Guyana	2015	1	0
Guyana	2016	6	0
Guyana	2018	2	0
Guyana	2019	11	0
Guyana	2021	2	0
Guyana	2022	6	0
Guyana	2023	3	0
Total		31	0

== Managerial statistics ==
As of match played 21 February 2026

Managerial record by team and tenure
Team	From	To	Record					Ref.
Team	From	To	P	W	D	L	Win %	Ref.
Wealdstone (interim)	7 April 2024	21 April 2024	5	3	0	2	60.0	
Oxford City	18 June 2024	27 September 2024	10	2	3	5	20.0	
Wealdstone	5 June 2025	22 February 2026	41	17	9	15	41.5	
Total			56	22	12	22	39.3	
