= Kieran Charnock =

English footballer

Personal information
- Full name: Kieran James Charnock
- Date of birth: 3 August 1984 (age 42)
- Place of birth: Preston, Lancashire, England
- Position: Defender

Team information
- Current team: Bamber Bridge

Youth career
- ?–2001: Wigan Athletic

Senior career*
Years	Team	Apps	(Gls)
2001–2003	Wigan Athletic	0	(0)
2003	→ Southport (loan)	3	(0)
2003–2007	Northwich Victoria	107	(1)
2007–2009	Peterborough United	12	(0)
2008–2009	→ Accrington Stanley (loan)	34	(0)
2009–2011	Torquay United	28	(0)
2010–2011	→ Morecambe (loan)	21	(1)
2011–2012	Morecambe	4	(0)
2011	→ Fleetwood Town (loan)	3	(1)
2012–2013	Fleetwood Town	4	(1)
2012	→ Macclesfield Town (loan)	13	(0)
2013	→ Stockport County (loan)	5	(0)
2013–2014	Stockport County	20	(1)
2014–2015	Chester	37	(1)
2015–2018	Chorley	67	(1)
2018	→ Bamber Bridge (dual registration)		
2018–2020	Bamber Bridge	41	(5)

International career
2005–2007	England C	11	(1)
- * Club domestic league appearances and goals as of 20:29, 28 December 2023 (UTC)

Kieran James Charnock (born 3 August 1984) is an English footballer who plays as a defender.

== Career ==
Born in Preston, Lancashire, Charnock began his career at Wigan Athletic, coming through the club's youth system. However, he failed to establish himself in the squad and was sent out on loan to Southport. Charnock was released by Wigan quickly moving on to Football Conference side Northwich Victoria. He became an important part of the team forming a partnership with Mark Roberts and was chosen for the England non-League team.

At the end of the 2006–07 season Charnock requested a transfer away from Northwich Victoria in search of league football and was sold to Peterborough United for an undisclosed fee. Following a successful loan in the 2008–09 season with Accrington Stanley, he moved to Torquay United at the start of the subsequent season.

In November 2010, he joined Morecambe on an emergency six-week loan.

On 1 August 2012, Charnock joined Football Conference side Macclesfield Town on loan until January 2013. It was announced on 7 May 2013, that Fleetwood would not be offering the defender a new contract, and would therefore be released. On 3 June 2013, it was announced that Charnock had signed for Stockport County, with whom he had spent a loan spell with at the end of the 2012/2013 season.

In 2018, Charnock signed for Bamber Bridge after being released by Chorley.

== Personal life ==
Charnock studied at the University of Salford for a degree in Physiotherapy, graduating in 2015 with first class honours.

== Career statistics ==
As of match played 16 December 2017

Appearances and goals by club, season and competition
Club	Season	League			National Cup		League Cup		Other		Total	
Club	Season	Division	Apps	Goals	Apps	Goals	Apps	Goals	Apps	Goals	Apps	Goals
Southport (loan)	2002–03	Conference	3	0	0	0	—		0	0	3	0
Northwich Victoria	2003–04	Conference	27	0	1	0	—		0	0	28	0
Northwich Victoria	2004–05	Conference National	38	0	0	0	—		1 (Note: Appearance in the FA Trophy)	0	39	0
Northwich Victoria	2005–06	Conference North			4	0	—				4	0
Northwich Victoria	2006–07	Conference National	41	1	0	0	—		3	0	44	1
Northwich Victoria	Northwich total		106	1	5	0	0	0	4	0	115	1
Peterborough United	2007–08	League Two	10	0	2	0	0	0	2 (Note: Appearances in the Football League Trophy)	0	14	0
Peterborough United	2008–09	League One	2	0	0	0	0	0	0	0	2	0
Peterborough United	Peterborough total		12	0	2	0	0	0	2	0	16	0
Accrington Stanley (loan)	2008–09	League Two	34	0	2	0	0	0	0	0	36	0
Torquay United	2009–10	League Two	24	0	3	0	1	0	2	0	30	0
Torquay United	2010–11	League Two	4	0	1	0	0	0	1	0	6	0
Torquay United	Torquay total		28	0	4	0	1	0	3	0	36	0
Morecambe (loan)	2010–11	League Two	21	1	—		0	0	—		21	1
Morecambe	2011–12	League Two	4	0	0	0	1	0	1	0	6	0
Fleetwood Town	2011–12	Conference Premier	4	1	2	1	—		0	0	6	2
Fleetwood Town	2012–13	League Two	3	0	—		0	0	0	0	3	0
Fleetwood Town	Fleetwood total		7	1	2	1	0	0	0	0	9	2
Macclesfield Town (loan)	2012–13	Conference Premier	13	0	1	1	—		1	0	15	1
Stockport County (loan)	2012–13	Conference Premier	5	0	—		—		—		5	0
Stockport County	2013–14	Conference North	20	1	0	0	—		0	0	20	1
Chester	2014–15	Conference Premier	37	1	4	0	—		2	0	43	1
Chorley	2015–16	National League North	31	1	0	0	—		0	0	31	1
Chorley	2016–17	National League North	31	0	1	0	—		0	0	32	0
Chorley	2017–18	National League North	5	0	0	0	—		0	0	5	0
Chorley	Chorley total		67	1	1	0	0	0	0	0	68	1
Career total			357	6	21	2	2	0	13	0	393	8
