= 2009–10 Football League Cup =

Carling Cup, League Cup

Tournament details
- Country: England; Wales
- Dates: 10 August 2009 – 28 February 2010
- Teams: 92

Final positions
- Champions: Manchester United (4th title)
- Runners-up: Aston Villa

Tournament statistics
- Matches played: 93
- Goals scored: 304 (3.27 per match)
- Top goal scorer: Carlos Tevez (6 goals)

The 2009–10 Football League Cup (known as the Carling Cup due to the competition's sponsorship by lager brand Carling) was the 50th season of the Football League Cup, a knock-out competition for the top 92 football clubs played in English football league system. Manchester United successfully defended their League Cup title after defeating Aston Villa by 2–1 in the final at Wembley Stadium on 28 February 2010.

Each season, the League Cup winners – like the winners of the FA Cup – were granted a place in the UEFA Europa League for the following season. However, in cases where a team had already gained a place in European competition via their league position or progress in other cup competitions, their place in the Europa League was deferred to the next-placed league side. In this season, since Manchester United and FA Cup winners Chelsea qualified for the UEFA Champions League via the Premier League, Aston Villa and Liverpool qualified for the Europa League as the sixth- and seventh-placed sides in the league.

== First round ==
The draw for the First Round took place on 16 June 2009, with matches played two months later in the week beginning 10 August 2009.

Newcastle United and Middlesbrough received a first round bye as the highest ranked Football League teams from the previous season's league placings. The other 70 of the 72 Football League clubs competed in the First Round, divided into North and South sections. Each section was divided equally into a pot of seeded clubs and a pot of unseeded clubs. Clubs' rankings depend upon their finishing position in the 2008–09 season.

North
Tie no	Home team	Score^{1}	Away team	Attendance
1	Accrington Stanley (4)	2–1	Walsall (3)	1,041
2	Huddersfield Town (3)	3–1	Stockport County (3)	5,120
3	Rotherham United (4)	2–1	Derby County (2)	4,345
4	Tranmere Rovers (3)	4–0	Grimsby Town (4)	3,527
5	Sheffield Wednesday (2)	3–0	Rochdale (4)	6,696
6	Bury (4)	0–2	West Bromwich Albion (2)	3,077
7	Notts County (4)	0–1	Doncaster Rovers (2)	4,893
8	Lincoln City (4)	0–1	Barnsley (2)	3,635
9	Scunthorpe United (2)	2–1	Chesterfield (4)	2,501
10	Coventry City (2)	0–0	Hartlepool United (3)	6,055
Hartlepool United won 1–0 after extra time
11	Darlington (4)	0–1	Leeds United (3)	4,487
12	Preston North End (2)	5–1	Morecambe (4)	5,407
13	Crewe Alexandra (4)	1–2	Blackpool (2)	2,991
14	Carlisle United (3)	1–0	Oldham Athletic (3)	2,509
15	Nottingham Forest (2)	3–0	Bradford City (4)	4,639
16	Macclesfield Town (4)	0–2	Leicester City (2)	2,197
17	Sheffield United (2)	1–2	Port Vale (4)	7,627

South
Tie no	Home team	Score^{1}	Away team	Attendance
1	Cardiff City(2)	3–1	Dagenham & Redbridge (4)	5,545
2	Wycombe Wanderers (3)	0–4	Peterborough United (2)	2,078
3	Southampton (3)	2–0	Northampton Town (4)	10,921
4	Barnet (4)	0–0	Watford (2)	3,139
Watford won 2–0 after extra time
5	Hereford United (4)	0–0	Charlton Athletic (3)	2,017
Hereford United won 1–0 after extra time
6	Bristol Rovers (3)	2–1	Aldershot Town (4)	3,644
7	Millwall (3)	4–0	AFC Bournemouth (4)	3,552
8	Gillingham (3)	2–1	Plymouth Argyle (2)	3,306
9	Colchester United (3)	1–2	Leyton Orient (3)	3,308
10	Reading (2)	5–1	Burton Albion (4)	5,893
11	Exeter City (3)	0–5	Queens Park Rangers (2)	4,614
12	Cheltenham Town (4)	1–2	Southend United (3)	1,918
13	Brentford (3)	0–1	Bristol City (3)	3,024
14	Yeovil Town (3)	0–4	Norwich City (3)	3,860
15	Crystal Palace (2)	2–1	Torquay United (4)	3,140
16	Milton Keynes Dons (3)	1–4	Swindon Town(3)	4,812
17	Swansea City (2)	3–0	Brighton & Hove Albion (3)	6,400
18	Shrewsbury Town (4)	3–3	Ipswich Town (2)	4,184
3–3 after extra time–Ipswich Town won 4–2 on penalties

^{1} Score after 90 minutes

== Second round ==
The 13 Premier League teams not involved in European competitions entered at this stage, along with the winners from the First Round plus Newcastle United and Middlesbrough, who received a First Round bye. From the Second Round onwards, the teams are no longer split geographically. The draw for the Second Round took place on 12 August 2009, after the First Round games had been completed, and the matches were played in the week beginning 24 August 2009.

Tie no	Home team	Score^{1}	Away team	Attendance
1	West Bromwich Albion (2)	2–2	Rotherham United (4)	10,659
West Bromwich Albion won 4–3 after extra time
2	Norwich City (3)	1–4	Sunderland (1)	12,345
3	Tranmere Rovers (3)	0–1	Bolton Wanderers (1)	5,381
4	Queens Park Rangers (2)	2–1	Accrington Stanley (4)	5,203
5	Bristol City (2)	0–2	Carlisle United (3)	6,359
6	Leyton Orient (3)	0–0	Stoke City (1)	2,742
Stoke City won 1–0 after extra time
7	Port Vale (4)	2–0	Sheffield Wednesday (2)	6,667
8	Hull City (1)	3–1	Southend United (3)	7,994
9	Leeds United (3)	1–1	Watford (2)	14,681
Leeds United won 2–1 after extra time
10	Cardiff City (2)	3–1	Bristol Rovers (3)	9,767
11	Portsmouth (2)	4–1	Hereford United (4)	6,645
12	Crystal Palace (2)	0–2	Manchester City (1)	14,725
13	Wolverhampton Wanderers (1)	0–0	Swindon Town (3)	11,416
0–0 after extra time–Wolverhampton Wanderers won 6–5 on penalties
14	Gillingham (3)	1–3	Blackburn Rovers (1)	7,203
15	Blackpool (2)	4–1	Wigan Athletic (1)	8,089
16	Southampton (3)	1–2	Birmingham City (1)	11,753
17	Preston North End (2)	2–1	Leicester City (2)	6,977
18	Newcastle United (2)	4–3	Huddersfield Town (3)	23,815
19	West Ham United (1)	1–1	Millwall (3)	24,492
West Ham United won 3–1 after extra time
20	Hartlepool United (3)	1–1	Burnley (1)	3,501
Burnley won 2–1 after extra time
21	Nottingham Forest (2)	1–1	Middlesbrough (2)	8,838
Nottingham Forest won 2–1 after extra time
22	Reading (2)	1–2	Barnsley (2)	5,576
23	Swansea City (2)	1–2	Scunthorpe United (2)	7,321
24	Doncaster Rovers (2)	1–5	Tottenham Hotspur (1)	12,923
25	Peterborough United (2)	2–1	Ipswich Town (2)	5,451

^{1} Score after 90 minutes

== Third round ==
The seven Premier League teams involved in European competition enter at this stage, along with the winners from the Second Round. The draw for the Third Round took place on 29 August 2009, after the Second Round games had been played. The matches were played in the week beginning 21 September 2009.

Tie no	Home team	Score^{1}	Away team	Attendance
1	Arsenal (1)	2–0	West Bromwich Albion (2)	56,592
2	Chelsea (1)	1–0	Queens Park Rangers (2)	37,781
3	Bolton Wanderers (1)	1–1	West Ham United (1)	8,050
Bolton Wanderers won 3–1 after extra time
4	Barnsley (2)	3–2	Burnley (1)	6,270
5	Hull City (1)	0–4	Everton (1)	13,558
6	Leeds United (3)	0–1	Liverpool (1)	38,168
7	Manchester United (1)	1–0	Wolverhampton Wanderers (1)	51,160
8	Manchester City (1)	1–1	Fulham (1)	24,507
Manchester City won 2–1 after extra time
9	Sunderland (1)	2–0	Birmingham City (1)	20,576
10	Peterborough United (2)	2–0	Newcastle United (2)	10,298
11	Carlisle United (3)	1–3	Portsmouth (2)	7,042
12	Nottingham Forest (2)	0–1	Blackburn Rovers (1)	11,553
13	Stoke City (1)	4–3	Blackpool (2)	13,957
14	Scunthorpe United (2)	0–0	Port Vale (4)	3,383
Scunthorpe United won 2–0 after extra time
15	Preston North End (2)	1–5	Tottenham Hotspur (1)	16,533
16	Aston Villa (1)	1–0	Cardiff City (2)	22,527

^{1} Score after 90 minutes

== Fourth round ==
The draw for the Fourth Round took place after the Third Round games had been played, on 26 September 2009, and the matches were played on the week beginning on 26 October 2009. The only clubs from outside the Premier League left in the draw were Barnsley, Peterborough United and Scunthorpe United.

Tie no	Home team	Score^{1}	Away team	Attendance
1	Blackburn Rovers (1)	5–2	Peterborough United (2)	8,419
2	Manchester City (1)	5–1	Scunthorpe United (2)	36,358
3	Tottenham Hotspur (1)	2–0	Everton (1)	35,843
4	Barnsley (2)	0–2	Manchester United (1)	20,019
5	Chelsea (1)	4–0	Bolton Wanderers (1)	41,538
6	Sunderland (1)	0–0	Aston Villa (1)	27,666
0–0 after extra time–Aston Villa won 3–1 on penalties
7	Arsenal (1)	2–1	Liverpool (1)	60,004
8	Portsmouth (2)	4–0	Stoke City (1)	11,251

^{1} Score after 90 minutes

== Fifth round ==
The Fifth Round draw took place on 31 October, and the matches were played in the week commencing 30 November 2009.

1 December 2009
19:45

Portsmouth (2)	2–4	Aston Villa (1)
Petrov 10' (o.g.); Kanu 87'	Report	Heskey 12'; Milner 27'; Downing 74'; A. Young 89'

Fratton Park, Portsmouth
Attendance: 17,034
Referee: Lee Mason (Lancashire)

1 December 2009
20:00

Manchester United (1)	2–0	Tottenham Hotspur (1)
Gibson 16', 38'	Report

Old Trafford, Manchester
Attendance: 57,212
Referee: Mark Clattenburg (County Durham)

2 December 2009
19:45

Manchester City (1)	3–0	Arsenal (1)
Tevez 50'; Wright-Phillips 69'; Weiss 89'	Report

City of Manchester Stadium, Manchester
Attendance: 46,015
Referee: Chris Foy (Merseyside)

2 December 2009
20:00

Blackburn Rovers (1)	3–3 (a.e.t.)	Chelsea (1)
Kalinić 9'; Emerton 64'; McCarthy 93' (pen.)	Report	Drogba 48'; Kalou 52'; Ferreira 120+2'
Penalties
McCarthy (penalty scored); Emerton (penalty scored); Grella (penalty scored); Kalinić (penalty missed); Hoilett (penalty scored)	4–3	(penalty missed) Ballack; (penalty scored) Drogba; (penalty scored) Malouda; (penalty scored) Zhirkov; (penalty missed) Kakuta

Ewood Park, Blackburn
Attendance: 18,136
Referee: Alan Wiley (Staffordshire)

== Semi-finals ==
The semi-final draw took place on 2 December 2009, after the completion of the first three Fifth Round matches. The first leg matches were to be played the week commencing 4 January 2010, but adverse weather conditions including severe snow and ice in North West England caused the games to be rearranged.

=== First leg ===
14 January 2010
20:00

Blackburn Rovers (1)	0–1	Aston Villa (1)
	Report	Milner 23'

Ewood Park, Blackburn
Attendance: 18,595
Referee: Mark Clattenburg (County Durham)

19 January 2010
20:00

Manchester City (1)	2–1	Manchester United (1)
Tevez 42' (pen.), 65'	Report	Giggs 17'

City of Manchester Stadium, Manchester
Attendance: 46,067
Referee: Mike Dean (Cheshire)

=== Second leg ===
20 January 2010
19:45

Aston Villa (1)	6–4	Blackburn Rovers (1)
Warnock 30'; Milner 40' (pen.); Nzonzi 53' (o.g.); Agbonlahor 58'; Heskey 62'; A. Young 90+3'	Report	Kalinić 10', 26'; Olsson 63'; Emerton 84'

Villa Park, Birmingham
Attendance: 40,406
Referee: Martin Atkinson (West Yorkshire)

Aston Villa won 7–4 on aggregate.

27 January 2010
20:00

Manchester United	3–1	Manchester City
Scholes 52'; Carrick 71'; Rooney 90+2'	Report	Tevez 76'

Old Trafford, Manchester
Attendance: 74,576
Referee: Howard Webb (South Yorkshire)

Manchester United won 4–3 on aggregate.

== Final ==
The final was played at Wembley Stadium, London, on Sunday, 28 February 2010.

28 February 2010
15:00

Aston Villa	1–2	Manchester United
Milner 5' (pen.)	Report	Owen 12'; Rooney 74'

Wembley Stadium, London
Attendance: 88,596
Referee: Phil Dowd (Staffordshire)

== Prize money ==
The prize money is awarded by the Football League. The winners of the League Cup won £100,000 and the runners-up won £50,000. The losing semi-finalists each took home £25,000.
