= Ben Joyce (footballer) =

English footballer (born 1989)

Personal information
- Full name: Ben Patrick Joyce
- Date of birth: 9 September 1989 (age 37)
- Place of birth: Plymouth, England
- Position: Midfielder

Team information
- Current team: Plymouth Parkway

Youth career
- Aston Villa
- Plymouth Argyle
- Swindon Town

Senior career*
Years	Team	Apps	(Gls)
2007–2009	Swindon Town	4	(1)
2009–2010	Torquay United	0	(0)
2009	→ Weston-super-Mare (loan)		
2009	→ Forest Green Rovers (loan)	2	(0)
2010–2011	Salisbury City		
2012	Kettering Town	9	(1)
2012–2014	Weymouth		
2014	Dorchester Town		
2014–2016	Bodmin Town		
2017–	Plymouth Parkway	27	(3)
- * Club domestic league appearances and goals as of 23:10, 28 December 2017 (UTC)

Ben Patrick Joyce (born 9 September 1989) is an English footballer who plays as a midfielder for Plymouth Parkway.

== Career ==
=== Early career ===
Joyce is a former Plymouth Argyle and Aston Villa striker, but signed for Swindon Town in July 2007 after leaving Plymouth. He came along with assistant manager David Byrne, eventually making his first team debut for Swindon Town on 19 April 2008, scoring a goal in the last minute of a 6–0 win.

=== Torquay United ===
After being released by Swindon in May 2009, Joyce signed for League Two side Torquay United in July. Joyce joined Conference South side Weston-super-Mare on a three-month loan deal in October 2009. He was recalled early from his loan spell however in November and he was sent out on loan to Conference National side Forest Green Rovers until January 2010 as a replacement for Sean Rigg. Joyce left Rovers in January and was released by Torquay on 15 May 2010 along with six other players.

=== Non-League ===
On 29 July 2010 Joyce signed for Salisbury City on a free transfer. He became part of a very prominent forward line at the Ray Mac as The Whites looked to win promotion.

After a trial period at Kettering, Joyce joined the Poppies on non-contract terms in March 2012. Joyce made his Kettering debut in a 1–0 loss against Hayes & Yeading United on 10 March 2012.

On 23 July 2012 Joyce signed for Weymouth. On 6 May 2014 Dorchester Town manager Phil Simkin confirmed that Joyce had signed for Dorchester Town. However, he joined Bodmin Town in December that year. He remained at the club until signing for Wadebridge Town for the 2016–17 season.

On 1 June 2017 it was announced that Joyce had signed for South West Peninsula League side Plymouth Parkway.
