= 2008–09 Tottenham Hotspur F.C. season =

English football club season

Tottenham Hotspur F.C.
2008–09 season
- Chairman: Daniel Levy
- Manager: Juande Ramos (until 25 October); Harry Redknapp (from 25 October)
- Premier League: 8th
- FA Cup: Fourth round
- Football League Cup: Runners-up
- UEFA Cup: Round of 32
- Top goalscorer: League: Darren Bent (12); All: Darren Bent (17)
- Highest home attendance: 36,183 (vs. Liverpool, 1 November 2008)
- Lowest home attendance: 35,507 (vs. Bolton Wanderers, 26 October 2008)
- Average home league attendance: 35,929
| Home colours | Away colours | Third colours |

The 2008–09 season was the 127th season in the history of Tottenham Hotspur Football Club, their 31st consecutive season in the top flight of English football and their 17th consecutive season in the FA Premier League. The club also participated in the FA Cup, Football League Cup and UEFA Cup.

After finishing 11th in the 2007–08 Premier League, Tottenham began the season under the leadership of Spaniard Juande Ramos, drafted in to replace Martin Jol midway through the previous season. However, after suffering the worst start of a league season in Tottenham's history, with no wins in eight league games and only two points, Ramos was sacked and replaced by seasoned manager Harry Redknapp, who quickly eliminated the continental structure that the club had established over the past seasons. Tottenham's league form improved and mainly remained positive with the final position of eighth a far cry from the relegation places Tottenham had occupied throughout the campaign. Spurs also reached the final of the League Cup, and, as the reigning champions, faced league leaders Manchester United but lost 4–1 on penalties. With an average attendance of 35,929, Tottenham had the ninth-highest attendance in the Premier League.

Tottenham drafted in a total of 15 players through transfers and sold 19 players during the combined summer and winter transfer windows.

== 2008–09 season ==
=== Pre-season ===
==== Transfers ====
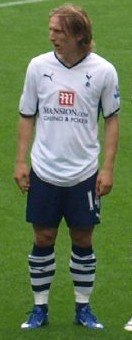
Luka Modrić – Tottenham's most expensive signing of the 2008–09 season

At the end of the 2007–08 season, which saw Tottenham finish 11th in the Premier League, the club announced the signing of Croatian playmaker Luka Modrić and reiterated that any club wishing to sign Bulgarian striker Dimitar Berbatov would need to offer more than £30 million. Tottenham's transfer movement began immediately, with Czech goalkeeper Radek Černý moving on a free transfer to Queens Park Rangers following the end of the season; Černý's loan deal had expired and was not offered a contract extension by Tottenham nor his parent club, Slavia Prague. Little under a month later, Tottenham agreed a deal with Barcelona for 19-year-old Mexican forward Giovani dos Santos for an initial fee of £4.7 million. Not long afterwards, Tottenham reached a deal with Dutch club PSV for Brazilian goalkeeper Heurelho Gomes, valued at around £8 million.

Following comments made by Sir Alex Ferguson indicating confidence over signing Dimitar Berbatov despite negotiations not yet underway, the club issued a press statement on 18 July 2008 on behalf of Daniel Levy, saying that both Manchester United and Liverpool had been reported to the Premier League over comments their respective managers had made which were seen as unsettling both Berbatov and Irish striker Robbie Keane with a view of enticing them away from Tottenham. Levy said of United boss Alex Ferguson:

"Today's public comments by Manchester United's manager, announcing that he has made an offer for Dimitar and is confident that the deal will go through with time working in their favour, is a blatant example of sheer arrogance and interference with one of our players. It is also probably one of the worst offences by any manager in the Premier League to date and is unbelievably hypocritical given his recent comments in respect of Cristiano Ronaldo and Real Madrid.

"I have absolutely no wish to sell either player and to date we have not accepted any offer for either. However, when a player's head is turned and their commitment is absent, particularly when they occupy key positions such as that of striker, they become a negative influence in a team dressing room in which they were once a positive addition and influence. This is the situation we now have on our hands, with both Dimitar and Robbie having made it clear that they wish to leave for Manchester United and Liverpool respectively."

Throughout July, Tottenham parted ways with many first team members of the squad. On 23 July 2008, it was announced that the club had sold the services of Teemu Tainio; the Finnish midfielder joined Sunderland on a three-year contract, while French defender Pascal Chimbonda followed him a day later, joining the same club for an undisclosed fee. The following day, former England goalkeeper Paul Robinson signed a five-year contract with Blackburn Rovers for £3.5 million, having played for Spurs for four years. Robinson joined the club from Leeds United in May 2004 and made 175 appearances for the club in all competitions, scoring once against Watford in 2007.

On 28 July 2008, Tottenham agreed to sell Robbie Keane to Liverpool for a total that could amount to £20.3 million. With the sale, Tottenham also agreed to drop its official complaint to the Premier League regarding Liverpool's pursuit of Keane after Liverpool issued a formal apology and made a donation to the Tottenham Foundation.

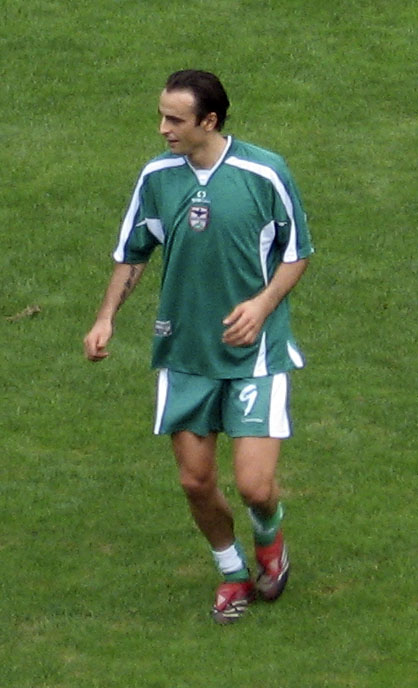
Dimitar Berbatov joined Manchester United within moments of the summer transfer window's closure

Levy issued a statement coinciding with the confirmation of the Keane transfer:

"I was incredibly disappointed when I first heard, not only that Liverpool had been working behind the scenes to bring Robbie to Anfield, but that Robbie himself wanted to go and he submitted a transfer request to this effect. I have already made my opinion clear on the nature of this transaction. I don't regard it as a transfer deal – that is something which happens between two clubs when they both agree to trade – this is very much an enforced sale, for which we have agreed a sum of £19m as compensation plus a potential further £1.3m in additional compensation."

On 30 July 2008, French midfielder Steed Malbranque became the third player in a week to leave, following Tainio and Chimbonda to Sunderland for a fee of £7.8 million. Later the same day, Tottenham announced they had reached agreement with Blackburn for the transfer of David Bentley to the club for £15 million.

Totttenham made their first transfer move in the month of August with the signing of veteran goalkeeper César from Real Zaragoza on 8 August 2008. The deal was initially a season-long loan with the permanent signing being completed at the end of the 2008–09 season. The first Tottenham departure in August was French defender Younès Kaboul, who on 11 August 2008 joined Portsmouth for an undisclosed fee. Towards the end of August, two more players left, with Anthony Gardner moving to Hull City and Lee Young-pyo leaving for Borussia Dortmund.

==== Friendlies ====
As part of their pre-season preparations, Tottenham held a training camp in Spain, along with numerous friendlies, in July. Their first friendly, against local side Tavernes, saw Spurs stroll to an 8–0 success, with Giovanni dos Santos scoring his first goals for the club. Tottenham then faced two of Juande Ramos' former teams in Dénia and Hércules. Spurs beat Dénia 4–2 and then curtailed the Spanish section of their preparations with a 1–1 with Hércules.

Tottenham returned to England to play Norwich City, recovering from being a goal down to win 5–1, with Darren Bent netting four of the strikes. They later played Leyton Orient, again winning 5–1 with Luka Modrić scoring his first goal for Spurs and Bent scoring a hat-trick to take his tally to nine goals in five games. Tottenham then embarked to the Netherlands to play in the Feyenoord Jubilee Tournament, held in Rotterdam at the start of August, with a 2–0 victory over Celtic thanks to goals from Bent and David Bentley. Spurs followed this with another win, over German club Borussia Dortmund 3–0 with goals from Bent, Dos Santos and Jamie O'Hara. Tottenham were crowned the winners of the tournament on 3 August.

Tottenham finished their pre-season preparations with a 5–0 victory over Serie A giants Roma, which ensured they stayed unbeaten throughout the period, scoring 33 goals and conceding 5 in a total of 7 games, with Darren Bent scoring 13 times.

=== August ===
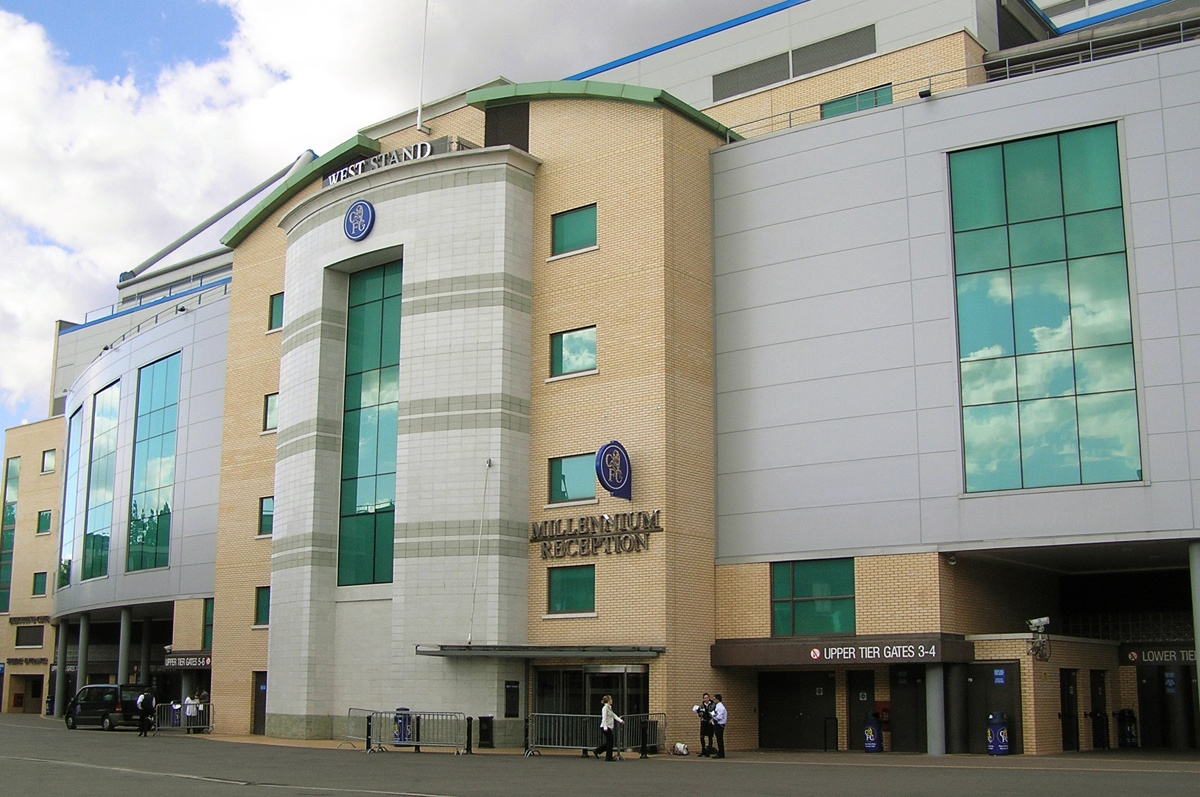
Stamford Bridge was the venue for Tottenham's first point of the season

Tottenham's league season got off to a poor start with a 2–1 loss to Middlesbrough at the Riverside Stadium, followed a week later by another 2–1 defeat to Sunderland, with debutant Djibril Cissé scoring the winning goal in the final minutes. The defeats against Middlesbrough and Sunderland were punctuated with the ongoing transfer saga concerning Dimitar Berbatov and Manchester United; rumours that Berbatov had refused to play (later revealed to be true) began to circulate, along with the theory that this refusal from one of Tottenham's best players was hurting team morale. Tottenham got their first point of the season eight days after the Sunderland loss in a 1–1 draw at Stamford Bridge against title contenders Chelsea. With both the end of August and the summer transfer window approaching, the Berbatov saga ended with him making a transfer to Manchester United for £30.75 million and young striker Fraizer Campbell coming on loan for the entire season. Manchester City had tried to enter the fray in the final hours with a £30 million bid accepted but Berbatov rejected the move. Vedran Ćorluka also completed his move from Manchester City to join Croatian teammate Luka Modrić and provide competition for the right-back position.

=== September ===
Tottenham's first match in September led to another 2–1 loss, at home to Aston Villa. This resulted in three losses in four and one point from a possible twelve, rooting Spurs to the bottom of the Premier League table. Tottenham achieved their first competitive win of the season in the UEFA Cup against Wisła Kraków, with David Bentley scoring his debut and the winning goal. Spurs returned to the league with a goalless home draw against Wigan Athletic and a tepid 2–0 away defeat to Portsmouth, with ex-Tottenham player Jermain Defoe scoring a penalty. At the end of September, Tottenham were bottom of the league and officially suffering their worst Premier League start. Spurs, however, were able to make a successful start to the defence of their League Cup title, defeating Newcastle United 2–1 at St James' Park to progress to the fourth round of the competition.

=== October ===
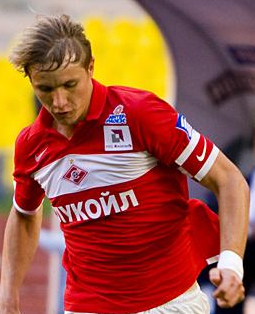
Roman Pavlyuchenko scored his first league goal in Tottenham's first win over Bolton Wanderers at White Hart Lane

October started with progression to the group stages of the UEFA Cup for Tottenham with a 1–1 draw in Poland against Wisła Kraków in their second leg tie, but Spurs' horrendous league form continued with a home loss to newly promoted Hull City, Geovanni's long range free-kick in the early minutes of the game condemning Tottenham to another loss, They then followed this match with another battle against a newly promoted side, Stoke City. The match concluded with Tottenham conceding two penalties and having Michael Dawson and Gareth Bale sent off in a 2–1 loss. This loss meant that Tottenham had only two points from eight games, were bottom of the Premier League and now were amidst the worst start to a season in their 126-year history. The ever-increasing pressure on manager Juande Ramos grew after a 2–0 loss in Italy to Udinese in the first match of the UEFA Cup group stage.

On 25 October, the club announced the departure, with immediate effect, of sporting director Damien Comolli, head coach Juande Ramos and first team coaches Marcos Álvarez and Gus Poyet. It was announced, within hours, that the club had agreed a deal worth £5 million with Portsmouth to permit manager Harry Redknapp to become the new head coach at Spurs.

Redknapp was unveiled as Tottenham manager the same day before the home match against Bolton Wanderers and gave the team talk, although the team itself was selected by Clive Allen and Alex Inglethorpe. Tottenham eased to their first league win of the season, with Roman Pavlyuchenko scoring his first Premier League goal. Tottenham then faced bitter rivals Arsenal in the latest installment of the North London derby; the match ended 4–4 and viewed as one of the best games in the long history of the derby. Tottenham took the lead with a stunning David Bentley volley from 35-yards, while Arsenal responded with a Mikaël Silvestre header and found themselves 3–1 ahead deep inside the second half. Darren Bent made it 3–2 before Robin van Persie seemingly wrapped up the points making it 4–2 to Arsenal. With five minutes left, however, Jermaine Jenas made it 4–3 after capitalising on a Gaël Clichy slip, and then Aaron Lennon salvaged a point for Tottenham when he, four minutes into stoppage time, made it 4–4 with a tap-in.

=== November ===
Tottenham's revitalised form continued into November with a win over league leaders Liverpool. Dirk Kuyt blasted Liverpool into an early lead before a Jamie Carragher own goal and a Pavlyuchenko tap-in gave Spurs the three points. Five days later, Redknapp took charge of his first Tottenham UEFA Cup match, which ended with Tottenham thrashing Dinamo Zagreb 4–0 on the strength of a Darren Bent hat-trick.

The first away win for Tottenham's season came on 9 November 2008, with a 2–1 win over Manchester City; Bent scored his fifth goal in two games. Tottenham's fourth game in eleven days sent them to fifth round of the League Cup with a 4–2 win over Liverpool, which also included the first goals for on-loan striker Fraizer Campbell.

Tottenham's six-game unbeaten run ended with a 2–1 loss to Fulham; a mistake from Heurelho Gomes helped Fulham into a two-goal lead before Fraizer Campbell pulled one back. Tottenham recovered quickly with a 1–0 win over Blackburn, increasing the pressure on Blackburn manager Paul Ince. The club followed this with another 1–0 win against NEC in the UEFA Cup, almost assuring safe passage to the next round.

November ended with a 1–0 home loss to Everton. Steven Pienaar's deflected effort, later attributed as a Vedran Ćorluka own goal, was enough to get the victory for Everton.

=== December ===
Tottenham began December by putting themselves into the semi-finals of the League Cup with a 2–1 win over Watford. Watford had taken the lead through a Tamas Priskin strike but a penalty from Roman Pavlyuchenko and a goal from Darren Bent earned Spurs a tie against Burnley in the semi-finals. Tottenham continued their decent league form with a 2–0 win over West Ham United which also included Ledley King's first goal in three years.

Spurs then faced defending Premier League champions Manchester United in a home tie which ended in a 0–0 draw, which meant that Tottenham were now unbeaten against the Premier League's top four. Tottenham then completed their UEFA Cup group stage with a 2–2 draw with Spartak Moscow; they proceeded to the next stage in the runner-up place to face UEFA Champions League drop-outs Shakhtar Donetsk.

Tottenham faced Newcastle at St James' Park in a losing 2–1 effort. The match was heading for a 1–1 draw until Damien Duff scored in stoppage time to give Newcastle the three points. Five days later, Tottenham opposed Fulham in the return match at White Hart Lane, the match ending 0–0.

December ended the same as November: with a loss, this time to newly promoted West Bromwich Albion. The 2–0 win was controversial, however, as defender Michael Dawson claimed that he had been fouled by West Brom striker Roman Bednář while the latter scored the opening goal. The goal stood and Tottenham ended the year still very much in a relegation battle.

=== January Transfer Window ===
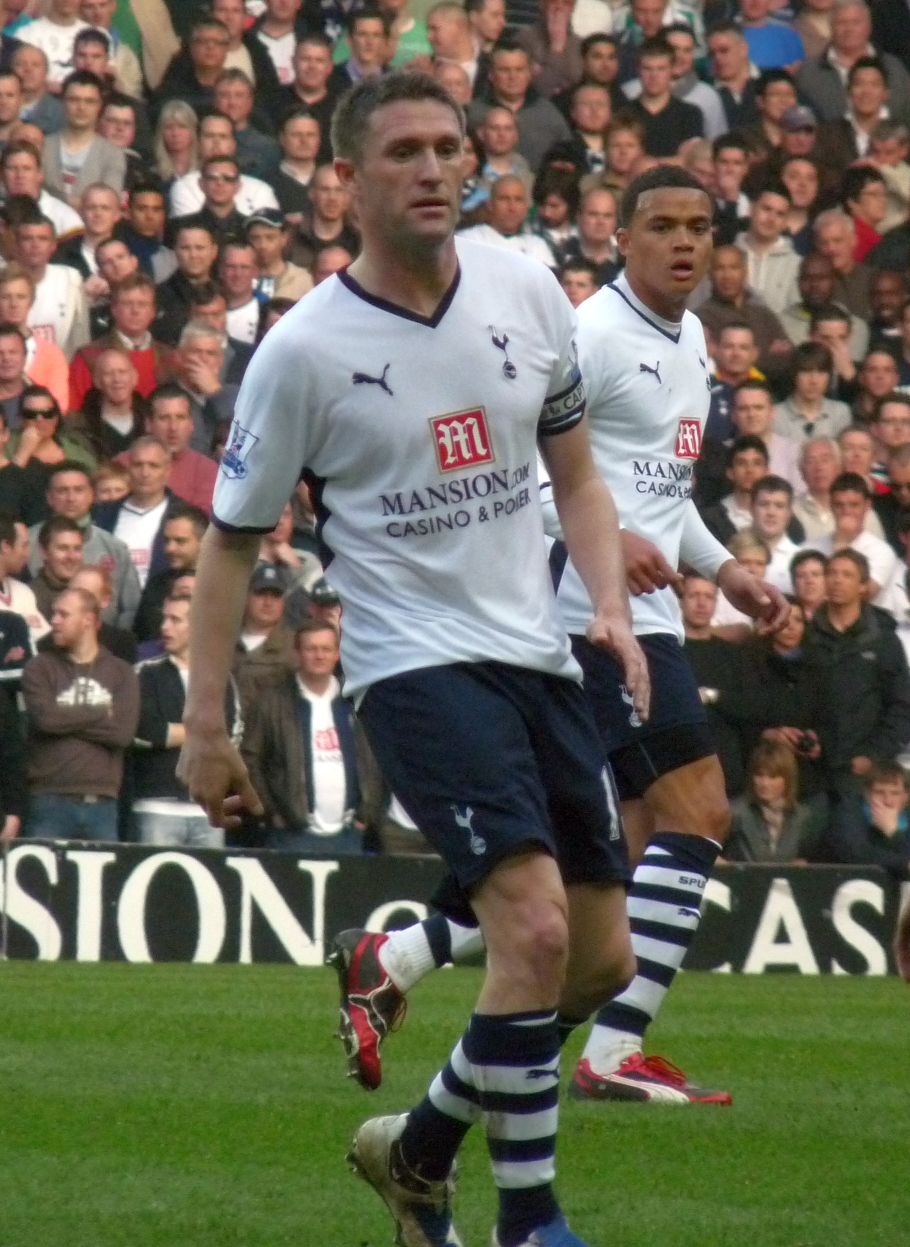
Robbie Keane returned to Tottenham only six months after his move to Liverpool

With the January transfer window opening on 1 January, Tottenham made movement in the market straight away. On 6 January 2009, Jermain Defoe returned to the club from Portsmouth in a deal worth an initial £9 million, with extras and the writing-off of past transfer fees in Pedro Mendes and Defoe himself; the media announced the total fee at £15 million. Just over two weeks later, Tottenham came to an agreement for the transfer of Wilson Palacios for a fee of £12 million from Wigan Athletic; the deal for Palacios was officially concluded on 30 January with the approval of a work permit. Tottenham also signed experienced goalkeeper Carlo Cudicini from Chelsea on a free transfer and also concluded a deal to re-sign Pascal Chimbonda from Sunderland for a fee thought to be around £3 million. On the final day of the transfer window, Tottenham resigned their third former player in a month, signing striker Robbie Keane for a fee of an initial £12 million, which, depending on circumstances, could rise to £15 million.

The departures in January saw Andy Barcham made his loan move to Gillingham permanently for an undisclosed fee. Four days later, Charlie Daniels left Tottenham to join Leyton Orient on a free transfer. On 21 January, Spanish goalkeeper César's contract was cancelled so he could return to Spain to sign for Valencia. Two days later, Tottenham outcast Hossam Ghaly joined Saudi Arabian club Al Nassr for an undisclosed fee.

=== January ===
January began well for Tottenham, advancing to the next round of the FA Cup with a 3–1 win over Wigan and then following that with a 4–1 win against Burnley in the League Cup semi-final first leg. However, Tottenham's league form again suffered when in the next game, against Wigan, Spurs lost 1–0 when Maynor Figueroa powered in a header in stoppage time to confine Tottenham to another loss from last-minute goals.

Tottenham responded seven days later with a 1–1 draw against Portsmouth at White Hart Lane. The match had massive publicity because of the return of Harry Redknapp and Jermain Defoe. In the match, David Nugent scored a deflected goal before Defoe returned to haunt his old club by scoring the equaliser.

Tottenham then faced Burnley in the League Cup semi-final second leg. Burnley could only progress by winning by three clear goals and it was widely seen as unlikely that Burnley would offer much in terms of opposition. After 90 minutes, however, goals from Robbie Blake, Chris McCann and Jay Rodriguez took the game to extra time and if they held on they would progress thanks to the away goals rule, but facing elimination with under three minutes left to play, goals from Roman Pavlyuchenko and Jermain Defoe saw Spurs progress to the final 6–4 on aggregate.

Three days after the extra-time tie, Tottenham faced Manchester United in the FA Cup, losing 2–1, having taken the lead through Pavlyuchenko before a deflected goal from Paul Scholes and a strike from Dimitar Berbatov ended eliminated the side from the competition.

Three days later, Tottenham got their first league win in six games with a 3–1 home win over Stoke. Brilliant play saw Spurs take a 3–0 lead in the first 30 minutes before James Beattie scored a consolation goal for the visitors. January ended in defeat for Spurs with 3–2 loss to Bolton. Bolton took a 2–0 lead before a Darren Bent double levelled until another last minute goal from Kevin Davies claimed the points for the home side.

=== February ===
February for Tottenham started with the North London derby against Arsenal. The highly anticipated match ended 0–0 with Spurs enjoying the dominant moments in the game, thanks in part to the first-half sending-off of Arsenal midfielder Emmanuel Eboué. An 11-day rest period ended with a trip to Ukraine to face Shakhtar Donetsk in the last 32 of the UEFA Cup. Tottenham lost 2–0 thanks to late goals from Evhen Seleznyov and Jádson. The match incurred criticism due to Tottenham playing a weakened side, however the criticisms were brushed aside by Redknapp, who emphatically prioritized the Premier League and League Cup over the UEFA Cup. On 23 February, Tottenham faced Hull City at the KC Stadium in the Monday night fixture. Spurs eased to a 2–1 win with goals from Aaron Lennon and Jonathan Woodgate, sealing a valuable set of points.

Tottenham ended the February set of fixtures only three days later with the return leg of Shakhtar. Tottenham again fielded a severely weakened team due in part to the 2009 Football League Cup Final being only three days away, and earned a valiant 1–1 draw, with Giovani dos Santos scoring his first Tottenham goal before a late Fernandinho goal sealed the leg for Shakhtar in the dying moments to eliminate Spurs from Europe.

=== March ===
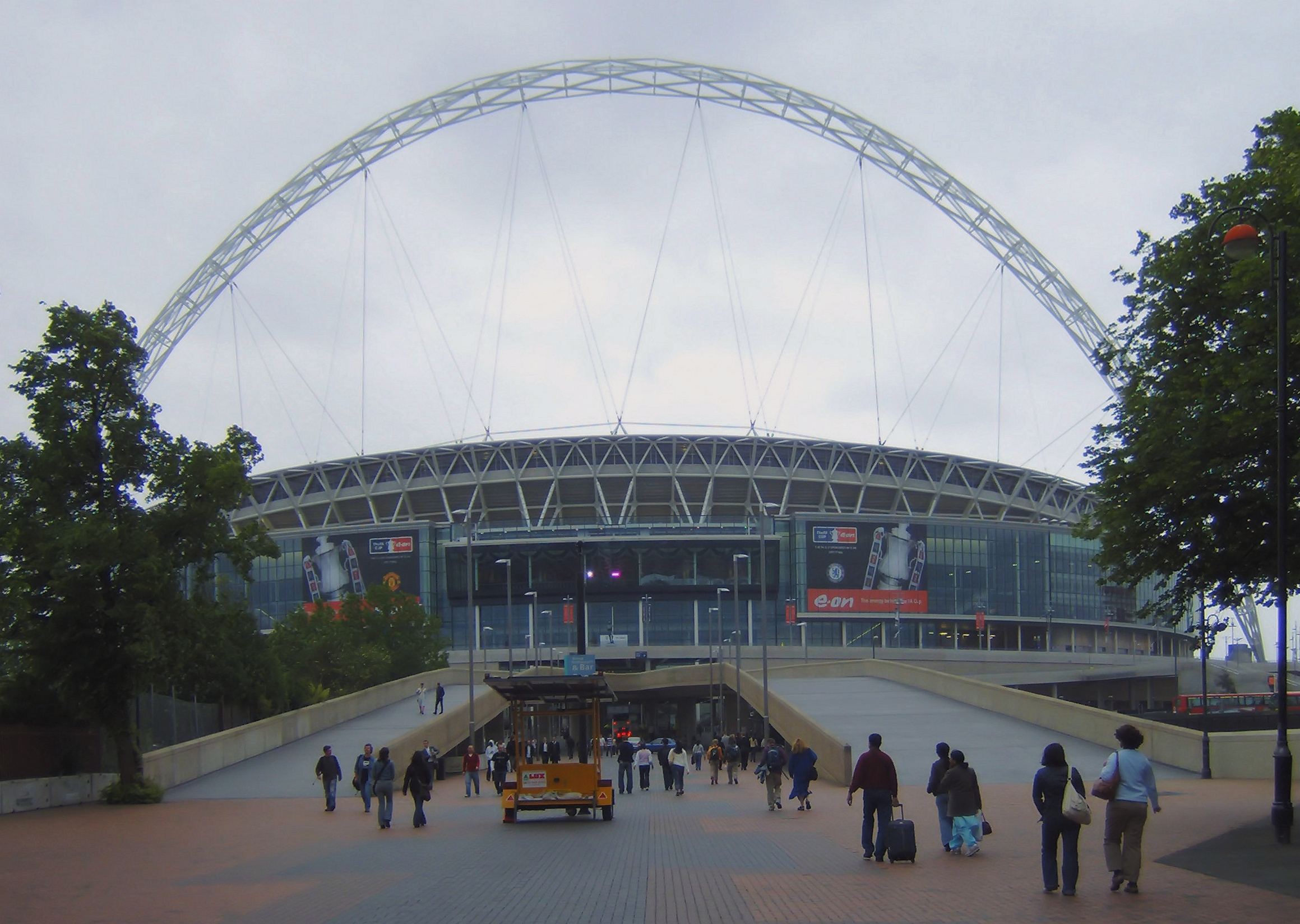
Tottenham visited Wembley two years consecutively, In 2008–09 they entered as incumbent League Cup Champions

March began with the 2009 League Cup Final against Manchester United. The frantic final ended 0–0 and resulted in a penalty shoot-out, which United won 4–1 to win the first major trophy of the 2008–09 season.

Tottenham rebounded from the heart-break of the final loss three days later with a comprehensive 4–0 win over Middlesbrough to ease the immediate relegation concerns. The unbeaten run continued with a 1–1 at Sunderland on 7 March. The tense match began with an early goal for Kieran Richardson and remained so until in the dying embers of the game, where Robbie Keane struck a volley to earn Spurs a point. Eight days later, Tottenham faced fourth-placed Aston Villa at Villa Park. An early goal from Jermaine Jenas gave Spurs the lead until early in the second-half when the lead was extended thanks to a Darren Bent tap-in; John Carew stuck a consolation goal as Tottenham took the three points. Days before the last match of the March fixtures, Tottenham announced a record amount of profit in the 2008 fiscal year.

Tottenham faced Chelsea in the final match in March at White Hart Lane. In a thrilling London derby, Tottenham took maximum points thanks to a second-half goal from Luka Modrić and a much improved performance by goalkeeper Heurelho Gomes, putting Tottenham only three away from a European place.

March ended with three call-ups into the England squad with Aaron Lennon in, thanks to being in mercurial form during the month of March and Ledley King earning a shock call-up, though with the injury situation surrounding the defender, King had to withdraw from the squad three days later. Darren Bent also received a call up on 28 March, after an injury to Carlton Cole ruled him out of the World Cup qualifier against Ukraine.

=== April ===
The penultimate month of the Premier League season began with a trip to Ewood Park, on 4 April, to face relegation-battlers Blackburn. Tottenham took the lead through a Robbie Keane penalty and led until the 80th minute, when the contentious sending off of Wilson Palacios swung the game back in Blackburn's favour, and two late goals from Benni McCarthy and André Ooijer gave the three points to the home side.

Seven days later, Tottenham faced West Ham in a London derby. The match ended 1–0 thanks to a solo effort from the returning Roman Pavlyuchenko. The win ignited Tottenham's charge into the final Europa league place which was consolidated eight days later on 19 April, with another 1–0 win, this time over struggling Newcastle. An early Darren Bent goal was enough to secure the points and help steer the club further towards European football.

April ended with a defeat to league leaders Manchester United at Old Trafford. Tottenham led 2–0 through two quick-fire strikes from Darren Bent and Luka Modrić, but in the second-half, United were awarded a penalty by referee Howard Webb and went on to win the game 5–2. Webb later admitted that he had got the penalty decision wrong. The loss damaged Tottenham's hopes of a seventh-place finish.

=== May ===
Against the norm, there were four Premier League fixtures in May. Tottenham took on relegation strugglers West Brom at White Hart Lane, looking to bounce back from the heavy defeat at Old Trafford. The game was settled by a well-placed Jermaine Jenas effort from just outside the area on the stroke of half-time, and secured Spurs' fifth home win a row. It was their fourth 1–0 win at home in a row, and sixth consecutive home clean sheet, leaving them on the verge of a club record of the fewest goals conceded at home in a season.

A week later, Tottenham travelled to Goodison Park. The game was marred by the pre-match news that the brother of Wilson Palacios had been confirmed dead in his native Honduras, causing him to leave the team hotel hours before the game. This was one of many factors that caused Harry Redknapp to go with an unorthodox 3–5–2 formation, notably bringing in Gareth Bale at left wing-back for the Welsh youngster's first league start for four months. The match finished 0–0, and for the second consecutive season earned Tottenham a point in their European quest.

The following Saturday, Tottenham went into their final home game of the season against Manchester City, with a target of setting a new club record for goals conceded at home. They simply had to concede no more than a goal to break the record of 11, which had stood since 1920. Spurs could also end Manchester City's hopes of Europe next season, while increasing their own slender hopes. Tottenham took the lead in the 29th minute when Jermain Defoe improvised with a back-heel from close range from Tom Huddlestone's cross. In the second-half, Spurs were forced to rue their earlier missed chances when Valeri Bojinov grabbed an equaliser, in the process scoring the first away goal at the lane since James Beattie's consolation in January. A draw was looking increasingly likely until Fraizer Campbell was brought down to win a penalty, which was converted by Robbie Keane. The game finished 2–1 and Tottenham, having conceded just ten goals at home all season, broke their own club record and ensured ending the season with the best home defence in the 2008–09 season.

Tottenham went into the final game of the season at Anfield, with a small chance of finishing in seventh place and Europe, needing to beat Liverpool and hoping that Everton could earn three points against Fulham at Craven Cottage; Everton, however, won 2–0. In Spurs' match, Fernando Torres and an own goal by Alan Hutton had Liverpool 2–0 up. A goal from Robbie Keane on his return to Anfield gave Tottenham a glimmer of hope, but just three minutes later Yossi Benayoun scored for the home team, condemning Tottenham to a 3–1 loss to finish their domestic league season.

Spurs finished the season in eighth, a turnaround in form pushing them into higher reaches of the league, when they were as low as 19th place as recently as January and 20th for a part of the season. Having made their worst start to a league season in their 126-year history, Tottenham made a three place improvement on the 2007–08 season.

== Transfers ==
=== In ===
| Date | Player | Previous club | Cost |
|---|---|---|---|
| 30 May 2008 | (England) John Bostock | (England) Crystal Palace | £700,000 |
| 30 June 2008 | (Italy) Mirko Ranieri | (Italy) Perugia | £1,100,000 |
| 1 July 2008 | (Democratic Republic of the Congo) Paul-José M'Poku | (Belgium) Standard Liège | £2,600,000 |
| 1 July 2008 | (Croatia) Luka Modrić | (Croatia) Dinamo Zagreb | £16,200,000 |
| 1 July 2008 | (Mexico) Giovani dos Santos | (Spain) Barcelona | £5,400,000 |
| 1 July 2008 | (Brazil) Heurelho Gomes | (Netherlands) PSV | £7,800,000 |
| 30 July 2008 | (England) David Bentley | (England) Blackburn Rovers | £15,300,000 |
| 8 August 2008 | (Spain) César | (Spain) Real Zaragoza | £3,4000,000 |
| 30 August 2008 | (Russia) Roman Pavlyuchenko | (Russia) Spartak Moscow | £14,500,000 |
| 1 September 2008 | (Croatia) Vedran Ćorluka | (England) Manchester City | £8,500,000 |
| 6 January 2009 | (England) Jermain Defoe | (England) Portsmouth | £9,400,000 |
| 21 January 2009 | (Honduras) Wilson Palacios | (England) Wigan Athletic | £12,300,000 |
| 26 January 2009 | (Italy) Carlo Cudicini | (England) Chelsea | £1,200,000 |
| 26 January 2009 | (France) Pascal Chimbonda | (England) Sunderland | £4,500,000 |
| 2 February 2009 | (Republic of Ireland) Robbie Keane | (England) Liverpool | £12,200,000 |
| Total | | | £104.5 million + |

=== Out ===
| Date | Player | New Club | Cost |
|---|---|---|---|
| 1 July 2008 | (Czech Republic) Radek Černý | (England) Queens Park Rangers | Free |
| 1 July 2008 | (England) Joe Martin | (England) Blackpool | Undisclosed |
| 7 July 2008 | (England) Tommy Forecast | (England) Southampton | Undisclosed |
| 23 July 2008 | (Finland) Teemu Tainio | (England) Sunderland | £5,000,000 |
| 25 July 2008 | (England) Paul Robinson | (England) Blackburn | £3,500,000 |
| 26 July 2008 | (France) Pascal Chimbonda | (England) Sunderland | £5,000,000 |
| 28 July 2008 | (Republic of Ireland) Robbie Keane | (England) Liverpool | £19,000,000 |
| 30 July 2008 | (France) Steed Malbranque | (England) Sunderland | £7,000,000 |
| 11 August 2008 | (France) Younès Kaboul | (England) Portsmouth | £6,000,000 |
| 14 August 2008 | (England) Anthony Gardner | (England) Hull City | £2,500,000 |
| 27 August 2008 | (South Korea) Lee Young-pyo | (Germany) Borussia Dortmund | Undisclosed |
| 1 September 2008 | (Bulgaria) Dimitar Berbatov | (England) Manchester United | £30,750,000 |
| 21 December 2008 | (Canada) Paul Stalteri | (Germany) Borussia Mönchengladbach | Released |
| 29 December 2008 | (Norway) Dag Alexander Olsen | (Spain) Valencia | Undisclosed |
| 2 January 2009 | (England) Andy Barcham | (England) Gillingham | Undisclosed |
| 6 January 2009 | (England) Charlie Daniels | (England) Leyton Orient | Free |
| 21 January 2009 | (Spain) César | (Spain) Valencia | Undisclosed |
| 23 January 2009 | (Egypt) Hossam Ghaly | (Saudi Arabia) Al Nassr | Undisclosed |
| 9 February 2009 | (England) Leigh Mills | Unattached | Released |
| Total | | | £78.75 million + |

=== Trials ===
| Date | Player | Club | Result |
|---|---|---|---|
| 6 January 2009 | (Ghana) Stephen Appiah | Free Agent | Unsuccessful |
| 16 January 2009 | (Ghana) Quincy Owusu-Abeyie | Spartak Moscow | Unsuccessful |

=== Loan arrivals ===
| Date | Player | Club | Loan Length |
|---|---|---|---|
| 2 September 2008 | (England) Fraizer Campbell | Manchester United | 24 May 2009 |

=== Loan departures ===
| Loan Start Date | Player | Club | Loan End Date |
|---|---|---|---|
| 11 July 2008 | (England) Jake Livermore | Crewe Alexandra | 23 July 2008 |
| 26 August 2008 | (England) Charlie Daniels | Gillingham | 29 September 2008 |
| 8 August 2008 | (England) Troy Archibald-Henville | Norwich City | 10 November 2008 |
| 16 October 2008 | (England) Ben Alnwick | Carlisle United | 17 November 2008 |
| 19 September 2008 | (England) David Button | Grays Athletic | 20 November 2008 |
| 2 July 2008 | (England) Simon Dawkins | Leyton Orient | 1 January 2009 |
| 8 August 2008 | (England) Leigh Mills | Gillingham | 1 January 2009 |
| 26 August 2008 | (Czech Republic) Tomáš Pekhart | Southampton | 1 January 2009 |
| 25 September 2008 | (England) Andy Barcham | Gillingham | 2 January 2009 |
| 1 January 2009 | (England) Lee Butcher | Grays Athletic | 15 February 2009 |
| 16 January 2009 | (England) David Button | AFC Bournemouth | 16 February 2009 |
| 25 February 2009 | (England) Kyle Fraser-Allen | Macclesfield Town | 1 April 2009 |
| 6 March 2009 | (England) David Button | Luton Town | 7 April 2009 |
| 10 March 2009 | (England) Lee Butcher | St Albans City | 11 April 2009 |
| 13 March 2009 | (Morocco) Adel Taarabt | QPR | 24 April 2009 |
| 17 April 2009 | (England) David Button | Dagenham & Redbridge | 1 May 2009 |
| 20 January 2009 | (England) Troy Archibald-Henville | Exeter City | 4 May 2009 |
| 29 January 2009 | (France) Dorian Dervite | Southend United | 4 May 2009 |
| 3 March 2009 | (England) Danny Hutchins | Yeovil Town | 4 May 2009 |
| 12 March 2009 | (Wales) Chris Gunter | Nottingham Forest | 4 May 2009 |
| 13 March 2009 | (Mexico) Giovani dos Santos | Ipswich Town | 4 May 2009 |
| 19 March 2009 | (England) Jonathan Obika | Yeovil Town | 4 May 2009 |
| 19 March 2009 | (England) Andros Townsend | Yeovil Town | 4 May 2009 |
| 24 March 2009 | (England) Danny Rose | Watford | 4 May 2009 |
| 26 March 2009 | (Spain) Yuri Berchiche | Cheltenham Town | 4 May 2009 |
| 26 March 2009 | (Republic of Ireland) David Hutton | Cheltenham Town | 4 May 2009 |
| 18 April 2009 | (England) Lee Butcher | Grays Athletic | 4 May 2009 |
| 11 January 2009 | (Germany) Kevin-Prince Boateng | Borussia Dortmund | 24 May 2009 |
| 2 February 2009 | (Czech Republic) Tomáš Pekhart | Slavia Prague | January 2010 |

== Long-term injury list ==
| Date Injured | Player | Injury | Return Date |
|---|---|---|---|
| 8 November 2008 | (Mexico) Giovani dos Santos | Ankle Ligament | 2 January 2009 |
| 17 January 2009 | (England) Ledley King | Hamstring strain | 23 February 2009 |
| 20 November 2008 | (Scotland) Alan Hutton | Foot fracture | 23 March 2009 |
| 29 January 2009 | (England) Jermain Defoe | Broken metatarsal | 15 April 2009 |
| 19 April 2009 | (England) Michael Dawson | Torn ankle ligament | Start of 2009–10 season |
| 25 April 2009 | (England) Darren Bent | Medial ligament injury | 24 May 2009 |
| 26 April 2009 | (England) Jamie O'Hara | Knee Injury | Start of 2009–10 season |
| 18 May 2009 | (England) Tom Huddlestone | Knee Injury | Start of 2009–10 season |

== Pre-season and friendlies ==
| Date | Opponents | H / A | Result | Scorers | Attendance |
|---|---|---|---|---|---|
| 14 July 2008 | Tavernes | N | 0–8 | Lennon 27', Pekhart 47', 63', Dos Santos 53', 68', Malbranque 76', O'Hara 84', 85' | N/A |
| 19 July 2008 | CD Dénia | N | 2–4 | Taarabt 30', Jenas 38', Townsend 54', Bent 59', | N/A |
| 24 July 2008 | Hércules | A | 1–1 | Bent 34' | N/A |
| 28 July 2008 | Norwich City | A | 1–5 | Stefanović 10' (o.g), Bent 44', 57', 72', 75' | 25,243 |
| 30 July 2008 | Leyton Orient | A | 1–5 | Bent 45', 59', 76', Lennon 47', Modrić 51' | 9,250 |
| 1 August 2008 | Celtic | N | 0–2 | Bent 24, Bentley 79' | N/A |
| 3 August 2008 | Borussia Dortmund | N | 0–3 | Bent 9', Dos Santos 54, O'Hara 87' | N/A |
| 10 August 2008 | Roma | H | 5–0 | Bentley 2', 45', Bent 4', 53', Lennon 49' | 35,841 |

== Competitions ==
=== Overview ===
| Competition | First match | Last match | Starting round | Final position | Record | | | | | | | |
| Competition | First match | Last match | Starting round | Final position | Pld | W | D | L | GF | GA | GD | Win % |
|---|---|---|---|---|---|---|---|---|---|---|---|---|
| Premier League | 16 August 2008 | 24 May 2009 | Matchday 1 | 8th | 38 | 14 | 9 | 15 | 45 | 45 | +0 | 36.84 |
| FA Cup | 3 January 2009 | 24 January 2009 | Third round | Fourth round | 2 | 1 | 0 | 1 | 4 | 3 | +1 | 50.00 |
| Football League Cup | 23 September 2008 | 1 March 2009 | Third round | Runners-up | 6 | 4 | 1 | 1 | 14 | 8 | +6 | 66.67 |
| UEFA Cup | 18 September 2008 | 26 February 2009 | First round | Round of 32 | 8 | 3 | 3 | 2 | 11 | 9 | +2 | 37.50 |
| Total | | | | | 54 | 22 | 13 | 19 | 74 | 65 | +9 | 40.74 |

Last updated: 24 May 2009

=== Premier League ===
==== League table ====
| Pos | Team | Pld | W | D | L | GF | GA | GD | Pts | Qualification or relegation |
|---|---|---|---|---|---|---|---|---|---|---|
| 6 | Aston Villa | 38 | 17 | 11 | 10 | 54 | 48 | +6 | 62 | Qualification for the Europa League play-off round (Note: Since both finalists of the FA Cup (Chelsea and Everton) and the League Cup winners (Manchester United) qualified for the European competitions based on their league position, the sixth-placed team (Aston Villa) received a berth in the Europa League play-off round and the seventh-placed team (Fulham) received a berth in the Europa League third qualifying round.) |
| 7 | Fulham | 38 | 14 | 11 | 13 | 39 | 34 | +5 | 53 | Qualification for the Europa League third qualifying round |
| 8 | Tottenham Hotspur | 38 | 14 | 9 | 15 | 45 | 45 | 0 | 51 | |
| 9 | West Ham United | 38 | 14 | 9 | 15 | 42 | 45 | −3 | 51 | |
| 10 | Manchester City | 38 | 15 | 5 | 18 | 58 | 50 | +8 | 50 | |

Source: Barclays Premier League
Rules for classification: 1) points; 2) goal difference; 3) number of goals scored.

==== Results summary ====
| Overall | | | | | | | | Home | | | | | | Away | | | | | |
| Pld | W | D | L | GF | GA | GD | Pts | W | D | L | GF | GA | GD | W | D | L | GF | GA | GD |
|---|---|---|---|---|---|---|---|---|---|---|---|---|---|---|---|---|---|---|---|
| 38 | 14 | 9 | 15 | 45 | 45 | 0 | 51 | 10 | 5 | 4 | 21 | 10 | +11 | 4 | 4 | 11 | 24 | 35 | −11 |

Last updated: 24 May 2009.
Source: Results

==== Results by matchday ====
| Matchday | 1 | 2 | 3 | 4 | 5 | 6 | 7 | 8 | 9 | 10 | 11 | 12 | 13 | 14 | 15 | 16 | 17 | 18 | 19 | 20 | 21 | 22 | 23 | 24 | 25 | 26 | 27 | 28 | 29 | 30 | 31 | 32 | 33 | 34 | 35 | 36 | 37 | 38 |
|---|---|---|---|---|---|---|---|---|---|---|---|---|---|---|---|---|---|---|---|---|---|---|---|---|---|---|---|---|---|---|---|---|---|---|---|---|---|---|
| Ground | A | H | A | H | H | A | H | A | H | A | H | A | A | H | H | A | H | A | H | A | A | H | H | A | H | A | H | A | A | H | A | H | H | A | H | A | H | A |
| Result | L | L | D | L | D | L | L | L | W | D | W | W | L | W | L | W | D | L | D | L | L | D | W | L | D | W | W | D | W | W | L | W | W | L | W | D | W | L |
| Position | 14 | 17 | 19 | 20 | 20 | 20 | 20 | 20 | 20 | 20 | 20 | 16 | 19 | 16 | 16 | 15 | 15 | 16 | 16 | 16 | 19 | 17 | 15 | 16 | 17 | 14 | 13 | 12 | 11 | 11 | 11 | 9 | 9 | 10 | 10 | 8 | 8 | 8 |

Updated to match(es) played on 24 May 2009. Source:
A = Away; H = Home; W = Win; D = Draw; L = Loss; P = Postponed

==== Matches ====
| 16 August 2008 1 | Middlesbrough | 2–1 | Tottenham Hotspur | Middlesbrough |
| 15:00 BST | Wheater 71'; Mido 86'; Digard (yellow card) 90+2' | Report | Jenas (yellow card) 61'; Bentley (yellow card) 76'; Huth 90+3' (o.g.) | Stadium: Riverside Stadium; Attendance: 32,623; Referee: Martin Atkinson |

| 23 August 2008 2 | Tottenham Hotspur | 1–2 | Sunderland | Tottenham, London |
| 15:00 BST | Bale (yellow card) 26'; Jenas 73' | Report | Richardson (yellow card) 55'; Malbranque (yellow card) 58'; Cissé 82' | Stadium: White Hart Lane; Attendance: 36,064; Referee: Mike Dean |

| 31 August 2008 3 | Chelsea | 1–1 | Tottenham Hotspur | Fulham, London |
| 13:30 BST | Deco (yellow card) 10'; Belletti 27'; Cole (yellow card) 45'; Bosingwa (yellow card) 86' | Report | Bent 45+1' | Stadium: Stamford Bridge (stadium); Attendance: 41,790; Referee: Howard Webb |

| 15 September 2008 4 | Tottenham Hotspur | 1–2 | Aston Villa | Tottenham, London |
| 20:00 BST | Dawson (yellow card) 60'; Bent 87' | Report | Reo-Coker 5'; Shorey (yellow card) 21'; Carew (yellow card) 52'; Young 54' (yellow card) 90+3'; Agbonlahor (yellow card) 83' | Stadium: White Hart Lane; Attendance: 36,075; Referee: Steve Bennett |

| 21 September 2008 5 | Tottenham Hotspur | 0–0 | Wigan Athletic | Tottenham, London |
| 15:00 BST | Ćorluka (yellow card) 43'; O'Hara (yellow card) 51' | Report | Boyce (yellow card) 29'; Palacios (yellow card) 62' | Stadium: White Hart Lane; Attendance: 35,808; Referee: Steve Tanner |

| 28 September 2008 6 | Portsmouth | 2–0 | Tottenham Hotspur | Portsmouth |
| 13:30 BST | Defoe 34' (pen.); Diarra (yellow card) 38' (yellow-red card) 88'; Belhadj (yellow card) 57'; Crouch 68' (yellow card) 80'; Hughes (yellow card) 84' | Report | Woodgate (yellow card) 26'; O'Hara (yellow card) 32'; Lennon (yellow card) 90+5' | Stadium: Fratton Park; Attendance: 20,352; Referee: Mike Dean |

| 5 October 2008 7 | Tottenham Hotspur | 0–1 | Hull City | Tottenham, London |
| 15:00 BST | Jenas (yellow card) 34'; Lennon (yellow card) 73'; Bent (yellow card) 81'; Campbell (yellow card) 88' | Report | Geovanni 9'; Ashbee (yellow card) 21'; Boateng (yellow card) 38' | Stadium: White Hart Lane; Attendance: 36,062; Referee: Rob Styles |

| 19 October 2008 8 | Stoke City | 2–1 | Tottenham Hotspur | Stoke-on-Trent |
| 16:00 BST | Higginbotham 19' (pen.); Delap 53'; Faye (yellow card) 87' | Report | Bale (red card) 17'; Bent 25'; Hutton (yellow card) 64'; Woodgate (yellow card) 90'; Dawson (red card) 90+9' | Stadium: Britannia Stadium; Attendance: 27,500; Referee: Lee Mason |

| 26 October 2008 9 | Tottenham Hotspur | 2–0 | Bolton Wanderers | Tottenham, London |
| 15:00 BST | Pavlyuchenko 17'; Bent 76' (pen.) | Report | Nolan (yellow card) 37'; McCann (yellow card) 42' (yellow-red card) 56'; Jääskeläinen (yellow card) 75' | Stadium: White Hart Lane; Attendance: 35,507; Referee: Andre Marriner |

| 29 October 2008 10 | Arsenal | 4–4 | Tottenham Hotspur | Holloway, London |
| 20:00 GMT | Silvestre 37'; Gallas 46'; Adebayor 64'; van Persie 68'; Diaby (yellow card) 90+2' | Report | Bentley 13' (yellow card) 57'; Assou-Ekotto (yellow card) 54'; Huddlestone (yellow card) 59'; Bent 67'; Jenas (yellow card) 85' (goal) 89'; Lennon 90+4' | Stadium: Emirates Stadium; Attendance: 60,043; Referee: Martin Atkinson |

| 1 November 2008 11 | Tottenham Hotspur | 2–1 | Liverpool | Tottenham, London |
| 17:30 GMT | Carragher 69' (o.g.); King (yellow card) 79'; Pavlyuchenko 90+1' | Report | Kuyt 3'; Gerrard (yellow card) 45+1'; Carragher (yellow card) 67' | Stadium: White Hart Lane; Attendance: 36,183; Referee: Phil Dowd |

| 9 November 2008 12 | Manchester City | 1–2 | Tottenham Hotspur | Manchester |
| 15:00 GMT | Robinho 16'; Fernandes (yellow card) 18' (yellow-red card) 26'; Dunne (red card) 83' | Report | Bent 29', 64'; Assou-Ekotto (yellow card) 48' (yellow-red card) 89'; King (yellow card) 61' | Stadium: City of Manchester Stadium; Attendance: 41,893; Referee: Mike Dean |

| 15 November 2008 13 | Fulham | 2–1 | Tottenham Hotspur | Fulham, London |
| 15:00 GMT | Zamora (yellow card) 16'; Davies 33'; Johnson 70' | Report | Campbell 81' | Stadium: Craven Cottage; Attendance: 25,139; Referee: Alan Wiley |

| 23 November 2008 14 | Tottenham Hotspur | 1–0 | Blackburn Rovers | Tottenham, London |
| 13:30 GMT | Pavlyuchenko 9'; Bentley (yellow card) 45+2'; Jenas (yellow card) 89' | Report | Olsson (yellow card) 27' (yellow-red card) 39'; Ooijer (yellow card) 69'; Andrews (yellow card) 89' | Stadium: White Hart Lane; Attendance: 35,903; Referee: Alan Wiley |

| 30 November 2008 15 | Tottenham Hotspur | 0–1 | Everton | Tottenham, London |
| 15:00 GMT | Assou-Ekotto (yellow card) 33' | Report | Ćorluka 51' (o.g.); Pienaar (yellow card) 51'; Fellaini (yellow card) 64'; Cahill (yellow card) 77' | Stadium: White Hart Lane; Attendance: 35,742; Referee: Steve Bennett |

| 8 December 2008 16 | West Ham United | 0–2 | Tottenham Hotspur | Upton Park, London |
| 20:00 GMT | Behrami (yellow card) 78'; Noble (yellow card) 90+1' | Report | King 68'; O'Hara 89' | Stadium: Boleyn Ground; Attendance: 34,277; Referee: Chris Foy |

| 13 December 2008 17 | Tottenham Hotspur | 0–0 | Manchester United | Tottenham, London |
| 17:30 GMT | Huddlestone (yellow card) 56' | Report | Rafael (yellow card) 62' | Stadium: White Hart Lane; Attendance: 35,882; Referee: Mike Dean |

| 21 December 2008 18 | Newcastle United | 2–1 | Tottenham Hotspur | Newcastle upon Tyne |
| 15:00 GMT | N'Zogbia 11'; Enrique (yellow card) 11'; Gutiérrez (yellow card) 89'; Duff (yellow card) 90' | Report | Modrić 28' (yellow card) 88'; Huddlestone (yellow card) 62' | Stadium: St James' Park; Attendance: 47,982; Referee: Andre Marriner |

| 26 December 2008 19 | Tottenham Hotspur | 0–0 | Fulham | Tottenham, London |
| 13:00 GMT | | Report | Konchesky (yellow card) 79' | Stadium: White Hart Lane; Attendance: 35,869; Referee: Peter Walton |

| 28 December 2008 20 | West Bromwich Albion | 2–0 | Tottenham Hotspur | West Bromwich |
| 14:00 GMT | Morrison (yellow card) 28'; Brunt (yellow card) 45'; Zuiverloon (yellow card) 59'; Bednář 83'; Beattie 90+4' | Report | Dawson (yellow card) 13'; Assou-Ekotto (red card) 35'; Jenas (yellow card) 88' | Stadium: The Hawthorns; Attendance: 26,344; Referee: Steve Tanner |

| 11 January 2009 21 | Wigan Athletic | 1–0 | Tottenham Hotspur | Wigan |
| 13:30 GMT | Valencia (yellow card) 65'; Palacios (yellow card) 69'; Scharner (yellow card) 81'; Figueroa 90+1' | Report | Bale (yellow card) 33'; Zokora (yellow card) 72'; Woodgate (yellow card) 75' | Stadium: JJB Stadium; Attendance: 17,500; Referee: Andre Marriner |

| 18 January 2009 22 | Tottenham Hotspur | 1–1 | Portsmouth | Tottenham, London |
| 16:00 GMT | Defoe 70' | Report | Davis (yellow card) 27'; Nugent 59'; Kaboul (yellow card) 75' | Stadium: White Hart Lane; Attendance: 36,011; Referee: Steve Bennett |

| 27 January 2009 23 | Tottenham Hotspur | 3–1 | Stoke City | Tottenham, London |
| 20:00 GMT | Lennon 8'; Defoe 21'; Dawson 24'; Bentley (yellow card) 38'; Woodgate (yellow card) 51' | Report | Higginbotham (yellow card) 40'; Beattie 57'; Cresswell (yellow card) 63'; Whelan (yellow card) 69' | Stadium: White Hart Lane; Attendance: 36,072; Referee: Mike Riley |

| 31 January 2009 24 | Bolton Wanderers | 3–2 | Tottenham Hotspur | Horwich |
| 15:00 GMT | Puygrenier 31'; Davies 64', 87' | Report | Dawson (yellow card) 50'; Bent 72', 74' | Stadium: Reebok Stadium; Attendance: 21,575; Referee: Phil Dowd |

| 8 February 2009 25 | Tottenham Hotspur | 0–0 | Arsenal | Tottenham, London |
| 13:30 GMT | Modrić (yellow card) 37' | Report | Eboué (yellow card) 17' (yellow-red card) 37'; Clichy (yellow card) 43' | Stadium: White Hart Lane; Attendance: 36,021; Referee: Mike Dean |

| 23 February 2009 26 | Hull City | 1–2 | Tottenham Hotspur | Kingston upon Hull |
| 20:00 GMT | A. Dawson (yellow card) 7'; Turner 27'; Ashbee (yellow card) 42' | Report | Lennon 17'; Modrić (yellow card) 44'; Woodgate 85' | Stadium: KC Stadium; Attendance: 24,742; Referee: Lee Probert |

| 4 March 2009 27 | Tottenham Hotspur | 4–0 | Middlesbrough | Tottenham, London |
| 20:00 GMT | Keane 9'; Pavlyuchenko 14'; Lennon 40', 79' | Report | Pogatetz (yellow card) 29' | Stadium: White Hart Lane; Attendance: 35,761; Referee: Howard Webb |

| 7 March 2009 28 | Sunderland | 1–1 | Tottenham Hotspur | Sunderland |
| 15:00 GMT | Richardson 3' (yellow card) 34'; McCartney (yellow card) 36'; Bardsley (yellow card) 45+2' | Report | Ćorluka (yellow card) 22'; Woodgate (yellow card) 37'; Keane 89' | Stadium: Stadium of Light; Attendance: 37,894; Referee: Phil Dowd |

| 15 March 2009 29 | Aston Villa | 1–2 | Tottenham Hotspur | Birmingham |
| 16:00 GMT | Reo-Coker (yellow card) 54'; Carew 85' | Report | Jenas 5'; Zokora (yellow card) 23'; Bent 50'; Modrić (yellow card) 68'; Keane (yellow card) 70' | Stadium: Villa Park; Attendance: 41,205; Referee: Steve Bennett |

| 21 March 2009 30 | Tottenham Hotspur | 1–0 | Chelsea | Tottenham, London |
| 15:00 GMT | Modrić 50' (yellow card) 78'; Palacios (yellow card) 78' | Report | Belletti (yellow card) 45+2'; Ballack (yellow card) 84' | Stadium: White Hart Lane; Attendance: 36,034; Referee: Mike Dean |

| 4 April 2009 31 | Blackburn Rovers | 2–1 | Tottenham Hotspur | Blackburn |
| 12:45 BST | Samba (yellow card) 65'; McCarthy 82'; Ooijer 89' | Report | Keane 30' (pen.); Palacios (yellow card) 78' (yellow-red card) 80' | Stadium: Ewood Park; Attendance: 21,891; Referee: Peter Walton |

| 11 April 2009 32 | Tottenham Hotspur | 1–0 | West Ham United | Tottenham, London |
| 15:00 BST | Zokora (yellow card) 56'; Pavlyuchenko 65' | Report | Boa Morte (yellow card) 45+1'; Neill (yellow card) 57'; Di Michele (yellow card) 63'; Noble (yellow card) 90+1'; Collins (yellow card) 90+4' | Stadium: White Hart Lane; Attendance: 35,969; Referee: Martin Atkinson |

| 19 April 2009 33 | Tottenham Hotspur | 1–0 | Newcastle United | Tottenham, London |
| 13:30 BST | Bent 24'; Assou-Ekotto (yellow card) 77' | Report | Taylor (yellow card) 78' | Stadium: White Hart Lane; Attendance: 35,850; Referee: Mark Halsey |

| 25 April 2009 34 | Manchester United | 5–2 | Tottenham Hotspur | Old Trafford |
| 17:30 BST | Ronaldo 57' (pen.), 68' (yellow card) 69'; Tevez (yellow card) 58'; Rooney 67', 71'; Berbatov 79' | Report | Bent 29'; Modrić 32'; Woodgate (yellow card) 37'; Jenas (yellow card) 41'; Gomes (yellow card) 57' | Stadium: Old Trafford; Attendance: 75,458; Referee: Howard Webb |

| 2 May 2009 35 | Tottenham Hotspur | 1–0 | West Bromwich Albion | Tottenham, London |
| 15:00 BST | Jenas 43'; Palacios (yellow card) 76' | Report | Mulumbu (yellow card) 58' | Stadium: White Hart Lane; Attendance: 35,836; Referee: Rob Styles |

| 9 May 2009 36 | Everton | 0–0 | Tottenham Hotspur | Walton, Liverpool |
| 15:00 BST | Lescott (yellow card) 17'; Pienaar (yellow card) 18' | Report | Hutton (yellow card) 55'; Jenas (yellow card) 83'; Pavlyuchenko (yellow card) 90+1' | Stadium: Goodison Park; Attendance: 36,646; Referee: Lee Mason |

| 16 May 2009 37 | Tottenham Hotspur | 2–1 | Manchester City | Tottenham, London |
| 15:00 BST | Defoe 29'; Keane 86' (pen.) | Report | Zabaleta (yellow card) 42'; Bojinov 65' | Stadium: White Hart Lane; Attendance: 36,000; Referee: Mark Halsey |

| 24 May 2009 38 | Liverpool | 3–1 | Tottenham Hotspur | Anfield, Liverpool |
| 16:00 BST | Torres 31'; Hutton 64' (o.g.); Benayoun 81' | Report | Keane 77' | Stadium: Anfield; Attendance: 43,937; Referee: Peter Walton |

=== FA Cup ===
| 2 January 2009 Third round | Tottenham Hotspur | 3–1 | Wigan Athletic | Tottenham, London |
| 20:00 GMT | Pavlyuchenko 52' (pen.), 90+3'; Modrić 76' | Report | Palacios (yellow card) 49'; Kingson (yellow card) 52'; Camara 88' | Stadium: White Hart Lane; Attendance: 34,040; Referee: Alan Wiley |

| 24 January 2009 Fourth round | Manchester United | 2–1 | Tottenham Hotspur | Old Trafford |
| 17:15 GMT | Scholes 35'; Berbatov 36'; Vidić (yellow card) 60'; Tevez (yellow card) 90' | Report | Pavlyuchenko 5' | Stadium: Old Trafford; Attendance: 75,014; Referee: Alan Wiley |

=== Football League Cup ===
| 23 September 2008 Third round | Newcastle United | 1–2 | Tottenham Hotspur | Newcastle upon Tyne |
| 19:45 BST | Butt (yellow card) 22'; Owen 90' | Report | Ćorluka (yellow card) 35'; O'Hara (yellow card) 45' (goal) 66'; Pavlyuchenko 62'; Zokora (yellow card) 63' | Stadium: St James' Park; Attendance: 20,577; Referee: Alan Wiley |

| 12 November 2008 Fourth round | Tottenham Hotspur | 4–2 | Liverpool | Tottenham, London |
| 19:45 GMT | Pavlyuchenko 38', 52' (yellow card) 41'; Campbell 42', 45' (yellow card) 44' | Report | Plessis (yellow card) 10' (goal) 49'; Torres (yellow card) 35'; Babel (yellow card) 40'; Hyypiä 63' | Stadium: White Hart Lane; Attendance: 33,242; Referee: Mike Riley |

| 3 December 2008 Fifth round | Watford | 1–2 | Tottenham Hotspur | Watford |
| 19:45 GMT | McAnuff (yellow card) 9'; Priskin 13' (yellow card) 45' | Report | Pavlyuchenko 45' (pen.); Assou-Ekotto (yellow card) 67'; Bent 76' | Stadium: Vicarage Road; Attendance: 16,501; Referee: Phil Dowd |

| 6 January 2009 Semi-finals first leg | Tottenham Hotspur | 4–1 | Burnley | Tottenham, London |
| 20:00 GMT | Dawson 47'; O'Hara 52'; Pavlyuchenko 65'; Duff 68' (o.g.) | Report | Paterson 15'; Duff (yellow card) 84' | Stadium: White Hart Lane; Attendance: 31,377; Referee: Martin Atkinson |

| 21 January 2009 Semi-finals second leg | Burnley | 3–2 (a.e.t.) (4–6 agg.) | Tottenham Hotspur | Burnley |
| 19:45 GMT | Blake 34'; McCann (yellow card) 38' (goal) 73'; Duff (yellow card) 69'; Rodriguez 88' | Report | Bentley (yellow card) 21'; Pavlyuchenko 118'; Defoe 120' | Stadium: Turf Moor; Attendance: 19,533; Referee: Mark Halsey |

| 1 March 2009 Final | Manchester United | 0–0 (a.e.t.) (4–1 p) | Tottenham Hotspur | Wembley, London |
| 15:00 GMT | | Report | | Stadium: Wembley Stadium; Attendance: 88,217; Referee: Chris Foy |
| | Penalties |
| | Giggs (penalty scored); Tevez (penalty scored); Ronaldo (penalty scored); Anderson (penalty scored) | | (penalty missed) O'Hara; (penalty scored) Ćorluka; (penalty missed) Bentley |

=== UEFA Cup ===
==== First round ====
| 18 September 2008 First leg | Tottenham Hotspur (England) | 2–1 | (Poland) Wisła Kraków | London, England |
| 20:10 BST | Bentley 33'; Bent 73'; O'Hara (yellow card) 90' | Report | Jirsák 34'; Sobolewski (yellow card) 44'; Małecki (yellow card) 88' | Stadium: White Hart Lane; Attendance: 35,751; Referee: Lucílio Batista (Portugal) |

| 2 October 2008 Second leg | Wisła Kraków (Poland) | 1–1 (2–3 agg.) | (England) Tottenham Hotspur | Kraków, Poland |
| 14:40 CEST | Łobodziński (yellow card) 44'; Cléber (yellow card) 76'; Brożek 83' | Report | Woodgate (yellow card) 34'; Głowacki 58' (o.g.); Modrić (yellow card) 59'; Bale (yellow card) 62'; Zokora (yellow card) 76' | Stadium: Stadion Miejski im. Henryka Reymana; Attendance: 12,900; Referee: Alexandru Tudor (Romania) |

==== Group stage ====
| Pos | Team | Pld | W | D | L | GF | GA | GD | Pts | Qualification | UDI | TOT | NEC | SPA | DZ |
|---|---|---|---|---|---|---|---|---|---|---|---|---|---|---|---|
| 1 | (Italy) Udinese | 4 | 3 | 0 | 1 | 6 | 4 | +2 | 9 | Advance to knockout stage | — | 2–0 | — | — | 2–1 |
| 2 | (England) Tottenham Hotspur | 4 | 2 | 1 | 1 | 7 | 4 | +3 | 7 | Advance to knockout stage | — | — | — | 2–2 | 4–0 |
| 3 | (Netherlands) NEC | 4 | 2 | 0 | 2 | 6 | 5 | +1 | 6 | Advance to knockout stage | 2–0 | 0–1 | — | — | — |
| 4 | (Russia) Spartak Moscow | 4 | 1 | 1 | 2 | 5 | 6 | −1 | 4 | | 1–2 | — | 1–2 | — | — |
| 5 | (Croatia) Dinamo Zagreb | 4 | 1 | 0 | 3 | 4 | 9 | −5 | 3 | | — | — | 3–2 | 0–1 | — |

Source: RSSSF

| 23 October 2008 1 | Udinese (Italy) | 2–0 | (England) Tottenham Hotspur | Udine, Italy |
| 18:10 CEST | Luković (yellow card) 23'; Di Natale 24' (pen.); D'Agostino (yellow card) 75'; Isla (yellow card) 83'; Pepe 86' | Report | Gomes (yellow card) 23'; O'Hara (yellow card) 56' (yellow-red card) 57'; Bale (yellow card) 63' | Stadium: Stadio Friuli; Attendance: 22,000; Referee: Felix Brych (Germany) |

| 6 November 2008 2 | Tottenham Hotspur (England) | 4–0 | (Croatia) Dinamo Zagreb | London, England |
| 20:00 GMT | Bent 30', 33', 70'; Huddlestone 59' | Report | Lovren (yellow card) 45'; Hrgović (yellow card) 72' | Stadium: White Hart Lane; Attendance: 32,788; Referee: Fredy Fautrel (France) |

| 27 November 2008 3 | NEC (Netherlands) | 0–1 | (England) Tottenham Hotspur | Nijmegen, Netherlands |
| 18:00 CET | Davids (yellow card) 79' | Report | O'Hara 14' | Stadium: Goffertstadion; Attendance: 12,500; Referee: César Muñiz Fernández (Spain) |

| 18 December 2008 4 | Tottenham Hotspur (England) | 2–2 | (Russia) Spartak Moscow | London, England |
| 19:45 GMT | Modrić 67'; Huddlestone 74' | Report | Dzyuba 23', 33' | Stadium: White Hart Lane; Attendance: 28,906; Referee: Pedro Proença (Portugal) |

==== Knockout stage ====
===== Round of 32 =====
| 19 February 2009 First leg | Shakhtar Donetsk (Ukraine) | 2–0 | (England) Tottenham Hotspur | Donetsk, Ukraine |
| 19:45 EET | Raț (yellow card) 40'; Seleznyov 79'; Jádson 88' | Report | | Stadium: RSC Olimpiyskiy; Attendance: 25,000; Referee: Thomas Einwaller (Austria) |

| 26 February 2009 Second leg | Tottenham Hotspur (England) | 1–1 (1–3 agg.) | (Ukraine) Shakhtar Donetsk | London, England |
| 20:00 GMT | O'Hara (yellow card) 28'; dos Santos 55'; Palacios (yellow card) 90' | Report | Lewandowski (yellow card) 17'; Hübschman (yellow card) 50'; Fernandinho 86' | Stadium: RSC Olimpiyskiy; Attendance: 30,595; Referee: Paolo Tagliavento (Italy) |

== Manager statistics ==
| Manager | Games | Won | Drawn | Lost | H-Win% | A-Win% | Pos | Pts | PPLG | Lge Cup | FA Cup | UEFA Cup |
|---|---|---|---|---|---|---|---|---|---|---|---|---|
| (Spain) Juande Ramos (August 2008 – October 2008) | 12 | 2 (16.6%) | 3 (25%) | 7 (58.3%) | 20% | 14.2% | 20th | 2 | 0.25 | Fourth Round | Not Entered | Group Stage |
| (England) Harry Redknapp (October 2008 – Onwards) | 42 | 20 (47.6%) | 10 (23.8%) | 12 (28.5%) | 66.6% | 28.5% | 8th | 49 | 1.63 | Runners-Up | Fourth Round | Last 32 |
| (England) Tottenham Hotspur (August 2008 – May 2009) | 54 | 22 (40.7%) | 13 (24%) | 19 (35.1%) | 57.6% | 25% | 8th | 51 | 1.34 | Runners-Up | Fourth Round | Last 32 |

- Pts = League Points
- Pos = League Position
- H-Win% = Home Win%
- A-Win% = Away Win%
- PPLG = Points Per League Game
- Data includes all competitions

== Statistics ==
=== Appearances ===
Last updated: 26 July 2020.
Source: premierleague.com

| No. | Pos. | Name | Premier League | | FA Cup | | League Cup | | UEFA Cup | | Total | |
| No. | Pos. | Name | Apps | Goals | Apps | Goals | Apps | Goals | Apps | Goals | Apps | Goals |
Goalkeepers
| 1 | GK | (Brazil) Heurelho Gomes | 34 | 0 | 1 | 0 | 5 | 0 | 8 | 0 | 48 | 0 |
| 23 | GK | (Italy) Carlo Cudicini | 4 | 0 | 0 | 0 | 0 | 0 | 0 | 0 | 4 | 0 |
| 27 | GK | (England) Ben Alnwick | 0 | 0 | 1 | 0 | 1 | 0 | 0 | 0 | 2 | 0 |
Defenders
| 2 | DF | (Scotland) Alan Hutton | 5+3 | 0 | 0 | 0 | 1 | 0 | 2 | 0 | 8+3 | 0 |
| 3 | DF | (Wales) Gareth Bale | 12+4 | 0 | 2 | 0 | 3+2 | 0 | 7 | 0 | 24+6 | 0 |
| 16 | DF | (Wales) Chris Gunter | 2+1 | 0 | 1 | 0 | 1 | 0 | 6+1 | 0 | 10+2 | 0 |
| 20 | DF | (England) Michael Dawson | 13+3 | 1 | 2 | 0 | 5 | 1 | 3+1 | 0 | 23+4 | 2 |
| 21 | DF | (France) Pascal Chimbonda | 1+2 | 0 | 0 | 0 | 0 | 0 | 2 | 0 | 3+2 | 0 |
| 22 | DF | (Croatia) Vedran Corluka | 33+1 | 0 | 2 | 0 | 5 | 0 | 0 | 0 | 40+1 | 0 |
| 26 | DF | (England) Ledley King | 24 | 1 | 0 | 0 | 2 | 0 | 3 | 0 | 29 | 1 |
| 32 | DF | (Cameroon) Benoît Assou-Ekotto | 29 | 0 | 1 | 0 | 4 | 0 | 1+1 | 0 | 35+1 | 0 |
| 39 | DF | (England) Jonathan Woodgate | 34 | 1 | 1 | 0 | 4 | 0 | 5 | 0 | 44 | 1 |
Midfielders
| 4 | MF | (Ivory Coast) Didier Zokora | 23+5 | 0 | 2 | 0 | 6 | 0 | 7 | 0 | 38+5 | 0 |
| 5 | MF | (England) David Bentley | 20+5 | 1 | 2 | 0 | 2+1 | 0 | 5 | 1 | 29+6 | 2 |
| 6 | MF | (England) Tom Huddlestone | 14+8 | 0 | 1 | 0 | 2 | 0 | 5+1 | 2 | 22+9 | 2 |
| 7 | MF | (England) Aaron Lennon | 26+9 | 5 | 0+1 | 0 | 5 | 0 | 4+2 | 0 | 35+12 | 5 |
| 8 | MF | (England) Jermaine Jenas | 29+4 | 4 | 0 | 0 | 3 | 0 | 4 | 0 | 36+4 | 4 |
| 11 | MF | (Brazil) Gilberto | 1 | 0 | 0 | 0 | 0 | 0 | 2 | 0 | 3 | 0 |
| 12 | MF | (Honduras) Wilson Palacios | 11 | 0 | 0 | 0 | 0 | 0 | 1 | 0 | 12 | 0 |
| 14 | MF | (Croatia) Luka Modrić | 34 | 3 | 2 | 1 | 3+1 | 0 | 3+1 | 1 | 42+2 | 5 |
| 19 | MF | (Morocco) Adel Taarabt | 0+1 | 0 | 0+1 | 0 | 0+1 | 0 | 0 | 0 | 0+3 | 0 |
| 23 | MF | (Ghana) Kevin-Prince Boateng | 0+1 | 0 | 0 | 0 | 0+1 | 0 | 0 | 0 | 0+2 | 0 |
| 24 | MF | (England) Jamie O'Hara | 6+9 | 1 | 1 | 0 | 4+2 | 2 | 4+2 | 1 | 15+13 | 4 |
| 36 | MF | (England) Simon Dawkins | 0 | 0 | 0 | 0 | 0 | 0 | 1 | 0 | 1 | 0 |
| 51 | MF | (England) John Bostock | 0 | 0 | 0 | 0 | 0 | 0 | 0+3 | 0 | 0+3 | 0 |
| 52 | MF | (England) Dean Parrett | 0 | 0 | 0 | 0 | 0 | 0 | 1+1 | 0 | 1+1 | 0 |
| 77 | MF | (England) Ryan Mason | 0 | 0 | 0 | 0 | 0 | 0 | 0+1 | 0 | 0+1 | 0 |
Forwards
| 9 | FW | (Russia) Roman Pavlyuchenko | 19+9 | 5 | 2 | 3 | 5+1 | 6 | 0 | 0 | 26+10 | 14 |
| 10 | FW | (England) Darren Bent | 21+12 | 12 | 1 | 0 | 1+2 | 1 | 5+1 | 4 | 28+15 | 17 |
| 15 | FW | (Republic of Ireland) Robbie Keane | 14 | 5 | 0 | 0 | 0 | 0 | 0 | 0 | 14 | 5 |
| 17 | FW | (Mexico) Giovani dos Santos | 2+4 | 0 | 0+1 | 0 | 0+1 | 0 | 3+1 | 1 | 5+7 | 1 |
| 18 | FW | (England) Fraizer Campbell | 1+9 | 1 | 0+1 | 0 | 3+1 | 2 | 5+2 | 0 | 9+13 | 3 |
| 25 | FW | (England) Jermain Defoe | 6+2 | 3 | 0+1 | 0 | 1 | 1 | 0 | 0 | 7+3 | 4 |
| 80 | FW | (England) Jonathan Obika | 0 | 0 | 0 | 0 | 0 | 0 | 1+1 | 0 | 1+1 | 0 |
Players transferred out during the season
| 9 | FW | (Bulgaria) Dimitar Berbatov | 0+1 | 0 | 0 | 0 | 0 | 0 | 0 | 0 | 0+1 | 0 |
| 21 | GK | (Spain) César Sánchez | 0 | 0 | 0 | 0 | 0+1 | 0 | 0 | 0 | 0+1 | 0 |

=== Goal scorers ===
Last updated: 26 July 2020.
Source: premierleague.com

The list is sorted by shirt number when total goals are equal.

| Rnk | Pos | No. | Player | Premier League | FA Cup | League Cup | UEFA Cup | Total |
|---|---|---|---|---|---|---|---|---|
| 1 | FW | 10 | (England) Darren Bent | 12 | 0 | 1 | 4 | 17 |
| 2 | FW | 9 | (Russia) Roman Pavlyuchenko | 5 | 3 | 6 | 0 | 14 |
| 3 | MF | 7 | (England) Aaron Lennon | 5 | 0 | 0 | 0 | 5 |
| 3 | MF | 14 | (Croatia) Luka Modrić | 3 | 1 | 0 | 1 | 5 |
| 3 | FW | 15 | (Republic of Ireland) Robbie Keane | 5 | 0 | 0 | 0 | 5 |
| 6 | MF | 8 | (England) Jermaine Jenas | 4 | 0 | 0 | 0 | 4 |
| 6 | MF | 24 | (England) Jamie O'Hara | 1 | 0 | 2 | 1 | 4 |
| 6 | FW | 25 | (England) Jermain Defoe | 3 | 0 | 1 | 0 | 4 |
| 9 | FW | 18 | (England) Fraizer Campbell | 1 | 0 | 2 | 0 | 3 |
| 10 | MF | 5 | (England) David Bentley | 1 | 0 | 0 | 1 | 2 |
| 10 | MF | 6 | (England) Tom Huddlestone | 0 | 0 | 0 | 2 | 2 |
| 10 | DF | 20 | (England) Michael Dawson | 1 | 0 | 1 | 0 | 2 |
| 13 | FW | 17 | (Mexico) Giovani dos Santos | 0 | 0 | 0 | 1 | 1 |
| 13 | DF | 26 | (England) Ledley King | 1 | 0 | 0 | 0 | 1 |
| 13 | DF | 39 | (England) Jonathan Woodgate | 1 | 0 | 0 | 0 | 1 |
| TOTALS | | | | 43 | 4 | 13 | 10 | 70 |

=== Clean sheets ===
Last updated: 26 July 2020.
Source: premierleague.com

The list is sorted by shirt number when total clean sheets are equal.

| Rnk | No. | Player | Premier League | FA Cup | League Cup | UEFA Cup | Total |
|---|---|---|---|---|---|---|---|
| 1 | 1 | (Brazil) Heurelho Gomes | 12 | 0 | 1 | 2 | 15 |
| 2 | 21 | (Spain) César Sánchez | 0 | 0 | 1 | 0 | 1 |
| 2 | 23 | (Italy) Carlo Cudicini | 1 | 0 | 0 | 0 | 1 |
| TOTALS | | | 13 | 0 | 2 | 2 | 17 |
