= Benoît Assou-Ekotto =

Cameroon international footballer (born 1984)

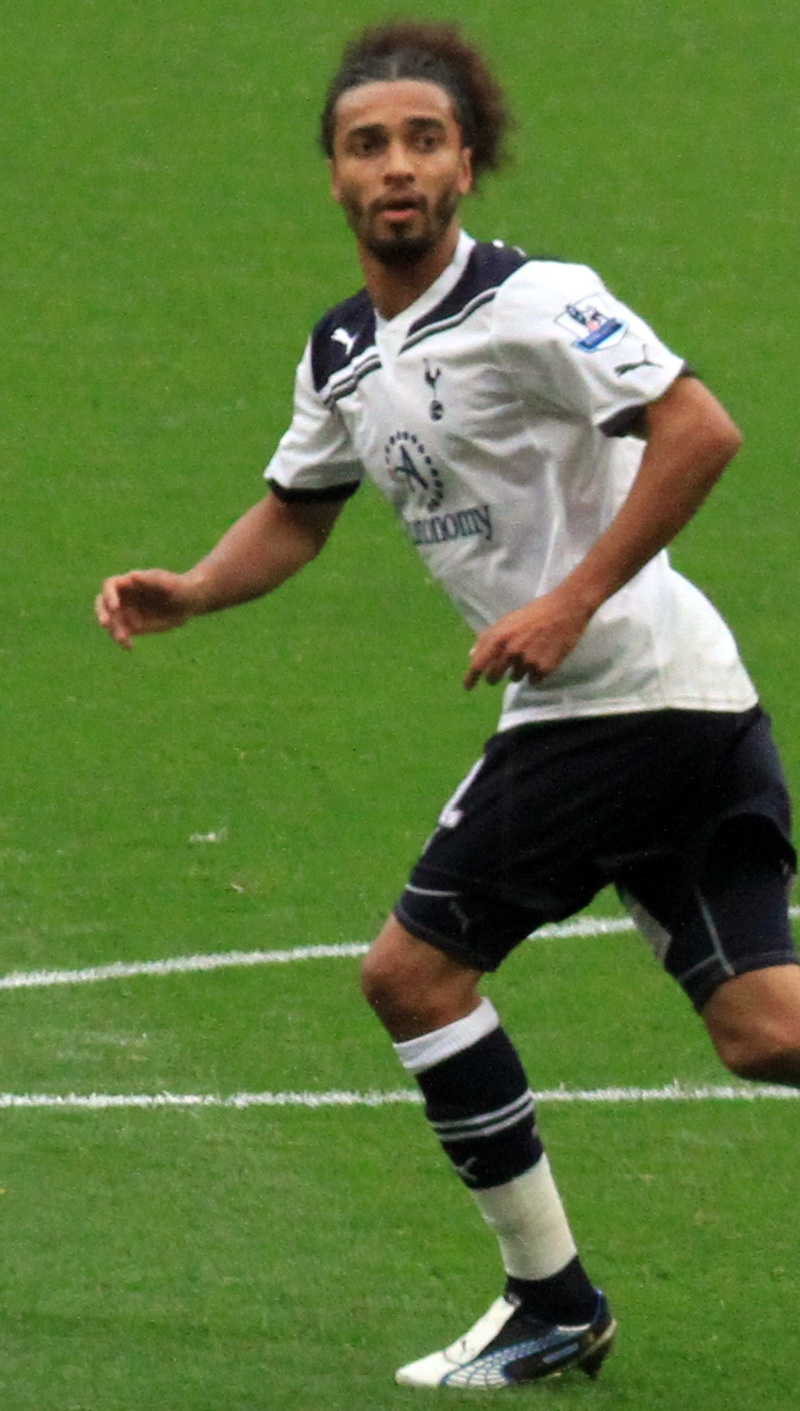
- Assou-Ekotto playing for Tottenham Hotspur in 2010

Personal information
- Full name: Benoît Pierre David Assou-Ekotto
- Date of birth: 24 March 1984 (age 42)
- Place of birth: Arras, France
- Height: 1.78 m (5 ft 10 in)
- Position: Left back

Youth career
- 1994–2004: Lens

Senior career*
Years	Team	Apps	(Gls)
2004–2006	Lens	67	(1)
2006–2015	Tottenham Hotspur	155	(4)
2013–2014	→ Queens Park Rangers (loan)	31	(0)
2015–2016	Saint-Étienne	20	(0)
2016–2018	Metz	31	(0)
Total		304	(5)

International career
2009–2014	Cameroon	23	(0)
- * Club domestic league appearances and goals

Benoît Pierre David Assou-Ekotto (born 24 March 1984) is a former professional footballer who played as a left back.

Assou-Ekotto came up through the youth ranks at Lens where he made his first-team debut in 2004. In 2006, he was signed by Tottenham Hotspur. He became a first-team regular for the Premier League club, totalling 200 appearances across all competitions. He was loaned to Queens Park Rangers in 2013 and released in 2015, after which he joined Saint-Étienne. The final club of his career was Ligue 1 club Metz.

He represented the Cameroon national team at the international level. He participated in two FIFA World Cup tournaments.

== Early life ==
Benoît Pierre David Assou-Ekotto was born on 24 March 1984 in Arras, Pas-de-Calais. He was born to a Cameroonian father and French mother. His father, David, was a professional footballer in France and introduced him to the sport.

== Club career ==
=== Lens ===
At the age of ten, Assou-Ekotto followed his brother in signing for Lens, before making his Ligue 1 debut on 28 March 2004 against Paris Saint-Germain, which Lens won the match 1–0. He played in 66 matches in Ligue 1 for Lens. He then played in seven of eight UEFA Cup matches as Lens fell to Udinese in the round of 32. After breaking into the first-team with three appearances in 2003–04, Assou-Ekotto caught the eye with 29 starts in 2004–05. At the start of the 2005–06 season, he played in all of Lens' matches in the UEFA Intertoto Cup, as they won that tournament and secured a place in that season's UEFA Cup. In the 2005–06 season, he was an almost ever-present for Lens in the league missing just four of 38 league matches as his team finished fourth and again qualified for the UEFA Cup. Assou-Ekotto's outstanding performances throughout the season led to him being praised as one of the best left-backs in the country.

=== Tottenham Hotspur ===
==== 2006–2009 ====
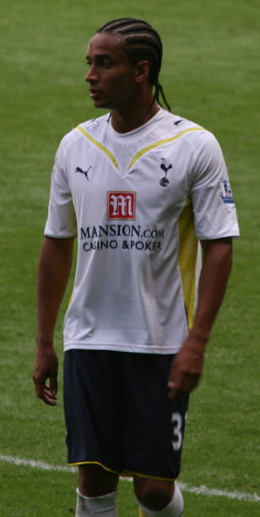
Assou-Ekotto playing for Tottenham Hotspur in 2009

In the summer of 2006, Assou-Ekotto moved to Tottenham Hotspur for an undisclosed fee, though estimated to be in the region of £3.5 million by the media. Manager Martin Jol and club sporting director Damien Comolli described him as one of the brightest prospects in French football at that time. Assou-Ekotto was expected to provide competition with South Korean Lee Young-pyo at the left-back position, but his performances in pre-season secured him a place in the starting line-up ahead of Lee. Assou-Ekotto made his full debut in a 2–0 defeat at Bolton Wanderers on the opening day of the 2006–07 Premier League season and looked to have unseated Lee until he picked up a knee injury in December. He then appeared to have lost his place to Lee and played just two matches throughout the entire 2007–08 season due to another injury.

When he first arrived in England, Assou-Ekotto spoke little English and he initially struggled at Tottenham. Assou-Ekotto has since argued that his injury changed his attitude to football because he realised that it could have ended his career:

When your surgeon tells you maybe you won't play football anymore many things are different in your mind. Before, when you're injured, your money comes into your account every month and everything is cool. But when they speak to you about the end of your career at 22 or 23… it's why maybe I changed. I'm safe now but this gave me a lesson. That's why I changed many things in my mind and in my life.

At the start of the 2008–09 season, Tottenham made their worst start to a campaign since 1912, losing six and drawing two of their opening eight Premier League matches. At that time, Assou-Ekotto's chances of first-team football were limited and he claimed that he wanted to leave England to go back to French football. However, Spurs manager Harry Redknapp decided to give Assou-Ekotto the chance to play in the team. He improved rapidly with regular matches and became first choice towards the end of the 2008–09 season. Having regained his fitness in the 2008–09 season, he became the North London club's first-choice left back due to a string of good performances under Redknapp. He started the 2009 League Cup final against Manchester United, where he played exceptionally well up against Cristiano Ronaldo. Even though Tottenham lost the match on penalties, Assou-Ekotto made left back his own position for the rest of the season as he made such a performance throughout the final. On 19 August 2009, he signed an extension to his contract keeping him at the club until June 2013. Manager Redknapp praised Assou-Ekotto, saying, "I think he has been injured before but I have been very impressed with him this season as he has been in great form. He has looked an outstanding left back."

==== 2009–2015 ====
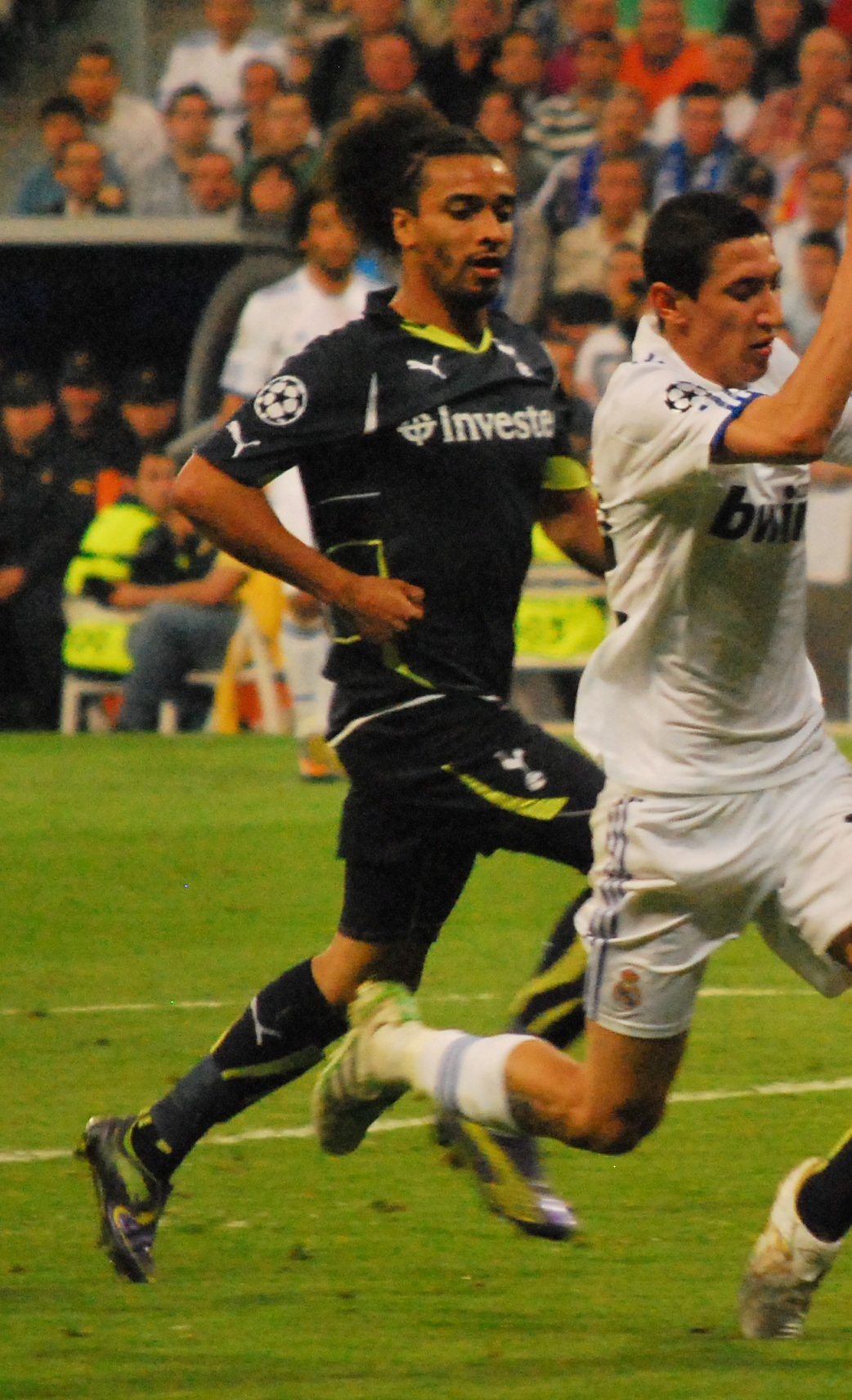
Assou-Ekotto (left) playing for Tottenham Hotspur in 2011

Assou-Ekotto scored his first career goal in a 2–1 win over Liverpool on the opening weekend of the 2009–10 Premier League season with a half-volley from 20 yards. He was rewarded for this fine form with a four-year contract extension on 19 August. During mid-season, he temporarily lost his place to youngster Gareth Bale but regained it when Redknapp moved Bale onto the left wing.

Assou-Ekotto started the 2012–13 season well with a career fifth goal from 25 yards out against West Bromwich Albion, but was sidelined after three league matches with a knee injury.

On 2 September 2013, Assou-Ekotto signed on a season-long loan with Queens Park Rangers, with QPR manager Harry Redknapp also signing Niko Kranjčar and Tom Carroll from his former team. Assou-Ekotto made his debut for the club 16 days later against Brighton & Hove Albion at Loftus Road, coming on as a first-half substitute to replace Nedum Onuoha in a goalless draw. He played 27 league matches and helped QPR return to the Premier League via the play-offs.

On 2 February 2015, having played no part in the season, he was released from his contract by the club.

=== Later career ===
On 1 July 2015, French Ligue 1 club Saint-Étienne signed Assou-Ekotto on a one-year contract. "Officially at St Étienne so happy – back in football," he wrote on Twitter after not having played for the entire 2014–15 season. During the course of the 2015–16 season Assou-Ekotto made 20 league appearances and 4 in the UEFA Europa League.

On 16 August 2016, newly promoted Ligue 1 club Metz signed Assou-Ekotto to a one-year contract after he served his one year with Saint-Étienne.

== International career ==
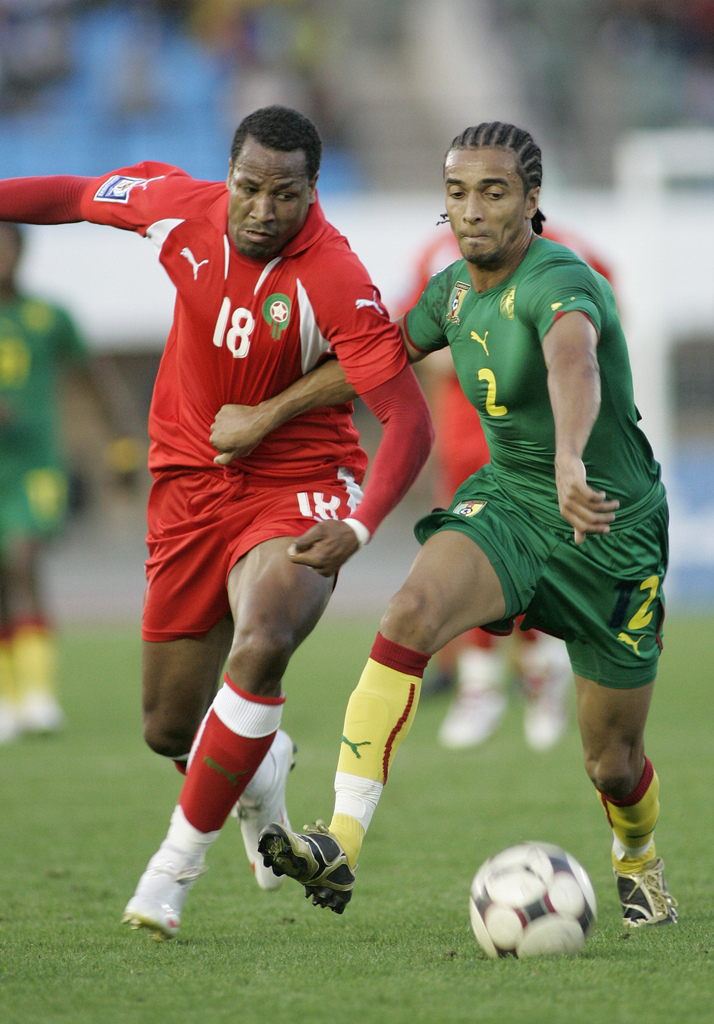
Assou-Ekotto (right) playing for Cameroon in 2009

Assou-Ekotto made his debut for Cameroon against Guinea in a friendly match on 11 February 2009. He also played the full 90 minutes in Cameroon's 1–0 surprise 2010 FIFA World Cup qualifying defeat to Togo on 28 March 2009. He was named in Cameroon's 2010 Africa Cup of Nations squad but was forced to withdraw prior to the tournament due to injury. Assou-Ekotto was also named in Paul Le Guen's final 23-man squad for the 2010 World Cup in South Africa and played every minute of Cameroon's three matches.

In an interview with the BBC in February 2011, Assou-Ekotto stated that he was encouraged to play for the France under-16 team as a teenager, but that "I told them I don't need to go because there is no point to wear the French shirt, I don't have feelings with French players". In an interview with The Guardian in May 2010, he stated:

Me playing for Cameroon was a natural and normal thing. I have no feeling for the France national team; it just doesn't exist. When people ask of my generation in France, 'Where are you from?', they will reply Morocco, Algeria, Cameroon or wherever. But what has amazed me in England is that when I ask the same question of people like Lennon and Defoe, they'll say: 'I'm English.' That's one of the things that I love about life here.

Assou-Ekotto took part in the 2014 World Cup, headbutting teammate Benjamin Moukandjo in his country's 4–0 loss to Croatia. He played no further part in the tournament.

== Personal life ==
Assou-Ekotto now lives in his hometown, Arras. He has two children.

=== Frankness ===
Assou-Ekotto is known for his forthright social commentary. In 2010, he sparked controversy with his criticism of the inconsistency between the public and private opinions of Premier League footballers, claiming that he was "always honest", though he added that he did not believe that the truth was always "good to say". In 2011, he drew further attention when he commented that football was "just a job", explaining that his primary motivation for playing the game professionally was the wage collected rather than intrinsic pleasure:

I have never bought into the hypocrisy of football but perhaps I'm more strident in my views now. I'm lucky and appreciate what I have, but football is just a job, a means to an end... there are more important things in life than kicking a ball around... Yes, I play for the money but then doesn't everybody who gets up in the morning and goes to work? They do it to provide for their family. It infuriates me when footballers go on about playing for the shirt. I think they should be held accountable for it when they kiss the badge and six months later clear off for a better pay day.

Assou-Ekotto maintained a similar philosophy when his Tottenham teammate Luka Modrić had an unsuccessful and controversial public transfer saga attempting to secure a move from Tottenham to city rivals Chelsea, asserting that a football player could be expected to transfer to a new club if his parent club failed to match other teams' higher wage offers.

=== Community involvement ===
Upon arriving at Tottenham, Assou-Ekotto pursued an interest in the local community and its inhabitants, expressing a "great sense of connection to Tottenham". He carried an Oyster card and frequented the London Underground, and often walked with Tottenham supporters towards White Hart Lane before home matches. During the 2011 London riots, he suggested in an interview with BBC Sport that his colleagues do more to mitigate geopolitical issues, such as donating one-hundredth of their salaries towards local causes. Assou-Ekotto himself made a "significant contribution" to the London Evening Standard's Dispossessed Fund. In his personal column for the same daily, he wrote at length on his experiences mingling with locals both during the riots and after with the Tottenham Hotspur Foundation:

During and just after the riots, I thought a lot about the challenges we face as a society. One thing I do think is just how separated we are even though technology has made the world smaller... I try to meet and talk with the residents [in Tottenham] as much as possible, hoping to better understand the challenges people face in their lives... Maybe growing up in a small town or coming from a small African nation makes me like the idea of community.

== Career statistics ==
=== Club ===
Appearances and goals by club, season and competition
Club	Season	League			National cup (Note: Includes Coupe de France, FA Cup)		League cup (Note: Includes Coupe de la Ligue, Football League Cup)		Europe		Total	
Club	Season	Division	Apps	Goals	Apps	Goals	Apps	Goals	Apps	Goals	Apps	Goals
Lens	2003–04	Ligue 1	3	0	0	0	0	0	0	0	3	0
Lens	2004–05	Ligue 1	29	1	0	0	0	0	0	0	29	1
Lens	2005–06	Ligue 1	35	0	0	0	0	0	7	0	42	0
Lens	Total		67	1	0	0	0	0	7	0	74	1
Tottenham Hotspur	2006–07	Premier League	16	0	1	0	3	0	5 (Note: Appearances in UEFA Cup)	0	25	0
Tottenham Hotspur	2007–08	Premier League	1	0	0	0	0	0	1	0	2	0
Tottenham Hotspur	2008–09	Premier League	29	0	1	0	4	0	2	0	36	0
Tottenham Hotspur	2009–10	Premier League	30	1	3	0	1	0	–		34	1
Tottenham Hotspur	2010–11	Premier League	30	0	2	0	1	0	12 (Note: Appearances in UEFA Champions League)	0	45	0
Tottenham Hotspur	2011–12	Premier League	34	2	0	0	1	0	3 (Note: Appearances in UEFA Europa League)	0	38	2
Tottenham Hotspur	2012–13	Premier League	15	1	2	0	0	0	5	0	22	1
Tottenham Hotspur	Total		155	4	9	0	10	0	28	0	202	4
Queens Park Rangers (loan)	2013–14	Championship	31	0	1	0	0	0	–		32	0
Saint-Étienne	2015–16	Ligue 1	20	0	0	0	0	0	7	0	27	0
Metz	2016–17	Ligue 1	18	0	1	0	2	0	–		21	0
Metz	2017–18	Ligue 1	13	0	0	0	0	0	–		13	0
Metz	Total		31	0	1	0	2	0	–		34	0
Career total			304	5	11	0	12	0	42	0	369	5

=== International ===
Appearances and goals by national team and year
National team	Year	Apps	Goals
Cameroon	2009	5	0
Cameroon	2010	9	0
Cameroon	2011	1	0
Cameroon	2013	3	0
Cameroon	2014	5	0
Total		23	0

== Honours ==
Lens

- UEFA Intertoto Cup: 2005

Tottenham Hotspur

- Football League Cup runner-up: 2008–09
