= Aaron Lennon =

English footballer (born 1987)

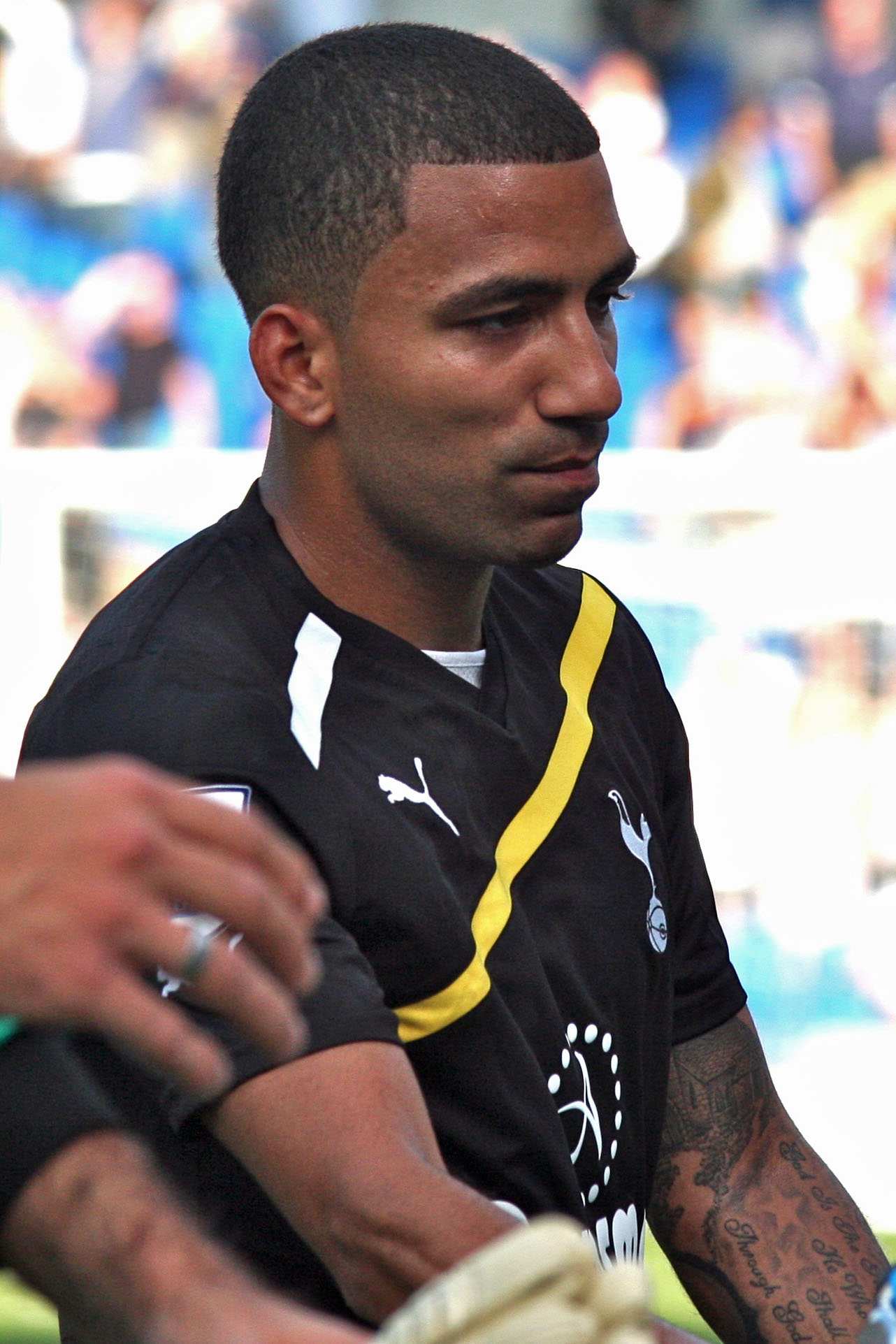
- Lennon playing for Tottenham Hotspur in 2011

Personal information
- Full name: Aaron Justin Lennon
- Date of birth: 16 April 1987 (age 39)
- Place of birth: Leeds, England
- Height: 5 ft 5 in (1.65 m)
- Positions: Right winger; right attacking midfielder

Youth career
- 2001–2003: Leeds United

Senior career*
Years	Team	Apps	(Gls)
2003–2005	Leeds United	38	(1)
2005–2015	Tottenham Hotspur	266	(26)
2015	→ Everton (loan)	14	(2)
2015–2018	Everton	51	(5)
2018–2020	Burnley	46	(1)
2020–2021	Kayserispor	36	(0)
2021–2022	Burnley	28	(2)
Total		479	(37)

International career
2003	England U17	1	(0)
2004–2006	England U19	15	(0)
2005–2008	England U21	5	(0)
2006–2007	England B	2	(0)
2006–2013	England	21	(0)
- * Club domestic league appearances and goals

Aaron Justin Lennon (/ˈɑːrən/; born 16 April 1987) is an English former professional footballer who played as a right winger.

Lennon began his career at hometown club Leeds United, making his first-team debut in 2003 and becoming the youngest player to play in the Premier League at that time. He moved to Tottenham Hotspur in 2005 for £1 million, where he made 364 appearances across all competitions and scored 30 goals. In 2008, Lennon won his first major honour, the League Cup, as Tottenham defeated London rivals Chelsea in the final.

He joined Everton in 2015 for £4.5 million, after his successful spell with the club on loan. He scored nine goals in 77 appearances for Everton before joining fellow Premier League club Burnley in 2018 on a two-and-a-half-year deal for an undisclosed fee. He made 55 appearances for the Lancashire club and scored one goal before departing on a free transfer to Kayserispor in Turkey in September 2020. He returned to Burnley in August 2021 at the expiry of his contract with Kayserispor.

Lennon made his senior debut for the England national team in 2006, and earned 21 caps over the next seven years. He was selected by England for the 2006 and 2010 FIFA World Cups.

== Early life ==
Born in Leeds, West Yorkshire, Lennon has a younger brother and a younger sister, and is of Irish and Jamaican heritage. He attended City of Leeds High School. He was first spotted by scouts when he was eight years old; his older brother Anthony played for Manchester United's youth team.

== Club career ==
=== Leeds United ===
In 2001, Lennon joined the Leeds United Academy. He set a record as the youngest player ever to have his boots sponsored when he signed up with Adidas at the age of just 14. Two years later, he began his professional career at Leeds United, where he became the youngest player to appear in the Premier League at the age of 16 years and 129 days, coming off the bench at White Hart Lane against Tottenham Hotspur in a 2–1 loss in August 2003.

Lennon scored his only goal for Leeds against Sunderland on 26 December 2004 during a 3–2 win. Lennon had been featuring from the bench up until that point, but he soon took his chance when John Oster was sacked for bad behaviour, becoming a regular starter from then on. His pace and skills on the wing excited Leeds fans, and he was one of the star performers in Leeds' first season in the Championship under the management of Kevin Blackwell with his performances earning rave reviews.

His last involvement at Leeds was playing and scoring in Lucas Radebe's testimonial. With Leeds' financial problems, Lennon was sold to Spurs for a heavily reduced fee, with a sell-on clause inserted into the deal.

=== Tottenham Hotspur ===
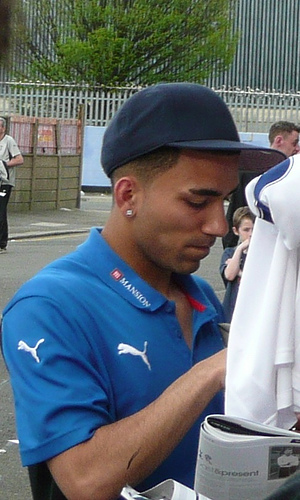
Lennon in 2008

With Leeds suffering financial difficulties, Lennon made a £1 million move to Tottenham Hotspur on 15 June 2005. His Spurs debut came a couple of months later in a 2–0 home defeat against Chelsea on 27 August 2005. On 18 March 2006, Lennon scored his first Premier League goal in Tottenham's 2–0 victory over Birmingham City at St Andrew's.

He was nominated by fellow players for the PFA Young Player of the Year for both the 2005–06 and 2006–07 seasons, but lost out to Wayne Rooney and Cristiano Ronaldo, respectively. Lennon signed a new five-and-a-half-year deal with Tottenham on 8 January 2007.

On 24 February 2008, Lennon won his first major career honour as Tottenham came from a goal down to defeat Chelsea 2–1 after extra time at Wembley Stadium in the 2008 League Cup Final.

An improved deal was signed in March 2009 which contracted him to Spurs until 2014. Lennon finished the 2008–09 season as the Tottenham Fans' Player of the Season, the club's Player of the Season and Young Player of the Season, and was nominated for a third successive year for PFA Young Player of the Year, this time losing out to Ashley Young. He played in 47 matches in all competitions and scored five goals, including a late equaliser in a memorable North London derby which ended 4–4 and was manager Harry Redknapp's first match in charge. Spurs finished eighth in the league and reached the 2009 League Cup Final, which they lost on penalties to Manchester United after a goalless draw at Wembley Stadium.

His goals early in the 2009–10 season – against West Ham United at the Boleyn Ground, and Birmingham City – kept Tottenham at the top of the league table with four successive wins, their best start to a league season since the 1960–61 season. On 24 October 2009, Lennon was injured in a match against Stoke City. Tottenham were consequently reduced to ten men as manager Harry Redknapp had used all three available substitutes and they would go on to lose the match 1–0. He returned on 22 November in a 9–1 victory against Wigan Athletic and provided three assists and scored one goal. He was substituted in the 79th minute for David Bentley, receiving a standing ovation from the fans at White Hart Lane.

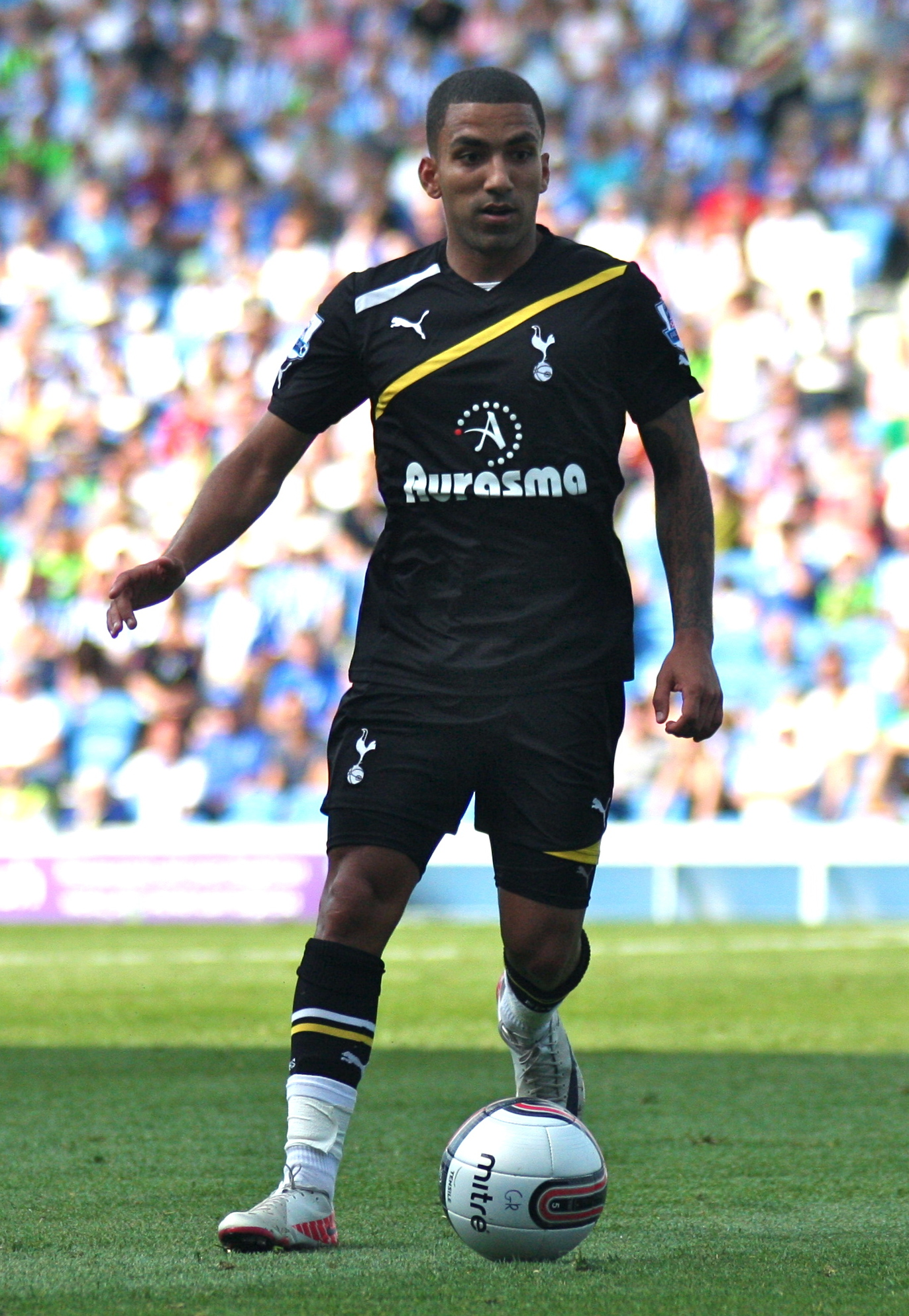
Lennon playing for Tottenham Hotspur in 2011

Lennon suffered a groin injury in December 2009 which kept him out of the team during the first months of 2010 and in the run up to the 2010 World Cup. He made his return from injury in a 3–1 defeat against Manchester United at Old Trafford on 24 April 2010, appearing as a second-half substitute.

On 28 November 2010, he scored a last minute winner in a 2–1 victory against Liverpool at White Hart Lane after a Benoît Assou-Ekotto long ball. On 15 February 2011, Lennon went on a blistering run as Tottenham counter-attacked and then delivered a perfect pass to assist Peter Crouch in a 1–0 win over A.C. Milan at the San Siro in the Round of 16 of the Champions League.

On 18 August 2011, Lennon scored in a 5–0 win against Hearts in a UEFA Europa League play-off tie. He scored his first league goal of the season against Fulham at Craven Cottage. In December, he scored his second goal of the season in a 3–0 win against Bolton at White Hart Lane. His next goal came on 11 January 2012 in a 2–0 home win against Everton.

On 1 September 2012, he signed a four-year deal keeping him at the club until 2016. Following that, he was named captain for the first time for a Europa League match against Lazio on 20 September 2012 which ended in a 0–0 draw. Lennon scored four goals during the 2012–13 season as Spurs finished in fifth place in the Premier League.

=== Everton ===
On 2 February 2015, Lennon was loaned to fellow Premier League club Everton for the remainder of the season. He made his debut for the club as a substitute in the Merseyside derby against Liverpool on 7 February. He scored his first goal for Everton in a 2–1 win against Queens Park Rangers at Loftus Road on 22 March 2015.

He returned to Spurs briefly, for the beginning of the 2015–16 season, but was sent to train with the Under-21 squad and was not given a squad number. On 1 September 2015, Lennon rejoined Everton permanently on a three-year deal for a reported fee of £4.5 million. He began 2016 in a rich vein of form, scoring in a 1–1 draw at home to former club Tottenham, and in three successive Everton wins in late January and early February. Lennon continued his scoring run in a 3–1 away win at Aston Villa and he also netted in a 3–2 home loss to West Ham United on 5 March. However, this form proved to be short-lived as results for the team worsened and a poor end to the season led to the sacking of manager Roberto Martínez.

The new season had a more frustrating feel as Lennon found himself well down the pecking order when new boss Ronald Koeman took charge of the club. Lennon had played just 14 minutes of football during the first two months of Everton's league campaign with his first league start coming on 19 November 2016 in a home match against Swansea City.

=== Burnley ===
On 23 January 2018, Lennon signed for Premier League club Burnley for an undisclosed fee on a two-and-a-half-year contract. His debut came on 31 January, coming on as a substitute in an away game against Newcastle United which ended in a 1–1 draw. Lennon did not get on the scoresheet until the following season when he scored his first and only goal for the club came in a September 2018 home game against AFC Bournemouth which finished 4–0. He left the club on the expiration of his contract in June 2020 having made a total of 55 appearances.

=== Kayserispor ===
Lennon joined Süper Lig club Kayserispor on 2 September 2020 on a free transfer.

=== Return to Burnley ===
Lennon re-joined Burnley on 25 August 2021 after the expiry of his Kayserispor contract. He made his second debut against Newcastle United in the EFL Cup the same day. Burnley announced on 10 June that Lennon would leave the club at the end of June when his contract expired.

Lennon announced his retirement from football on 15 November 2022.

== International career ==
Lennon was called up to the England U21 team for the first time in October 2005 and on 8 May 2006, he was picked in England's 2006 FIFA World Cup squad, despite being only 19 years of age and uncapped at senior level.

He was named man of the match in the England B encounter against Belarus on 25 May 2006 in England's World Cup warm-up match at the Madejski Stadium in Reading, which England B ultimately lost 2–1. He made his full England debut as a second-half substitute in the 6–0 win over Jamaica on 3 June.

Lennon appeared as a second-half substitute for England in their 2006 World Cup group stage match against Trinidad and Tobago (his first World Cup finals appearance). England scored twice following his and Wayne Rooney's arrival on the field, winning the match 2–0. Lennon then played in the quarter-final match against Portugal, coming on as a substitute for the injured David Beckham. Lennon was then himself substituted for Jamie Carragher immediately prior to a penalty shootout, in which England lost.

Lennon also came on as a substitute during a 5–0 Euro 2008 qualifying victory over Andorra on 2 September 2006 and made an instant impact by assisting Peter Crouch's second goal after receiving the ball for the first time. He made his first start for England in a Euro 2008 qualifier against Israel in March 2007 and was also selected in the first XI for the following match against Andorra. This proved to be Lennon's last appearance for exactly two years as he was selected again by England on 28 March 2009, starting in a friendly match with Slovakia at Wembley Stadium. Lennon started again for England when they played Ukraine on 1 April 2009 at Wembley Stadium.

He was called up for the friendly against Slovenia and the World Cup qualifier versus Croatia, following his fine form for Tottenham, and was named man of the match in the 5–1 win over Croatia.

Lennon was named in manager Fabio Capello's 23-man squad for the 2010 FIFA World Cup. At the tournament in South Africa, he started in England's opening two fixtures; the 1–1 draw against the United States and in the 0–0 draw with Algeria.

After a two-year absence, Lennon was recalled to the England squad for the 2014 FIFA World Cup qualifiers against San Marino and Poland in October 2012, appearing as an early substitute in the San Marino match and providing the cross for Danny Welbeck's first goal. He won his final cap in a friendly against Brazil in February 2013, missing the following month's World Cup qualifiers due to injury.

== Personal life ==
On 30 April 2017, Lennon was detained under the Mental Health Act 2007. He was taken to hospital "for assessment" after police were called to reports of danger to a man's life in Salford. Lennon was said to be "receiving care and treatment for a stress-related illness", Everton reported.

In March 2019, he spoke about the incident, and said that other players had asked him for advice.

== Career statistics ==
=== Club ===
Appearances and goals by club, season and competition
Club	Season	League			National cup		League cup		Europe		Total	
Club	Season	Division	Apps	Goals	Apps	Goals	Apps	Goals	Apps	Goals	Apps	Goals
Leeds United	2003–04	Premier League	11	0	1	0	2	0	—		14	0
Leeds United	2004–05	Championship	27	1	1	0	1	0	—		29	1
Leeds United	Total		38	1	2	0	3	0	—		43	1
Tottenham Hotspur	2005–06	Premier League	27	2	1	0	1	0	—		29	2
Tottenham Hotspur	2006–07	Premier League	26	3	6	1	3	0	8 (Note: Appearances in UEFA Cup)	1	43	5
Tottenham Hotspur	2007–08	Premier League	29	2	3	0	6	1	9	0	47	3
Tottenham Hotspur	2008–09	Premier League	35	5	1	0	5	0	6	0	47	5
Tottenham Hotspur	2009–10	Premier League	22	3	0	0	2	0	—		24	3
Tottenham Hotspur	2010–11	Premier League	34	3	1	0	1	0	10 (Note: Appearances in UEFA Champions League)	0	46	3
Tottenham Hotspur	2011–12	Premier League	23	3	5	0	0	0	4 (Note: Appearances in UEFA Europa League)	1	32	4
Tottenham Hotspur	2012–13	Premier League	34	4	1	0	0	0	11	0	46	4
Tottenham Hotspur	2013–14	Premier League	27	1	1	0	1	0	4	0	33	1
Tottenham Hotspur	2014–15	Premier League	9	0	0	0	2	0	6	0	17	0
Tottenham Hotspur	Total		266	26	19	1	21	1	58	2	364	30
Everton (loan)	2014–15	Premier League	14	2	—		—		—		14	2
Everton	2015–16	Premier League	25	5	5	1	1	0	—		31	6
Everton	2016–17	Premier League	11	0	0	0	2	1	—		13	1
Everton	2017–18	Premier League	15	0	0	0	2	0	2	0	19	0
Everton	Total		65	7	5	1	5	1	2	0	77	9
Burnley	2017–18	Premier League	14	0	—		—		—		14	0
Burnley	2018–19	Premier League	16	1	0	0	0	0	6	0	22	1
Burnley	2019–20	Premier League	16	0	2	0	1	0	—		19	0
Burnley	Total		46	1	2	0	1	0	6	0	55	1
Kayserispor	2020–21	Süper Lig	36	0	0	0	—		—		36	0
Burnley	2021–22	Premier League	28	2	1	0	3	0	—		32	2
Career total			479	37	29	2	33	2	66	2	607	43

=== International ===
Appearances and goals by national team and year
National team	Year	Apps	Goals
England	2006	7	0
England	2007	2	0
England	2008	0	0
England	2009	6	0
England	2010	4	0
England	2011	0	0
England	2012	1	0
England	2013	1	0
Total		21	0

== Honours ==
Tottenham Hotspur

- Football League Cup: 2007–08; runner-up: 2008–09
