= Dag Alexander Olsen =

Norwegian footballer (born 1989)

Personal information
- Full name: Dag Alexander Olsen
- Date of birth: 9 September 1989 (age 37)
- Place of birth: Oslo, Norway
- Height: 1.76 m (5 ft 9 in)
- Positions: Forward; winger

Team information
- Current team: Gjøvik-Lyn
- Number: 10

Youth career
- 2006: Gjøvik-Lyn
- 2006–2008: Tottenham

Senior career*
Years	Team	Apps	(Gls)
2008–2012	Valencia B	29	(7)
2012	Odd	6	(1)
2013	Castellón	7	(3)
2014–2015	Fredrikstad	45	(8)
2016–	Gjøvik-Lyn	147	(20)
- * Club domestic league appearances and goals as of 6 December 2023

Dag Alexander Olsen (born 9 September 1989) is a Norwegian professional footballer who plays as a forward or winger for Gjøvik-Lyn.

== Club career ==
After finishing his graduation in Tottenham Hotspur's youth setup, Olsen signed with Valencia CF. He made his senior debuts with the reserves in the 2008–09 season, in Segunda División B. Olsen also appeared three times with the main team, starting in a 1–1 away draw against Al Ain FC and scoring twice vs Standard Liege.

After being sparingly used in his third season, Olsen left the Valencians and signed with Odd Grenland BK. On 2 September he made his debut, coming on as a late substitute in a 1–0 away win over FK Haugesund.

On 29 October 2013, Olsen returned to Spain, signing with CD Castellón until 23 December, to get back to fitness after a crucial ligament rupture in Norway. In March the following year he moved teams and countries again, signing a one-year deal with Fredrikstad FK. Ahead of the 2016 season he returned home to Gjøvik and FK Gjøvik-Lyn.

== Career statistics ==
As of 7 August 2015

Appearances and goals by club, season and competition
Club	Season	Division	League		Cup		Total	
Club	Season	Division	Apps	Goals	Apps	Goals	Apps	Goals
Valencia B	2008–09	Segunda División B	7	1	–		7	1
Valencia B	2009–10	Segunda División B	20	6	–		20	6
Valencia B	2011–12	Segunda División B	2	0	–		2	0
Valencia B	Total		29	7	0	0	29	7
Odd	2012	Tippeligaen	6	1	0	0	6	1
Castellón	2013–14	Tercera División	7	3	0	0	7	3
Fredrikstad	2014	1. divisjon	29	8	1	0	30	8
Fredrikstad	2015	OBOS-ligaen	16	0	2	0	18	0
Fredrikstad	Total		45	8	3	0	48	8
Career total			87	19	3	0	90	19
