= Mirko Ranieri =

Italian footballer

Personal information
- Date of birth: 8 February 1992 (age 34)
- Place of birth: Assisi, Italy
- Height: 1.88 m (6 ft 2 in)
- Position: Goalkeeper

Youth career
- Perugia

Senior career*
Years	Team	Apps	(Gls)
2007–2008	Perugia	0	(0)
2008–2012	Tottenham Hotspur	0	(0)
2009–2010	→ Ipswich (loan)	0	(0)
2011	→ Basingstoke Town (loan)	2	(0)
2011–2012	→ Viareggio (loan)	18	(0)

International career
2008	Italy U16	4	(0)
2008	Italy U17	5	(0)
- * Club domestic league appearances and goals as of 23 November 2014

Mirko Ranieri (born 8 February 1992) is an Italian former professional footballer who played as a goalkeeper. He is now a product manager at Google.

== Club career ==
=== Perugia ===
Born Assisi, Italy, Ranieri was brought up in Perugia where at school he won medals in football, athletics and chess. He began his career with Perugia, making 18 appearances for Perugia's under-18s, plus 12 games for the first team in friendlies.

=== Tottenham Hotspur ===
On 30 June 2008, English Premier League club Tottenham Hotspur announced they had signed Ranieri following his appearances for Italy at Under-16 level and he would join up the Academy group of players. Spurs' sporting director Damien Comolli described Ranieri as 6 ft 2in and an excellent shot-stopper. His distribution and decision-making is improving all the time. He is a highly-intelligent individual and another very good young goalkeeper we have attracted to the club'.

==== Loan to Ipswich Town ====
On 9 November 2009, English Championship side Ipswich announced that Ranieri would join on loan until the end of the season as cover for regular youth goalkeeper Ian McLoughlin who was unavailable to play in the FA Youth Cup because of age restrictions for that competition, unfortunately Ranieri suffered a broken leg that ended his season early.

==== Loan to Basingstoke Town ====
On 18 February 2011, English Conference South side Basingstoke Town signed Ranieri on a one-month loan, during which time he made 2 appearances.

==== Loan to Viareggio ====
On 8 August 2011, Italian third division club Viareggio signed Ranieri on loan until the end of the season. Ranieri made a promising start to his time at Viareggio, establishing himself as the club's first choice goalkeeper.

=== International career ===
Ranieri played once in 2009 UEFA European Under-17 Football Championship qualification.
