= Lee Butcher =

English footballer

Personal information
- Full name: Lee Anthony Butcher
- Date of birth: 11 October 1988 (age 38)
- Place of birth: Waltham Forest, England
- Height: 6 ft 1 in (1.85 m)
- Position: Goalkeeper

Youth career
- 199?–199?: Norwich City
- 199?–2007: Arsenal
- 2007–2008: Tottenham Hotspur

Senior career*
Years	Team	Apps	(Gls)
2008–2010	Tottenham Hotspur	0	(0)
2008	→ AFC Wimbledon (loan)	5	(0)
2008	→ Margate (loan)	4	(0)
2008–2009	→ Grays Athletic (loan)	0	(0)
2009	→ St Albans City (loan)	6	(0)
2009	→ Grays Athletic (loan)	3	(0)
2009	→ Grays Athletic (loan)	5	(0)
2009	→ Leyton Orient (loan)	0	(0)
2010–2013	Leyton Orient	32	(0)
2013–2016	Welling United	42	(0)
2016–2017	Tilbury	34	(0)
Total		131	(0)
- * Club domestic league appearances and goals

Lee Anthony Butcher (born 11 October 1988) is an English former professional footballer who last played for Tilbury as a goalkeeper. He started his career as a youth player at Norwich City and Arsenal, before moving to Tottenham Hotspur following his release in 2007. After loan spells with a number of non-League clubs, he joined League One club Leyton Orient on loan on 14 October 2009, and signed for Orient on a permanent basis in May 2010.

== Career ==
=== Early career ===
Born in Waltham Forest, Butcher grew up in Chingford. He started his youth career with Norwich City as a schoolboy before joining Arsenal at the age of 10, and aged 15 he was voted the Goalkeeper of the Tournament at the Cannes Football Festival of 2004. He was released from Arsenal in May 2007 and had trials with Leeds United and Wycombe Wanderers. After playing a number of pre-season friendlies for Tottenham Hotspur reserves and under-18s he eventually signed for the club.

=== Club career ===
During the 2007–08 season, Butcher made 11 appearances for the Tottenham Hotspur reserve team. In January 2008, he was loaned out to Isthmian League Premier Division club AFC Wimbledon, making his debut against Maidstone United in their 2–1 win on 5 January. He went on to make a total of seven appearances in all competitions. In September 2008, Butcher joined Margate on loan where he made four appearances during September and October. He then joined Grays Athletic in late December 2008, but did not make an appearance for the first team. St Albans City signed Butcher on loan in March 2009, where he made six appearances in the Conference South. Butcher rejoined Grays toward the end of the 2008–09 season, and made his debut in the Conference National for Grays on 18 April in the 2–0 defeat at Altrincham. Butcher made three appearances for Grays before returning to Tottenham at the end of the season.

In July 2009, Butcher signed another one-year contract with Tottenham. He then re-joined Grays Athletic, during the following 2009–10 season, on a one-month loan deal on 1 September, where he made a further five appearances in the Conference National. On 14 October, he signed on loan for League One club Leyton Orient as cover for Glenn Morris after Jamie Jones suffered an injury. Butcher returned to Tottenham on 17 November, having not made a first-team appearance for Leyton Orient.

After the end of the 2009–10 season, he signed for Leyton Orient on a one-year contract following his release from Tottenham in May 2010. He made his League debut as a substitute in the 1–1 draw at Oldham Athletic on 2 October, after Jones again suffered an injury. After making ten appearances in all competitions, he lost his place when Jason Brown was brought in on loan in late November. He remained on the bench until 25 April 2011, when a further Jones injury brought him back into the first team for the trip to Carlisle United. Butcher saved a penalty in the eighth minute, and Orient won 1–0. He returned to the first team at the beginning of the 2011–12 season due to another Jones injury, and saved two penalties in Orient's 4–3 penalty shoot-out victory over Southend United on 9 August. After establishing himself in the first team in Jones' absence, Butcher suffered an anterior cruciate ligament injury in an awkward fall in the 3–1 defeat at home to Scunthorpe United on 18 February 2012, missing the remainder of the season. He never returned to the first team through further injury, and after 38 appearances in all competitions, he was released by Orient on 30 April 2013.

Butcher joined Conference National side Welling United in August 2013 to provide cover for the injured Sam Mott. He later joined Tilbury, making 43 appearances in all competitions, but left in order to concentrate on his main job, working on the London Underground.
