= 2008–09 Football League Cup =

Carling Cup, League Cup
- The logo of the League Cup from 2003–04 to 2008–09

Tournament details
- Country: England; Wales
- Teams: 92

Final positions
- Champions: Manchester United (3rd title)
- Runners-up: Tottenham Hotspur

Tournament statistics
- Matches played: 93
- Goals scored: 290 (3.12 per match)
- Top goal scorer(s): Nathan Ellington; Roman Pavlyuchenko; Carlos Tevez (6 goals)

The 2008–09 Football League Cup (known as the Carling Cup for sponsorship reasons) was the 49th season of the Football League Cup, a knock-out competition for the top 92 football clubs played in English football league system. The winners qualified for the third qualifying round of the 2009–10 UEFA Europa League, if not already qualified for European competitions.

Manchester United won the competition by defeating holders Tottenham Hotspur on penalties in the final on 1 March 2009.

== First round ==
The draw for the first round took place on 13 June 2008, with matches being played two months later in the week beginning 11 August 2008.

The 72 Football League clubs competed from the first round, which was divided into North and South sections. Each section was divided equally into a pot of seeded clubs and a pot of unseeded clubs. Clubs' rankings depend upon their finishing position in the 2007–08 season.

North
Tie no	Home team	Score^{1}	Away team	Attendance
1	Preston North End	2–0	Chesterfield	5,150
2	Chester City	2–5	Leeds United	3,644
3	Leicester City	1–0	Stockport County	7,386
4	Sheffield United	3–1	Port Vale	7,694
5	Grimsby Town	2–0	Tranmere Rovers	1,858
6	Crewe Alexandra	2–0	Barnsley	2,492
7	Hartlepool United	3–0	Scunthorpe United	2,076
8	Derby County	1–1	Lincoln City	10,091
Derby County won 3 – 1 after extra time
9	Notts County	0–0	Doncaster Rovers	3,272
Notts County won 1 – 0 after extra time
10	Sheffield Wednesday	1–1	Rotherham United	16,298
2 – 2 after extra time – Rotherham United won 5 – 3 on penalties
11	Shrewsbury Town	0–1	Carlisle United	3,337
12	Wolverhampton Wanderers	1–1	Accrington Stanley	9,424
Wolverhampton Wanderers won 3 – 2 after extra time
13	Bury	0–2	Burnley	4,276
14	Rochdale	0–0	Oldham Athletic	5,786
0 – 0 after extra time – Oldham Athletic won 4 – 1 on penalties
15	Nottingham Forest	4–0	Morecambe	4,030
16	Huddersfield Town	4–0	Bradford City	8,932
17	Macclesfield Town	2–0	Blackpool	1,631
18	Walsall	1–2	Darlington	2,702

South
Tie no	Home team	Score^{1}	Away team	Attendance
1	Coventry City	3–1	Aldershot Town	9,293
2	Milton Keynes Dons	1–0	Norwich City	6,261
3	Wycombe Wanderers	0–4	Birmingham City	2,735
4	Brighton & Hove Albion	4–0	Barnet	2,571
5	Gillingham	0–1	Colchester United	2,566
6	Southend United	0–0	Cheltenham Town	2,998
Cheltenham Town won 1 – 0 after extra time
7	Swansea City	2–0	Brentford	5,366
8	Luton Town	2–0	Plymouth Argyle	2,682
9	Exeter City	1–3	Southampton	6,471
10	Watford	1–0	Bristol Rovers	5,574
11	Bournemouth	1–2	Cardiff City	3,399
12	Bristol City	2–1	Peterborough United	5,684
13	Charlton Athletic	0–1	Yeovil Town	6,239
14	Millwall	0–1	Northampton Town	3,525
15	Swindon Town	2–3	Queens Park Rangers	7,230
16	Crystal Palace	2–1	Hereford United	3,094
17	Dagenham & Redbridge	1–2	Reading	2,360
18	Ipswich Town	4–1	Leyton Orient	10,477

^{1} Score after 90 minutes

== Second round ==
Twelve Premier League teams – including the eleven that were not involved in European competitions – entered at this stage, along with the winners from the first round. The draw for the second round took place on 13 August 2008, and the matches were played in the week beginning 25 August 2008, with the exception of Manchester City's game against Brighton & Hove Albion, which was played on 24 September.

Tie no	Home team	Score^{1}	Away team	Attendance
1	Ipswich Town	2 – 1	Colchester United	17,084
2	Coventry City	2 – 2	Newcastle United	19,249
Newcastle United won 3 – 2 after extra time
3	Hartlepool United	1 – 1	West Bromwich Albion	3,387
Hartlepool United won 3 – 1 after extra time
4	West Ham United	1 – 1	Macclesfield Town	10,055
West Ham United won 4 – 1 after extra time
5	Huddersfield Town	1 – 2	Sheffield United	15,189
6	Cardiff City	2 – 1	Milton Keynes Dons	6,334
7	Swansea City	1 – 1	Hull City	8,622
Swansea City won 2 – 1 after extra time
8	Rotherham United	0 – 0	Wolverhampton Wanderers	5,404
0 – 0 after extra time – Rotherham United won 4 – 3 on penalties
9	Brighton & Hove Albion	1 – 1	Manchester City	8,729
2 – 2 after extra time – Brighton & Hove Albion won 5 – 3 on penalties
10	Reading	5 – 1	Luton Town	7,498
11	Blackburn Rovers	4 – 1	Grimsby Town	8,379
12	Wigan Athletic	4 – 0	Notts County	4,100
13	Leeds United	4 – 0	Crystal Palace	10,765
14	Crewe Alexandra	2 – 1	Bristol City	3,227
15	Middlesbrough	5 – 1	Yeovil Town	15,651
16	Fulham	3 – 2	Leicester City	7,584
17	Queens Park Rangers	4 – 0	Carlisle United	8,021
18	Nottingham Forest	1 – 1	Sunderland	9,198
Sunderland won 2 – 1 after extra time
19	Burnley	3 – 0	Oldham Athletic	5,528
20	Southampton	2 – 0	Birmingham City	11,331
21	Bolton Wanderers	1 – 2	Northampton Town	7,136
22	Watford	1 – 1	Darlington	5,236
Watford won 2 – 1 after extra time
23	Preston North End	0 – 1	Derby County	8,037
24	Cheltenham Town	2 – 3	Stoke City	3,600

^{1} Score after 90 minutes

== Third round ==
Eight teams involved in European competition entered at this stage along with the winners from the second round. Since nine English teams qualified for European competition in 2008, it was initially unclear precisely which eight teams would automatically enter the third round. Either Aston Villa, who had entered into European competition via the UEFA Intertoto Cup, or Manchester City, who qualified for the UEFA Cup via the UEFA Fair Play ranking would enter in the third round with the other entering in the second round instead. On 29 July 2008, it was announced that Aston Villa would enter the 2008–09 Carling Cup at the third round stage after reaching the second qualifying round of the UEFA Cup.

The draw for the third round was held on 30 August 2008, and the matches were played on Tuesday, 23 September and Wednesday, 24 September 2008, with the exception of the match between Brighton & Hove Albion and Derby County, which was played on 4 November.

Tie no	Home team	Score^{1}	Away team	Attendance
1	Arsenal	6 – 0	Sheffield United	56,632
2	Brighton & Hove Albion	1 – 4	Derby County	6,625
3	Burnley	1 – 0	Fulham	7,119
4	Portsmouth	0 – 4	Chelsea	15,339
5	Blackburn Rovers	1 – 0	Everton	14,366
6	Rotherham United	3 – 1	Southampton	5,147
7	Swansea City	1 – 0	Cardiff City	17,411
8	Ipswich Town	1 – 4	Wigan Athletic	13,803
9	Stoke City	2 – 2	Reading	9,141
2 – 2 after extra time – Stoke City won 4 – 3 on penalties
10	Leeds United	3 – 2	Hartlepool United	14,599
11	Watford	1 – 0	West Ham United	12,914
12	Manchester United	3 – 1	Middlesbrough	53,729
13	Liverpool	2 – 1	Crewe Alexandra	28,591
14	Aston Villa	0 – 1	Queens Park Rangers	21,541
15	Sunderland	2 – 2	Northampton Town	21,082
2 – 2 after extra time – Sunderland won 4 – 3 on penalties
16	Newcastle United	1 – 2	Tottenham Hotspur	20,577

^{1} Score after 90 minutes

== Fourth round ==
The fourth round draw took place on Saturday, 27 September, and the matches were played in the week commencing 10 November 2008.

Tie no	Home team	Score^{1}	Away team	Attendance
1	Sunderland	1 – 2	Blackburn Rovers	18,555
2	Arsenal	3 – 0	Wigan Athletic	59,665
3	Chelsea	1 – 1	Burnley	41,369
1 – 1 after extra time – Burnley won 5 – 4 on penalties
4	Swansea City	0 – 1	Watford	9,549
5	Manchester United	1 – 0	Queens Park Rangers	62,539
6	Stoke City	2 – 0	Rotherham United	15,458
7	Derby County	2 – 1	Leeds United	18,540
8	Tottenham Hotspur	4 – 2	Liverpool	33,242

^{1} Score after 90 minutes

== Fifth round ==
The fifth round draw took place on Saturday, 15 November and the matches were played week in the commencing 1 December 2008.

2 December 2008
19:45

Burnley	2–0	Arsenal
McDonald 6', 57'	Report

Turf Moor, Burnley
Attendance: 19,405
Referee: Andre Marriner (Birmingham)
2 December 2008
19:45

Stoke City	0–1	Derby County
	Report	Ellington 90+4' (pen.)

Britannia Stadium, Stoke-on-Trent
Attendance: 22,034
Referee: Rob Styles (Hampshire)
3 December 2008
19:45

Watford	1–2	Tottenham Hotspur
Priskin 13'	Report	Pavlyuchenko 45+2' (pen.); Bent 76'

Vicarage Road, Watford
Attendance: 16,501
Referee: Phil Dowd (Staffordshire)
3 December 2008
20:00

Manchester United	5–3	Blackburn Rovers
Tevez 35', 50' (pen.), 54', 90+4'; Nani 40'	Report	McCarthy 48', 90+2'; Derbyshire 84'

Old Trafford, Manchester
Attendance: 53,997
Referee: Alan Wiley (Staffordshire)

== Semi-finals ==
The semi-final draw took place on Saturday, 6 December 2008. The first leg matches were played on Tuesday, 6 January 2009 and Wednesday, 7 January 2009, while the second legs were played on Tuesday, 20 January 2009 and Wednesday, 21 January 2009.

=== First leg ===
6 January 2009
20:00

Tottenham Hotspur	4–1	Burnley
Dawson 46'; O'Hara 52'; Pavlyuchenko 65'; Duff 68' (o.g.)	Report	Paterson 15'

White Hart Lane, London
Attendance: 31,377
Referee: Martin Atkinson (West Yorkshire)
7 January 2009
19:45

Derby County	1–0	Manchester United
Commons 30'	Report

Pride Park, Derby
Attendance: 30,194
Referee: Phil Dowd (Staffordshire)

=== Second leg ===
20 January 2009
20:00

Manchester United	4–2	Derby County
Nani 16'; O'Shea 22'; Tevez 34'; Ronaldo 87' (pen.)	Report	Barnes 79' (pen.), 90+1'

Old Trafford, Manchester
Attendance: 73,374
Referee: Mike Dean (Cheshire)

Manchester United won 4–3 on aggregate.

21 January 2009
19:45

Burnley	3–2 (a.e.t.)	Tottenham Hotspur
Blake 33'; McCann 73'; Rodriguez 88'	Report	Pavlyuchenko 118'; Defoe 120'

Turf Moor, Burnley
Attendance: 19,533
Referee: Mark Halsey (Lancashire)

Tottenham Hotspur won 6–4 on aggregate.

== Final ==
The final was played at Wembley Stadium, London, on Sunday, 1 March 2009.

1 March 2009
15:00 GMT

Manchester United	0–0 (a.e.t.)	Tottenham Hotspur
	Report
Penalties
Giggs (penalty scored); Tevez (penalty scored); Ronaldo (penalty scored); Anderson (penalty scored)	4–1	(penalty missed) O'Hara; (penalty scored) Ćorluka; (penalty missed) Bentley

Wembley Stadium, London
Attendance: 88,217
Referee: Chris Foy (Merseyside)

== Top scorers ==
The top scorers in the 2008–09 Football League Cup are as follows:

Rank	Scorer	Club	Goals
1	(England) Nathan Ellington	Derby County	6
1	(Russia) Roman Pavlyuchenko	Tottenham Hotspur	6
1	(Argentina) Carlos Tevez	Manchester United	6
4	(Northern Ireland) Martin Paterson	Burnley	5
5	(Jamaica) Jermaine Beckford	Leeds United	4
5	(Russia) James Henry	Reading	4
5	(Mexico) Carlos Vela	Arsenal	4
5	(Argentina) Emmanuel Villa	Derby County	4
9	(Senegal) Henri Camara	Wigan Athletic	3
9	(Russia) Matt Derbyshire	Blackburn Rovers	3
9	(Wales) Robert Earnshaw	Nottingham Forest	3
9	(Argentina) Emmanuel Ledesma	Queens Park Rangers	3
9	(Portugal) Nani	Manchester United	3
9	(Australia) Joel Porter	Hartlepool United	3
