= 2002–03 Wolverhampton Wanderers F.C. season =

English football club season

Wolverhampton Wanderers
2002–03 season
- Chairman: Sir Jack Hayward OBE
- Manager: Dave Jones
- Football League First Division: 5th (promoted via play-offs)
- FA Cup: Quarter-finals
- League Cup: 2nd round
- Top goalscorer: League: Kenny Miller (19); All: Kenny Miller (24)
- Highest home attendance: 28,190 (vs Leicester City, 4 May 2003)
- Lowest home attendance: 23,016 (vs Brighton, 11 November 2002)
- Average home league attendance: 25,745 (league only)

The 2002–03 season was the 104th season of competitive league football in the history of English football club Wolverhampton Wanderers. They played the season in the second tier of the English football system, the Football League First Division.

The season was a huge success for the club as they were promoted to the Premier League via the play-offs after finishing fifth in the table. It was their first and only success in the play-off system from, to date, six attempts. This ended a nineteen-year top flight absence for the club and a fourteen-year stay in the same division.

== Season review ==
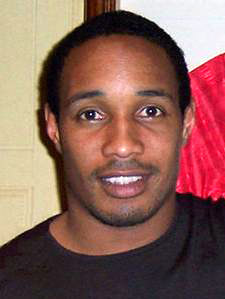
Paul Ince was Wolves' high-profile summer signing.

In contrast to the heavy spending of the previous close season, Summer 2002 saw the club recruit four players on free transfers. Two of these incoming players were however high-profile deals, with former England captain Paul Ince signing alongside ex-Manchester United stalwart Denis Irwin, on one-year deals.

The season began strongly with an opening day draw at administration-hit Bradford City, followed by three successive victories that put the club at the top of the table. Their form soon dipped though, and the next seven games brought just one win. An upturn saw a 10-game unbeaten run return the team to the play-off positions, aided by the loan addition of striker Carlton Cole. The Christmas/New Year period though brought a return of just two points from a possible 15.

With this drop in form, manager Dave Jones faced criticism from chairman Sir Jack Hayward at the turn of the year, publicly reminding him that he had promised to deliver automatic promotion. With the club lying 10th in the league, some 16 points from the top two, the FA Cup provided a welcome distraction as they eliminated Premier League opposition, Newcastle United, in the Third Round.

The following week brought a first league success in six games, with a narrow victory at neighbours Walsall further relieving the pressure on manager Jones. A 4–1 cup triumph against promotion chasers Leicester City preceded the team's highest away win of the campaign, where they defeated Sheffield Wednesday 4–0 to return to the play-off zone. However, their following away fixture brought the team crashing back to ground with a 1–4 loss at relegation strugglers Brighton.

An unbeaten sequence yielded 14 points from 18 before a slender loss at runaway leaders Portsmouth. March also saw an exit from the FA Cup, losing 0–2 at Premier League Southampton in Wolves' first quarter final appearance for five years, before the club recorded their biggest win since 1988 as they thumped Gillingham 6–0.

By April Wolves sat in sixth place, the final play-off berth, but with the East Anglian duo of Ipswich and Norwich just two points behind. Easter Monday brought the decisive round of games to clarify the play-off picture with Ipswich losing earlier in the day, meaning Wolves could confirm their play-off place if they won at Norwich. A 3–0 victory that evening ensured the club would participate in its fourth play-off campaign at this level.

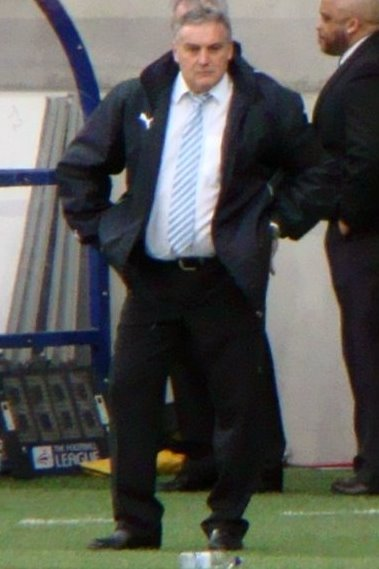
Dave Jones became the first Wolves manager to return the club to the top flight in 19 years.

Wolves finished the season in fifth place after two successive draws, meaning they would play Reading in the play-offs. The first leg saw them at home, where they overturned a half time deficit to win the game 2–1 and take a lead into the second leg. A tense 1–0 success at the Madejski Stadium thanks to a goal from substitute Alex Rae sent them into the final for the first time, breaking a run of three successive losses in away legs.

The final was staged at the Millennium Stadium in Cardiff where Wolves met Sheffield United. The Blades had had a strong season, being positioned in the play-off zone almost throughout and reaching the semi-finals of both the FA Cup and League Cup. Wolves won the game decisively with three first-half goals by Mark Kennedy, Nathan Blake and top goalscorer Kenny Miller bringing a 3–0 triumph, preserved by goalkeeper Matt Murray who saved a second half penalty from Michael Brown as part of a man of the match performance.

Promotion ended a 19-year absence from the top level of English football for the club and a fourteen-year stay in the same division. It also brought owner Sir Jack Hayward his dream of Premier League football at his 13th attempt. Three days later Hayward joined in a bus parade through Wolverhampton city centre to Molineux to celebrate the triumph.

== Results ==
=== Preseason ===
Wolves' pre season saw them spend a week in Cascais, Portugal (15–22 July), training and playing two Portuguese sides. As had become common in recent years, only their final game was held at their Molineux home.

13 July 2002	Kettering Town	0–1	Wolverhampton Wanderers	Kettering
15:00 BST		Report	Newton 57'	Stadium: Rockingham Road; Attendance: 988

13 July 2002	Morecambe	3–3	Wolverhampton Wanderers	Morecambe
15:00 BST	Black 57'; Bentley 59', 72'	Report	Cameron 9'; Sturridge 30'; Jones 87'	Stadium: Christie Park; Referee: Lee Mason

18 July 2002	Sporting CP	5–1	Wolverhampton Wanderers	Alcochete, Portugal
18:30 BST	Luís Filipe 5'; Pollet 58' (o.g.); Niculae 68' (pen.); Rui Bento 71'; Toñito 83'	Report	Newton 78'	Stadium: Academia Sporting; Attendance: 400; Referee: Bruno Paixão

21 July 2002	Marítimo	1–0	Wolverhampton Wanderers	Rio Maior, Portugal
19:00 BST	Quim 50'	Report		Stadium: Municipal Sports Complex; Referee: Olegário Benquerença

27 July 2002	Stockport County	0–0	Wolverhampton Wanderers	Stockport
15:00 BST		Report		Stadium: Edgeley Park; Referee: George Cain

31 July 2002	Cardiff City	0–1	Wolverhampton Wanderers	Cardiff
19:45 BST		Report	Proudlock 84'	Stadium: Ninian Park; Attendance: 8,064; Referee: Paul Thomas

3 August 2002	Wolverhampton Wanderers	0–2	Newcastle United	Wolverhampton
15:00 BST		Report	LuaLua 6', 68'	Stadium: Molineux; Attendance: 14,973; Referee: Frazer Stretton

A second string Wolves side also played: 2–0 v Kidderminster Harriers (24 July), 4–0 v Worcester City (1 August) and 0–0 v Burton Albion (6 August)

=== Football League First Division ===
A total of 24 teams competed in the Football League First Division in the 2002–03 season. Each team played every other team twice: once at their stadium, and once at the opposition's. Three points were awarded to teams for each win, one point per draw, and none for defeats.

The provisional fixture list was released on 13 June 2002, but was subject to change in the event of matches being selected for television coverage or police concerns.

11 August 2002 1	Bradford City	0–0	Wolverhampton Wanderers	Bradford
16:30 BST		Report		Stadium: Bradford & Bingley Stadium; Attendance: 13,223 (1,763 away fans); Referee: Colin Webster

14 August 2002 2	Wolverhampton Wanderers	3–1	Walsall	Wolverhampton
19:45 BST	Cameron 11', 55'; Newton 86'	Report	Herivelto 68'	Stadium: Molineux; Attendance: 27,904 (2,982 away fans); Referee: Mike Jones

17 August 2002 3	Wolverhampton Wanderers	3–0	Burnley	Wolverhampton
15:00 BST	Blake 2'; Irwin 49'; Cooper 88'	Report		Stadium: Molineux; Attendance: 25,031 (1,259 away fans); Referee: Jeff Winter

24 August 2002 4	Derby County	1–4	Wolverhampton Wanderers	Derby
15:00 BST	Christie 45'	Report	Rae 19', 88'; Cooper 77'; Miller 90+2'	Stadium: Pride Park; Attendance: 29,954 (3,500 away fans); Referee: Alan Kaye

27 August 2002 5	Wolverhampton Wanderers	2–2	Sheffield Wednesday	Wolverhampton
19:45 BST	Blake 60'; Sturridge 68'	Report	Kuqi 9', 63'	Stadium: Molineux; Attendance: 27,096 (997 away fans); Referee: Mike Pike

31 August 2002 6	Wimbledon	3–2	Wolverhampton Wanderers	London
15:00 BST	Shipperley 4', 77'; Gray 54'	Report	Ingimarsson 15'; Sturridge 70'	Stadium: Selhurst Park; Attendance: 3,223 (1,800 away fans); Referee: Brian Curson

14 September 2002 7	Crystal Palace	4–2	Wolverhampton Wanderers	London
15:00 BST	Routledge 1'; Freedman 36', 62' (pen.); Thomson 71'	Report	Ingimarsson 31'; Blake 71'	Stadium: Selhurst Park; Attendance: 16,961 (1,820 away fans); Referee: Lee Cable

21 September 2002 8	Wolverhampton Wanderers	0–1	Reading	Wolverhampton
15:00 BST		Report	Hughes 58'	Stadium: Molineux; Attendance: 25,560 (1,721 away fans); Referee: Michael Ryan

24 September 2002 9	Wolverhampton Wanderers	4–0	Preston North End	Wolverhampton
19:45 BST	Blake 23', 85'; Sturridge 45'; Miller 86'	Report		Stadium: Molineux; Attendance: 23,695 (663 away fans); Referee: Richard Beeby

28 September 2002 10	Leicester City	1–0	Wolverhampton Wanderers	Leicester
15:00 BST	Dickov 6' (pen.)	Report		Stadium: Walkers Stadium; Attendance: 32,082 (3,300 away fans); Referee: Mike Riley

5 October 2002 11	Wolverhampton Wanderers	1–3	Sheffield United	Wolverhampton
15:00 BST	Ullathorne 35' (o.g.)	Report	Tonge 45+5', 50'; Allison 48'	Stadium: Molineux; Attendance: 24,625 (1,500 away fans); Referee: Paul Taylor

19 October 2002 12	Stoke City	0–2	Wolverhampton Wanderers	Stoke-on-Trent
17:35 BST		Report	Cameron 78'; Blake 90+3'	Stadium: Britannia Stadium; Attendance: 16,885 (2,007 away fans); Referee: Mark Halsey

26 October 2002 13	Wolverhampton Wanderers	4–1	Grimsby Town	Wolverhampton
15:00 BST	Irwin 30'; Miller 66'; Ndah 71'; Sturridge 90+4'	Report	Kabba 2'	Stadium: Molineux; Attendance: 23,875 (891 away fans); Referee: Frazer Stretton

29 October 2002 14	Gillingham	0–4	Wolverhampton Wanderers	Gillingham
19:45 GMT		Report	Cameron 28' (pen.); Blake 45+2', 52', 59'	Stadium: Priestfield; Attendance: 10,036 (1,600 away fans); Referee: Matt Messias

2 November 2002 15	Watford	1–1	Wolverhampton Wanderers	Watford
15:00 GMT	Cox 66'	Report	Cooper 90+2'	Stadium: Vicarage Road; Attendance: 16,524 (1,433 away fans); Referee: Paul Armstrong

6 November 2002 16	Wolverhampton Wanderers	1–1	Portsmouth	Wolverhampton
19:45 GMT	Sturridge 62'	Report	Merson 56'	Stadium: Molineux; Attendance: 27,022 (2,380 away fans); Referee: Graham Salisbury

11 November 2002 17	Wolverhampton Wanderers	1–1	Brighton & Hove Albion	Wolverhampton
19:45 GMT	Miller 76'	Report	Zamora 15'	Stadium: Molineux; Attendance: 23,016 (943 away fans); Referee: Steve Baines

16 November 2002 18	Coventry City	0–2	Wolverhampton Wanderers	Coventry
15:00 GMT		Report	Lescott 38'; Rae 77'	Stadium: Highfield Road; Attendance: 18,998 (2,683 away fans); Referee: Graham Laws

23 November 2002 19	Wolverhampton Wanderers	2–1	Nottingham Forest	Wolverhampton
15:00 GMT	Miller 76'; Sturridge 80'	Report	Harewood 45+3'	Stadium: Molineux; Attendance: 27,953 (2,623 away fans); Referee: Dermot Gallagher

30 November 2002 20	Rotherham United	0–0	Wolverhampton Wanderers	Rotherham
17:35 GMT		Report		Stadium: Millmoor; Attendance: 6,736 (1,935 away fans); Referee: Paul Robinson

7 December 2002 21	Wolverhampton Wanderers	1–0	Norwich City	Wolverhampton
15:00 GMT	Cole 37'	Report		Stadium: Molineux; Attendance: 25,753 (1,708 away fans); Referee: Andy D'Urso

14 December 2002 22	Wolverhampton Wanderers	0–2	Coventry City	Wolverhampton
15:00 GMT		Report	McAllister 8'; Partridge 65'	Stadium: Molineux; Attendance: 25,577 (1,688 away fans); Referee: Howard Webb

21 December 2002 23	Millwall	1–1	Wolverhampton Wanderers	London
15:00 GMT	Roberts 43'	Report	Kennedy 5'	Stadium: The New Den; Attendance: 9,091 (0 away fans); Referee: Clive Penton

26 December 2002 24	Burnley	2–1	Wolverhampton Wanderers	Burnley
15:00 GMT	Taylor 24'; West 32'	Report	Butler 85'	Stadium: Turf Moor; Attendance: 18,641 (1,535 away fans); Referee: Matt Messias

28 December 2002 25	Wolverhampton Wanderers	1–2	Bradford City	Wolverhampton
15:00 GMT	Ndah 54'	Report	Jørgensen 51'; Gray 59'	Stadium: Molineux; Attendance: 25,812 (930 away fans); Referee: Anthony Bates

1 January 2003 26	Wolverhampton Wanderers	1–1	Derby County	Wolverhampton
15:00 GMT	Ince 66'	Report	Christie 15'	Stadium: Molineux; Attendance: 26,442 (2,190 away fans); Referee: Neale Barry

11 January 2003 27	Walsall	0–1	Wolverhampton Wanderers	Walsall
15:00 GMT		Report	Ndah 64'	Stadium: Bescot Stadium; Attendance: 11,037 (2,000 away fans); Referee: Phil Dowd

18 January 2003 28	Wolverhampton Wanderers	1–1	Wimbledon	Wolverhampton
15:00 GMT	Miller 43'	Report	Francis 46'	Stadium: Molineux; Attendance: 23,716 (306 away fans); Referee: Steve Tomlin

1 February 2003 29	Sheffield Wednesday	0–4	Wolverhampton Wanderers	Sheffield
15:00 GMT		Report	Proudlock 24', 42'; Miller 67'; Sturridge 89'	Stadium: Hillsborough; Attendance: 21,381 (2,316 away fans); Referee: Jeff Winter

8 February 2003 30	Brighton & Hove Albion	4–1	Wolverhampton Wanderers	Brighton
15:00 GMT	Zamora 31'; Blackwell 45'; Brooker 47'; Hart 67'	Report	Miller 65'	Stadium: Withdean Stadium; Attendance: 6,754 (850 away fans); Referee: Peter Walton

19 February 2003 31	Ipswich Town	2–4	Wolverhampton Wanderers	Ipswich
19:45 GMT	Bent 2'; Holland 45+1'	Report	Miller 11', 63'; Naylor 74'; Ndah 81'	Stadium: Portman Road; Attendance: 27,700 (1,638 away fans); Referee: Steve Bennett

22 February 2003 32	Preston North End	0–2	Wolverhampton Wanderers	Preston
15:00 GMT		Report	Ndah 53'; Miller 83'	Stadium: Deepdale; Attendance: 16,070 (2,796 away fans); Referee: Paul Danson

25 February 2003 33	Wolverhampton Wanderers	0–0	Watford	Wolverhampton
19:45 GMT		Report		Stadium: Molineux; Attendance: 24,591 (987 away fans); Referee: Alan Kaye

1 March 2003 34	Wolverhampton Wanderers	4–0	Crystal Palace	Wolverhampton
15:00 GMT	Miller 40', 83', 90+3' (pen.); Sturridge 77'	Report		Stadium: Molineux; Attendance: 26,010 (845 away fans); Referee: Paul Robinson

5 March 2003 35	Wolverhampton Wanderers	1–1	Ipswich Town	Wolverhampton
19:45 GMT	Ince 48'	Report	Naylor 84'	Stadium: Molineux; Attendance: 26,901 (1,500 away fans); Referee: Mike Jones

12 March 2003 36	Reading	0–1	Wolverhampton Wanderers	Reading
20:00 GMT		Report	Miller 44'	Stadium: Madejski Stadium; Attendance: 19,731 (2,686 away fans); Referee: Richard Beeby

15 March 2003 37	Portsmouth	1–0	Wolverhampton Wanderers	Portsmouth
15:00 GMT	Stone 4'	Report		Stadium: Fratton Park; Attendance: 19,558 (1,300 away fans); Referee: Phil Dowd

18 March 2003 38	Wolverhampton Wanderers	0–0	Stoke City	Wolverhampton
19:45 GMT		Report		Stadium: Molineux; Attendance: 25,235 (1,384 away fans); Referee: Jeff Winter

22 March 2003 39	Wolverhampton Wanderers	6–0	Gillingham	Wolverhampton
15:00 GMT	Blake 16'; Cameron 22'; Kennedy 37', 45+3'; Miller 45+1', 48'	Report		Stadium: Molineux; Attendance: 25,171 (674 away fans); Referee: Howard Webb

5 April 2003 40	Wolverhampton Wanderers	0–0	Rotherham United	Wolverhampton
15:00 BST	Cameron (penalty missed) 88'	Report		Stadium: Molineux; Attendance: 25,944 (774 away fans); Referee: Andy Hall

8 April 2003 41	Grimsby Town	0–1	Wolverhampton Wanderers	Cleethorpes
19:45 BST		Report	Blake 13'	Stadium: Blundell Park; Attendance: 4,983 (1,104 away fans); Referee: Eddie Wolstenholme

11 April 2003 42	Nottingham Forest	2–2	Wolverhampton Wanderers	Nottingham
19:45 BST	Johnson 40'; Dawson 74'	Report	Blake 9'; Cameron 26'	Stadium: City Ground; Attendance: 27,209 (2,100 away fans); Referee: Tony Leake

19 April 2003 43	Wolverhampton Wanderers	3–0	Millwall	Wolverhampton
15:00 BST	Newton 5', 80'; Cameron 78'	Report		Stadium: Molineux; Attendance: 27,015 (723 away fans); Referee: Matt Messias

21 April 2003 44	Norwich City	0–3	Wolverhampton Wanderers	Norwich
17:35 BST		Report	Ndah 52'; Sturridge 74'; Miller 90+3'	Stadium: Carrow Road; Attendance: 20,843 (1,788 away fans); Referee: Clive Wilkes

26 April 2003 45	Sheffield United	3–3	Wolverhampton Wanderers	Sheffield
15:00 BST	Peschisolido 2', 90+2'; Brown 55' (pen.)	Report	Ndah 10'; Sturridge 45+4', 61' (pen.)	Stadium: Bramall Lane; Attendance: 22,211 (2,523 away fans); Referee: Paul Robinson

4 May 2003 46	Wolverhampton Wanderers	1–1	Leicester City	Wolverhampton
13:30 BST	Miller 57'	Report	Benjamin 86' (pen.)	Stadium: Molineux; Attendance: 28,190 (3,000 away fans); Referee: Graham Laws

Final table

Pos	Team	Pld	W	D	L	GF	GA	GD	Pts
1	Portsmouth	46	29	11	6	97	45	+52	98
2	Leicester City	46	26	14	6	73	40	+33	92
3	Sheffield United	46	23	11	12	72	52	+20	80
4	Reading	46	25	4	17	61	46	+15	79
5	Wolverhampton Wanderers	46	20	16	10	81	44	+37	76
6	Nottingham Forest	46	20	14	12	82	50	+32	74
7	Ipswich Town	46	19	13	14	80	64	+16	70

Results summary

Overall								Home						Away					
Pld	W	D	L	GF	GA	GD	Pts	W	D	L	GF	GA	GD	W	D	L	GF	GA	GD
46	20	16	10	81	44	+37	76	9	10	4	40	19	+21	11	6	6	41	25	+16

Source: Statto.com

Results by round

Round	1	2	3	4	5	6	7	8	9	10	11	12	13	14	15	16	17	18	19	20	21	22	23	24	25	26	27	28	29	30	31	32	33	34	35	36	37	38	39	40	41	42	43	44	45	46
Result	D	W	W	W	D	L	L	L	W	L	L	W	W	W	D	D	D	W	W	D	W	L	D	L	L	D	W	D	W	L	W	W	D	W	D	W	L	D	W	D	W	D	W	W	D	D
Position	11	5	3	1	2	4	10	14	9	10	14	12	11	8	9	9	9	6	5	8	6	7	7	9	10	10	8	8	6	7	6	6	5	4	6	6	6	5	6	6	5	5	5	4	5	5

Source: Statto.com
W = Win; D = Draw; L = Loss

=== Play-offs ===
10 May 2003 SF1	Wolverhampton Wanderers	2–1	Reading	Wolverhampton
17:30 BST	Murty 75' (o.g.); Naylor 84'	Report	Forster 25'	Stadium: Molineux; Attendance: 27,678 (4,500 away fans); Referee: Alan Kaye

14 May 2003 SF2	Reading	0–1 (1–3 agg.)	Wolverhampton Wanderers	Reading
19:45 BST		Report	Rae 81'	Stadium: Madejski Stadium; Attendance: 24,060 (4,000 away fans); Referee: Howard Webb

26 May 2003 Final	Sheffield United	0–3	Wolverhampton Wanderers	Cardiff
15:00 BST		Report	Kennedy 6'; Blake 22'; Miller 45'	Stadium: Millennium Stadium; Attendance: 69,473 (33,500 Wolves); Referee: Steve Bennett

=== FA Cup ===
5 January 2003 R3	Wolverhampton Wanderers	3–2	Newcastle United	Wolverhampton
16:00 GMT	Ince 6'; Kennedy 28'; Ndah 49'	Report	Jenas 40'; Shearer 43' (pen.)	Stadium: Molineux; Attendance: 27,316 (3,000 away fans); Referee: Rob Styles

25 January 2003 R4	Wolverhampton Wanderers	4–1	Leicester City	Wolverhampton
15:00 GMT	Ndah 5', 45'; Miller 51', 71'	Report	Dickov 29' (pen.)	Stadium: Molineux; Attendance: 28,164 (2,998 away fans); Referee: Mike Dean

16 February 2003 R5	Wolverhampton Wanderers	3–1	Rochdale	Wolverhampton
19:00 GMT	Ndah 32'; Miller 79'; Proudlock 90+2'	Report	Melaugh 52'	Stadium: Molineux; Attendance: 23,921 (3,432 away fans); Referee: Uriah Rennie

9 March 2003 QF	Southampton	2–0	Wolverhampton Wanderers	Southampton
16:00 GMT	Marsden 56'; Butler 81' (o.g.)	Report		Stadium: St Mary's Stadium; Attendance: 31,715 (3,900 away fans); Referee: Andy D'Urso

=== League Cup ===
11 September 2002 R1	Swansea City	2–3	Wolverhampton Wanderers	Swansea
19:45 BST	Thomas 8'; Wood 22'	Report	Blake 16'; Pollet 34'; Rae 78'	Stadium: Vetch Field; Attendance: 4,799 (835 away fans); Referee: Scott Mathieson

1 October 2002 R2	Rotherham United	4–4 (a.e.t.) (4 - 2 p)	Wolverhampton Wanderers	Rotherham
19:45 BST	Barker 5', 93'; Robins 78' (pen.); Swailes 86'	Report	Newton 45' (pen.); Miller 58'; Rae 70'; Scott 120' (o.g.)	Stadium: Millmoor; Attendance: 5,064 (988 away fans); Referee: Phil Prosser
	Penalties
	Robins (penalty missed); Swailes (penalty scored); Bryan (penalty scored); Hurst (penalty scored); Mullin (penalty scored)		(penalty scored) Sturridge; (penalty scored) Blake; (penalty missed) Newton; (penalty missed) Irwin

== Players ==
=== Statistics ===
Key:
‡ On loan from another club * First appearance(s) for the club

- # = Squad number
- Pos = Playing position
- P = Number of games played
- G = Number of goals scored
- GK = Goalkeeper
- DF = Defender
- MF = Midfielder
- FW = Forward
- = Yellow cards
- = Red cards
- † Permanent player left club during the season
- ¤ Loaned to another club for part or all of season

Correct as of the season's end. Starting appearances are listed first, followed by substitute appearances in parentheses where applicable.

No.	Pos	Name	P	G	P	G	P	G	P	G	P	G	A yellow card	A red card	Notes
No.	Pos	Name	League		FA Cup		League Cup		Playoffs		Total		Discipline		Notes
1	GK	(England) Michael Oakes	6	0	0	0	1	0	0	0	7	0	0	0	
2	DF	(England) Sean Connelly †	0	0	0	0	0	0	0	0	0	0	0	0	
3	DF	(England) Lee Naylor	31(1)	1	4	0	2	0	3	1	40(1)	2	1	0	
4	MF	(Scotland) Alex Rae	30(8)	3	0(2)	0	2	2	0(1)	1	32(11)	6	9	0	
5	DF	(England) Joleon Lescott	44	1	4	0	1	0	3	0	52	1	1	0	
6	DF	(Republic of Ireland) Paul Butler	31(1)	1	4	0	2	0	3	0	40(1)	1	10	0	
7	MF	(England) Shaun Newton	29(4)	3	4	0	2	1	2(1)	0	37(5)	4	5	0	
8	DF	(Republic of Ireland) Denis Irwin	43	2	4	0	1(1)	0	3	0	51(1)	2	6	0	
9	FW	(Wales) Nathan Blake	22(1)	12	1	0	2	1	3	1	28(1)	14	6	1	
10	MF	(Scotland) Colin Cameron	29(4)	7	4	0	0	0	3	0	36(4)	7	3	0	
11	MF	(Republic of Ireland) Mark Kennedy	30(1)	3	4	1	0	0	3	1	37(1)	5	4	0	
12	FW	(England) Adam Proudlock ¤	2(15)	2	0(3)	1	0(1)	0	0(1)	0	2(20)	3	1	0	
13	GK	(England) Matt Murray	40	0	4	0	1	0	3	0	48	0	0	0	
14	DF	(France) Ludovic Pollet ¤	2(0)	0	0	0	1	1	0(1)	0	3(1)	1	1	0	
15	MF	(England) Kevin Cooper	13(13)	3	0(1)	0	0	0	0(1)	0	13(15)	3	5	0	
16	FW	(Scotland) Kenny Miller	35(8)	19	4	3	1(1)	1	3	1	43(9)	24	5	0	
17	DF	(Guinea) Mo Camara	0	0	0	0	0	0	0	0	0	0	0	0	
18	FW	(Nigeria) George Ndah	17(8)	7	3	4	1	0	1	0	22(8)	11	7	0	
19	MF	(Republic of Ireland) Keith Andrews	2(7)	0	1	0	0	0	0	0	3(7)	0	1	0	
20	FW	(England) Michael Branch ¤	0	0	0	0	0	0	0	0	0	0	0	0	
21	DF	(Iceland) Ívar Ingimarsson ¤	10(3)	2	0	0	2	0	0	0	12(3)	2	2	0	
23	MF	(England) Paul Ince (c)	35(2)	2	4	1	1(1)	0	3	0	43(3)	3	13	0	
24	DF	(England) Marc Edworthy	18(4)	0	0	0	1	0	0	0	19(4)	0	3	0	
29	FW	(England) Dean Sturridge	17(22)	11	0(1)	0	0(1)	0	0(3)	0	17(27)	11	4	0	
30	GK	(United States) Ian Feuer †	0	0	0	0	0	0	0	0	0	0	0	0	
31	DF	(Northern Ireland) Mark Clyde ¤	15(2)	0	0(1)	0	0	0	0	0	15(3)	0	1	0	
32	MF	(Republic of Ireland) John Melligan ¤	0(2)	0	0	0	0	0	0	0	0(2)	0	0	0	
33	MF	(Republic of Ireland) Graham Ward	0	0	0	0	0	0	0	0	0	0	0	0	
34	MF	(Northern Ireland) Sammy Clingan	0	0	0	0	0	0	0	0	0	0	0	0	
35	DF	(Republic of Ireland) Kenny Coleman ¤	0	0	0	0	0	0	0	0	0	0	0	0	
36	GK	(England) Lewis Solly †	0	0	0	0	0	0	0	0	0	0	0	0	
37	GK	(Australia) Adam Federici	0	0	0	0	0	0	0	0	0	0	0	0	
39	FW	(England) Carlton Cole ‡	5(2)	1	0	0	0	0	0	0	5(2)	1	0	0	

=== Awards ===
Award	Winner
Fans' Player of the Season	Joleon Lescott
Young Player of the Season	Matt Murray

== Transfers ==
=== In ===
Date	Player	From	Fee
1 July 2002	(Iceland) Ívar Ingimarsson	Unattached	Free
23 July 2002	(Republic of Ireland) Denis Irwin	Unattached	Free
6 August 2002	(England) Paul Ince	Unattached	Free
23 August 2002	(England) Marc Edworthy	Unattached	Free
18 September 2002	(United States) Ian Feuer	Unattached	Non-contract
26 February 2003	(Australia) Adam Federici	Unattached	End of season

=== Out ===
Date	Player	To	Fee
June 2002	(England) Andy Sinton	Released	Free
June 2002	(Wales) Carl Robinson	Released	Free
1 July 2002	(Australia) Kevin Muscat	(Scotland) Rangers	Free
11 July 2002	(England) Darren Bazeley	Released	Free
2 August 2002	(Republic of Ireland) Colin Larkin	Mansfield Town	£120,000
28 September 2002	(United States) Ian Feuer	Released	Free
10 October 2002	(England) Sean Connelly	Released	Free
28 March 2003	(England) Lewis Solly	Bury	Free

=== Loans in ===
Start date	Player	From	End date
28 November 2002	(England) Carlton Cole	Chelsea	3 January 2003

=== Loans out ===
Start date	Player	To	End date
1 July 2002	(Belgium) Cédric Roussel	(Belgium) Mons	End of season
12 September 2002	(Northern Ireland) Mark Clyde	Kidderminster Harriers	12 October 2002
12 September 2002	(Republic of Ireland) John Melligan	Kidderminster Harriers	4 May 2003
4 October 2002	(England) Michael Branch	Hull City	3 December 2002
10 October 2002	(Republic of Ireland) Kenny Coleman	Kidderminster Harriers	End of season
25 October 2002	(England) Adam Proudlock	Tranmere Rovers	25 November 2002
14 November 2002	(France) Ludovic Pollet	Walsall	1 January 2003
13 December 2002	(England) Adam Proudlock	Sheffield Wednesday	7 January 2003
10 February 2003	(Iceland) Ívar Ingimarsson	Brighton & Hove Albion	4 May 2003

== Kit ==
The season saw new home and away kits, manufactured by Admiral. The home strip reverted to a lighter gold colour after two years wearing a darker "old gold" style, while the away kit returned to the club's traditional all-white look. After twelve seasons sponsored by Goodyear, the club signed a two-year deal with Doritos.
