= 2004–05 Wolverhampton Wanderers F.C. season =

English football club season

Wolverhampton Wanderers
2004–05 season
- Chairman: Rick Hayward
- Manager: Dave Jones (until 1 November); Glenn Hoddle (from 7 December)
- Football League Championship: 9th
- FA Cup: 4th round
- League Cup: 2nd round
- Top goalscorer: League: Kenny Miller (19); All: Kenny Miller (20)
- Highest home attendance: 28,516 (vs. Brighton, 28 December 2004)
- Lowest home attendance: 12,566 (vs. Millwall, 8 January 2005)
- Average home league attendance: 26,620 (league only)

The 2004–05 season was the 106th season of competitive league football in the history of English football club Wolverhampton Wanderers. They played the season in the 2nd tier of the English football system, the Football League Championship, after having suffered relegation from the Premier League during the previous campaign.

== Season summary ==
Despite hopes for an immediate return to the top flight, their 2004–05 Championship campaign began dismally, and at one point the side sunk as low as 19th place. Following a 0–1 defeat at Gillingham, a side Wolves had beaten 6–0 just 18 months previous, Jones was sacked at the beginning of November.

Another former England coach was hired the following month, as Glenn Hoddle was appointed on a rolling one-year contract. Under Hoddle, Wolves lost only one of their final 24 league games, but drew 15 to finish ninth in the final table – not enough to qualify for the play-offs.

== Results ==
=== Preseason ===
Pre season began on 5 July with training based at the National Sports Centre at Lilleshall, before the squad flew to Tromsø, Norway to begin a three-match tour (16–22 July).

14 July 2004	Tamworth	1–5	Wolverhampton Wanderers	Tamworth
19:30 BST	Bryan 85'	Report	Ganea 10', 32'; Andrews 18', 36'; Newton 20'	Stadium: The Lamb Ground; Referee: Simon Barrow

17 July 2004	Tromsø	2–3	Wolverhampton Wanderers	Nordreisa, Norway
15:00 BST	Pedersen 65', 88'	Report	Craddock 29'; Ganea 46', 58'	Stadium: Storslett Stadion; Attendance: 1,400; Referee: J. Mathiesen

19 July 2004	Bodø/Glimt	2–0	Wolverhampton Wanderers	Bodø, Norway
19:00 BST	Johansen 14', 21'	Report		Stadium: Aspmyra Stadion; Attendance: 1,177; Referee: Jonny Ditlefsen

21 July 2004	Lyn	2–1	Wolverhampton Wanderers	Oslo, Norway
18:00 BST	Lustü 33'; Cha 90'	Report	Ince 15'	Stadium: Ullevaal Stadion; Attendance: 828; Referee: Harald Sjetne

24 July 2004	Northampton Town	0–0	Wolverhampton Wanderers	Northampton
19:30 BST		Report		Stadium: Sixfields; Attendance: 3,132; Referee: Andy Woolmer

28 July 2004	Mansfield Town	1–2	Wolverhampton Wanderers	Mansfield
19:45 BST	Day 62'	Report	Miller 33'; Newton 65'	Stadium: Field Mill; Attendance: 3,300; Referee: Andy Woolmer

30 July 2004	Wolverhampton Wanderers	1–3	Manchester City	Wolverhampton
19:45 BST	Miller 13'	Report	Iencsi 34' (o.g.); Wright-Phillips 45'; Wanchope 66'	Stadium: Molineux; Attendance: 7,131; Referee: Peter Walton

=== Football League Championship ===
A total of 24 teams competed in the Championship during the 2004–05 season. Each team would play every other team twice, once at their stadium, and once at the opposition's. Three points were awarded to teams for each win, one point per draw, and none for defeats. The provisional fixture list was released on 24 June 2004, but was subject to change in the event of matches being selected for television coverage or police concerns.

8 August 2004 1	Stoke City	2–1	Wolverhampton Wanderers	Stoke-on-Trent
12:15 BST	Russell 55'; Clarke 70' (pen.)	Report	Miller 88' (pen.)	Stadium: Britannia Stadium; Attendance: 17,066 (3,966 away fans); Referee: Alan Kaye

11 August 2004 2	Wolverhampton Wanderers	2–2	Preston North End	Wolverhampton
19:45 BST	Clarke 76'; Miller 79'	Report	Lucketti 4'; Healy 15'	Stadium: Molineux; Attendance: 26,115 (1,023 away fans); Referee: Paul Armstrong

14 August 2004 3	Wolverhampton Wanderers	0–0	Leeds United	Wolverhampton
15:00 BST	Miller (penalty missed) 87'	Report		Stadium: Molineux; Attendance: 28,397 (2,621 away fans); Referee: Graham Laws

21 August 2004 4	Burnley	1–1	Wolverhampton Wanderers	Burnley
15:00 BST	Blake 24'	Report	Newton 15'	Stadium: Turf Moor; Attendance: 13,869 (1,237 away fans); Referee: Colin Webster

28 August 2004 5	Wolverhampton Wanderers	1–1	Leicester City	Wolverhampton
15:00 BST	Miller 52'	Report	Scowcroft 4'	Stadium: Molineux; Attendance: 27,550 (2,068 away fans); Referee: Anthony Bates

30 August 2004 6	Ipswich Town	2–1	Wolverhampton Wanderers	Ipswich
15:00 BST	Bent 28'; Miller 50' (pen.)	Report	Olofinjana 54'	Stadium: Portman Road; Attendance: 24,590 (1,345 away fans); Referee: Phil Crossley

11 September 2004 7	Wolverhampton Wanderers	3–3	Wigan Athletic	Wolverhampton
15:00 BST	Miller 15', 65' (penalty missed) 58'; Cameron 90+1'	Report	Jackson 23'; Ellington 28'; Roberts 75' (pen.)	Stadium: Molineux; Attendance: 26,790 (2,165 away fans); Referee: Peter Walton

14 September 2004 8	Brighton & Hove Albion	0–1	Wolverhampton Wanderers	Brighton
19:45 BST		Report	Miller 22'	Stadium: Withdean Stadium; Attendance: 6,804 (718 away fans); Referee: Tony Leake

18 September 2004 9	Plymouth Argyle	1–2	Wolverhampton Wanderers	Plymouth
15:00 BST	Friio 62'	Report	Cort 77' (pen.); Sturridge 85'	Stadium: Home Park; Attendance: 18,635 (1,500 away fans); Referee: Richard Beeby

25 September 2004 10	Wolverhampton Wanderers	2–3	Cardiff City	Wolverhampton
15:00 BST	Cort 12'; Ince 85'	Report	Parry 11'; Thorne 48'; Kavanagh 59'	Stadium: Molineux; Attendance: 27,896 (2,098 away fans); Referee: Mike Pike

2 October 2004 11	West Ham United	1–0	Wolverhampton Wanderers	London
15:00 BST	Sheringham 75'	Report		Stadium: Upton Park; Attendance: 29,585 (3,000 away fans); Referee: Barry Knight

15 October 2004 12	Nottingham Forest	1–0	Wolverhampton Wanderers	Nottingham
19:45 BST	Reid 42'	Report	Newton (penalty missed) 57'	Stadium: City Ground; Attendance: 21,865 (1,958 away fans); Referee: Paul Robinson

19 October 2004 13	Wolverhampton Wanderers	2–0	Derby County	Wolverhampton
19:45 BST	Cooper 19' (pen.), 50'	Report		Stadium: Molineux; Attendance: 26,465 (1,718 away fans); Referee: Dermot Gallagher

23 October 2004 14	Wolverhampton Wanderers	2–1	Queens Park Rangers	Wolverhampton
15:00 BST	Cort 22', 70'	Report	Gallen 90+1'	Stadium: Molineux; Attendance: 27,070 (1,787 away fans); Referee: Lee Probert

30 October 2004 15	Gillingham	1–0	Wolverhampton Wanderers	Gillingham
15:00 BST	Jarvis 18'	Report		Stadium: Priestfield; Attendance: 9,112 (1,571 away fans); Referee: Trevor Kettle

2 November 2004 16	Sunderland	3–1	Wolverhampton Wanderers	Sunderland
19:45 GMT	Lawrence 57', 80'; Elliott 68'	Report	Miller 18'	Stadium: Stadium of Light; Attendance: 23,925 (863 away fans); Referee: Tony Leake

6 November 2004 17	Wolverhampton Wanderers	2–1	Nottingham Forest	Wolverhampton
15:00 GMT	Cooper 19' (pen.); Bischoff 43'	Report	Johnson 25'	Stadium: Molineux; Attendance: 27,605 (2,067 away fans); Referee: Michael Ryan

13 November 2004 18	Rotherham United	1–2	Wolverhampton Wanderers	Rotherham
15:00 GMT	McIntosh 36'	Report	Cooper 69'; Cort 79'	Stadium: Millmoor; Attendance: 6,693 (1,764 away fans); Referee: Mark Halsey

20 November 2004 19	Wolverhampton Wanderers	0–1	Coventry City	Wolverhampton
12:30 GMT		Report	McSheffrey 61'	Stadium: Molineux; Attendance: 26,291 (2,100 away fans); Referee: Martin Atkinson

27 November 2004 20	Sheffield United	3–3	Wolverhampton Wanderers	Sheffield
15:00 GMT	Bromby 28'; Thirlwell 53'; Shaw 72'	Report	Olofinjana 7'; Cort 50'; Lescott 87'	Stadium: Bramall Lane; Attendance: 18,946 (2,463 away fans); Referee: Lee Mason

4 December 2004 21	Wolverhampton Wanderers	4–1	Reading	Wolverhampton
15:00 GMT	Cameron 31'; Olofinjana 45+1'; Clarke 77', 90'	Report	Morgan 47'	Stadium: Molineux; Attendance: 25,572 (1,183 away fans); Referee: Steve Bennett

7 December 2004 22	Wolverhampton Wanderers	1–2	Millwall	Wolverhampton
19:45 GMT	Cooper 57' (pen.)	Report	Dobie 9'; Dichio 72'	Stadium: Molineux; Attendance: 24,748 (615 away fans); Referee: Trevor Kettle

11 December 2004 23	Watford	1–1	Wolverhampton Wanderers	Watford
15:00 GMT	Helguson 4'	Report	Olofinjana 35'	Stadium: Vicarage Road; Attendance: 14,605 (2,177 away fans); Referee: Paul Armstrong

18 December 2004 24	Wolverhampton Wanderers	1–1	Crewe Alexandra	Wolverhampton
15:00 GMT	Cort 90+1'	Report	Ashton 38'	Stadium: Molineux; Attendance: 25,340 (901 away fans); Referee: Barry Curson

26 December 2004 25	Cardiff City	1–1	Wolverhampton Wanderers	Cardiff
13:00 GMT	Jerome 17'	Report	Miller 75'	Stadium: Ninian Park; Attendance: 16,699 (1,600 away fans); Referee: Paul Taylor

28 December 2004 26	Wolverhampton Wanderers	1–1	Brighton & Hove Albion	Wolverhampton
15:00 GMT	Miller 33'	Report	Hart 4'	Stadium: Molineux; Attendance: 28,516 (1,406 away fans); Referee: Mike Jones

1 January 2005 27	Wolverhampton Wanderers	1–1	Plymouth Argyle	Wolverhampton
15:00 GMT	Seol 24'	Report	Friio 58'	Stadium: Molineux; Attendance: 27,564 (1,782 away fans); Referee: Colin Webster

4 January 2005 28	Wigan Athletic	2–0	Wolverhampton Wanderers	Wigan
20:00 GMT	Ellington 17', 26' (pen.)	Report		Stadium: JJB Stadium; Attendance: 10,135 (1,512 away fans); Referee: Kevin Friend

15 January 2005 29	Wolverhampton Wanderers	4–2	West Ham United	Wolverhampton
15:00 GMT	Miller 29', 54'; Ince 72'; Cort 75'	Report	Zamora 36', 57'	Stadium: Molineux; Attendance: 28,411 (2,633 away fans); Referee: Clive Penton

22 January 2005 30	Millwall	1–2	Wolverhampton Wanderers	London
15:00 GMT	Wise 77' (pen.)	Report	Olofinjana 37'; Seol 90+3'	Stadium: The New Den; Attendance: 13,145 (1,327 away fans); Referee: Keith Hill

4 February 2005 31	Wolverhampton Wanderers	1–1	Sunderland	Wolverhampton
19:45 GMT	Seol 13'	Report	Elliott 12'	Stadium: Molineux; Attendance: 26,968 (1,366 away fans); Referee: Phil Joslin

19 February 2005 32	Wolverhampton Wanderers	2–2	Gillingham	Wolverhampton
15:00 GMT	Miller 60'; Clarke 90+1'	Report	Henderson 55'; Flynn 90'	Stadium: Molineux; Attendance: 24,949 (695 away fans); Referee: Keith Woolmer

22 February 2005 33	Queens Park Rangers	1–1	Wolverhampton Wanderers	London
19:45 GMT	Gallen 11'	Report	Cort 85'	Stadium: Loftus Road; Attendance: 15,029 (2,544 away fans); Referee: Martin Atkinson

26 February 2005 34	Wolverhampton Wanderers	0–0	Watford	Wolverhampton
15:00 GMT		Report		Stadium: Molineux; Attendance: 25,060 (1,083 away fans); Referee: Graham Salisbury

2 March 2005 35	Derby County	3–3	Wolverhampton Wanderers	Derby
19:45 GMT	Idiakez 9', 77' (pen.); Reich 90+2'	Report	Miller 12'; Lescott 72'; Cort 90'	Stadium: Pride Park; Attendance: 24,109 (1,578 away fans); Referee: Iain Williamson

5 March 2005 36	Crewe Alexandra	1–4	Wolverhampton Wanderers	Crewe
15:00 GMT	Lunt 11' (pen.)	Report	Cort 13', 45+2'; Miller 35' (pen.), 60'	Stadium: Gresty Road; Attendance: 8,212 (2,200 away fans); Referee: Nigel Miller

12 March 2005 37	Preston North End	2–2	Wolverhampton Wanderers	Preston
15:00 GMT	Cresswell 3'; Alexander 53' (pen.)	Report	Craddock 10'; Seol 73'	Stadium: Deepdale; Attendance: 16,296 (1,986 away fans); Referee: Andre Marriner

15 March 2005 38	Wolverhampton Wanderers	2–0	Burnley	Wolverhampton
19:45 GMT	Miller 38'; Ince 60'	Report		Stadium: Molineux; Attendance: 24,336 (839 away fans); Referee: Carl Boyeson

19 March 2005 39	Wolverhampton Wanderers	1–1	Stoke City	Wolverhampton
15:00 GMT	Cort 90+4'	Report	Noel-Williams 41'	Stadium: Molineux; Attendance: 28,103 (2,293 away fans); Referee: Chris Foy

2 April 2005 40	Leeds United	1–1	Wolverhampton Wanderers	Leeds
15:00 BST	Derry 50'	Report	Cort 40'	Stadium: Elland Road; Attendance: 29,773 (2,486 away fans); Referee: Phil Crossley

4 April 2005 41	Leicester City	1–1	Wolverhampton Wanderers	Leicester
19:45 BST	Maybury 73'	Report	Lescott 88'	Stadium: Walkers Stadium; Attendance: 22,950 (2,621 away fans); Referee: Eddie Evans

11 April 2005 42	Wolverhampton Wanderers	2–0	Ipswich Town	Wolverhampton
19:45 BST	Cameron 5'; Cort 22'	Report		Stadium: Molineux; Attendance: 25,882 (1,286 away fans); Referee: Steve Dunn

16 April 2005 43	Coventry City	2–2	Wolverhampton Wanderers	Coventry
15:00 BST	McSheffrey 19' (pen.); John 90'	Report	Clarke 15'; Naylor 79'	Stadium: Highfield Road; Attendance: 19,412 (2,800 away fans); Referee: Grant Hegley

23 April 2005 44	Wolverhampton Wanderers	2–0	Rotherham United	Wolverhampton
15:00 BST	Miller 55', 90+5'	Report		Stadium: Molineux; Attendance: 25,177 (731 away fans); Referee: Mike Pike

30 April 2005 45	Reading	1–2	Wolverhampton Wanderers	Reading
15:00 BST	Forster 8'	Report	Clarke 53'; Ricketts 84'	Stadium: Madejski Stadium; Attendance: 20,495 (2,000 away fans); Referee: Rob Styles

8 May 2005 46	Wolverhampton Wanderers	4–2	Sheffield United	Wolverhampton
13:00 BST	Lescott 12'; Clarke 23'; Cooper 50'; Miller 60'	Report	Quinn 13'; Gray 37'	Stadium: Molineux; Attendance: 27,454 (1,710 away fans); Referee: Peter Walton

Final table

Pos	Team	Pld	W	D	L	GF	GA	GD	Pts
6	West Ham United	46	21	10	15	66	56	+10	73
7	Reading	46	19	13	14	51	44	+7	70
8	Sheffield United	46	18	13	15	57	56	+1	67
9	Wolverhampton Wanderers	46	15	21	10	72	59	+13	66

Results summary

Overall								Home						Away					
Pld	W	D	L	GF	GA	GD	Pts	W	D	L	GF	GA	GD	W	D	L	GF	GA	GD
46	15	21	10	72	59	+13	66	9	11	3	40	26	+14	6	10	7	32	33	−1

Source: Statto.com

Results by round

Round	1	2	3	4	5	6	7	8	9	10	11	12	13	14	15	16	17	18	19	20	21	22	23	24	25	26	27	28	29	30	31	32	33	34	35	36	37	38	39	40	41	42	43	44	45	46
Result	L	D	D	D	D	L	D	W	W	L	L	L	W	W	L	L	W	W	L	D	W	L	D	D	D	D	D	L	W	W	D	D	D	D	D	W	D	W	D	D	D	W	D	W	W	W
Position	20	19	20	20	19	21	20	19	15	18	20	21	20	18	19	20	17	15	18	19	17	17	17	16	17	17	18	19	18	15	15	18	16	17	16	13	14	13	13	13	13	12	13	10	10	9

Source: Statto.com
W = Win; D = Draw; L = Loss

=== FA Cup ===
8 January 2005 R3	Wolverhampton Wanderers	2–0	Millwall	Wolverhampton
15:00 GMT	Seol 8'; Cort 11'	Report		Stadium: Molineux; Attendance: 12,566 (1,389 away fans); Referee: Lee Mason

29 January 2005 R4	Arsenal	2–0	Wolverhampton Wanderers	London
15:00 GMT	Vieira 53' (pen.); Ljungberg 82'	Report		Stadium: Highbury; Attendance: 37,153 (5,900 away fans); Referee: Mike Riley

=== League Cup ===
23 August 2004 R1	Rochdale	2–4	Wolverhampton Wanderers	Rochdale
19:45 BST	Holt 4'; Tait 26'	Report	Ince 42'; Clarke 53'; Miller 60'; Andrews 78'	Stadium: Spotland; Attendance: 3,292 (1,022 away fans); Referee: Paul Robinson

21 September 2004 R2	Burnley	1–1 (a.e.t.) (4 - 2 p)	Wolverhampton Wanderers	Burnley
19:45 BST	Blake 50'	Report	Seol 45'; Cort (penalty missed) 75'; Andrews (penalty missed) 79'	Stadium: Turf Moor; Attendance: 5,013 (536 away fans); Referee: Paul Taylor
	Penalties
	Moore (penalty scored); Chaplow (penalty scored); Blake (penalty scored); Sinclair (penalty scored)		(penalty missed) Cort; (penalty scored) Andrews; (penalty scored) Naylor; (penalty missed) Olofinjana

== Players ==
=== Statistics ===
Key:
‡ On loan from another club * First appearance(s) for the club

- # = Squad number
- Pos = Playing position
- P = Number of games played
- G = Number of goals scored
- GK = Goalkeeper
- DF = Defender
- MF = Midfielder
- FW = Forward
- = Yellow cards
- = Red cards
- † Permanent player left club during the season
- ¤ Loaned to another club for part or all of season

Correct as of end of season. Starting appearances are listed first, followed by substitute appearances in parentheses where applicable.

No.	Pos	Name	P	G	P	G	P	G	P	G	A yellow card	A red card	Notes
No.	Pos	Name	League		FA Cup		League Cup		Total		Discipline		Notes
1	GK	(England) Michael Oakes	35	0	1	0	2	0	38	0	0	0	
2	DF	(Northern Ireland) Mark Clyde	17(1)	0	1	0	2	0	20(1)	0	5	0	
3	DF	(England) Lee Naylor	36(2)	1	2	0	1	0	39(2)	1	4	0	
4	MF	(Nigeria) Seyi Olofinjana	41(1)	5	2	0	1(1)	0	44(2)	5	5	0	
5	DF	(England) Joleon Lescott	41	4	2	0	0	0	43	4	5	0	
6	DF	(England) Jody Craddock	40(2)	1	2	0	2	0	44(2)	1	4	0	
7	MF	(England) Shaun Newton †	21(3)	1	1(1)	0	2	0	24(4)	1	1	0	
8	MF	(England) Paul Ince (c)	25(3)	3	2	0	1	1	28(3)	4	8	0	
9	FW	(Romania) Vio Ganea	0	0	0	0	0	0	0	0	0	0	
10	MF	(Scotland) Colin Cameron	24(13)	3	0(2)	0	1	0	25(15)	3	3	0	
11	MF	(Republic of Ireland) Mark Kennedy	27(3)	0	2	0	0	0	29(3)	0	1	0	
12	DF	(Wales) Rob Edwards	15(2)	0	0	0	1	0	16(2)	0	2	0	
13	GK	(England) Matt Murray	1	0	1	0	0	0	2	0	0	0	
14	MF	(Portugal) Silas ¤	0	0	0	0	0	0	0	0	0	0	
15	MF	(England) Kevin Cooper	15(15)	6	0	0	1	0	16(15)	6	0	1	
16	FW	(Scotland) Kenny Miller	41(3)	19	1(1)	0	1	1	43(4)	20	8	1	
17	FW	(Senegal) Henri Camara ¤	0	0	0	0	0	0	0	0	0	0	
18	FW	(Nigeria) George Ndah	0	0	0	0	0	0	0	0	0	0	
19	MF	(South Korea) Seol Ki-Hyeon	28(9)	4	2	1	1	1	31(9)	6	3	0	
20	DF	(Sweden) Joachim Björklund	2(1)	0	1	0	1	0	4(1)	0	0	0	
21	GK	(Wales) Paul Jones ¤	10	0	0	0	0	0	10	0	0	0	
24	MF	(Republic of Ireland) Keith Andrews	14(6)	0	2	0	2	1	18(6)	1	0	0	
25	DF	(Denmark) Mikkel Bischoff ‡	9(2)	1	0	0	0	0	9(2)	1	0	0	
27	FW	(Guyana) Carl Cort	34(3)	15	2	1	1	0	37(3)	16	1	0	
28	MF	(England) Rohan Ricketts ‡	3(4)	1	0	0	0	0	3(4)	1	1	0	
29	FW	(England) Dean Sturridge †	5(6)	1	0	0	0	0	5(6)	1	2	0	
30	GK	(Nigeria) Carl Ikeme ¤	0	0	0	0	0	0	0	0	0	0	
32	MF	(Northern Ireland) Sammy Clingan ¤	0	0	0	0	0	0	0	0	0	0	
33	FW	(England) Leon Clarke	11(17)	7	0(1)	0	1(1)	1	12(19)	8	3	0	
34	MF	(England) Lewis Gobern ¤	0	0	0	0	0	0	0	0	0	0	
35	FW	(Republic of Ireland) Gary Mulligan ¤	0(1)	0	0	0	0	0	0(1)	0	0	0	
37	MF	(England) Chris Cornes	0	0	0	0	0	0	0	0	0	0	
40	DF	(England) Keith Lowe	11	0	0	0	1(1)	0	12(1)	0	0	0	

=== Awards ===
Award	Winner
Fans' Player of the Season	Joleon Lescott
Players' Player of the Season	Joleon Lescott
Young Player of the Season	Leon Clarke
Goal of the Season	Kenny Miller (vs Preston, 11 August 2004)

== Transfers ==
=== In ===
Date	Player	From	Fee
14 July 2004	(Nigeria) Seyi Olofinjana	(Norway) Brann	£1.7 million
20 July 2004	(Wales) Rob Edwards	Aston Villa	£150,000
5 August 2004	(Sweden) Joachim Björklund	Unattached	Free
27 August 2004	(South Korea) Seol Ki-Hyeon	(Belgium) Anderlecht	£1.2 million

=== Out ===
Date	Player	To	Fee
17 May 2004	(England) Ashley Vincent	Cheltenham Town	Free
18 May 2004	(Scotland) Alex Rae	(Scotland) Rangers	Free
14 June 2004	(Republic of Ireland) Paul Butler	Leeds United	Free
June 2004	(Wales) Nathan Blake	Released	Free
June 2004	(Republic of Ireland) Denis Irwin	Retired	–
June 2004	(Norway) Steffen Iversen	Released	Free
June 2004	(Ukraine) Oleh Luzhnyi	Released	Free
June 2004	(Nigeria) Isaac Okoronkwo	Released	Free
June 2004	(England) Marlon Walters	Released	Free
8 July 2004	(Republic of Ireland) John Melligan	Cheltenham Town	£25,000
31 December 2004	(England) Michael Townsend	Cheltenham Town	Free
10 March 2005	(England) Shaun Newton	West Ham United	£125,000
18 March 2005	(England) Dean Sturridge	Queens Park Rangers	Free

=== Loans in ===
Date	Player	From	End date
30 September 2004	(Denmark) Mikkel Bischoff	Manchester City	15 November 2004
14 March 2005	(England) Rohan Ricketts	Tottenham Hotspur	End of season
24 March 2005	(Denmark) Mikkel Bischoff	Manchester City	End of season

=== Loans out ===
Date	Player	To	End date
29 June 2004	(Portugal) Silas	(Portugal) Marítimo	End of season
30 July 2004	(Senegal) Henri Camara	(Scotland) Celtic	31 January 2005
7 October 2004	(Northern Ireland) Sammy Clingan	Chesterfield	8 January 2005
13 October 2004	(Republic of Ireland) Gary Mulligan	Rushden & Diamonds	13 January 2005
13 October 2004	(Nigeria) Carl Ikeme	Accrington Stanley	13 November 2004
1 November 2004	(England) Lewis Gobern	Hartlepool United	1 December 2004
23 December 2004	(Wales) Paul Jones	Watford	23 February 2005
31 January 2005	(Senegal) Henri Camara	Southampton	End of season

== Kit ==
The season saw a new kit manufacturer as Le Coq Sportif began a two-year merchandising deal. Chaucer Consulting began a five-year run as the club's shirt sponsor. This meant new home and away kits were produced; the away kit was a navy blue shirt with white shorts and socks.
