= 2001–02 Wolverhampton Wanderers F.C. season =

English football club season

Wolverhampton Wanderers
2001–02 season
- Chairman: Sir Jack Hayward OBE
- Manager: Dave Jones
- Football League First Division: 3rd (lost in play-offs)
- FA Cup: 3rd Round
- League Cup: 1st Round
- Top goalscorer: League: Dean Sturridge (21); All: Dean Sturridge (21)
- Highest home attendance: 28,015 (vs Manchester City, 1 April 2002)
- Lowest home attendance: 7,598 (vs Swindon, 22 August 2001)
- Average home league attendance: 23,796 (league only)

The 2001–02 season was the 103rd season of competitive league football in the history of English football club Wolverhampton Wanderers. They played the season in the second tier of the English football system, the Football League First Division.

The season proved a notable disappointment for the club after being denied promotion in the play-offs. The team had sat in the automatic promotion spots for the majority of the campaign, but a late slump in form saw local rivals West Bromwich Albion pip them to second place. Defeat to Norwich City in the semi-finals then ended their hopes of returning to the top flight for the first time since 1984.

The club had spent in excess of £11 million before and during the season to try to achieve promotion, in this, manager Dave Jones' first full season in charge.

== Results ==
=== Preseason ===
Wolves' pre season saw them spend a week in Caldas da Rainha, Portugal (13–22 July), training and playing three Portuguese sides. This schedule was a change from their initial plans to compete in the Toronto Soccer Festival against both Canadian sides and other overseas entrants. However this event was cancelled two months beforehand.

12 July 2001	Telford United	0–4	Wolverhampton Wanderers	Telford
19:00 BST		Report	Kennedy 21'; Ndah 26'; Ketsbaia 35'; Robinson 37'	Stadium: Bucks Head; Attendance: 1,641

12 July 2001	Oswestry Town	0–3	Wolverhampton Wanderers	Oswestry
19:00 BST		Report	Bazeley; Tudor 55'; Eccleston 65' (o.g.)	Stadium: Park Hall; Attendance: 583

16 July 2001	Espinho	2–2	Wolverhampton Wanderers	Caldas da Rainha, Portugal
18:00 BST	Marcelo 42'; Phill 52'	Report	Roussel 54'; Robinson 58'	Stadium: Campo da Mata; Referee: Carlo Coutinho

18 July 2001	União de Leiria	2–0	Wolverhampton Wanderers	Leiria, Portugal
21:30 BST	Derlei 65' (pen.), 77'	Report		Stadium: Estadio Municipal de Leiria

21 July 2001	Alverca	2–1	Wolverhampton Wanderers	Alverca do Ribatejo, Portugal
21:40 BST	Cajú 18'; Ramires 38'	Report	Proudlock 5'	Stadium: Complexo Desportivo do Alverca

28 July 2001	Shrewsbury Town	0–2	Wolverhampton Wanderers	Shrewsbury
15:00 BST		Report	Suarez 5'; Butler 41'	Stadium: Gay Meadow; Attendance: 2,312

31 July 2001	Royal Antwerp	2–2	Wolverhampton Wanderers	Antwerp
20:00 BST	Sanda Sanda 56'; Sergeant 59'	Report	Suarez 3'; Roussel 21'	Stadium: Bosuil Stadium; Attendance: 3,500

3 August 2001	Wolverhampton Wanderers	0–3	Liverpool	Wolverhampton
19:45 BST		Report	Hyypiä 27'; Hamann 32'; Fowler 58'	Stadium: Molineux; Attendance: 27,510; Referee: Mark Warren

=== Football League First Division ===
A total of 24 teams competed in the Football League First Division in the 2001–02 season. Each team played every other team twice: once at their stadium, and once at the opposition's. Three points were awarded to teams for each win, one point per draw, and none for defeats.

The provisional fixture list was released on 21 June 2001, but was subject to change in the event of matches being selected for television coverage or police concerns.

11 August 2001 1	Wolverhampton Wanderers	2–2	Portsmouth	Wolverhampton
15:00 BST	Newton 45'; Roussel 57'	Report	Crouch 8'; Crowe 20'	Stadium: Molineux; Attendance: 23,012 (3,186 away fans); Referee: Mike Pike

19 August 2001 2	Coventry City	0–1	Wolverhampton Wanderers	Coventry
18:15 BST		Report	Robinson 7'	Stadium: Highfield Road; Attendance: 22,902 (3,800 away fans); Referee: Uriah Rennie

25 August 2001 3	Wolverhampton Wanderers	1–0	Watford	Wolverhampton
15:00 BST	Vega 9' (o.g.)	Report		Stadium: Molineux; Attendance: 20,257 (1,378 away fans); Referee: Roger Furnandiz

27 August 2001 4	Sheffield United	2–2	Wolverhampton Wanderers	Sheffield
15:00 BST	D'Jaffo 49' (pen.); Asaba 83'	Report	Roussel 29'; Lescott 85'	Stadium: Bramall Lane; Attendance: 16,497 (2,483 away fans); Referee: Eddie Wolstenholme

8 September 2001 5	Preston North End	1–2	Wolverhampton Wanderers	Preston
15:00 BST	Lucketti 34'	Report	Sinton 48'; Lescott 61'	Stadium: Deepdale; Attendance: 14,381 (1,700 away fans); Referee: Phil Dowd

15 September 2001 6	Wolverhampton Wanderers	2–2	Stockport County	Wolverhampton
15:00 BST	Robinson 69'; Blake 78'	Report	Kuqi 24'; Taylor 71'	Stadium: Molineux; Attendance: 20,742 (765 away fans); Referee: Paul Taylor

18 September 2001 7	Gillingham	2–3	Wolverhampton Wanderers	Gillingham
19:45 BST	Ipoua 84'; King 90' (pen.)	Report	Blake 37'; Miller 40'; Newton 90'	Stadium: Priestfield; Attendance: 8,966 (1,466 away fans); Referee: Peter Walton

21 September 2001 8	Walsall	0–3	Wolverhampton Wanderers	Walsall
19:45 BST		Report	Kennedy 20'; Miller 22'; Newton 26'	Stadium: Bescot Stadium; Attendance: 8,327 (2,000 away fans); Referee: Graham Poll

25 September 2001 9	Wolverhampton Wanderers	1–0	Nottingham Forest	Wolverhampton
19:45 BST	Newton 90'	Report		Stadium: Molineux; Attendance: 24,350 (2,223 away fans); Referee: Chris Foy

29 September 2001 10	Rotherham United	0–3	Wolverhampton Wanderers	Rotherham
15:00 BST		Report	Cameron 18'; Kennedy 23'; Rae 87'	Stadium: Millmoor; Attendance: 8,298 (2,400 away fans); Referee: Matt Messias

13 October 2001 11	Bradford City	0–3	Wolverhampton Wanderers	Bradford
15:00 BST		Report	Proudlock 45', 76', 79'	Stadium: Valley Parade; Attendance: 16,878 (2,497 away fans); Referee: Paul Danson

16 October 2001 12	Wolverhampton Wanderers	0–1	Crewe Alexandra	Wolverhampton
19:45 BST		Report	Hulse 53'	Stadium: Molineux; Attendance: 22,569 (571 away fans); Referee: Ray Pearson

20 October 2001 13	Wolverhampton Wanderers	0–1	Crystal Palace	Wolverhampton
15:00 BST		Report	Kirovski 45'	Stadium: Molineux; Attendance: 26,471 (2,465 away fans); Referee: Steve Dunn

25 October 2001 14	West Bromwich Albion	1–1	Wolverhampton Wanderers	West Bromwich
19:45 BST	Clement 69'	Report	Blake 22'	Stadium: The Hawthorns; Attendance: 26,143 (5,186 away fans); Referee: Jeff Winter

28 October 2001 15	Wolverhampton Wanderers	3–0	Burnley	Wolverhampton
15:00 BST	Taylor 10' (o.g.); Rae 20'; Cameron 39'	Report		Stadium: Molineux; Attendance: 24,893 (1,623 away fans); Referee: Phil Joslin

31 October 2001 16	Wolverhampton Wanderers	1–0	Millwall	Wolverhampton
19:45 GMT	Rae 90'	Report		Stadium: Molineux; Attendance: 23,018 (522 away fans); Referee: Steve Baines

3 November 2001 17	Norwich City	2–0	Wolverhampton Wanderers	Norwich
15:00 GMT	Roberts 7'; McVeigh 33'	Report		Stadium: Carrow Road; Attendance: 20,335 (1,877 away fans); Referee: Paul Durkin

18 November 2001 18	Wolverhampton Wanderers	0–0	Sheffield Wednesday	Wolverhampton
14:15 GMT		Report		Stadium: Molineux; Attendance: 19,947 (833 away fans); Referee: Scott Mathieson

24 November 2001 19	Wimbledon	0–1	Wolverhampton Wanderers	London
15:00 GMT		Report	Sturridge 82'	Stadium: Selhurst Park; Attendance: 9,873 (2,688 away fans); Referee: Phil Dowd

27 November 2001 20	Wolverhampton Wanderers	4–1	Barnsley	Wolverhampton
19:45 GMT	Sturridge 9', 33', 76'; Newton 68'	Report	Barker 44'	Stadium: Molineux; Attendance: 19,231 (342 away fans); Referee: Graham Barber

2 December 2001 21	Wolverhampton Wanderers	0–1	West Bromwich Albion	Wolverhampton
13:00 GMT		Report	Jordão 56'	Stadium: Molineux; Attendance: 27,515 (3,200 away fans); Referee: George Cain

7 December 2001 22	Grimsby Town	1–1	Wolverhampton Wanderers	Cleethorpes
19:45 GMT	Jevons 2'	Report	Groves 7' (o.g.)	Stadium: Blundell Park; Attendance: 5,143 (983 away fans); Referee: Keith Hill

11 December 2001 23	Manchester City	1–0	Wolverhampton Wanderers	Manchester
19:45 GMT	Horlock 21'	Report		Stadium: Maine Road; Attendance: 33,639 (2,100 away fans); Referee: Mike Riley

16 December 2001 24	Wolverhampton Wanderers	2–1	Birmingham City	Wolverhampton
12:00 GMT	Blake 38'; Rae 66'	Report	Marcelo 40'	Stadium: Molineux; Attendance: 21,482 (2,471 away fans); Referee: Roger Furnandiz

22 December 2001 25	Watford	1–1	Wolverhampton Wanderers	Watford
15:00 GMT	Smith 26'	Report	Newton 8'	Stadium: Vicarage Road; Attendance: 17,389 (1,623 away fans); Referee: David Crick

26 December 2001 26	Wolverhampton Wanderers	2–3	Preston North End	Wolverhampton
17:15 GMT	Sturridge 19'; Blake 65'	Report	Healy 47'; Anderson 56'; Gregan 73'	Stadium: Molineux; Attendance: 24,024 (1,409 away fans); Referee: Paul Alcock

29 December 2001 27	Wolverhampton Wanderers	1–0	Sheffield United	Wolverhampton
15:00 GMT	Sturridge 45'	Report		Stadium: Molineux; Attendance: 24,138 (1,447 away fans); Referee: Peter Jones

13 January 2002 28	Wolverhampton Wanderers	3–1	Coventry City	Wolverhampton
14:15 GMT	Sturridge 50', 53'; Cameron 56'	Report	Bothroyd 90'	Stadium: Molineux; Attendance: 21,009 (1,623 away fans); Referee: Paul Durkin

17 January 2002 29	Portsmouth	2–3	Wolverhampton Wanderers	Portsmouth
19:45 GMT	Quashie 11'; Prosinečki 79'	Report	Rae 15'; Blake 61'; Sturridge 85'	Stadium: Fratton Park; Attendance: 13,105 (1,515 away fans); Referee: Mike Dean

29 January 2002 30	Barnsley	1–0	Wolverhampton Wanderers	Barnsley
19:45 GMT	Sheron 40'	Report		Stadium: Oakwell; Attendance: 13,825 (832 away fans); Referee: Graham Frankland

2 February 2002 31	Wolverhampton Wanderers	2–1	Rotherham United	Wolverhampton
15:00 GMT	Sturridge 69'; Ndah 77'	Report	Lee 43'	Stadium: Molineux; Attendance: 22,591 (905 away fans); Referee: Paul Armstrong

7 February 2002 32	Crystal Palace	0–2	Wolverhampton Wanderers	London
19:45 GMT		Report	Sturridge 13'; Newton 65'	Stadium: Selhurst Park; Attendance: 18,475 (1,392 away fans); Referee: Eddie Wolstenholme

16 February 2002 33	Wolverhampton Wanderers	3–1	Bradford City	Wolverhampton
12:00 GMT	Sturridge 76', 90' (pen.); Newton 83'	Report	Ward 31'	Stadium: Molineux; Attendance: 21,935 (684 away fans); Referee: Dermot Gallagher

20 February 2002 34	Crewe Alexandra	1–4	Wolverhampton Wanderers	Crewe
19:45 GMT	Jack 88'	Report	Blake 53', 60'; Rae 57'; Kennedy 67'	Stadium: Gresty Road; Attendance: 8,371 (2,239 away fans); Referee: Jeff Winter

23 February 2002 35	Stockport County	1–4	Wolverhampton Wanderers	Stockport
15:00 GMT	Beckett 33'	Report	Sturridge 16' (pen.), 44'; Kennedy 28', 72'	Stadium: Edgeley Park; Attendance: 8,481 (2,236 away fans); Referee: David Pugh

26 February 2002 36	Wolverhampton Wanderers	3–0	Walsall	Wolverhampton
19:45 GMT	Sturridge 54', 76'; Blake 77'	Report		Stadium: Molineux; Attendance: 27,043 (2,647 away fans); Referee: Mike Dean

2 March 2002 37	Wolverhampton Wanderers	2–0	Gillingham	Wolverhampton
15:00 GMT	Rae 26'; Blake 45'	Report		Stadium: Molineux; Attendance: 25,908 (1,032 away fans); Referee: Alan Butler

6 March 2002 38	Nottingham Forest	2–2	Wolverhampton Wanderers	Nottingham
19:45 GMT	Gray 54'; Harewood 67'	Report	Sturridge 11'; Lescott 60'	Stadium: City Ground; Attendance: 21,010 (5,000 away fans); Referee: Clive Wilkes

9 March 2002 39	Birmingham City	2–2	Wolverhampton Wanderers	Birmingham
12:00 GMT	John 36'; Devlin 45'	Report	Butler 20'; Lescott 29'	Stadium: St Andrew's; Attendance: 22,104 (2,946 away fans); Referee: Scott Mathieson

16 March 2002 40	Wolverhampton Wanderers	0–1	Grimsby Town	Wolverhampton
15:00 GMT		Report	Todd 79'	Stadium: Molineux; Attendance: 25,967 (986 away fans); Referee: Phil Richards

23 March 2002 41	Wolverhampton Wanderers	0–0	Norwich City	Wolverhampton
15:00 GMT		Report		Stadium: Molineux; Attendance: 26,280 (1,185 away fans); Referee: Michael Ryan

30 March 2002 42	Burnley	2–3	Wolverhampton Wanderers	Burnley
15:00 GMT	Moore 47'; Johnson 85'	Report	Sturridge 9', 26'; Cameron 45'	Stadium: Turf Moor; Attendance: 21,823 (4,031 away fans); Referee: Barry Knight

1 April 2002 43	Wolverhampton Wanderers	0–2	Manchester City	Wolverhampton
13:00 BST		Report	Wright-Phillips 36', 80'	Stadium: Molineux; Attendance: 28,015 (3,000 away fans); Referee: Graham Barber

5 April 2002 44	Millwall	1–0	Wolverhampton Wanderers	London
19:45 BST	Claridge 73' (pen.)	Report		Stadium: The New Den; Attendance: 17,058 (3,414 away fans); Referee: Tony Leake

14 April 2002 45	Wolverhampton Wanderers	1–0	Wimbledon	Wolverhampton
13:00 BST	Blake 23'	Report		Stadium: Molineux; Attendance: 26,920 (424 away fans); Referee: Roger Furnandiz

21 April 2002 46	Sheffield Wednesday	2–2	Wolverhampton Wanderers	Sheffield
14:00 BST	Donnelly 43'; Kuqi 53' (penalty missed) 83'	Report	Cameron 1'; Lescott 56'	Stadium: Hillsborough; Attendance: 29,772 (7,785 away fans); Referee: Paul Durkin

Final table

Pos	Team	Pld	W	D	L	GF	GA	GD	Pts
1	Manchester City	46	31	6	9	108	52	+56	99
2	West Bromwich Albion	46	27	8	11	61	29	+32	89
3	Wolverhampton Wanderers	46	25	11	10	76	43	+33	86
4	Millwall	46	22	11	13	69	48	+21	77
5	Birmingham City	46	21	13	12	70	49	+21	76
6	Norwich City	46	22	9	15	60	51	+21	75

Source: Statto.com

Results summary

Overall								Home						Away					
Pld	W	D	L	GF	GA	GD	Pts	W	D	L	GF	GA	GD	W	D	L	GF	GA	GD
46	25	11	10	76	43	+33	86	13	4	6	33	18	+15	12	7	4	43	25	+18

Source: Statto.com

Results by round

Round	1	2	3	4	5	6	7	8	9	10	11	12	13	14	15	16	17	18	19	20	21	22	23	24	25	26	27	28	29	30	31	32	33	34	35	36	37	38	39	40	41	42	43	44	45	46
Result	D	W	W	D	W	D	W	W	W	W	W	L	L	D	W	W	L	D	W	W	L	D	L	W	D	L	W	W	W	L	W	W	W	W	W	W	W	D	D	L	D	W	L	L	W	D
Position	10	6	4	6	5	8	4	2	2	1	1	1	2	1	1	1	1	2	2	1	2	2	3	3	2	3	3	2	2	2	2	2	2	1	1	1	1	1	1	2	2	2	2	2	3	3

Source: Statto.com
W = Win; D = Draw; L = Loss

=== Play-offs ===
28 April 2002 SF1	Norwich City	3–1	Wolverhampton Wanderers	Norwich
14:30 BST	Rivers 56'; McVeigh 73'; Mackay 90'	Report	Sturridge 22'	Stadium: Carrow Road; Attendance: 20,017 (2,000 away fans); Referee: Roger Furnandiz

1 May 2002 SF2	Wolverhampton Wanderers	1–0 (2–3 agg.)	Norwich City	Wolverhampton
19:45 BST	Cooper 77'	Report		Stadium: Molineux; Attendance: 27,418 (4,500 away fans); Referee: Tony Leake

=== FA Cup ===
5 January 2002 R3	Wolverhampton Wanderers	0–1	Gillingham	Wolverhampton
15:00 GMT		Report	Shaw 53'	Stadium: Molineux; Attendance: 15,271 (1,206 away fans); Referee: Mike Jones

=== League Cup ===
22 August 2001 R1	Wolverhampton Wanderers	1–2	Swindon Town	Wolverhampton
19:45 BST	Dinning 49'	Report	Howe 48'; O'Halloran 51' (pen.)	Stadium: Molineux; Attendance: 7,598 (547 away fans); Referee: Brian Curson

== Players ==
=== Statistics ===
Key:
‡ On loan from another club * First appearance(s) for the club

- # = Squad number
- Pos = Playing position
- P = Number of games played
- G = Number of goals scored
- GK = Goalkeeper
- DF = Defender
- MF = Midfielder
- FW = Forward
- = Yellow cards
- = Red cards
- † Permanent player left club during the season
- ¤ Loaned to another club for part or all of season

Correct as of the season's end. Starting appearances are listed first, followed by substitute appearances in parentheses where applicable.

No.	Pos	Name	P	G	P	G	P	G	P	G	A yellow card	A red card	Notes
No.	Pos	Name	League		FA Cup		League Cup		Total		Discipline		Notes
1	GK	(England) Michael Oakes	48	0	1	0	1	0	50	0	0	0	
2	DF	(Australia) Kevin Muscat	37	0	1	0	0	0	38	0	4	1	
3	DF	(England) Lee Naylor	26(1)	0	0	0	0	0	26(1)	0	3	0	
4	MF	(Wales) Carl Robinson	15(8)	2	0	0	1	0	16(8)	2	1	0	
5	DF	(England) Joleon Lescott	46	5	0	0	0	0	46	5	4	1	
6	DF	(Republic of Ireland) Paul Butler	45	1	1	0	1	0	47	1	8	1	
7	FW	(England) Michael Branch ¤	5(2)	0	0	0	0	0	5(2)	0	1	0	
8	MF	(Republic of Ireland) Keith Andrews	4(7)	0	0	0	0	0	4(7)	0	2	0	
9	FW	(England) Adam Proudlock ¤	12(8)	3	0	0	1	0	13(8)	3	2	0	
10	FW	(Georgia (country)) Temuri Ketsbaia †	0(2)	0	0	0	1	0	1(2)	0	0	0	
10	MF	(England) Kevin Cooper	6(1)	1	0	0	0	0	6(1)	1	2	0	
11	MF	(Republic of Ireland) Mark Kennedy	35(1)	5	1	0	1	0	37(1)	5	2	0	
12	GK	(England) Stephen Bywater ‡	0	0	0	0	0	0	0	0	0	0	
12	GK	(England) Marlon Beresford ‡	0	0	0	0	0	0	0	0	0	0	
13	GK	(Australia) Danny Milosevic ‡	0	0	0	0	0	0	0	0	0	0	
14	FW	(Nigeria) George Ndah	1(14)	1	0	0	0	0	1(14)	1	0	0	
15	FW	(Belgium) Cédric Roussel	6(11)	2	0(1)	0	0(1)	0	6(13)	2	1	0	
16	MF	(England) Andy Sinton	3(4)	1	0	0	0(1)	0	3(5)	1	1	0	
17	FW	(England) Robert Taylor ¤ †	0	0	0	0	0	0	0	0	0	0	
18	DF	(England) Sean Connelly	5(3)	0	0	0	1	0	6(3)	0	0	0	
20	MF	(England) Shaun Newton	47	8	1	0	1	0	49	8	8	0	
21	MF	(Scotland) Colin Cameron	40(3)	5	1	0	0	0	41(3)	5	7	0	
22	FW	(Republic of Ireland) Colin Larkin ¤	0	0	0	0	0	0	0	0	0	0	
23	DF	(France) Ludovic Pollet	5(3)	0	1	0	1	0	7(3)	0	0	0	
24	MF	(England) Tony Dinning ¤ †	4	0	0	0	1	1	5	1	0	0	
24	MF	(Scotland) Alex Rae	33(5)	7	1	0	0	0	34(5)	7	10	0	
25	DF	(Guinea) Mo Camara	25(4)	0	1	0	1	0	27(4)	0	7	0	
26	FW	(Scotland) Kenny Miller ‡	5(17)	2	0(1)	0	0	0	5(18)	2	1	0	
27	FW	(Wales) Nathan Blake	40(1)	11	1	0	0	0	41(1)	11	7	0	
28	MF	(England) Shane Tudor ¤ †	0	0	0	0	0	0	0	0	0	0	
28	DF	(Denmark) Jacob Laursen ‡	0	0	0	0	0	0	0	0	0	0	
29	DF	(Wales) Ryan Green †	0	0	0	0	0	0	0	0	0	0	
29	FW	(England) Dean Sturridge ‡	29	21	1	0	0	0	30	21	5	0	
30	GK	(England) Matt Murray	0	0	0	0	0	0	0	0	0	0	
31	DF	(Norway) Gunnar Halle ‡	6(1)	0	0	0	0	0	6(1)	0	0	0	
32	MF	(Republic of Ireland) John Melligan ¤	0	0	0	0	0	0	0	0	0	0	
41	GK	(England) Lewis Solly	0	0	0	0	0	0	0	0	0	0	

=== Awards ===
Award	Winner
Fans' Player of the Season	Alex Rae
Young Player of the Season	Joleon Lescott

== Transfers ==
=== In ===
Date	Player	From	Fee
4 July 2001	(Republic of Ireland) Mark Kennedy	Manchester City	£2 million
7 August 2001	(England) Shaun Newton	Charlton Athletic	£850,000
24 August 2001	(Scotland) Colin Cameron	(Scotland) Hearts	£1.75 million
13 September 2001	(Wales) Nathan Blake	Blackburn Rovers	£1.5 million
19 September 2001	(Scotland) Alex Rae	Sunderland	£1.2 million
13 December 2001	(Scotland) Kenny Miller	(Scotland) Rangers	£3 million
24 December 2001	(England) Dean Sturridge	Leicester City	£350,000
27 March 2002	(England) Kevin Cooper	Wimbledon	£1 million

=== Out ===
Date	Player	To	Fee
June 2001	(Republic of Ireland) Seamus Crowe	Released	Free
June 2001	(Norway) Håvard Flo	Released	Free
June 2001	(Northern Ireland) Aaron Kerr	Released	Free
June 2001	(Germany) Robert Niestroj	Released	Free
June 2001	(England) Mike Stowell	Released	Free
June 2001	(England) Scott Taylor	Released	Free
11 July 2001	(England) Neil Emblen	Norwich City	£500,000
10 September 2001	(England) Tony Dinning	Wigan Athletic	£750,000
18 October 2001	(Georgia (country)) Temuri Ketsbaia	(Scotland) Dundee	£500,000
19 October 2001	(Wales) Ryan Green	Millwall	Free
21 November 2001	(England) Shane Tudor	Cambridge United	Free
28 March 2002	(England) Robert Taylor	Released	Free

=== Loans in ===
Start date	Player	From	End date
14 July 2001	(England) Stephen Bywater	West Ham United	16 August 2001
18 August 2001	(England) Marlon Beresford	Middlesbrough	18 September 2001
7 September 2001	(Scotland) Kenny Miller	Rangers	6 December 2001
23 November 2001	(England) Dean Sturridge	Leicester City	23 December 2001
21 December 2001	(Australia) Danny Milosevic	Leeds United	28 December 2001
27 March 2002	(Denmark) Jacob Laursen	Leicester City	End of season
28 March 2002	(Norway) Gunnar Halle	Bradford City	End of season

=== Loans out ===
Start date	Player	To	End date
29 August 2001	(England) Robert Taylor	Queens Park Rangers	26 September 2001
7 September 2001	(England) Tony Dinning	Wigan Athletic	10 September 2001
13 September 2001	(Republic of Ireland) Colin Larkin	Kidderminster Harriers	End of season
9 October 2001	(England) Robert Taylor	Gillingham	3 January 2002
24 October 2001	(England) Shane Tudor	Cambridge United	24 November 2001
29 November 2001	(Republic of Ireland) John Melligan	Bournemouth	9 February 2002
17 January 2002	(England) Robert Taylor	Grimsby Town	17 February 2002
19 March 2002	(England) Adam Proudlock	Nottingham Forest	16 April 2002
21 March 2002	(England) Michael Branch	Reading	End of season

== Management and coaching staff ==
Position	Name
Manager	Dave Jones
Assistant manager	John Ward
Reserve team coach	Terry Connor
Academy director	Chris Evans
Under-19s coach	John Perkins
Under-17s coach	Keith Downing
Chief scout	George Foster
Club doctor	Dr Peter Ackroyd
Club physio	Barry Holmes

== Kit ==
The season retained the home kit from the previous year; a darker "old gold" style shirt with black shorts. A new away kit, however, was launched: an all-silver design with blue trims; their previous light blue away kit became a third choice strip. All were manufactured by WWFC, the club's own label, and sponsored by Goodyear (for a twelfth and final year).
