= Matt Murray (English footballer) =

English footballer

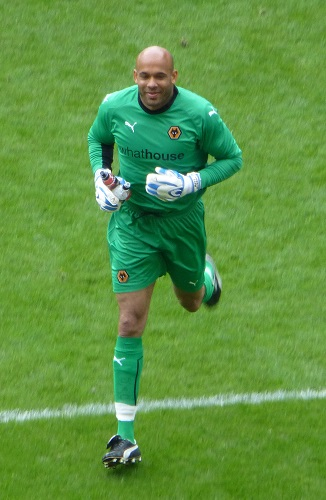
- Murray in 2014

Personal information
- Full name: Matthew William Murray
- Date of birth: 2 May 1981 (age 45)
- Place of birth: Solihull, England
- Height: 6 ft 5 in (1.96 m)
- Position: Goalkeeper

Youth career
- 1990–1998: Wolverhampton Wanderers

Senior career*
Years	Team	Apps	(Gls)
1998–2010	Wolverhampton Wanderers	87	(0)
2000	→ Slough Town (loan)	2	(0)
2000	→ Kingstonian (loan)	1	(0)
2006	→ Tranmere Rovers (loan)	2	(0)
2008	→ Hereford United (loan)	3	(0)
Total		95	(0)

International career
2003–2005	England U21	5	(0)
- * Club domestic league appearances and goals

Matthew William Murray (born 2 May 1981) is an English former professional footballer, sports reporter and pundit.

As a player he was a football goalkeeper who spent his entire career at Wolverhampton Wanderers, making 100 appearances for the club in all competitions, including one in the Premier League. During his twelve-year spell with the club he spent time on loan with Slough Town, Kingstonian, Tranmere Rovers, Hereford United. He was capped five times by England U21 before 2003 and 2005.

His career was curtailed by numerous injuries, and he retired at the age of 29. Since retiring, Murray has worked as a match reporter and in-studio summariser for Sky Sports News, and was the goalkeeping coach at the Nike Academy.

== Career ==
Born in Solihull, Murray progressed through Wolves academy system to sign professional forms in 1998. The five-year contract he was given, aged 17, is the longest in the club's history for an academy graduate.

However, his career failed to find its stride immediately as he was largely out of contention through injury. He suffered a cruciate knee injury just twenty minutes into a loan spell at non-league Kingstonian in October 2000 where he made his first professional appearance.

He was promoted into Wolves' first team on 31 August 2002 against Wimbledon, deputising for the injured Michael Oakes and then kept his place through that season. The season ended with him producing a man-of-the-match performance in the Play-off final against Sheffield United on 26 May 2003. He produced a number of vital saves to help the club win 3–0 and gain promotion to the Premier League, the pick being a second-half penalty save from Michael Brown.

On 16 August 2003, Murray made his only Premier League appearance as Wolves began the campaign with a 5–1 loss at Blackburn Rovers. He suffered an injury in that match, and Oakes then took his place in the team. He followed this up by debuting for England Under-21s, against Slovakia U21, the first of five under-21 caps. However, a back problem then a foot fracture wrecked this season. In the three years that followed the success of 2002–03, he only played five games for Wolves due to a variety of injuries.

The goalkeeper next played in January 2005 but soon suffered another break to his foot, ruling him out for a further year. By March 2006 he was fit enough to be sent on loan to Tranmere Rovers, but was called back to Wolves within a month because of possible injuries to other goalkeepers.

He started his first game for Wolves in almost 16 months on the final day of the season at Norwich City and managed to retain his place at the beginning of the 2006–07 season, where he was largely accredited with Wolves' impressive start to the season, due to a catalogue of good performances allowing for five of their first seven games to end 1–0.

His performances were given further recognition as he won the PFA Championship Player of the Month award in December 2006 and as the campaign ended, he was named in the Championship Team of the Year at the 2006–07 PFA Awards dinner and also voted the PFA Fans' Player of the Year for the division. He was also voted Wolves' Player of the Season as they reached the play-offs. The season ended on a sour note though as he broke his shoulder on the eve of his club's vital play-off game against local rivals West Bromwich Albion.

After spending the summer recuperating from his shoulder injury, he suffered another setback from a cruciate (left) knee injury in pre-season training. He underwent two operations for this and missed the whole of the 2007–08 campaign while undergoing rehabilitation with the aim of returning for the new season. However, inflammation in his knee then delayed his comeback further still. By the time he recovered, fellow academy graduate Wayne Hennessey had established himself as first choice.

In November 2008, he joined League One Hereford United on loan, but only played two full games before injury again struck suffering a ruptured patella tendon in his right knee during a match against MK Dons. In November 2009 Murray started his first game back for Wolves playing in a reserve game, but he felt discomfort in his knee and was substituted after just 23 minutes. This was to prove his last appearance in a Wolves shirt.

He announced his playing retirement on 26 August 2010 aged 29. In total he made 100 appearances for Wolves in all competitions.

On 26 September 2010, at half-time in a match between Wolves and Aston Villa, he gave a speech to the crowd, announcing his retirement and thanking the fans.

== Personal life ==
Murray was born in England to a Nigerian father and English mother, and was adopted from birth by a white couple.

== Career statistics ==
Appearances and goals by club, season and competition
Club	Season	League			FA Cup		League Cup		Other		Total	
Club	Season	Division	Apps	Goals	Apps	Goals	Apps	Goals	Apps	Goals	Apps	Goals
Wolverhampton Wanderers	1997–98	First Division	0	0	0	0	0	0	―		0	0
Wolverhampton Wanderers	1998–99	First Division	0	0	0	0	0	0	―		0	0
Wolverhampton Wanderers	2000–01	First Division	0	0	0	0	0	0	―		0	0
Wolverhampton Wanderers	2001–02	First Division	0	0	0	0	0	0	0	0	0	0
Wolverhampton Wanderers	2002–03	First Division	40	0	4	0	1	0	3 (Note: Appearances in First Division play-offs)	0	48	0
Wolverhampton Wanderers	2003–04	Premier League	1	0	0	0	1	0	―		2	0
Wolverhampton Wanderers	2004–05	Championship	1	0	1	0	0	0	―		2	0
Wolverhampton Wanderers	2005–06	Championship	1	0	0	0	0	0	―		1	0
Wolverhampton Wanderers	2006–07	Championship	44	0	3	0	0	0	0	0	47	0
Wolverhampton Wanderers	2008–09	Championship	0	0	0	0	0	0	―		0	0
Wolverhampton Wanderers	Total		87	0	8	0	2	0	3	0	100	0
Slough Town (loan)	2000–01	Isthmian League Premier Division	2	0	―		―		1 (Note: Appearance in Isthmian League Cup)	0	3	0
Kingstonian (loan)	2000–01	Conference	1	0	―		―		―		1	0
Tranmere Rovers (loan)	2005–06	League One	2	0	―		―		―		2	0
Hereford United (loan)	2008–09	League One	3	0	0	0	―		―		3	0
Career total			95	0	8	0	2	0	4	0	109	0

== Honours ==
Wolverhampton Wanderers

- Football League First Division play-offs: 2003

Individual

- Football League Championship Golden Glove: 2006–07
- PFA Championship Fans' Player of the Year: 2006–07
- PFA Championship Player of the Month: December 2006
- PFA Championship Team of the Year: 2006–07
- Wolverhampton Wanderers Player of the Year: 2006–07
- Wolverhampton Wanderers Young Player of the Year: 2002–03
