= Martyn Naylor =

English footballer

Personal information
- Full name: Martyn Paul Naylor
- Date of birth: 2 August 1977 (age 49)
- Place of birth: Walsall, England
- Position: Defender

Team information
- Current team: Leamington

Senior career*
Years	Team	Apps	(Gls)
1995–1996	Hereford United	0	(0)
1996–1997	Telford United		
1997–1999	Shrewsbury Town	2	(0)
1998–1999	→ Telford United (loan)		
1999–2000	Telford United	20	(1)
2000–2001	Greenock Morton	8	(0)
2001–2002	Bilston Town		
2002–2008	The New Saints	118	(13)
2008–2009	AFC Telford United		
2009–2010	Rhyl	21	(0)
2010–2011	AFC Telford United		
2011–2012	Worcester City		
2012	Rushall Olympic		
2012–	Leamington		
- * Club domestic league appearances and goals as of 13:27, 4 May 2010 (UTC)

Martyn Paul Naylor (born 2 August 1977) is an English former footballer. He was a wing back who is assistant manager for National League North side Leamington in England.

== Career ==
Naylor began his career with Hereford United, but left to join Telford United on a free transfer in August 1996 without making a first team appearance. In August 1997, he joined Shrewsbury Town, making his league debut on 9 August 1997 in the 2–1 win at home to Doncaster Rovers. Later that month, he also played in the League Cup defeat at home to Brentford and kept his place for the following league game away to Cambridge United. Town lost 4–3 and Naylor was sent off. He did not play for Shrewsbury again.

In September 1998, he rejoined Telford United on loan, moving on a free transfer the following January. He remained with Telford until July 2000, when he joined Scottish side Greenock Morton. He played nine times for Morton before returning to England in 2001 with Bilston Town.

In 2002, Naylor joined The New Saints (then named Total Network Solutions) and was a regular member of their title-winning sides. He was released from his contract at the end of the 2005–06 season, but was retained as a non-contract player with the Saints after an unsuccessful trial with Kidderminster Harriers. He went on to make 15 Welsh Premier League appearances in the 2006–07 season and remained with the Saints for the 2007–08 season.

He returned to Telford in 2008.

His brother Lee is also a professional footballer.

When Telford beat Kettering 1–0 in the FA Trophy on 31 January 2009, Martyn fractured his cheek bone in a collision with teammate Lee Vaughan.

In September 2011 it was announced he was registered with Worcester City but was playing for nothing as the club had spent its budget on players. He left the club in January 2012.

He joined Leamington on an initially short-term deal in October 2012. However, he was still at this club at the end of the 2023/24 as assistant manager.
