= 2003 Football League First Division play-off final =

Association football match in Cardiff, UK

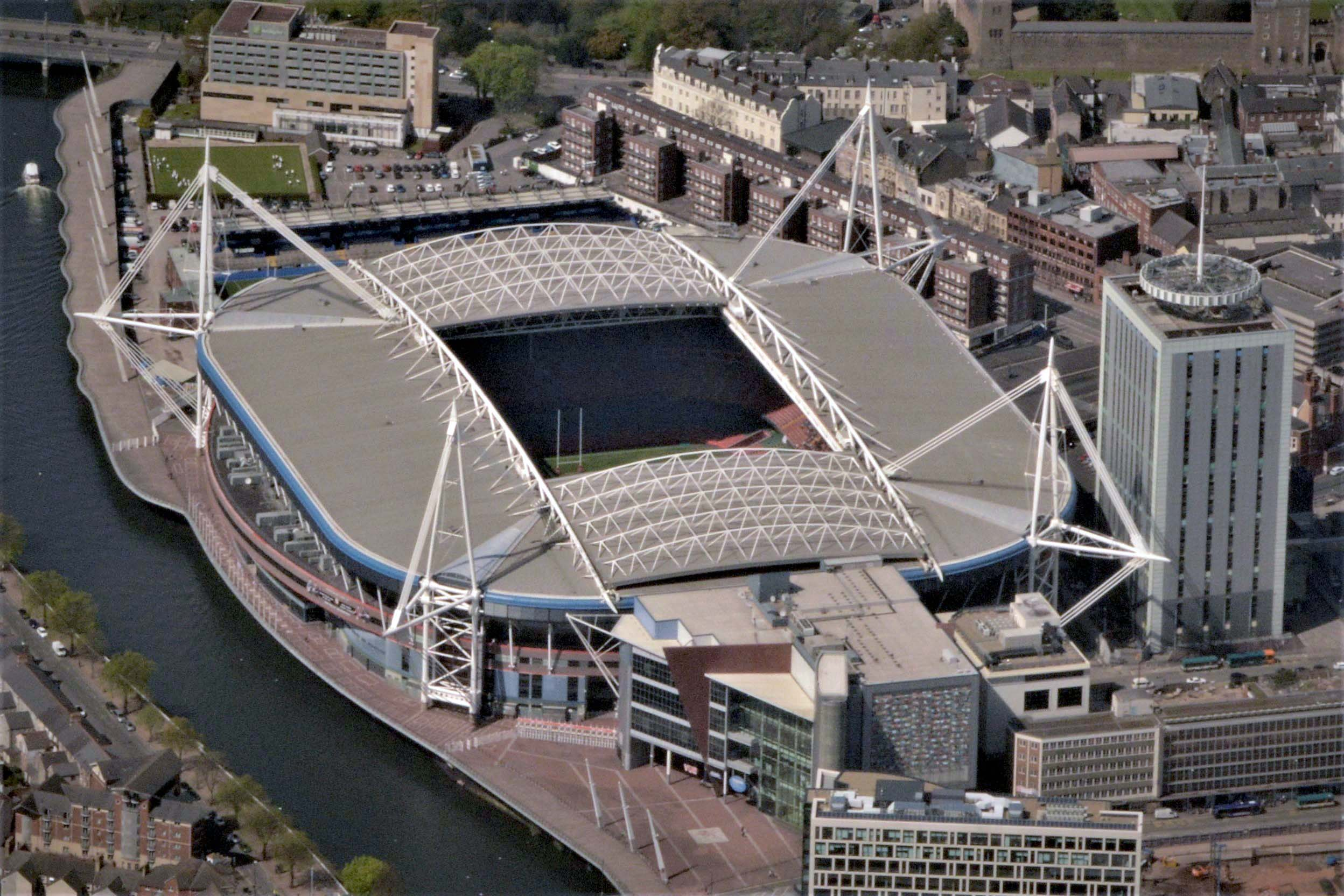
- The match was played at the Millennium Stadium in Cardiff.
Sheffield United	Wolverhampton Wanderers
0	3
- Date: 26 May 2003
- Venue: Millennium Stadium, Cardiff
- Man of the Match: Matt Murray (Wolverhampton Wanderers)
- Referee: Steve Bennett (Kent)
- Attendance: 69,473

The 2003 Football League First Division play-off final was an association football match which was played on 26 May 2003 at the Millennium Stadium, Cardiff, between Sheffield United and Wolverhampton Wanderers. The match was to determine the third and final team to gain promotion from the Football League First Division, the second tier of English football, to the FA Premier League. The top two teams of the 2002–03 Football League First Division season gained automatic promotion to the Premier League, while the clubs placed from third to sixth place in the table took part in play-off semi-finals; Sheffield United ended the season in third position while Wolverhampton Wanderers finished fifth. The winners of these semi-finals competed for the final place for the 2003–04 season in the Premier League. Reading and Nottingham Forest were the losing semi-finalists.

The 2003 final was played in front of a crowd of 69,473 and was refereed by Steve Bennett. Mark Kennedy opened the scoring for Wolves after six minutes with a shot from distance. They doubled their lead in the 22nd minute when Nathan Blake headed in a corner from Kenny Miller. Just before half-time, Miller made it 3–0 after converting a cross from Miller. At half-time, Neil Warnock, the Sheffield United manager, was sent off for repeatedly complaining about the performance of the referee. His side was awarded a penalty early in the second half, but Wolves goalkeeper Matt Murray saved Michael Brown's strike. Wolves won the match 3–0, taking them back to the top flight for the first time in nearly 20 years. Murray was named man of the match.

Wolves ended the next season bottom of the Premier League and were relegated back to the second tier of English football for the 2004–05 season. Sheffield United ended their following season in eighth place in the First Division, missing out on the play-offs by two points.

== Route to the final ==
Football League Championship final table, leading positions
Pos	Team	Pld	W	D	L	GF	GA	GD	Pts
1	Portsmouth	46	29	11	6	97	45	+52	98
2	Leicester City	46	26	14	6	73	40	+33	92
3	Sheffield United	46	23	11	12	72	52	+20	80
4	Reading	46	25	4	17	61	46	+15	79
5	Wolverhampton Wanderers	46	20	16	10	81	44	+37	76
6	Nottingham Forest	46	20	14	12	82	50	+32	74

Sheffield United finished the regular 2002–03 season in third place in the Football League First Division, the second tier of the English football league system, two places and two points ahead of Wolverhampton Wanderers. Both therefore missed out on the two automatic places for promotion to the Premier League and instead took part in the play-offs, along with Reading and Nottingham Forest, to determine the third promoted team. Sheffield United finished twelve points behind Leicester City (who were promoted in second place) and eighteen behind league winners Portsmouth. Sheffield United had also reached the semi-finals of both the FA Cup and League Cup.

Wolves faced Reading in their play-off semi-final and the first leg was played at the Molineux Stadium in Wolverhampton on 10 May 2003. Midway through the first half, the visitors took the lead with Nicky Forster converting a cross from Nicky Shorey. Shaun Newton, a second-half substitute for Wolves, then struck a shot past Marcus Hahnemann in the Reading goal to level the match. With six minutes remaining, Wolves took the lead with a free kick from Lee Naylor, and the match ended 2–1. The second leg was played four days later at the Madejski Stadium in Reading. After a goalless first half, Alex Rae who had come as a second half substitute, scored with a shot from around 15 yards (14 m), giving Wolves a 1–0 win and a 3–1 aggregate victory.

Sheffield United's opponents for their play-off semi-final were Nottingham Forest, with the first leg taking place at the City Ground in Nottingham on 10 May 2003. In the first half, Marlon Harewood hit the bar for Forest while Carl Asaba miskicked to miss an open goal, and both teams went into the break goalless. Ten minutes into the second half, David Johnson latched onto a deflected pass from Andy Reid and scored past Paddy Kenny to put the home team ahead. Within two minutes, the score was level: Michael Brown was fouled by Matthieu Louis-Jean and the former scored the subsequent penalty to make it 1–1. Late in the match, Michael Dawson was sent off for a foul on Steve Kabba, making him unavailable for the second leg. The second leg took place five days later at Bramall Lane in Sheffield. Johnson opened the scoring after half an hour following a defensive error by John Curtis. Reid then doubled Forest's lead in the 58th minute with a volley, but Sheffield United responded almost immediately with Brown scoring with a deflection off Forest defender Des Walker. Kabba then equalised eight minutes later with a strike from around 15 yards (14 m). The match ended 2–2 and went into extra time. Paul Peschisolido scored for Sheffield United with eight minutes remaining before Des Walker's own goal made it 4–2. Despite a Rob Page own goal with a minute remaining, the match ended 4–3 and Sheffield United progressed to the final with a 5–4 aggregate victory.

== Match ==
=== Background ===
This was Sheffield United's second appearance in the second tier play-off final, having lost the 1997 Football League First Division play-off final 1–0 to Crystal Palace. Wolves were making their fourth appearance in the play-offs but this was the first time they had progressed beyond the semi-final. Brown was Sheffield United's top scorer with 16 league goals during the regular season, while Kenny Miller was Wolves' leading marksman with 19. Wolves had last played in the top tier of English football in the 1983–84 season when they were relegated, finishing bottom of the division, 12 points adrift of Notts County above them. Sheffield United had played in the second tier since being relegated from the Premier League in the 1993–94 season.

Before the match, Wolves manager Dave Jones spoke of the speculation over his position: "I try not to read anything in the papers which is about myself because if I read everything about what everybody thinks of me I'd end up going mad ... I've been likened to a murderer in Coronation Street and then someone out of Brookside ... We have one game to go now and if it does not happen for us then an awful lot is going to be written about me and the club". His chairman, Jack Hayward, had owned the club for 13 years without promotion and suggested he would consider his position should Wolves not be promoted this time. Denis Irwin, Wolves' 38-year-old defender, suggested that even if his side won promotion, he would possibly retire rather than participate in the Premier League: "I'm not getting any younger and I wouldn't want to be in the Premiership if I didn't feel I could do myself justice". Kenny, Sheffield United's goalkeeper and player of the year, was determined to stake a claim for an international call-up for the Republic of Ireland national football team, and suggested that Premier League football would be beneficial: "If I was playing regular Premiership football next season, it do my chances of an Ireland call-up no harm".

In their first meeting of the regular season Sheffield United had won 3–1 at Molineux in October 2002. The return game was the sides' penultimate league match of the season and ended in a 3–3 draw at Bramall Lane. The referee for the final was Steve Bennett representing the Kent County Football Association. Winning the final was estimated by the BBC to be worth up to £15–20 million to the successful team. It was the third time the second tier play-off final was hosted by the Millennium Stadium in Cardiff. George Ndah was expected to be available for selection for Wolves, after suffering a knee injury, while Sheffield United's Stuart McCall had recovered from an ankle injury. Dean Windass was omitted from the United squad and opted not to travel with the team to the Millennium Stadium. Bookmakers were unable to choose a clear favourite, suggesting either team were equally likely to win the match. The match was broadcast live in the UK on Sky Sports.

=== Summary ===
The match kicked off at 3 p.m. on 26 May 2003 in front of a Millennium Stadium crowd of 69,473. After four minutes, Nathan Blake dragged his shot wide of the Sheffield United goal. Two minutes later, Mark Kennedy opened the scoring for Wolves with a low drive into the corner of the net from 20 yards (18 m) after receiving a pass from Miller. In the 12th minute, Kenny caught a back-header from Phil Jagielka just ahead of Blake. Peter Ndlovu's strike for Sheffield United on 17 minutes went wide of the Wolves goal and despite United having more possession, Wolves doubled their lead in the 22nd minute: Colin Cameron's shot was deflected behind by Kenny, and Blake headed in from close range from the resulting Miller corner. In the 36th minute, a cross from Curtis found Ndlovu in the Wolves penalty area, but Joleon Lescott cleared the danger. Three minutes later, Matt Murray was forced to make a save to prevent Paul Ince scoring an own goal. Irwin was then booked for a foul on Ndlovu, before Wolves established a three-goal lead shortly before the half time interval when Miller converted a cross from Newton.

The Sheffield United manager Neil Warnock was sent to the stands at half time after repeatedly criticising the referee. United made the first substitution of the game at the start of the second half, with McCall coming on to replace Mark Rankine. A minute later, Bennett awarded United a penalty after adjudging that Wolves' defender Paul Butler had handled the ball. However, Brown's spotkick was pushed away by goalkeeper Murray. Despite having the majority of the possession, United were unable to score and in the 64th minute made their second change of the afternoon with Ndlovu being replaced by Peschisolido. Murray saved a Peschisolido header before pushing a Michael Tonge free kick onto the post, the rebound being struck over the bar by Page. United made their final substitution of the game in the 74th minute, with Wayne Allison coming on to replace Asaba. A minute later, Wolves made their first change of the afternoon, with Dean Sturridge replacing Miller. Tonge and then Brown were both shown a yellow card and in the 88th minute, Wolves' Adam Proudlock was brought on in place of Blake. No further goals were scored as the match ended 3–0 to Wolves who secured their place in the top tier of English football for the first time in almost 20 years.

=== Details ===
26 May 2003
15:00 BST

Sheffield United	0–3	Wolverhampton Wanderers
	Report	Kennedy 6'; Blake 22'; Miller 45'

Millennium Stadium, Cardiff
Attendance: 69,473
Referee: Steve Bennett (Kent)

Sheffield United	Wolverhampton Wanderers

GK	23	(Republic of Ireland) Paddy Kenny
RB	36	(England) John Curtis
CB	6	(Wales) Rob Page (c)
CB	17	(England) Phil Jagielka
LB	2	(England) Rob Kozluk
RM	16	(Zimbabwe) Peter Ndlovu		(substituted off) 64'
CM	7	(England) Michael Brown	(yellow card) 79'
CM	26	(England) Mark Rankine		(substituted off) 46'
LM	18	(England) Michael Tonge	(yellow card) 77'
CF	9	(England) Carl Asaba
CF	34	(England) Steve Kabba		(substituted off) 74'
Substitutes:
GK	24	(Republic of Ireland) Gary Kelly
MF	8	(Scotland) Stuart McCall		(substituted on) 46'
MF	10	(Canada) Paul Peschisolido		(substituted on) 64'
MF	12	(Scotland) Nick Montgomery
FW	14	(England) Wayne Allison		(substituted on) 74'
Manager:
(England) Neil Warnock				(red card) 45'

GK	13	(England) Matt Murray
RB	8	(Republic of Ireland) Denis Irwin	(yellow card) 44'
CB	5	(England) Joleon Lescott
CB	6	(Republic of Ireland) Paul Butler
LB	3	(England) Lee Naylor
RM	7	(England) Shaun Newton
CM	10	(Scotland) Colin Cameron
CM	23	(England) Paul Ince (c)
LM	11	(Republic of Ireland) Mark Kennedy
CF	16	(Scotland) Kenny Miller		(substituted off) 75'
CF	9	(Wales) Nathan Blake		(substituted off) 88'
Substitutes:
GK	1	(England) Michael Oakes
DF	24	(England) Marc Edworthy
MF	4	(Scotland) Alex Rae
FW	12	(England) Adam Proudlock		(substituted on) 88'
FW	29	(England) Dean Sturridge		(substituted on) 75'
Manager:
(England) Dave Jones

== Post-match ==
The Wolves' chairman Hayward said "it was the proudest moment of his life" and that "it's a dream come true. They played terrific". Winning manager Jones noted: "When you see the support we get it is absolutely magnificent. We were superb in the first half attacking-wise and finishing and in the second half we defended well". He went on to say: "I was very proud to lead them out. I just wish I could've worn a kit and played in it, that was the only thing that was missing". His counterpart, Warnock, was gracious in defeat and praised the performance of his opposition: "Wolves were worthy winners ... We did not do the things we done all season, but I don't want to take anything from Wolves". Reluctant to discuss the details of his dismissal at half time, he noted: "The referee asked me to go upstairs, but you will have to ask him about it." He later described the aftermath of his sending-off, saying it was "pretty horrific, I didn't want to socialise. Then when the chairman asked me to say a few words to the team, I had nowt to say".

Murray, the Wolves goalkeeper, was named as man of the match. The match was inducted into the Wolverhampton Wanderers F.C. Hall of Fame in 2011 as "a way of recognising an occasion that will forever live in the memories of Wolves fans, whether they were at the Millennium Stadium in Cardiff or watched the game against Sheffield United on TV". Winning the final was later estimated by Deloitte to be worth £40 million to Wolves when comparing their First Division matchday, commercial and broadcasting income to that in their following season in the Premier League.

Wolves ended the next season bottom of the Premier League, six points from safety, and were relegated back to the second tier of English football for the 2004–05 season. Sheffield United ended their following season in eighth place in the First Division, two points outside the play-offs.
