= Kenny Coleman =

Irish former footballer

Personal information
- Full name: Kenneth James Coleman
- Date of birth: 20 September 1982 (age 44)
- Place of birth: Cork, Ireland
- Height: 6 ft 0 in (1.83 m)
- Position: Defender

Youth career
- ?–2000: Wolverhampton Wanderers

Senior career*
Years	Team	Apps	(Gls)
2000–2003	Wolverhampton Wanderers	0	(0)
2002–2003	→ Kidderminster Harriers (loan)	15	(0)
2003–2004	Kidderminster Harriers	10	(0)
- Waterford United
2005–2009	Cobh Ramblers		
Total		25+	(0+)
- * Club domestic league appearances and goals

Kenneth James Coleman (born 20 September 1982) is an Irish former footballer who played in the Football League for Wolverhampton Wanderers, and Kidderminster Harriers.
