= Graham Ward (footballer) =

Irish footballer

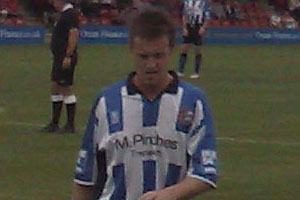

Personal information
- Date of birth: 25 February 1983 (age 43)
- Place of birth: Dublin, Ireland
- Position: Right back

Youth career
- 2002–2003: Wolverhampton Wanderers

Senior career*
Years	Team	Apps	(Gls)
2003–2004	Kidderminster Harriers	21	(0)
2004–2005	Cheltenham Town	2	(0)
2005	→ Burton Albion (loan)	4	(1)
2005–2006	Tamworth	40	(2)
2006	→ Worcester City (loan)		
2006–2011	Worcester City		
2011–201?	Nuneaton Town		

International career
1999–2000	Republic of Ireland U16	7	(1)
2002–2003	Republic of Ireland U20		

Managerial career
- 2020: AFC Bridgnorth
- * Club domestic league appearances and goals

Graham Ward (born 25 February 1983) is an Irish former professional footballer who played as a defender.

== Playing career ==
Ward played his youth football with St Josephs Boys AFC football club based in south Dublin.

=== Wolverhampton Wanderers ===
Ward began his career as a trainee with Wolverhampton Wanderers in 2002, despite being the Republic of Ireland Under 20s captain, he failed to land himself a place in the first team.

With the club reaching the Premiership, Ward was released by manager Dave Jones.

=== Kidderminster Harriers ===
Ward moved to Kidderminster Harriers just prior to the start of the 2003–04 season on a one-year contract. Ward was part of the side that made the 3rd round of the FA cup before losing to the club that released him the season before. He produced a man of the match display during the replay at Molineux.

During his time with Kidderminster Harriers, Ward made 21 appearances, but failed to find the net during this time. He also became KHFC first ever International Player representing Ireland at the World Cup in Dubai at Under 20 level.

=== Cheltenham Town ===
On 1 August 2004, Ward joined Cheltenham Town. His time with the club again only lasted one season playing just two games. He spent the latter part on loan with Burton Albion where he played three games and scored one goal the first of his professional career.

=== Tamworth ===
On 13 May 2005, Ward joined Conference National club Tamworth, where he teamed up with former Cheltenham Town teammate Bob Taylor. Ward was part of the team that made the third round of the FA cup where he scored in the 1st round and beat AFC Bournemouth, and Hartlepool before losing to Championship side Stoke on Penalties. Ward played every game during the 2005 season.

=== Worcester City ===
On 27 November 2006, Ward joined Worcester City after spending time with the club previously on loan. ward made over 200 appearances for the club before leaving to join Nuneaton town,

Ward Joined Nuneaton but struggled with two knee injuries during his time. Ward made over 20 appearances and was eventually promoted to the conference before calling time on his career at the age of 28 after medial advice.

=== International career ===
Ward represented the Republic of Ireland Under-16 team at the 2000 UEFA European Under-16 Football Championship, the Under-19 team at the 2002 UEFA European Under-19 Football Championship and at the 2003 FIFA World Youth Championship. He also has 3 Under 21 International caps.

== Coaching career ==
After spells as assistant manager at AFC Bridgnorth and Wolverhampton Sporting, Ward was appointed manager of AFC Bridgnorth in May 2020. However, he left the club in October the same year.
