= 2003 Football League play-offs =

Football League play-offs
- Season: 2002–03
- Champions: Wolverhampton Wanderers (First Division); Cardiff City (Second Division); Bournemouth (Third Division)
- Matches played: 15
- Goals scored: 41 (2.73 per match)
- Biggest home win: Lincoln 5–3 Scunthorpe (Third Division)
- Biggest away win: Reading 0–1 Wolves (First Division); Scunthorpe 0–1 Lincoln (Third Division)
- Highest scoring: Lincoln 5–3 Scunthorpe (8 goals)
- Highest attendance: 69,473 – Sheffield United v Wolves (First Division final)
- Lowest attendance: 5,782 – Bury v Bournemouth (Third Division semi-final)
- Average attendance: 24,964

The Football League play-offs for the 2002–03 season were held in May 2003, with the finals taking place at Millennium Stadium in Cardiff. The play-off semi-finals will be played over two legs and will be contested by the teams who finish in 3rd, 4th, 5th and 6th place in the Football League First Division and Football League Second Division and the 4th, 5th, 6th and 7th placed teams in the Football League Third Division table. The winners of the semi-finals will go through to the finals, with the winner of the matches gaining promotion for the following season.

== Background ==
The Football League play-offs have been held every year since 1987. They take place for each division following the conclusion of the regular season and are contested by the four clubs finishing below the automatic promotion places.

In the First Division, Sheffield United, who are aiming to return to the top flight for the first time since 1994, finished 12 points behind second placed Leicester City, who in turn finished 6 points behind champions Portsmouth, who returned to the top flight for the first time since 1988. Reading who are aiming for a place in the top flight for the first time in their history, finished in fourth place in the table. Wolverhampton Wanderers, who are aiming to return to the top flight after nearly 20 years outside the top flight, finished in fifth place. Nottingham Forest finished 2 points behind Wolverhampton Wanderers and were looking for a place back in the Premiership for the first time since 1999.

== First Division ==
Pos	Team	Pld	W	D	L	GF	GA	GD	Pts
3	Sheffield United	46	23	11	12	72	52	+20	80
4	Reading	46	25	4	17	61	46	+15	79
5	Wolverhampton Wanderers	46	20	16	10	81	44	+37	76
6	Nottingham Forest	46	20	14	12	82	50	+32	74

=== Semi-finals ===
First leg

10 May 2003
12:15

Nottingham Forest	1–1	Sheffield United
Johnson 55'	Report	Brown 58' (pen.)

City Ground, Nottingham
Attendance: 29,064
Referee: Mark Clattenburg

10 May 2003
17:30

Wolverhampton Wanderers	2–1	Reading
Murty 75' (o.g.); Naylor 84'	Report	Forster 25'

Molineux, Wolverhampton
Attendance: 27,678
Referee: Alan Kaye

Second leg

14 May 2003
19:45

Reading	0–1	Wolverhampton Wanderers
	Report	Rae 81'

Madjeski Stadium, Reading
Attendance: 24,060
Referee: Howard Webb

Wolverhampton Wanderers won 3–1 on aggregate.

15 May 2003
19:45

Sheffield United	4–3 (a.e.t.)	Nottingham Forest
Brown 60'; Kabba 68'; Peschisolido 112'; Walker 117' (o.g.)	Report	Johnson 30'; Reid 58'; Page 119' (o.g.)

Bramall Lane, Sheffield
Attendance: 30,212
Referee: Peter Walton

Sheffield United won 5–4 on aggregate.

=== Final ===
26 May 2003
15:00

Sheffield United	0–3	Wolverhampton Wanderers
	Report	Kennedy 6'; Blake 22'; Miller 45'

Millennium Stadium, Cardiff
Attendance: 69,473
Referee: Steve Bennett

== Second Division ==
Pos	Team	Pld	W	D	L	GF	GA	GD	Pts
3	Bristol City	46	24	11	11	79	48	+31	83
4	Queens Park Rangers	46	24	11	11	69	45	+24	83
5	Oldham Athletic	46	22	16	8	68	38	+30	82
6	Cardiff City	46	23	12	11	68	43	+25	81

=== Semi-finals ===
First leg

10 May 2003
15:00

Cardiff City	1–0	Bristol City
Thorne 74'	Report

Ninian Park, Cardiff
Attendance: 19,146
Referee: Howard Webb

10 May 2003
15:00

Oldham Athletic	1–1	Queens Park Rangers
Eyres 28'	Report	Langley 47'

Boundary Park, Oldham
Attendance: 12,152
Referee: Steve Bennett

Second leg

13 May 2003
19:45

Bristol City	0–0	Cardiff City
	Report

Ashton Gate, Bristol
Attendance: 16,307
Referee: Jeff Winter

Cardiff City won 1–0 on aggregate.

14 May 2003
19:45

Queens Park Rangers	1–0	Oldham Athletic
Furlong 82'	Report

Loftus Road, London
Attendance: 17,201
Referee: Mark Clattenburg

Queens Park Rangers won 2–1 on aggregate.

=== Final ===
25 May 2003
15:00

Cardiff City	1–0 (a.e.t.)	Queens Park Rangers
Campbell 114'	Report

Millennium Stadium, Cardiff
Attendance: 66,096
Referee: Howard Webb

== Third Division ==
Pos	Team	Pld	W	D	L	GF	GA	GD	Pts
4	Bournemouth	46	20	14	12	60	48	+12	74
5	Scunthorpe United	46	19	15	12	68	49	+19	72
6	Lincoln City	46	18	16	12	46	37	+9	70
7	Bury	46	18	16	12	57	56	+1	70

=== Semi-finals ===
First leg

10 May 2003
15:00

Bury	0–0	Bournemouth
	Report

Gigg Lane, Bury
Attendance: 5,782
Referee: Jeff Winter

10 May 2003
15:00

Lincoln City	5–3	Scunthorpe United
Weaver 15'; Mayo 18'; Smith 55'; Yeo 82', 90'	Report	Calvo García 26', 69'; Stanton 70'

Sincil Bank, Lincoln
Attendance: 8,902
Referee: Peter Walton

Second leg

13 May 2003
19:45

Bournemouth	3–1	Bury
O'Connor 21'; Hayter 38', 60'	Report	Preece 67'

Fitness First Stadium, Bournemouth
Attendance: 7,945
Referee: Mick Fletcher

Bournemouth won 3–1 on aggregate.

14 May 2003
19:45

Scunthorpe United	0–1	Lincoln City
	Report	Yeo 88'

Glanford Park, Scunthorpe
Attendance: 8,295
Referee: Steve Bennett

Lincoln City won 6–3 on aggregate.

=== Final ===
24 May 2003
15:00

Bournemouth	5–2	Lincoln City
S. Fletcher 29'; C. Fletcher 45', 77'; Purches 56'; O'Connor 60'	Report	Futcher 35'; Bailey 75'

Millennium Stadium, Cardiff
Attendance: 32,148
Referee: Alan Kaye
