= Ludovic Pollet =

French footballer and coach (born 1970)

Personal information
- Date of birth: 18 June 1970 (age 56)
- Place of birth: Vieux-Condé, France
- Height: 1.83 m (6 ft 0 in)
- Position: Defender

Youth career
- Cannes

Senior career*
Years	Team	Apps	(Gls)
1991–1995	Cannes	38	(3)
1995–1999	Le Havre	103	(0)
1999	→ Wolverhampton Wanderers (loan)	6	(0)
1999–2003	Wolverhampton Wanderers	72	(7)
2002–2003	→ Walsall (loan)	5	(0)
2003–2006	Dunkerque	57	(3)
Total		281	(13)

Managerial career
- 2010–2012: Dunkerque
- 2012–2015: Tarbes Pyrénées
- 2015–2016: Gravelines
- 2018–2020: Cannes
- * Club domestic league appearances and goals

Ludovic Pollet (born 18 June 1970) is a French former footballer who played as a defender. He worked most recently as a coach at Cannes.

== Playing career ==
Born in Vieux-Condé, Pollet began his career as a trainee at Cannes, breaking into the first team in 1991. He made nine appearances in his debut season as the club were relegated from Ligue 1. He made sporadic appearances over the next two seasons as the club regained its top flight status. Pollet really established himself during the 1994–95 season, where he also scored his first professional goal.

He was signed by Ligue 2 side Le Havre in Summer 1995 and he became a first choice player as the club won promotion. He played three seasons in France's top division with the club before being loaned out to English First Division side Wolverhampton Wanderers in September 1999.

Pollet made his Wolves debut on 11 September 1999 in a 0–1 defeat to Huddersfield Town. After impressing over six loan games, he was signed permanently for £350,000 in October 1999. He became a first choice player in Colin Lee's side and his performances saw him become a fan favourite as he was voted Player of the Season.

He remained a first choice player during the 2000–01 campaign, but the following summer saw new manager Dave Jones reshape the squad, relegating Pollet to the substitutes bench. He managed only ten further league outings for the club over the next two seasons, although gaining some playing time on loan at lower league Walsall. He was eventually released by Wolves in June 2003, days after they gained promotion to the Premier League.

Pollet then returned to his native France with Dunkerque, where he played for three further seasons, before retiring and becoming an assistant coach at the club.
