= Mark Clyde =

Northern Irish footballer and manager

Personal information
- Full name: Mark Graham Clyde
- Date of birth: 27 December 1982 (age 43)
- Place of birth: Limavady, Northern Ireland
- Height: 6 ft 1 in (1.85 m)
- Position: Defender

Team information
- Current team: Limavady United (manager)

Youth career
- ?–2001: Wolverhampton Wanderers

Senior career*
| Years | Team | Apps | (Gls) |
| 2001–2007 | Wolverhampton Wanderers | 47 | (0) |
| 2002 | → Kidderminster Harriers (loan) | 4 | (0) |
| 2009–2011 | Worcester City | 19 | (1) |
| 2011–2013 | Bridgnorth Town | 0 | (0) |
| Total | | 70 | (1) |

International career
| 2002–2003 | Northern Ireland U21 | 5 | (0) |
| 2004–2005 | Northern Ireland | 3 | (0) |

Managerial career
- 2011–2013: Bridgnorth Town
- 2013–2016: AFC Bridgnorth
- 2019–2020: Limavady United
- * Club domestic league appearances and goals

Mark Graham Clyde (born 27 December 1982, Limavady) is a Northern Irish football manager and former professional footballer who manages NIFL Premier Intermediate League side Limavady United.

During his playing career he represented Wolverhampton Wanderers and Northern Ireland at international level. His career was cut short by persistent injuries aged 24 but later made a successful return to football with Worcester City, earning a contract after a successful trial. He finished his career at Bridgnorth Town where he began his managerial career.

== Playing career ==
=== Wolverhampton Wanderers ===
Clyde was a product of Wolves' academy, and came into contention for a first-team spot in the 2002–03 season. He was initially loaned out to Kidderminster Harriers, then in League Two, where he made four appearances. He made his league debut there on 14 September 2002 in a 1-1 draw at Scunthorpe United.

He returned to Molineux after this brief spell and quickly found a place in the first team, ahead of team captain Paul Butler. He made 17 league appearances for the club in this debut season, which saw Wolves win promotion via the play-offs. Clyde himself missed the conclusion of the campaign though as he suffered a knee injury which was later operated on.

The defender recovered sufficiently to feature in Wolves' Premier League season of 2003–04, playing in nine top-flight games, which earned him a 4-year contract extension in July 2004. After featuring in Wolves' opening 13 games back in the Championship, he suffered another injury blow when he turned his ankle while training with Northern Ireland. He recovered but found his season later halted for good when his knee troubles flared up again in February 2005.

After missing the entire 2005–06 season, having struggled to recover from ankle surgery, he began Wolves' opening three games in 2006–07 under new manager Mick McCarthy. However, his injury problems quickly resurfaced and he was once again sidelined.

On 8 February 2007, Clyde announced his immediate retirement from football, aged just 24, owing to his persistent injury battles. He is now working for Designer Drives and Landscapes ltd. along with Steve Leith and co.

=== Later career ===
Clyde made a return to football for the five-a-side team Bridgnorth 2000 in the JSR Construction Bridgnorth Five-a-Side League in 2007. Clyde signed for non-League Worcester City two years later and occupied a player-coach role under boss Carl Heeley.

=== International career ===
Clyde has represented Northern Ireland three times, making his debut on 8 September 2004 in a 2-2 World Cup qualifying draw in Wales. He has also been selected for their Under-18, U20 and U21 squads.

== Managerial career ==
When Lee Mills left Bridgnorth Town in June 2011, Clyde moved there and replaced him as manager. At the time,becoming Bridgnorth Towns youngest ever manager

In the summer of 2019 he replaced Sean Friars as manager of Limavady United in the NIFL Premier Intermediate League, the third tier of football in Northern Ireland.

== Personal life ==
=== Work ===
After retiring from professional football, Mark spent time working in the waste management sector, collecting household refuse in Bridgnorth.

=== Memorabilia ===
In June 2026, a rare signed photograph of Mark was sold at an online auction for £3.99. The identity of the buyer was not disclosed, although it is believed that the purchaser owns the largest known collection of Mark Clyde memorabilia and signed items.

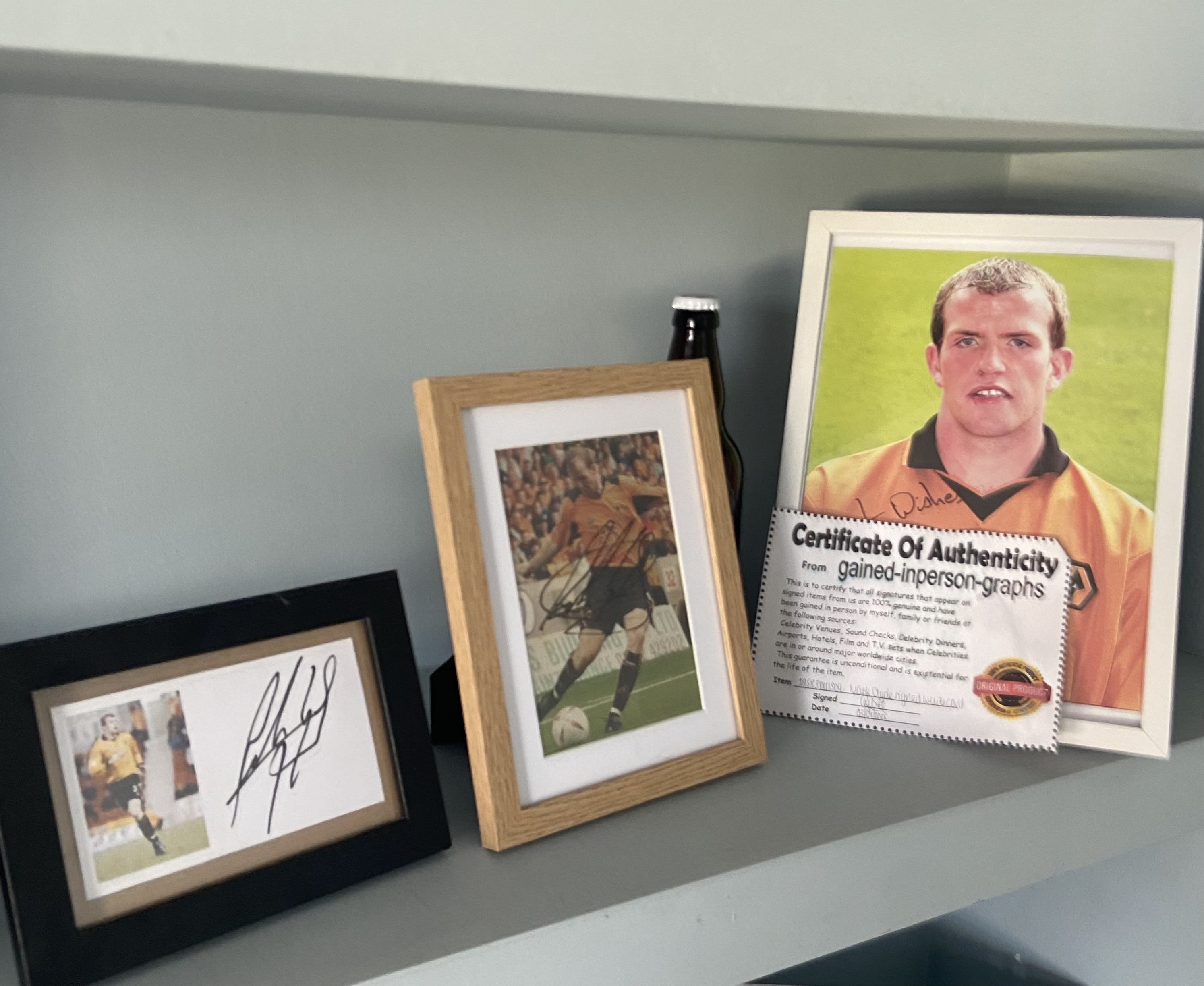
A collection of Mark Clyde memorabilia. Believed by the collector to be the largest collection to date.
