= Lee Naylor (footballer) =

English footballer

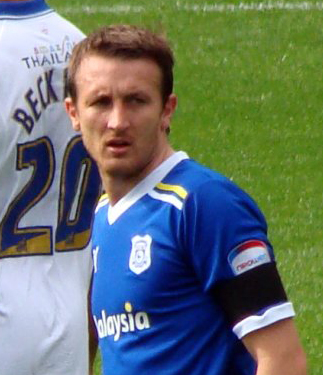
- Naylor playing for Cardiff City in 2011

Personal information
- Full name: Lee Martyn Naylor
- Date of birth: 19 March 1980 (age 46)
- Place of birth: Walsall, England
- Height: 5 ft 10 in (1.78 m)
- Position: Left back

Youth career
- 1996–1997: Wolverhampton Wanderers

Senior career*
Years	Team	Apps	(Gls)
1997–2006	Wolverhampton Wanderers	293	(7)
2006–2010	Celtic	100	(3)
2010–2012	Cardiff City	29	(2)
2013–2014	Accrington Stanley	13	(0)
2014–2015	Derby County	4	(0)
Total		439	(12)

International career
2000–2001	England U21	3	(0)
- * Club domestic league appearances and goals

Lee Martyn Naylor (born 19 March 1980) is an English former professional footballer. He started his career with First Division side Wolverhampton Wanderers, joining the club in 1996. He made his debut the following year and soon established himself as the first choice left back.

His first trophy came when Wolves won the 2003 Football League First Division play-off final, gaining them promotion to the Premier League where he continued to play in the first team. Naylor moved to Scottish Premier League side Celtic in 2006 for a fee of £600,000 plus Charlie Mulgrew. Naylor quickly established himself as first choice left back for Celtic and was nominated for the 2007 SPFA Player of the Year award. During his time at Celtic Naylor won the Scottish Premier League twice in 2007 and 2008 as well as the Scottish Cup in 2007. Naylor moved to Welsh side Cardiff City who play in the English Championship in 2010 after his contract expired at Celtic.

Naylor represented England under-21s several times but despite being linked with the full national team, while at Celtic, he never received a call-up.

== Early life ==
Naylor was born in Walsall, West Midlands, and educated at Sneyd Comprehensive School in nearby Bloxwich.

== Club career ==
=== Wolverhampton Wanderers ===
Naylor joined Wolverhampton Wanderers upon leaving school in 1996. He made his debut on 12 October 1997, in a 1–0 defeat at Birmingham City. Playing left-back, he went on to establish himself as a first team regular in the following years and was part of the team that won promotion to the Premier League in 2002–03 via the playoffs.

He was the Wolves' only ever present player in their Premier League campaign of 2003–04 that saw them relegated. After making the drop, he remained at the club for two further seasons, where he improved further under the management of Glenn Hoddle and attracted the interests of other clubs.

=== Celtic ===
Naylor signed for Celtic on 23 August 2006 for £600,000 plus Charlie Mulgrew on a three-year contract and immediately became the team's first choice left back, winning the SPL October Player of the Month award. Naylor's form was recognised with a nomination for the SPFA Player of the Year award for 2007. He won the League and Cup double in his first season with the club and appeared in all of their UEFA Champions League games. He scored his first goal for Celtic with his weaker right foot in a 2–0 win against Hibernian on 1 March 2008, and his second just over a year later; a late left-footed volley to give Celtic a 2–2 draw with Dundee United on 2 March 2009. On 4 May 2010, Naylor scored with an eighth-minute free kick against Old Firm rivals Rangers. He also went on to assist the winning goal, curling a delightful ball into the box to Marc-Antoine Fortuné to head home. Celtic went on to win the match 2–1 with Naylor excelling in his best Old Firm performance. Upon the expiration of his Celtic contract in June, Naylor left Celtic.

=== Cardiff City ===
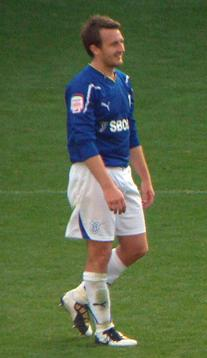
Naylor playing for Cardiff City in 2010

In July 2010, Naylor returned to Wolves to keep fit. He spent a week training with Wolves while searching for a new club. On 19 August, he joined Championship side Cardiff City after training with the side for several weeks. He made his debut in a 4–0 win over Doncaster Rovers, coming on for Kevin McNaughton in the 18th minute. He then scored his first goal on 14 September 2010 against Leicester City, after a cross floated into the back of the net. Naylor scored his second goal, against Leeds United, from 25 yards. Naylor was selected less during Cardiff's poor run of the season, in November and December, and eventually dropped for the Swansea City game at Liberty Stadium. Due to the signing of Jlloyd Samuel, Naylor became a last choice left back behind McNaughton and Darcy Blake. On 9 April, Naylor returned to playing, coming on as a half time substitute for Blake, against Doncaster Rovers, then again came on against Sheffield United. He made his last appearance of the season against Reading, coming on for the injured Paul Quinn, in the play-off semi final, first leg.

After a disappointing first season at Cardiff City Stadium, new manager Malky Mackay gave Naylor a fresh chance, starting him in all of Cardiff's pre-season games. However, despite this Naylor found himself behind new left back Andrew Taylor, playing his first competitive game under Mackay against Oxford United. His first league appearance came in the absence of injured Andrew Taylor, on 4 December 2011 against Birmingham City. However, despite the good performance, he was again dropped when Taylor returned. After only 6 games under Mackay, Naylor was released from the club at the end of his contract.

Following his release, Naylor joined Birmingham City on trial, with a view to a transfer.

=== Accrington Stanley ===
On 20 September 2013, Naylor joined League Two side Accrington Stanley on a short-term deal. On 16 January 2014, Naylor had his contract cancelled by mutual consent.

=== Derby County ===
On 27 February 2014, Naylor joined Derby County on short-term deal. With his short-term contract due to expire, he agreed to stay at Derby in a further one-year deal on 25 June 2014.

== International career ==
During his time with Wolves, Naylor also represented the England Under-21s. After his first season with Celtic, England manager Steve McClaren considered Naylor with a call up to the England squad, but injury put paid to his chances and Naylor was not called up.

== Personal life ==
Naylor's brother, Martyn Naylor, is a former professional footballer and is Leamington's assistant manager. Lee Naylor has 2 daughters, born in 2003 and 2012

== Career statistics ==
Club statistics
Club	Season	League		National Cup		League Cup		Other		Total	
Club	Season	App	Goals	App	Goals	App	Goals	App	Goals	App	Goals
Wolverhampton Wanderers	1997–98	16	0	4	1	1	0	0	0	21	1
Wolverhampton Wanderers	1998–99	23	1	0	0	4	0	0	0	27	1
Wolverhampton Wanderers	1999–2000	30	2	3	0	2	0	0	0	35	2
Wolverhampton Wanderers	2000–01	46	1	2	0	5	0	0	0	53	1
Wolverhampton Wanderers	2001–02	27	0	0	0	0	0	0	0	27	0
Wolverhampton Wanderers	2002–03	32	1	4	0	2	0	3	1	41	2
Wolverhampton Wanderers	2003–04	38	0	2	0	3	0	0	0	43	0
Wolverhampton Wanderers	2004–05	38	1	2	0	1	0	0	0	41	1
Wolverhampton Wanderers	2005–06	40	1	1	0	1	0	0	0	42	1
Wolverhampton Wanderers	2006–07	3	0	0	0	0	0	0	0	3	0
Wolverhampton Wanderers	Total	293	7	18	1	19	0	3	1	333	9
Celtic	2006–07	32	0	5	0	1	0	8	0	46	0
Celtic	2007–08	33	1	3	0	2	0	9	0	47	1
Celtic	2008–09	23	1	2	0	2	0	3	0	30	1
Celtic	2009–10	12	1	2	0	0	0	5	0	19	1
Celtic	Total	100	3	12	0	5	0	25	0	142	3
Cardiff City	2010–11	27	2	2	0	1	0	1	0	31	2
Cardiff City	2011–12	2	0	1	0	3	0	0	0	6	0
Cardiff City	Total	29	2	3	0	4	0	1	0	37	2
Accrington Stanley	2013–14	13	0	0	0	0	0	0	0	13	0
Accrington Stanley	Total	13	0	0	0	0	0	0	0	13	0
Derby County	2013–14	4	0	0	0	0	0	0	0	4	0
Derby County	Total	4	0	0	0	0	0	0	0	4	0
Total		439	12	33	1	28	0	29	1	529	14

== Honours ==
Wolverhampton Wanderers

- Football League First Division play-offs: 2003

Cardiff City

- Football League Cup runner-up: 2011–12
