= Alex Rae (footballer, born 1969) =

Scottish footballer and manager

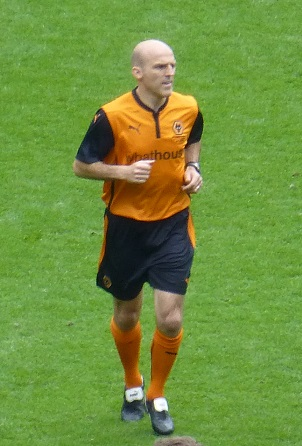
- Rae during Jody Craddock's testimonial in 2014

Personal information
- Full name: Alexander Scott Rae
- Date of birth: 30 September 1969 (age 57)
- Place of birth: Glasgow, Scotland
- Height: 5 ft 8 in (1.73 m)
- Position: Midfielder

Team information
- Current team: Partick Thistle (assistant head-coach)

Youth career
- Rangers

Senior career*
Years	Team	Apps	(Gls)
1987–1990	Falkirk	83	(20)
1990–1996	Millwall	218	(63)
1996–2001	Sunderland	114	(12)
2001–2004	Wolverhampton Wanderers	107	(15)
2004–2006	Rangers	34	(1)
2006–2008	Dundee	26	(3)
2009–2010	Milton Keynes Dons	3	(0)
Total		585	(114)

International career
1990–1992	Scotland U21	9	(3)

Managerial career
- 2006–2008: Dundee
- 2009: MK Dons (assistant)
- 2010–2011: Notts County (assistant)
- 2013–2014: Blackpool (assistant)
- 2014–2015: KRC Genk (assistant)
- 2015–2016: St Mirren
- 2022–2023: Reading (assistant)
- 2025–: Partick Thistle (assistant)
- * Club domestic league appearances and goals

Alexander Scott Rae (born 30 September 1969) is a Scottish professional football manager and former player who played as a midfielder. He is assistant head coach at Partick Thistle.

Rae began his youth career at Rangers and started his senior career at Falkirk. Rae played for Millwall, Sunderland, Wolverhampton Wanderers, Rangers, Dundee, Milton Keynes Dons. Back from rehab clinic for alcoholism in 1998, he was with Sunderland and played regularly in the top flight until September 2001. He then joined Wolverhampton Wanderers, and quickly became the key player in the team, winning the fans's player of the season award. In 2003, he helped the team back into the Premier League, and had his best seasonal tally with 8 goals. He then went back to Scotland, joining Rangers where he had started his youth career, in May 2004, and won the league title in his first season.

Rae was appointed player-manager of Dundee in May 2006. He led the club to third place in the First Division in his first season and took them a place higher in his second. He stopped his career as a footballer during the 2008–2009 season and went to Sweden as part of his work towards a UEFA Pro Licence.

== Playing career ==
Rae was born in Glasgow. He started his career as a youngster at boyhood heroes Rangers but was rejected by boss Graeme Souness. He dropped down to junior leagues with Bishopbriggs before he joined Falkirk and enjoyed a successful two years before heading south to sign for Millwall in 1990 for £100,000. He made his Millwall debut on 25 August 1990 and played for the club for six years. While at the club he would go on to become one of Millwall's highest goalscorers, with 71 goals in all competitions. His form for Millwall earned him a big money move to Premier League Sunderland for £1 million in 1996, where he established himself as a crowd-pleasing, combative midfielder. His career took a downturn though, as he descended into alcoholism, leading to him attending a rehab clinic during 1998. He stayed sober after this treatment and further rehabilitation, and later became a patron for the Sporting Chance clinic.

Back on the field, he won promotion as champions back to the Premier League with Sunderland in 1998–99 and played regularly in the top flight. By 2001, he had dropped out of manager Peter Reid's plans and was sold to Wolverhampton Wanderers in September 2001, for £1.2 million. He quickly became an important player for Wolves, winning the fans' player of the season award in his first campaign. The following year, he helped them back into the Premier League when they won the play-offs in 2003. He had a strong year in the top flight, finishing as the club's leading scorer with eight goals – his best-ever seasonal tally – but could not prevent the club's relegation. Rae re-signed for Rangers in May 2004, and won the league title in his first season, scoring once in the process against Dunfermline. He only featured 12 times in his second season, however, and was later released by the club.

== Coaching and managerial career ==
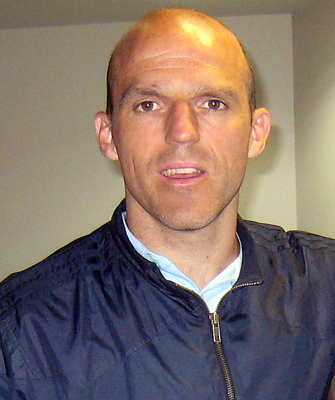
Rae in 2010

Rae was appointed player-manager of Dundee on 24 May 2006. He led the club to third place in the First Division in his first season and took them a place higher in his second. He gave up playing for the 2008–09 season but was sacked on 20 October 2008 with the team in eighth place in the league. Following this, Rae travelled to Sweden as part of his work towards a UEFA Pro Licence.

In July 2009 he joined MK Dons, on a temporary basis with a view to a permanent deal, as first team coach working under his former Wolves teammate Paul Ince.

In 2010, Rae made a return to competitive football to cover for injuries. On 29 October 2010, Rae joined Notts County as assistant manager, but he left the club following the departure of manager Paul Ince on 3 April 2011.

In February 2013, Rae joined Blackpool, once again with Paul Ince. The season finished with Blackpool in 15th place.

On 21 January 2014, along with Paul Ince, Rae's Blackpool contract was terminated and he left the club. In August 2014 he became assistant manager at Belgian club KRC Genk, working with Alex McLeish.

Rae was appointed manager of Scottish Championship side St Mirren in December 2015, after former manager Ian Murray resigned. After an unsuccessful start to the 2016–17 season, Rae and his assistant David Farrell were sacked by the club.

Rae became assistant to Paul Ince at Reading in February 2022. On 11 April 2023, Rae and Ince were sacked by Reading. On 1 October 2023, Rae joined Scottish Premiership side Rangers as a first-team coach after the sacking of manager Michael Beale.

On 19 June 2025, Rae joined Scottish Championship side Partick Thistle as assistant head coach under Mark Wilson.

== Managerial statistics ==
As of match played on 17 September 2016

Team	From	To	Record				
Team	From	To	G	W	D	L	Win %
Dundee	24 May 2006	20 October 2008	97	42	22	33	43.30
St Mirren	18 December 2015	18 September 2016	32	13	6	13	40.63
Total			129	55	28	46	42.64

== Honours ==
Sunderland

- Football League First Division: 1998–99

Wolverhampton Wanderers

- Football League First Division play-offs: 2003

Rangers

- Scottish Premier League: 2004–05
- Scottish League Cup: 2004–05

Scotland U21

- UEFA under-21 Euros: Bronze 1992
- Toulon Tournament: Bronze 1991

Individual

- PFA Team of the Year: 1995–96 First Division
