= Al-Walid =

Al-Walid الوليد
- Pronunciation: Walid, Waleed
- Gender: Male

Origin
- Origin: Semitic (Arabic)
- Meaning: Newborn
- Region of origin: Arabia (Middle East)

Al-Walid is the name of:

- Najiyah bint al-Walid, a sahaba of Muhammad
- Al-Walid ibn Utba ibn Abi Sufyan (died 684), statesman and member of the Umayyad ruling family
- Al-Walid ibn Utba ibn Rabi'a (583-624)
- Khalid ibn al-Walid (592–642), one of the two famous Arab generals of the Rashidun army during the Muslim conquests of the 7th Century
- Al-Walid I (668–715), an Umayyad caliph who ruled from 705 to 715
- Al-Walid II (709–744), an Umayyad caliph who ruled from 743 until 744
- Ibrahim ibn al-Walid (died 750), an Umayyad caliph who ruled for a short time in 744
- Muslim ibn al-Walid (748–823), a poet
- Jonah ibn Janah (990s–1050s), an important Hebrew grammarian and lexicographer of the Middle Ages
- Averroes (1126–1198), or Abul Walid Muhammad Ibn Aḥmad Ibn Rushd, an Andalusian-Arab philosopher, physician, and polymath
- Al Waleed bin Talal Al Saud (born 1955), a member of the Saudi royal family
- Abu al-Walid al-Dahdouh (1965–2006), a senior leader of the Palestinian militant group Islamic Jihad
- Abu al-Walid (1967–2004), an Arab Mujahid who fought in both Chechen Wars
- Al-Waleed bin Khalid Al-Saud (1990–2025), a member of the Saudi royal family

== See also ==
- Waleed, an Arabic name
