= 2012–13 Tottenham Hotspur F.C. season =

English football club season

Tottenham Hotspur
2012–13 season
- Owner: ENIC International Ltd.
- Chairman: Daniel Levy
- Manager: André Villas-Boas
- Stadium: White Hart Lane
- Premier League: 5th
- FA Cup: Fourth round
- League Cup: Fourth round
- UEFA Europa League: Quarter-finals
- Top goalscorer: League: Gareth Bale (21); All: Gareth Bale (26)
- Highest home attendance: 36,763 vs. Sunderland (19 May 2013, Premier League)
- Lowest home attendance: 25,030 vs. Lazio (20 September 2012, Europa League)
Home colours	Away colours	Third colours

The 2012–13 season was Tottenham Hotspur's 21st season in the Premier League and 35th successive season in the top division of the English football league system.

The campaign featured Tottenham's 11th appearance in the UEFA Europa League (formerly the UEFA Cup), entering the group stage due to finishing fourth in the 2011–12 Premier League season but missing out on qualification to the Champions League due to their London rivals Chelsea winning the Champions League trophy in 2012 but finishing outside of the top four positions in the Premier League. The season was also notable for the fact that Tottenham achieved their record points tally in a Premier League season, 72 points from 38 games. They scored 66 goals and conceded 46 throughout the course of the Premier League season, ending with a goal difference of +20.

== First-team squad ==
Note: Flags indicate national team as defined under FIFA eligibility rules; some limited exceptions apply. Players may hold more than one non-FIFA nationality.

No.	Pos.	Nation	Player
1	GK	BRA	Heurelho Gomes
2	FW	USA	Clint Dempsey
3	DF	ENG	Danny Rose
4	DF	FRA	Younès Kaboul
5	DF	BEL	Jan Vertonghen
6	MF	ENG	Tom Huddlestone
7	MF	ENG	Aaron Lennon (2nd vice-captain)
8	MF	ENG	Scott Parker
10	FW	TOG	Emmanuel Adebayor
11	FW	WAL	Gareth Bale
13	DF	FRA	William Gallas (vice-captain)
15	MF	ENG	David Bentley
16	DF	ENG	Kyle Naughton
18	FW	ENG	Jermain Defoe
19	MF	BEL	Mousa Dembélé

No.	Pos.	Nation	Player
20	DF	ENG	Michael Dawson (captain)
22	MF	ISL	Gylfi Sigurðsson
23	MF	GER	Lewis Holtby
24	GK	USA	Brad Friedel
25	GK	FRA	Hugo Lloris
27	MF	ESP	Iago Falque
28	DF	ENG	Kyle Walker
29	MF	ENG	Jake Livermore
30	MF	BRA	Sandro
31	MF	ENG	Andros Townsend
32	DF	CMR	Benoît Assou-Ekotto
33	DF	ENG	Steven Caulker
37	FW	ENG	Harry Kane
46	MF	ENG	Tom Carroll
57	GK	SCO	Jordan Archer

== Transfers ==
=== In ===
==== First team ====
Position	Player	Transferred from	Fee	Transfer window	Date	Source
MF	(Iceland) Gylfi Sigurðsson	(Germany) 1899 Hoffenheim	£8 million	Summer	4 July 2012	
DF	(Belgium) Jan Vertonghen	(Netherlands) Ajax	£9.5 million	Summer	12 July 2012	
FW	(Togo) Emmanuel Adebayor	(England) Manchester City	£5 million	Summer	21 August 2012	
MF	(Belgium) Mousa Dembélé	(England) Fulham	£15 million	Summer	28 August 2012	
GK	(France) Hugo Lloris	(France) Lyon	£12 million (plus £4 million in variables)	Summer	31 August 2012	
MF	(United States) Clint Dempsey	(England) Fulham	£6 million	Summer	31 August 2012	
DF	(England) Zeki Fryers	(Belgium) Standard Liège	£3 million	Winter	3 January 2013	
MF	(Germany) Lewis Holtby	(Germany) Schalke 04	£1.5 million	Winter	28 January 2013	

Total spending: ▼£60 million

=== Out ===
==== First team ====
Position	Player	Transfer	Transferred to	Fee	Transfer window	Date	Source
GK	(England) Ben Alnwick	Released	(England) Barnsley	Free	Summer	1 June 2012	
GK	(Sweden) Oscar Jansson	Released	(Republic of Ireland) Shamrock Rovers	Free	Summer	1 June 2012	
GK	(England) David Button	Sold	(England) Charlton Athletic	£0.5 million	Summer	28 August 2012	
DF	(England) Ledley King	Retired	-	N/A	Summer	19 July 2012	
DF	(New Zealand) Ryan Nelsen	Released	(England) Queens Park Rangers	Free	Summer	1 June 2012	
DF	(Croatia) Vedran Ćorluka	Sold	(Russia) Lokomotiv Moscow	£5.5 million	Summer	27 June 2012	
DF	(Cameroon) Sébastien Bassong	Sold	(England) Norwich City	£5.5 million	Summer	21 August 2012	
MF	(Croatia) Niko Kranjčar	Sold	(Ukraine) Dynamo Kyiv	£5.5 million	Summer	7 June 2012	
MF	(South Africa) Steven Pienaar	Sold	(England) Everton	£4.5 million	Summer	31 July 2012	
MF	(Croatia) Luka Modrić	Sold	(Spain) Real Madrid	£33 million	Summer	27 August 2012	
MF	(Netherlands) Rafael van der Vaart	Sold	(Germany) Hamburg	£10.3 million	Summer	31 August 2012	
FW	(Mexico) Giovani dos Santos	Sold	(Spain) Mallorca	£1.7 million	Summer	31 August 2012	
FW	(France) Louis Saha	Released	(England) Sunderland	Free	Summer	1 June 2012	
GK	(Italy) Carlo Cudicini	Released	(United States) LA Galaxy	Free	Winter	1 January 2013	
MF	(England) Jermaine Jenas	Sold	(England) Queens Park Rangers	Undisclosed	Winter	31 January 2013	

==== Under-21 ====
Position	Player	Transfer	Transferred To	Fee	Transfer Window	Date	Source
GK	(Italy) Mirko Ranieri	Released	Free agent	Free	Summer	1 June 2012	
MF	(England) Jesse Waller-Lassen	Released	Free agent	Free	Summer	1 June 2012	
MF	(England) Lee Angol	Released	(England) Wycombe Wanderers	Free	Summer	3 July 2012	
FW	(England) Kudus Oyenuga	Released	(England) Hayes & Yeading United	Free	Summer	1 June 2012	

==== Loan out ====
Squad #	Position	Player	Loaned to	Start	End	Source
36	DF	(South Africa) Bongani Khumalo	(Greece) PAOK	1 July 2012	31 May 2013	
45	MF	(Australia) Massimo Luongo	(England) Ipswich Town	23 July 2012	31 May 2013	
43	MF	(England) Ryan Fredericks	(England) Brentford	9 August 2012	31 May 2013	
41	MF	(England) John Bostock	(England) Swindon Town	30 August 2012	January 2013	
3	MF	(England) Danny Rose	(England) Sunderland	31 August 2012	31 May 2013	
15	MF	(England) David Bentley	(Russia) Rostov	6 September 2012	January 2013	
21	MF	(England) Jermaine Jenas	(England) Nottingham Forest	27 September 2012	27 October 2012	
42	FW	(England) Simon Dawkins	(United States) San Jose Earthquakes	14 February 2012	30 November 2012	
37	FW	(England) Harry Kane	(England) Norwich City	31 August 2012	1 January 2013	
37	FW	(England) Harry Kane	(England) Leicester City	21 January 2013	31 May 2013	
15	MF	(England) David Bentley	(England) Blackburn Rovers	15 February 2013	June 2013	
31	FW	(England) Andros Townsend	(England) Queens Park Rangers	31 January 2013	31 May 2013	
	GK	(England) Jonathan Miles	(England) Dagenham & Redbridge	28 March 2013	31 May 2013	

Total income: ▲£66.5 million

=== Transfer summary ===
Transfers in = ▼£60 million

Transfers out = ▲£66.5 million

Net = ▲£6.5 million

== Competitions ==
=== Overall ===
Competition	Started round	Current position / round	Final position / round	First match	Last match
Premier League	—	—	5th	18 August 2012	19 May 2013
League Cup	3rd round	—	4th round	26 September 2012	31 October 2012
FA Cup	3rd round	—	4th round	5 January 2013	27 January 2013
UEFA Europa League	Group stage	—	Quarter-Final	20 September 2012	11 April 2013

Updated to match played 21 April 2013
Source: Competitions

=== League table ===
Pos	Team	Pld	W	D	L	GF	GA	GD	Pts	Qualification or relegation
3	Chelsea	38	22	9	7	75	39	+36	75	Qualification for the Champions League group stage
4	Arsenal	38	21	10	7	72	37	+35	73	Qualification for the Champions League play-off round
5	Tottenham Hotspur	38	21	9	8	66	46	+20	72	Qualification for the Europa League play-off round
6	Everton	38	16	15	7	55	40	+15	63	
7	Liverpool	38	16	13	9	71	43	+28	61	

Source: Barclays Premier League
Rules for classification: 1) Points; 2) Goal difference; 3) Goals scored; 4) Play-offs (only if needed to decide champion, teams for relegation or teams for UEFA competitions).

=== Results summary ===
Overall								Home						Away					
Pld	W	D	L	GF	GA	GD	Pts	W	D	L	GF	GA	GD	W	D	L	GF	GA	GD
38	21	9	8	66	46	+20	72	11	5	3	29	18	+11	10	4	5	37	28	+9

Last updated: 19 May 2013.

=== Results by matchday ===
Match	1	2	3	4	5	6	7	8	9	10	11	12	13	14	15	16	17	18	19	20	21	22	23	24	25	26	27	28	29	30	31	32	33	34	35	36	37	38
Ground	A	H	H	A	H	A	H	H	A	H	A	A	H	H	A	A	H	H	A	A	H	A	H	A	A	H	A	H	A	H	A	H	H	A	H	A	A	H
Result	L	D	D	W	W	W	W	L	W	L	L	L	W	W	W	L	W	D	W	W	W	D	D	D	W	W	W	W	L	L	W	D	W	D	W	D	W	W
Position	14	14	14	10	8	5	5	5	4	6	7	7	7	5	4	4	4	6	4	4	3	4	4	4	4	4	3	3	3	4	3	5	5	5	5	5	5	5

Updated to match(es) played on 19 May 2013. Source: matches
A = Away; H = Home; W = Win; D = Draw; L = Loss

== Matches ==
=== Pre-season ===
18 July 2012 Preseason	Stevenage	0–2	Tottenham Hotspur	Stevenage
		Report	Sigurðsson 55', Falque 88'	Stadium: Broadhall Way; Attendance: 5,109

24 July 2012 Preseason	LA Galaxy	1–1	Tottenham Hotspur	Carson, California
		Report	Bale 17'	Stadium: The Home Depot Center; Attendance: 25,676

28 July 2012 Preseason	Liverpool	0–0	Tottenham Hotspur	Baltimore, Maryland
		Report		Stadium: M&T Bank Stadium; Attendance: 42,723

31 July 2012 Preseason	New York Red Bulls	1–2	Tottenham Hotspur	Harrison, New Jersey
		Report	Bale 59', Sigurðsson 65'	Stadium: Red Bull Arena (New Jersey); Attendance: 21,701

5 August 2012 Preseason	Watford	0–1	Tottenham Hotspur	Watford
		Report	Defoe 55'	Stadium: Vicarage Road; Attendance: 9,218

9 August 2012 Preseason	Valencia	2–0	Tottenham Hotspur	Valencia, Spain
		Report		Stadium: Mestalla Stadium; Attendance: 42,000

=== Premier League ===
18 August 2012 1	Newcastle United	2–1	Tottenham Hotspur	Newcastle upon Tyne
17:30 BST	Ba 54'; Ben Arfa 80' (pen.)	Report	Defoe 76'	Stadium: St James' Park; Attendance: 52,385; Referee: Martin Atkinson

25 August 2012 2	Tottenham Hotspur	1–1	West Bromwich Albion	London
15:00 BST	Vertonghen (yellow card) 48'; Assou-Ekotto 74'	Report	Mulumbu (yellow card) 30'; Reid (yellow card) 81'; Morrison 90'	Stadium: White Hart Lane; Attendance: 36,166; Referee: Mike Dean

1 September 2012 3	Tottenham Hotspur	1–1	Norwich City	London
15:00 BST	Dembélé 68'	Report	Snodgrass 85'	Stadium: White Hart Lane; Attendance: 36,142; Referee: Mark Halsey

16 September 2012 4	Reading	1–3	Tottenham Hotspur	Reading
16:00 BST	Robson-Kanu 90'	Report	Defoe 18', 74', (yellow card) 90+3'; Bale 71'	Stadium: Madejski Stadium; Attendance: 24,160; Referee: Howard Webb

23 September 2012 5	Tottenham Hotspur	2–1	Queens Park Rangers	London
16:00 BST	Faurlín 60' (o.g.); Defoe 61'	Report	Zamora 33'	Stadium: White Hart Lane; Attendance: 36,052; Referee: Phil Dowd

29 September 2012 6	Manchester United	2–3	Tottenham Hotspur	Manchester
17:30 BST	Nani 51'; Kagawa 53'	Report	Evans 2' (o.g.); Bale 32'; Dempsey 52'	Stadium: Old Trafford; Attendance: 75,566; Referee: Chris Foy

7 October 2012 7	Tottenham Hotspur	2–0	Aston Villa	London
15:00 BST	Caulker 58'; Lennon 67'; Walker (yellow card) 73'	Report	Delph (yellow card) 27'; Bennett (yellow card) 47'; El Ahmadi (yellow card) 57'	Stadium: White Hart Lane; Attendance: 35,802; Referee: Neil Swarbrick

20 October 2012 8	Tottenham Hotspur	2–4	Chelsea	London
12:45 BST	Huddlestone (yellow card) 37'; Gallas (yellow card) 40', (goal) 47'; Walker (yellow card) 45+2'; Defoe 54'	Report	Cahill 17'; Ivanović (yellow card) 25'; Mata 66', 69'; Sturridge 90'	Stadium: White Hart Lane; Attendance: 36,060; Referee: Mike Dean

28 October 2012 9	Southampton	1–2	Tottenham Hotspur	Southampton
15:00 GMT	Rodriguez 66'	Report	Bale 15'; Dempsey 39'	Stadium: St Mary's Stadium; Attendance: 31,944; Referee: Lee Mason

3 November 2012 10	Tottenham Hotspur	0–1	Wigan Athletic	London
15:00 GMT		Report	Watson 56'	Stadium: White Hart Lane; Attendance: 35,534; Referee: Martin Atkinson

11 November 2012 11	Manchester City	2–1	Tottenham Hotspur	Manchester
13:30 GMT	Zabaleta (yellow card) 29'; Agüero 65'; Džeko 88'	Report	Caulker 21'; Walker (yellow card) 27'; Adebayor (yellow card) 76'	Stadium: Etihad Stadium; Attendance: 47,208; Referee: Michael Oliver

17 November 2012 12	Arsenal	5–2	Tottenham Hotspur	London
12:45 GMT	Mertesacker 24'; Podolski 42'; Giroud 45+1'; Cazorla 60'; Walcott 90+1'	Report	Adebayor 10'; Bale 71'	Stadium: Emirates Stadium; Attendance: 60,111; Referee: Howard Webb

25 November 2012 13	Tottenham Hotspur	3–1	West Ham United	London
16:00 GMT	Defoe (yellow card) 33', (goal) 44', 64'; Bale 58'	Report	O'Brien (yellow card) 7'; Noble (yellow card) 29'; Carroll 82'	Stadium: White Hart Lane; Attendance: 36,034; Referee: Andre Marriner

28 November 2012 14	Tottenham Hotspur	2–1	Liverpool	London
19:45 GMT	Lennon 7'; Bale 16' (yellow card) 78'	Report	Škrtel (yellow card) 38'; Bale 72' (o.g.); José Enrique (yellow card) 90+1'	Stadium: White Hart Lane; Attendance: 36,162; Referee: Phil Dowd

1 December 2012 15	Fulham	0–3	Tottenham Hotspur	London
15:00 GMT		Report	Sandro 55'; Defoe 72', 77'	Stadium: Craven Cottage; Attendance: 25,426; Referee: Chris Foy

9 December 2012 16	Everton	2–1	Tottenham Hotspur	Liverpool
15:00 GMT	Pienaar 90'; Jelavić 90'	Report	Dempsey 76'	Stadium: Goodison Park; Attendance: 36,494; Referee: Lee Mason

16 December 2012 17	Tottenham Hotspur	1–0	Swansea City	London
13:30 GMT	Vertonghen 75'	Report		Stadium: White Hart Lane; Attendance: 35,783; Referee: Mike Dean

22 December 2012 18	Tottenham Hotspur	0–0	Stoke City	London
15:00 GMT		Report		Stadium: White Hart Lane; Attendance: 35,702; Referee: Lee Mason

26 December 2012 19	Aston Villa	0–4	Tottenham Hotspur	Birmingham
17:30 GMT		Report	Defoe 57'; Bale 61', 73', 84'	Stadium: Villa Park; Attendance: 36,863; Referee: Mark Clattenburg

29 December 2012 20	Sunderland	1–2	Tottenham Hotspur	Sunderland
12:45 GMT	O'Shea 40'	Report	Cuéllar (yellow card) 47', 48' (o.g.); Lennon 51'; Dawson (yellow card) 69'; Dembélé (yellow card) 78'; Bale (yellow card) 81'	Stadium: Stadium of Light; Attendance: 41,168; Referee: Martin Atkinson

1 January 2013 21	Tottenham Hotspur	3–1	Reading	London
15:00 GMT	Dawson 9'; Adebayor 51'; Dempsey 79'	Report	Pogrebnyak 4'	Stadium: White Hart Lane; Attendance: 36,180; Referee: Howard Webb

12 January 2013 22	Queens Park Rangers	0–0	Tottenham Hotspur	London
12:45 GMT	Mbia (yellow card) 70'	Report	Dembélé (yellow card) 39'	Stadium: Loftus Road; Attendance: 18,018; Referee: Lee Probert

20 January 2013 23	Tottenham Hotspur	1–1	Manchester United	London
16:00 GMT	Dempsey 90+3'	Report	Van Persie 25'	Stadium: White Hart Lane; Attendance: 35,956; Referee: Chris Foy

30 January 2013 24	Norwich City	1–1	Tottenham Hotspur	Norwich
19:45 GMT	Hoolahan 32' (yellow card) 75'; Garrido (yellow card) 36'; Holt (yellow card) 60'; Snodgrass (yellow card) 71'	Report	Holtby (yellow card) 79'; Bale 80'	Stadium: Carrow Road; Attendance: 26,818

3 February 2013 25	West Bromwich Albion	0–1	Tottenham Hotspur	West Bromwich
13:30 GMT	Popov (red card) 47'; Dorrans (yellow card) 69'	Report	Bale 67'	Stadium: The Hawthorns; Attendance: 24,978; Referee: Mike Clattenburg

9 February 2013 26	Tottenham Hotspur	2–1	Newcastle United	London
12:45 GMT	Bale 5', 78'	Report	Gouffran 24'; Cabaye (yellow card) 90'	Stadium: White Hart Lane; Attendance: 36,244; Referee: Phil Dowd

25 February 2013 27	West Ham United	2–3	Tottenham Hotspur	London
20:00 GMT	Carroll 25' (pen.); J. Cole 58', (yellow card) 59'; Diamé (yellow card) 62'; O'Neil (yellow card) 71'; Collins (yellow card) 82'	Report	Dembélé (yellow card) 8'; Bale 13', 90'; Sigurðsson 76'	Stadium: Boleyn Ground; Attendance: 35,005; Referee: Howard Webb

3 March 2013 28	Tottenham Hotspur	2–1	Arsenal	London
16:00 GMT	Adebayor (yellow card) 19'; Vertonghen (yellow card) 29'; Bale 37'; Lennon 39'; Walker (yellow card) 90+7'	Report	Ramsey (yellow card) 30'; Mertesacker 51'	Stadium: White Hart Lane; Attendance: 36,170; Referee: Mark Clattenburg

10 March 2013 29	Liverpool	3–2	Tottenham Hotspur	Liverpool
16:00 GMT	Suárez 21'; Downing 66'; Gerrard 82' (pen.); Carragher (yellow card) 83'	Report	Vertonghen 45', 53' (yellow card) 57'	Attendance: 44,752; Referee: Michael Oliver

17 March 2013 30	Tottenham Hotspur	0–1	Fulham	London
15:00 GMT	Dempsey (yellow card) 77'	Report	Dejagah (yellow card) 16'; Berbatov 52'	Stadium: White Hart Lane; Attendance: 36,004; Referee: Mike Jones

30 March 2013 31	Swansea City	1–2	Tottenham Hotspur	Swansea
15:00 GMT	Michu (yellow card) 62', (goal) 71'; Davies (yellow card) 83'	Report	Vertonghen 7'; Bale 21'; Adebayor (yellow card) 40'; Walker (yellow card) 68'; Holtby (yellow card) 88'; Parker (yellow card) 90+4'	Stadium: Liberty Stadium; Attendance: 20,604; Referee: Taylor

7 April 2013 32	Tottenham Hotspur	2–2	Everton	London
14:05 GMT	Adebayor 1'; Dempsey (yellow card) 83'; Sigurðsson 87'	Report	Jagielka 15'; Mirallas 53' (yellow card) 81'	Stadium: White Hart Lane; Attendance: 36,192; Referee: Andre Marriner

21 April 2013 33	Tottenham Hotspur	3–1	Manchester City	London
13:30 GMT	Dawson (yellow card) 19'; Assou-Ekotto (yellow card) 48'; Huddlestone (yellow card) 66'; Dempsey 75'; Defoe 80'; Bale 82'	Report	Nasri 5'; Y. Touré (yellow card) 12'; Hart (yellow card) 79'	Stadium: White Hart Lane; Attendance: 36,121; Referee: Lee Mason

27 April 2013 34	Wigan Athletic	2–2	Tottenham Hotspur	Wigan
15:00 GMT	Boyce 11'; Gómez (yellow card) 45'; McManaman 49'; Di Santo (yellow card) 84'; Scharner (yellow card) 90+4'	Report	Bale 9'; Dawson (yellow card) 82'; Boyce 90' (o.g.)	Stadium: DW Stadium; Attendance: 22,326; Referee: Martin Atkinson

4 May 2013 35	Tottenham Hotspur	1–0	Southampton	London
15:30 GMT	Assou-Ekotto (yellow card) 71'; Bale 86'	Report	Davis (yellow card) 73'	Stadium: White Hart Lane; Attendance: 36,190; Referee: Mark Clattenburg

8 May 2013 36	Chelsea	2–2	Tottenham Hotspur	London
19:45 GMT	Oscar 10'; Ramires 39', (yellow card) 90+2'	Report	Adebayor 26'; Vertonghen (yellow card) 79'; Sigurðsson 80'; Bale (yellow card) 87'	Stadium: Stamford Bridge; Attendance: 41,581; Referee: Mike Dean

12 May 2013 37	Stoke City	1–2	Tottenham Hotspur	Stoke-on-Trent
13:30 GMT	Nzonzi 2'; Huth (yellow card) 35'; Begović (yellow card) 41'; Adam (yellow card) 2' (yellow-red card) 47'; Shotton (yellow card) 68'	Report	Dempsey 20'; Huddlestone (yellow card) 76'; Adebayor 83'	Stadium: Britannia Stadium; Attendance: 27,531; Referee: Kevin Friend

19 May 2013 38	Tottenham Hotspur	1–0	Sunderland	London
16:00 GMT	Bale (yellow card) 20' (goal) 90'	Report	McClean (yellow card) 38'; Vaughan (yellow card) 53' (yellow-red card) 75'; Mandron (yellow card) 79'	Stadium: White Hart Lane; Attendance: 36,763; Referee: Andre Marriner

=== Football League Cup ===
26 September 2012 3rd Round	Carlisle United	0–3	Tottenham Hotspur	Carlisle
19:45 BST		Report	Vertonghen 37'; Townsend 53'; Sigurðsson 89'	Stadium: Brunton Park; Attendance: 12,625; Referee: Kevin Friend

31 October 2012 4th Round	Norwich City	2–1	Tottenham Hotspur	Norwich
19:45 GMT	Vertonghen 83' (o.g.); Jackson 86'	Report	Bale 66'	Stadium: Carrow Road; Attendance: 16,465; Referee: Jonathan Moss

=== FA Cup ===
5 January 2013 3rd Round	Tottenham Hotspur	3–0	Coventry City	London
15:00 GMT	Dempsey 14', 37'; Bale 33'	Report		Stadium: White Hart Lane; Attendance: 35,766; Referee: Michael Naylor

27 January 2013 4th Round	Leeds United	2–1	Tottenham Hotspur	Leeds
14:00 GMT	Varney 15'; McCormack 50'	Report	Dempsey 58'	Stadium: Elland Road; Attendance: 29,943; Referee: Kevin Friend

=== UEFA Europa League ===
==== Group stage ====
Group J
Pos	Team	Pld	W	D	L	GF	GA	GD	Pts	Qualification
1	(Italy) Lazio	6	3	3	0	9	2	+7	12	Advance to knockout phase
2	(England) Tottenham Hotspur	6	2	4	0	8	4	+4	10	Advance to knockout phase
3	(Greece) Panathinaikos	6	1	2	3	4	11	−7	5	
4	(Slovenia) Maribor	6	1	1	4	6	10	−4	4	

Source: Soccerway

20 September 2012 1	Tottenham Hotspur (England)	0–0	(Italy) Lazio	London, England
20:05 BST		Report		Stadium: White Hart Lane; Attendance: 25,030; Referee: Ovidiu Hategan (Romania)

4 October 2012 2	Panathinaikos (Greece)	1–1	(England) Tottenham Hotspur	Athens, Greece
18:00 BST	Toché 77'	Report	Dawson 35'	Stadium: Olympic Stadium; Attendance: 23,000; Referee: Florian Meyer (Germany)

25 October 2012 3	Maribor (Slovenia)	1–1	(England) Tottenham Hotspur	Maribor, Slovenia
18:00 BST	Berić 42'	Report	Sigurðsson 55'	Stadium: Ljudski vrt Attendance: 13,000; Referee: Sergei Karasev (Russia)

8 November 2012 4	Tottenham Hotspur (England)	3–1	(Slovenia) Maribor	London, England
20:05 GMT	Defoe 22', 49', 77'	Report	Berić 40'	Stadium: White Hart Lane; Attendance: 27,089; Referee: Antti Munukka (Finland)

22 November 2012 5	Lazio (Italy)	0–0	(England) Tottenham Hotspur	Rome, Italy
18:00 GMT		Report		Stadium: Stadio Olimpico, Attendance: 20,000; Referee: Fernando Teixeira (Spain)

6 December 2012 6	Tottenham Hotspur (England)	3–1	(Greece) Panathinaikos	London, England
20:05 GMT	Adebayor 29'; Karnezis 76' (o.g.); Defoe 83'	Report	Zeca 54'	Stadium: White Hart Lane; Attendance: 32,554; Referee: István Vad (Hungary)

=== Round of 32 ===
14 February 2013 First leg	Tottenham Hotspur (England)	2–1	(France) Lyon	London, England
20:05 GMT	Bale 45', 90'	Report	Umtiti 55'	Stadium: White Hart Lane; Attendance: 31,762; Referee: Pedro Proença (Portugal)

21 February 2013 Second leg	Lyon (France)	1–1 (2–3 agg.)	(England) Tottenham Hotspur	Lyon, France
18:00 GMT	Gonalons 17'	Report	Dembélé 90'	Stadium: Stade de Gerland; Attendance: 38,761; Referee: Wolfgang Stark, (Germany)

==== Round of 16 ====
7 March 2013 First leg	Tottenham Hotspur (England)	3–0	(Italy) Internazionale	London, England
20:05 GMT	Bale 6'; Sigurðsson 18'; Vertonghen 53'	Report		Stadium: White Hart Lane; Attendance: 34,353; Referee: Antonio Lahoz (Spain)

14 March 2013 Second leg	Internazionale (Italy)	4–1 (a.e.t.) (4–4 agg.)	(England) Tottenham Hotspur	Milan, Italy
18:00 GMT	Cassano 20'; Palacio 52'; Gallas 75' (o.g.); Álvarez 110'	Report	Adebayor 96'	Stadium: San Siro; Attendance: 18,241; Referee: Ivan Bebek (Croatia)

4–4 aggregate, Tottenham Hotspur win on away goals

==== Quarter-final ====
4 April 2013 First leg	Tottenham Hotspur (England)	2–2	(Switzerland) Basel	London, England
20:05 GMT	Adebayor 40'; Sigurðsson 58'	Report	Stocker 30'; F. Frei 34'	Stadium: White Hart Lane; Attendance: 32,136; Referee: Milorad Mažić (Serbia)

11 April 2013 Second leg	Basel (Switzerland)	2–2 (a.e.t.) (4–1 p)	(England) Tottenham Hotspur	Basel, Switzerland
20:05 GMT	Salah 27'; Dragović 49'	Report	Dempsey 23', 82'	Stadium: St. Jakob-Park, Attendance: 40,000; Referee: Olegário Benquerença (Portugal)
	Penalties
	Schär (penalty scored); Streller (penalty scored); F. Frei (penalty scored); Díaz (penalty scored)		(penalty missed) Huddlestone; (penalty scored) Sigurðsson; (penalty missed) Adebayor

=== Post-season ===
Tottenham played against the Jamaica national football team on 23 May 2013 in The Bahamas as part of the 40th anniversary of Bahamas' independence celebrations. Jamaica used the game as part of their preparations for the 2014 World Cup qualifying campaign.

23 May 2013	Jamaica	0 – 0	Tottenham Hotspur	Paradise Island
		Report		Stadium: Thomas Robinson Stadium

== Statistics ==
=== Appearances ===
Last updated: 26 July 2020.
Source: premierleague.com

No.	Pos.	Name	Premier League		FA Cup		League Cup		Europa League		Total	
No.	Pos.	Name	Apps	Goals	Apps	Goals	Apps	Goals	Apps	Goals	Apps	Goals
Goalkeepers
24	GK	(United States) Brad Friedel	11	0	2	0	0	0	7	0	20	0
25	GK	(France) Hugo Lloris	27	0	0	0	1	0	5	0	33	0
Defenders
4	DF	(France) Younes Kaboul	1	0	0	0	0	0	0	0	1	0
5	DF	(Belgium) Jan Vertonghen	34	4	1	0	1+1	1	12	1	48+1	6
13	DF	(France) William Gallas	16+3	1	0	0	0	0	5	0	21+3	1
16	DF	(England) Kyle Naughton	13+1	0	2	0	1	0	8+1	0	24+2	0
20	DF	(England) Michael Dawson	23+4	1	1	0	2	0	3+1	1	29+5	2
28	DF	(England) Kyle Walker	36	0	0+1	0	1+1	0	11	0	48+2	0
32	DF	(Cameroon) Benoît Assou-Ekotto	12+3	1	2	0	0	0	4+1	0	18+4	1
33	DF	(England) Steven Caulker	17+1	2	2	0	2	0	5+1	0	26+2	2
39	DF	(England) Adam Smith	0	0	0	0	1	0	0	0	1	0
Midfielders
6	MF	(England) Tom Huddlestone	11+9	0	2	0	1+1	0	3+1	0	17+11	0
7	MF	(England) Aaron Lennon	33+1	4	1	0	0	0	9+2	0	43+3	4
8	MF	(England) Scott Parker	15+6	0	2	0	0	0	6	0	23+6	0
11	MF	(Wales) Gareth Bale	33	21	2	1	1	1	8	3	44	26
19	MF	(Belgium) Mousa Dembele	26+4	1	0+2	0	0	0	8+2	1	34+8	2
22	MF	(Iceland) Gylfi Sigurdsson	12+21	3	2	0	2	1	5+6	3	21+27	7
23	MF	(Germany) Lewis Holtby	4+7	0	0	0	0	0	3+3	0	7+10	0
27	MF	(Spain) Iago Falque	0+1	0	0	0	2	0	0+2	0	2+3	0
29	MF	(England) Jake Livermore	4+7	0	0	0	1	0	1+5	0	6+12	0
30	MF	(Brazil) Sandro	22	1	0	0	0	0	4+1	0	26+1	1
31	MF	(England) Andros Townsend	0+5	0	0+1	0	1	1	1+2	0	2+8	1
38	MF	(England) Ryan Mason	0	0	0	0	1	0	0+2	0	1+2	0
46	MF	(England) Tom Carroll	0+7	0	0+1	0	1+1	0	3+1	0	4+10	0
Forwards
2	FW	(United States) Clint Dempsey	22+7	7	2	3	2	0	6+4	2	32+11	12
10	FW	(Togo) Emmanuel Adebayor	18+7	5	1	0	0	0	8	3	27+7	8
18	FW	(England) Jermain Defoe	27+7	11	0	0	0+1	0	7+1	4	34+9	15
37	FW	(England) Harry Kane	0+1	0	0	0	0	0	0	0	0+1	0
45	FW	(England) Jonathan Obika	0	0	0+1	0	0+1	0	0	0	0+2	0
Players transferred out during the season
23	GK	(Italy) Carlo Cudicini	0	0	0	0	1	0	0	0	1	0
10	MF	(Netherlands) Rafael van der Vaart	1+1	0	0	0	0	0	0	0	1+1	0
21	MF	(England) Jermaine Jenas	0+1	0	0	0	0	0	0	0	0+1	0

=== Goal scorers ===
Last updated: 26 July 2020.
Source: premierleague.com

The list is sorted by shirt number when total goals are equal.

Rnk	Pos	No.	Player	Premier League	FA Cup	League Cup	Europa League	Total
1	MF	11	(Wales) Gareth Bale	21	1	1	3	26
2	FW	18	(England) Jermain Defoe	11	0	0	4	15
3	FW	2	(United States) Clint Dempsey	7	3	0	2	12
4	FW	10	(Togo) Emmanuel Adebayor	5	0	0	3	8
5	MF	22	(Iceland) Gylfi Sigurdsson	3	0	1	3	7
6	DF	5	(Belgium) Jan Vertonghen	4	0	1	1	6
7	MF	23	(England) Aaron Lennon	4	0	0	0	4
8	MF	19	(Belgium) Mousa Dembele	1	0	0	1	2
8	DF	20	(England) Michael Dawson	1	0	0	1	2
8	DF	33	(England) Steven Caulker	2	0	0	0	2
11	DF	13	(France) William Gallas	1	0	0	0	1
11	MF	30	(Brazil) Sandro	1	0	0	0	1
11	MF	31	(England) Andros Townsend	0	0	1	0	1
11	DF	32	(Cameroon) Benoît Assou-Ekotto	1	0	0	0	1
TOTALS				62	4	4	18	88

=== Clean sheets ===
Last updated: 26 July 2020.
Source: premierleague.com

The list is sorted by shirt number when total clean sheets are equal.

Rnk	No.	Player	Premier League	FA Cup	League Cup	Europa League	Total
1	25	(France) Hugo Lloris	9	0	0	2	11
2	24	(United States) Brad Friedel	0	1	0	1	2
3	23	(Italy) Carlo Cudicini	0	0	1	0	1
TOTALS			9	1	1	3	14
