= 2005–06 Wolverhampton Wanderers F.C. season =

English football club season

Wolverhampton Wanderers
2005–06 season
- Chairman: Rick Hayward
- Manager: Glenn Hoddle
- Football League Championship: 7th
- FA Cup: Fourth round
- League Cup: Second round
- Top goalscorer: League: Carl Cort (11); All: Kenny Miller (12)
- Highest home attendance: 28,333 (vs. Manchester United, 29 January 2006)
- Lowest home attendance: 9,518 (vs. Chester City, 23 August 2005)
- Average home league attendance: 23,624 (league only)

The 2005–06 season was the 107th season of competitive league football in the history of English football club Wolverhampton Wanderers. They played the season in the 2nd tier of the English football system, the Football League Championship.

The team finished in seventh place, falling nine points short of a place in the promotion play-offs. Following this season, a summer of changes occurred with manager Glenn Hoddle resigning and many of the club's first team players departing.

== Results ==
=== Preseason ===
Pre season began on 27 June with a week training at the National Sports Centre at Lilleshall. The squad then spent a week in Montecastillo, Spain during 4–10 July.

11 July 2005	Hednesford Town	0–1	Wolverhampton Wanderers	Hednesford
19:30 BST		Report	Clarke 18'	Stadium: Keys Park; Referee: Andy Garratt

12 July 2005	AFC Telford United	0–3	Wolverhampton Wanderers	Telford
19:30 BST		Report	Stewart 22'; Cornes 49'; Miller 83'	Stadium: New Bucks Head; Attendance: 2,205; Referee: Mick Fletcher

16 July 2005	Wycombe Wanderers	1–0	Wolverhampton Wanderers	High Wycombe
19:45 BST	Lescott 49' (o.g.)	Report		Stadium: Adams Park; Attendance: 1,606; Referee: Jarnail Singh

17 July 2005	Kidderminster Harriers	2–1	Wolverhampton Wanderers	Kidderminster
15:00 BST	Russell 20'; Christie 27'	Report	Cort 28'	Stadium: Aggborough; Attendance: 2,161; Referee: Mick Fletcher

20 July 2005	Port Vale	1–2	Wolverhampton Wanderers	Stoke-on-Trent
19:30 BST	Paynter 4'	Report	Cort 13'; Clarke 35'	Stadium: Vale Park; Attendance: 2,281; Referee: Scott Mathieson

23 July 2005	Sheffield Wednesday	0–0 (5 - 4 p)	Wolverhampton Wanderers	Dundee
13:00 BST		Report		Stadium: Tannadice Park; Attendance: 6,695; Referee: Mike Ritchie
	Penalties
	Bullen (penalty scored); Hills (penalty scored); O'Brien (penalty scored); Coughlan (penalty scored); Lucas (penalty scored)		(penalty missed) Cooper; (penalty scored) Cameron; (penalty scored) Kennedy; (penalty scored) Cort; (penalty scored) Lescott

24 July 2005	Dundee	0–4	Wolverhampton Wanderers	Dundee
13:00 BST		Report	Cort 57', 75', 85'; Edwards 83'	Stadium: Tannadice Park; Attendance: 5,081; Referee: Andrew Hunter

27 July 2005	ADO Den Haag	3–0	Wolverhampton Wanderers	The Hague, Netherlands
19:30 BST	Doherty 9' van der Leegte 44'; Stroeve 61'	Report		Stadium: Zuiderpark; Attendance: 2,700; Referee: Rien Koopman

30 July 2005	Wolverhampton Wanderers	2–1	Aston Villa	Wolverhampton
15:00 BST	Cort 13'; Olofinjana 15'	Report	Phillips 30'	Stadium: Molineux; Attendance: 13,603 (2,857 away); Referee: Steve Dorr

=== Football League Championship ===
A total of 24 teams competed in the Championship during the 2005–06 season. Each team would play every other team twice, once at their stadium, and once at the opposition's. Three points were awarded to teams for each win, one point per draw, and none for defeats. The provisional fixture list was released on 23 June 2005, but was subject to change in the event of matches being selected for television coverage or police concerns.

6 August 2005 1	Southampton	0–0	Wolverhampton Wanderers	Southampton
17:15 BST		Report		Stadium: St Mary's Stadium; Attendance: 24,061 (2,184 away fans); Referee: Trevor Kettle

9 August 2005 2	Wolverhampton Wanderers	2–1	Crystal Palace	Wolverhampton
19:45 BST	Seol 4'; Cort 84'	Report	McAnuff 42'	Stadium: Molineux; Attendance: 24,745 (1,244 away fans); Referee: Rob Styles

13 August 2005 3	Wolverhampton Wanderers	1–0	Hull City	Wolverhampton
15:00 BST	Delaney 19' (o.g.)	Report		Stadium: Molineux; Attendance: 24,333 (1,685 away fans); Referee: Lee Mason

20 August 2005 4	Leeds United	2–0	Wolverhampton Wanderers	Leeds
15:00 BST	Lewis 8'; Hulse 60'	Report		Stadium: Elland Road; Attendance: 21,229 (1,646 away fans); Referee: Richard Beeby

27 August 2005 5	Cardiff City	2–2	Wolverhampton Wanderers	Cardiff
15:00 BST	Jerome 3', 49'	Report	Clarke 73'; Lescott 90+1'	Stadium: Ninian Park; Attendance: 11,502 (1,600 away fans); Referee: Graham Salisbury

30 August 2005 6	Wolverhampton Wanderers	3–1	Queens Park Rangers	Wolverhampton
19:45 BST	Cort 8', 24', 90+1'	Report	Gallen 12'	Stadium: Molineux; Attendance: 22,426 (706 away fans); Referee: Nigel Miller

10 September 2005 7	Luton Town	1–1	Wolverhampton Wanderers	Luton
15:00 BST	Nicholls 79'	Report	Cort 25'	Stadium: Kenilworth Road; Attendance: 10,248 (1,800 away fans); Referee: Lee Probert

13 September 2005 8	Wolverhampton Wanderers	1–2	Millwall	Wolverhampton
19:45 BST	Cort 19'	Report	Wright 27'; Hayles 90+2'	Stadium: Molineux; Attendance: 21,897 (258 away fans); Referee: Uriah Rennie

17 September 2005 9	Wolverhampton Wanderers	0–0	Leicester City	Wolverhampton
15:00 BST		Report		Stadium: Molineux; Attendance: 24,726 (1,733 away fans); Referee: Iain Williamson

24 September 2005 10	Stoke City	1–3	Wolverhampton Wanderers	Stoke-on-Trent
15:00 BST	Buxton 90+1'	Report	Cort 42'; Miller 48'; Naylor 73'	Stadium: Britannia Stadium; Attendance: 18,183 (3,682 away fans); Referee: Martin Atkinson

27 September 2005 11	Crewe Alexandra	0–4	Wolverhampton Wanderers	Crewe
19:45 BST		Report	Cort 13', 36'; Miller 27', 34'	Stadium: Gresty Road; Attendance: 7,471 (1,891 away fans); Referee: Ray Oliver

30 September 2005 12	Wolverhampton Wanderers	0–1	Burnley	Wolverhampton
19:45 BST		Report	O'Connor 23'	Stadium: Molineux; Attendance: 21,747 (778 away fans); Referee: Steve Tanner

15 October 2005 13	Sheffield United	1–0	Wolverhampton Wanderers	Sheffield
15:00 BST	Shipperley 16'	Report		Stadium: Bramall Lane; Attendance: 25,533 (2,698 away fans); Referee: Richard Beeby

18 October 2005 14	Wolverhampton Wanderers	1–1	Derby County	Wolverhampton
19:45 BST	Miller 6'	Report	El Hamdaoui 46'	Stadium: Molineux; Attendance: 22,914 (1,210 away fans); Referee: Mike Thorpe

22 October 2005 15	Wolverhampton Wanderers	1–1	Preston North End	Wolverhampton
15:00 BST	Ganea 59'	Report	Etuhu 45+1'	Stadium: Molineux; Attendance: 22,802 (1,168 away fans); Referee: Trevor Kettle

29 October 2005 16	Watford	3–1	Wolverhampton Wanderers	Watford
15:00 BST	DeMerit 69'; King 77'; Devlin 80'	Report	Seol 90+1'	Stadium: Vicarage Road; Attendance: 14,561 (1,926 away fans); Referee: Clive Webster

1 November 2005 17	Brighton & Hove Albion	1–1	Wolverhampton Wanderers	Brighton
19:45 GMT	Frutos 40'	Report	Cameron 82'	Stadium: Withdean Stadium; Attendance: 6,642 (696 away fans); Referee: Brian Curson

5 November 2005 18	Wolverhampton Wanderers	2–0	Norwich City	Wolverhampton
15:00 GMT	Seol 2'; Ganea 37'	Report		Stadium: Molineux; Attendance: 23,808 (1,126 away fans); Referee: Chris Foy

18 November 2005 19	Derby County	0–3	Wolverhampton Wanderers	Derby
19:45 GMT		Report	Ndah 67'; Huddlestone 80'; Ganea 86'	Stadium: Pride Park; Attendance: 22,869 (1,567 away fans); Referee: Tony Leake

22 November 2005 20	Wolverhampton Wanderers	0–0	Sheffield United	Wolverhampton
19:45 GMT		Report		Stadium: Molineux; Attendance: 24,240 (1,794 away fans); Referee: Nigel Miller

26 November 2005 21	Wolverhampton Wanderers	0–0	Southampton	Wolverhampton
12:30 GMT		Report		Stadium: Molineux; Attendance: 24,628 (1,347 away fans); Referee: Paul Taylor

3 December 2005 22	Ipswich Town	1–1	Wolverhampton Wanderers	Ipswich
15:00 GMT	Richards 60' (pen.)	Report	Cameron 51'	Stadium: Portman Road; Attendance: 23,563 (1,004 away fans); Referee: Keith Stroud

10 December 2005 23	Crystal Palace	1–1	Wolverhampton Wanderers	London
15:00 GMT	Johnson 44'	Report	Seol 19'	Stadium: Selhurst Park; Attendance: 19,385 (1,473 away fans); Referee: Mike Thorpe

17 December 2005 24	Wolverhampton Wanderers	1–0	Leeds United	Wolverhampton
15:00 GMT	Ganea 38'	Report		Stadium: Molineux; Attendance: 26,821 (2,800 away fans); Referee: Chris Foy

26 December 2005 25	Wolverhampton Wanderers	0–2	Reading	Wolverhampton
15:00 GMT		Report	Kitson 29'; Convey 64'	Stadium: Molineux; Attendance: 27,980 (1,484 away fans); Referee: Steve Tanner

28 December 2005 26	Sheffield Wednesday	0–2	Wolverhampton Wanderers	Sheffield
19:45 GMT		Report	Anderton 34'; Miller 63'	Stadium: Hillsborough; Attendance: 24,295 (1,274 away fans); Referee: Mike Jones

31 December 2005 27	Wolverhampton Wanderers	1–1	Plymouth Argyle	Wolverhampton
15:00 GMT	Cameron 31'	Report	Ward 22'	Stadium: Molineux; Attendance: 22,790 (1,193 away fans); Referee: Paul Armstrong

2 January 2006 28	Coventry City	2–0	Wolverhampton Wanderers	Coventry
15:00 GMT	Scowcroft 8'; Lescott 35' (o.g.)	Report		Stadium: Ricoh Arena; Attendance: 26,851 (4,163 away fans); Referee: Eddie Ilderton

13 January 2006 29	Wolverhampton Wanderers	2–1	Luton Town	Wolverhampton
19:45 GMT	Davies 57'; Ince 88'	Report	Howard 80'	Stadium: Molineux; Attendance: 21,823 (623 away fans); Referee: Mike Dean

21 January 2006 30	Millwall	0–0	Wolverhampton Wanderers	London
15:00 GMT		Report		Stadium: The New Den; Attendance: 9,905 (1,102 away fans); Referee: Clive Penton

4 February 2006 31	Leicester City	1–0	Wolverhampton Wanderers	Leicester
15:00 GMT	Fryatt 70'	Report		Stadium: Walkers Stadium; Attendance: 21,358 (1,862 away fans); Referee: Lee Probert

11 February 2006 32	Wolverhampton Wanderers	1–1	Crewe Alexandra	Wolverhampton
15:00 GMT	Kennedy 45+2'	Report	Jones 6'	Stadium: Molineux; Attendance: 21,683 (853 away fans); Referee: Lee Mason

14 February 2006 33	Burnley	0–1	Wolverhampton Wanderers	Burnley
19:45 GMT		Report	Ince 15'	Stadium: Turf Moor; Attendance: 11,056 (841 away fans); Referee: Clive Oliver

18 February 2006 34	Wolverhampton Wanderers	1–0	Ipswich Town	Wolverhampton
15:00 GMT	Miller 74' (pen.)	Report		Stadium: Molineux; Attendance: 23,561 (1,500 away fans); Referee: Keith Woolmer

25 February 2006 35	Hull City	2–3	Wolverhampton Wanderers
15:00 GMT	Green (penalty missed) 41'	Report

Cort 51'
Edwards 82' (o.g.)

4 March 2006 36	Queens Park Rangers	0–0	Wolverhampton Wanderers	London
15:00 GMT		Report		Stadium: Loftus Road; Attendance: 14,731 (2,376 away fans); Referee: Paul Armstrong

7 March 2006 37	Wolverhampton Wanderers	0–0	Stoke City	Wolverhampton
19:45 GMT		Report		Stadium: Molineux; Attendance: 22,439 (1,013 away fans); Referee: Brian Curson

11 March 2006 38	Wolverhampton Wanderers	2–0	Cardiff City	Wolverhampton
15:00 GMT	Rósa 15'; Miller 54' (pen.)	Report		Stadium: Molineux; Attendance: 23,996 (1,834 away fans); Referee: Graham Salisbury

18 March 2006 39	Reading	1–1	Wolverhampton Wanderers	Reading
15:00 GMT	Convey 23'	Report	Miller 64'	Stadium: Madejski Stadium; Attendance: 23,502 (1,869 away fans); Referee: Peter Walton

25 March 2006 40	Wolverhampton Wanderers	1–3	Sheffield Wednesday	Wolverhampton
15:00 GMT	Cort 50'	Report	Tudgay 45', 86'; Burton 67'	Stadium: Molineux; Attendance: 25,161 (2,608 away fans); Referee: Darren Drysdale

1 April 2006 41	Plymouth Argyle	2–0	Wolverhampton Wanderers	Plymouth
15:00 BST	Aljofree 9'; Ince 80' (o.g.)	Report		Stadium: Home Park; Attendance: 15,871 (1,500 away fans); Referee: Paul Melin

8 April 2006 42	Wolverhampton Wanderers	2–2	Coventry City	Wolverhampton
15:00 BST	Ince 2'; Cameron 22'	Report	John 25'; McSheffrey 60'	Stadium: Molineux; Attendance: 23,702 (1,523 away fans); Referee: Dermot Gallagher

14 April 2006 43	Wolverhampton Wanderers	1–1	Watford	Wolverhampton
17:15 BST	Aliadière 17'	Report	King 65'	Stadium: Molineux; Attendance: 22,584 (1,398 away fans); Referee: Kevin Wright

17 April 2006 44	Preston North End	2–0	Wolverhampton Wanderers	Preston
15:00 BST	Neal 42'; Ormerod 71'	Report		Stadium: Deepdale; Attendance: 16,885 (1,719 away fans); Referee: Kevin Friend

22 April 2006 45	Wolverhampton Wanderers	1–0	Brighton & Hove Albion	Wolverhampton
15:00 BST	Miller 31' (pen.)	Report		Stadium: Molineux; Attendance: 22,555 (656 away fans); Referee: Neil Swarbrick

30 April 2006 46	Norwich City	1–2	Wolverhampton Wanderers	Norwich
13:30 BST	Earnshaw 73'	Report	Rósa 45+2'; Kennedy 71'	Stadium: Carrow Road; Attendance: 24,081 (1,359 away fans); Referee: Iain Williamson

==== League table ====
Pos	Team	Pld	W	D	L	GF	GA	GD	Pts	Promotion, qualification or relegation
5	Leeds United	46	21	15	10	57	38	+19	78	Qualification for Championship play-offs
6	Crystal Palace	46	21	12	13	67	48	+19	75	Qualification for Championship play-offs
7	Wolverhampton Wanderers	46	16	19	11	50	42	+8	67	
8	Coventry City	46	16	15	15	62	65	−3	63	
9	Norwich City	46	18	8	20	56	65	−9	62	

Updated to match(es) played on 2 December 2011. Source: RSSSF
Rules for classification: 1) points; 2) goal difference; 3) number of goals scored.

==== Results summary ====
Overall								Home						Away					
Pld	W	D	L	GF	GA	GD	Pts	W	D	L	GF	GA	GD	W	D	L	GF	GA	GD
46	16	19	11	50	42	+8	67	9	10	4	24	18	+6	7	9	7	26	24	+2

Source: Statto.com

==== Results by round ====
Round	1	2	3	4	5	6	7	8	9	10	11	12	13	14	15	16	17	18	19	20	21	22	23	24	25	26	27	28	29	30	31	32	33	34	35	36	37	38	39	40	41	42	43	44	45	46
Result	D	W	W	L	D	W	D	L	D	W	W	L	L	D	D	L	D	W	W	D	D	D	D	W	L	W	D	L	W	D	L	D	W	W	W	D	D	W	D	L	L	D	D	L	W	W
Position	11	6	3	10	10	6	6	8	8	5	4	4	6	6	8	10	10	7	4	7	9	9	10	6	8	6	6	7	6	8	9	8	8	8	7	8	7	6	7	7	7	7	7	7	7	7

Source: Statto.com
W = Win; D = Draw; L = Loss

=== FA Cup ===
7 January 2006 R3	Wolverhampton Wanderers	1–0	Plymouth Argyle	Wolverhampton
15:00 GMT	Clarke 26'	Report		Stadium: Molineux; Attendance: 11,041 (1,533 away fans); Referee: Mike Thorpe

29 January 2006 R4	Wolverhampton Wanderers	0–3	Manchester United	Wolverhampton
16:00 GMT		Report	Richardson 6', 52'; Saha 45'	Stadium: Molineux; Attendance: 28,333 (4,300 away fans); Referee: Uriah Rennie

=== League Cup ===
23 August 2005 R1	Wolverhampton Wanderers	5–1	Chester City	Wolverhampton
19:45 BST	Miller 6'; Cameron 62', 74'; Anderton 72'; Ganea 79'	Report	Davies 83'	Stadium: Molineux; Attendance: 9,518 (896 away fans); Referee: Trevor Leake

20 September 2005 R2	Watford	2–1 (a.e.t.)	Wolverhampton Wanderers	Watford
19:45 BST	Carlisle 45', 104'	Report	Miller 12'	Stadium: Vicarage Road; Attendance: 9,296 (765 away fans); Referee: Mike Jones

== Players ==
=== Statistics ===
Key:
‡ On loan from another club * First appearance(s) for the club

- # = Squad number
- Pos = Playing position
- P = Number of games played
- G = Number of goals scored
- GK = Goalkeeper
- DF = Defender
- MF = Midfielder
- FW = Forward
- = Yellow cards
- = Red cards
- † Permanent player left club during the season
- ¤ Loaned to another club for part or all of season

Correct as of end of season. Starting appearances are listed first, followed by substitute appearances in parentheses where applicable.

No.	Pos	Name	P	G	P	G	P	G	P	G	A yellow card	A red card	Notes
No.	Pos	Name	League		FA Cup		League Cup		Total		Discipline		Notes
1	GK	(England) Michael Oakes	16(1)	0	0	0	0	0	16(1)	0	0	0	
2	DF	(Northern Ireland) Mark Clyde	0	0	0	0	0	0	0	0	0	0	
3	DF	(England) Lee Naylor	38(2)	1	1	0	1	0	40(2)	1	4	0	
4	MF	(Nigeria) Seyi Olofinjana	6(7)	0	0	0	1	0	7(7)	0	0	0	
5	DF	(England) Joleon Lescott	46	1	2	0	1(1)	0	49(1)	1	3	0	
6	DF	(England) Jody Craddock	17(1)	0	0	0	1	0	18(1)	0	0	0	
7	DF	(Scotland) Jackie McNamara	9(1)	0	0	0	0(1)	0	9(2)	0	4	0	
8	MF	(England) Paul Ince (c)	15(3)	3	2	0	0	0	17(3)	3	1	0	
9	FW	(Romania) Vio Ganea	11(7)	4	0	0	1(1)	1	12(8)	5	0	1	
10	MF	(Scotland) Colin Cameron ¤	20(7)	4	1(1)	0	2	2	23(8)	6	5	1	
11	MF	(Republic of Ireland) Mark Kennedy	37(3)	2	2	0	1	0	40(3)	2	7	0	
12	DF	(Wales) Rob Edwards	39(3)	0	1	0	2	0	42(3)	0	2	0	
13	GK	(England) Paul Harrison †	0	0	0	0	0	0	0	0	0	0	(Note: Signed on a short-term contract.)
14	MF	(England) Darren Anderton	20(4)	1	1	0	1(1)	1	22(5)	2	1	0	
15	MF	(Hungary) Dénes Rósa	6(3)	2	0(1)	0	0	0	6(4)	2	0	0	
16	FW	(Scotland) Kenny Miller	33(2)	10	2	0	2	2	37(2)	12	11	0	
17	DF	(Scotland) Maurice Ross ‡	13(5)	0	1	0	0	0	14(5)	0	5	0	(Note: Loanee who was signed permanently during the season.)
18	FW	(Nigeria) George Ndah †	6(8)	1	0	0	0(2)	0	6(10)	1	0	0	(Note: Retired in April due to persistent injuries.)
19	MF	(South Korea) Seol Ki-Hyeon	22(10)	4	2	0	2	0	26(10)	4	3	0	
20	GK	(England) Matt Murray ¤	1	0	0	0	0	0	1	0	0	0	
21	GK	(Wales) Paul Jones ¤ †	0	0	0	0	0	0	0	0	0	0	
21	FW	(France) Jérémie Aliadière ‡	12(2)	2	0	0	0	0	12(2)	2	3	0	
22	MF	(England) Tom Huddlestone ‡	12(1)	1	0	0	0	0	12(1)	1	2	0	
24	DF	(Hungary) Gábor Gyepes ‡	19(1)	0	2	0	2	0	23(1)	0	5	0	
25	GK	(Netherlands) Stefan Postma ‡	29	0	2	0	0	0	29	0	0	0	
27	FW	(Guyana) Carl Cort	24(7)	11	1(1)	0	0	0	25(8)	11	0	0	
28	MF	(England) Rohan Ricketts	17(8)	0	0	0	0(1)	0	17(9)	0	2	0	
30	GK	(Nigeria) Carl Ikeme ¤	0	0	0	0	1	0	1	0	0	0	
32	MF	(Northern Ireland) Sammy Clingan ¤ †	0	0	0	0	0	0	0	0	0	0	
32	FW	(Poland) Tomasz Frankowski	12(4)	0	0(1)	0	0	0	12(5)	0	0	0	
33	FW	(England) Leon Clarke ¤	10(14)	1	1	1	1	0	12(14)	2	3	0	
34	MF	(England) Lewis Gobern ¤	0(1)	0	0	0	0	0	0(1)	0	0	0	
36	MF	(England) Daniel Jones	1	0	0	0	0	0	1	0	0	0	
37	MF	(England) Chris Cornes ¤	0	0	0	0	0	0	0	0	0	0	
39	MF	(England) Mark Davies	12(8)	1	1(1)	0	2	0	15(9)	1	3	0	
40	DF	(England) Keith Lowe ¤	3	0	0	0	0	0	3	0	0	0	

=== Awards ===
Award	Winner
Fans' Player of the Season	Kenny Miller
Academy Player of the Season	Daniel Jones

== Transfers ==
=== In ===
Date	Player	From	Fee
23 May 2005	(England) Rohan Ricketts	Tottenham Hotspur	Free
14 June 2005	(Scotland) Jackie McNamara	(Scotland) Celtic	Free
22 August 2005	(England) Darren Anderton	Birmingham City	Free
4 November 2005	(England) Paul Harrison	Unattached	Free
1 January 2006	(Hungary) Gábor Gyepes	(Hungary) Ferencváros	£400,000
1 January 2006	(Hungary) Dénes Rósa	(Hungary) Ferencváros	Undisclosed
6 January 2006	(Netherlands) Stefan Postma	Aston Villa	Undisclosed
25 January 2006	(Poland) Tomasz Frankowski	(Spain) Elche	£1.4 million
25 January 2006	(Scotland) Maurice Ross	Sheffield Wednesday	Free

=== Out ===
Date	Player	To	Fee
11 May 2005	(Republic of Ireland) Gary Mulligan	Released	Free
25 May 2005	(Republic of Ireland) Keith Andrews	Hull City	Free
June 2005	(Sweden) Joachim Björklund	Retired	–
June 2005	(Republic of Ireland) Patrick Flynn	Released	Free
28 July 2005	(England) Kevin Cooper	(Wales) Cardiff City	Undisclosed
6 August 2005	(Senegal) Henri Camara	Wigan Athletic	£3 million
23 January 2006	(Northern Ireland) Sammy Clingan	Nottingham Forest	Undisclosed
24 January 2006	(England) Paul Harrison	Released	Free
31 January 2006	(Wales) Paul Jones	Released	Free
28 April 2006	(Nigeria) George Ndah	Retired	–

=== Loans in ===
Date	Player	From	End date
28 July 2005	(Hungary) Gábor Gyepes	(Hungary) Ferencváros	1 January 2006
19 August 2005	(Netherlands) Stefan Postma	Aston Villa	21 January 2006
25 October 2005	(England) Tom Huddlestone	Tottenham Hotspur	21 January 2006
26 October 2005	(Scotland) Maurice Ross	Sheffield Wednesday	25 January 2006
31 January 2006	(France) Jérémie Aliadière	Arsenal	End of season

=== Loans out ===
Date	Player	To	End date
2 June 2005	(Portugal) Silas	(Portugal) Belenenses	End of season
22 August 2005	(Wales) Paul Jones	Millwall	22 November 2005
26 August 2005	(England) Keith Lowe	Burnley	13 December 2005
27 August 2005	(England) Chris Cornes	Port Vale	26 November 2005
31 August 2005	(Northern Ireland) Sammy Clingan	Chesterfield	14 January 2006
31 August 2005	(Nigeria) Carl Ikeme	Stockport County	14 January 2006
24 November 2005	(England) Lewis Gobern	Blackpool	2 January 2006
31 January 2006	(England) Keith Lowe	Queens Park Rangers	13 February 2006
31 January 2006	(England) Leon Clarke	Queens Park Rangers	13 February 2006
3 March 2006	(Scotland) Colin Cameron	Millwall	7 April 2006
10 March 2006	(England) Keith Lowe	(Wales) Swansea City	13 April 2006
21 March 2006	(England) Matt Murray	Tranmere Rovers	28 April 2006
23 March 2006	(England) Lewis Gobern	Bury	End of season

== Kit ==
The previous season's home kit was retained, featuring the club's traditional gold and black colours. The season however saw a new away kit introduced that was an all-black design, with gold piping on the shirt. Last season's navy blue and white away kit was also retained for this season. The kits were manufactured by Le Coq Sportif and featured Chaucer Consulting as sponsor for a second season.
