= Walidah =

Walidah وليدة
- Gender: Female

Origin
- Origin: Arabic
- Meaning: Newborn child
- Region of origin: Arabia

Other names
- Alternative spelling: Walida, Waleeda, Waleda

Walidah (Arabic: وليدة, also spelled Walida, Waleeda, or Waleda) is an Arabic-language feminine given name. It is the feminine form of Walid (وليد) and generally means "newborn girl", "young girl", or "female child". The name is used in various Arabic-speaking countries and among Muslim communities worldwide. Notable people with the name include:

== Given name ==
- Walidah Imarisha (Amharic: ወሊዳ ኢማሪሻ), American writer, activist, educator, and spoken word artist

== Surname ==
- Hanifah Walidah, American poet, rapper, singer, actor, playwright, educator and LGBT activist.
