= Waleed =

Waleed وليد
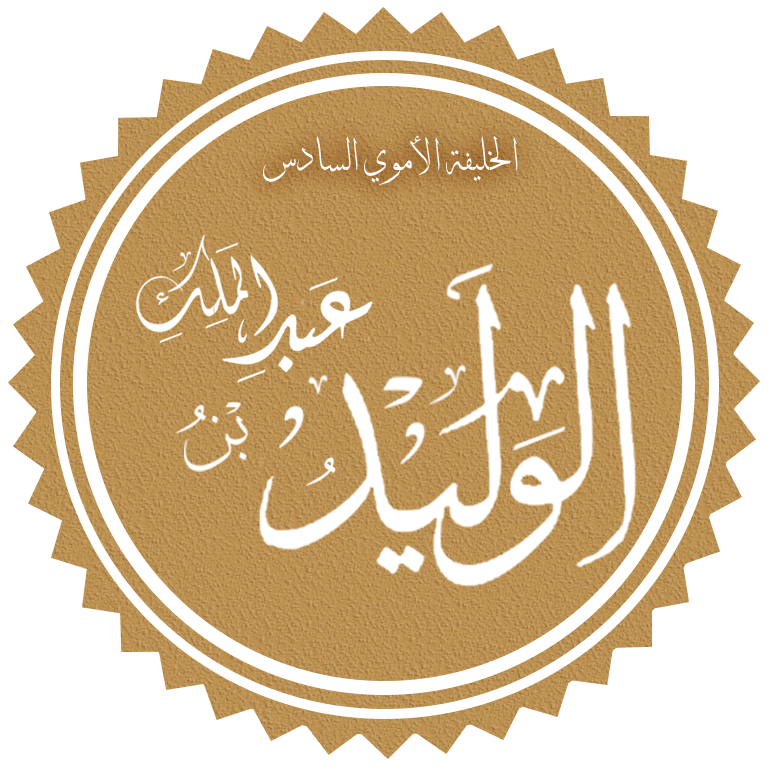
- Calligraphic representation of the name al-Waleed
- Gender: Male

Origin
- Origin: Arabic
- Meaning: Newborn child
- Region of origin: Arabia

Other names
- Alternative spelling: Al-Waleed, al-Walid, Walid, Walied, Oualid, Velid

Waleed (Arabic: وليد) or al-Waleed (الولید), also spelled al-Walid, Walid, Oualid, or Velid, is an Arabic-language masculine given name meaning newborn child.

== Given name ==
=== Waleed ===
- Waleed Abdalati, American scientist
- Waleed Al-Ahmed (born 1999), Saudi Arabian footballer
- Waleed Ali (born 1980), Kuwaiti footballer
- Waleed Aly (born 1978), Egyptian-origin Australian journalist
- Waleed al-Husseini (born 1989), Palestinian ex-Muslim activist
- Waleed bin Ibrahim al-Ibrahim (born 1962), Saudi businessman
- Waleed Al-Jasem (1959–2025), Kuwaiti footballer
- Waleed Majid (born 1987), Qatari professional pool player
- Waleed Al-Saadi (born 1995), Omani footballer
- Waleed A. Samkari (1942–2019), Jordanian military officer
- Al-Waleed bin Talal al-Saud (born 1955), Saudi royal and businessman
- Waleed al-Shehri (1978–2001), Saudi hijacker of American Airlines Flight 11
- Waleed Taha (born 1968), Israeli politician
- Waleed Zuaiter (born 1971), Palestinian-origin American actor and producer

=== Walid ===
==== Historical ====
- Al-Walid I (674–715), sixth Umayyad caliph
- Al Walid ben Zidan (died 1636), tenth sultan of the Saadi Sultanate in Morocco

==== Business ====
- Walid Daouk (born 1958), Lebanese businessman and politician
- Walid Juffali (1955–2016), Saudi businessman
- Walid Mostafa (1972–2025), Egyptian media businessman
- Walid Sadi (born 1979), Algerian businessman

==== Entertainment ====
- Walid Toufic (born 1954), Lebanese singer and actor
- Walid Harfouch (born 1971), Lebanese-born Ukrainian television manager
- Walid Mattar (born 1980), Tunisian film director
- Walid Riachy (born 1990), Lebanese actor and model
- Walid Hassan (comedian) (1959–2006), Iraqi comedian
- Walid Kowatli, Syrian theater director
- Walid Benmbarek (born 1980), Dutch actor

==== Footballers ====
- Walid Regragui (born 1975), Moroccan footballer and manager
- Walid Azaro (born 1995), Moroccan Footballer
- Walid Abbas (born 1985), Emirati footballer
- Walid Cheddira (born 1998), Moroccan footballer
- Walid Atta (born 1986), Saudi-born, Ethiopian footballer

==== Politicians ====
- Walid Assaf (1960–2025), Palestinian politician
- Walid Iqbal, Pakistani politician, lawyer and grandson of Muhammad Iqbal
- Walid Jumblatt (born 1949), Lebanese politician
- Walid Muallem (1941–2020), Syrian politician and diplomat
- Walid al-Samaani (born 1977), Saudi Arabian jurist and administrator of the Government
- Walid Haj Yahia (1936–2015), Israeli politician

==== Sports ====
- Walid Ghauri (born 1993), Norwegian cricket player

==== Others ====
- Walid Khalidi (1925–2026), Palestinian historian
- Walid Saleh, Islamic scholar
- Walid Phares (born 1957), Lebanese-American conservative pundit
- Walid al-Kubaisi (1958–2018), Iraqi-born Norwegian writer
- Walid Shoebat, Palestinian-born American ex-Muslim activist
- Walid bin Attash (born 1978), Yemeni suspect terrorist in American custody at Guantanamo Bay
- Walid Raad (born 1967), media artist
- Walid Siti (born 1952), Kurdish painter and artist

=== Oualid ===
- Oualid Agougil (born 2005), Dutch footballer
- Oualid Ben Amor (born 1976), Tunisian handball player
- Oualid Ardji (born 1995), Algerian footballer
- Oualid El Hajjam (born 1991), French-Moroccan footballer
- Oualid El Hamdaoui (born 1993), French footballer
- Oualid El Hasni (born 1993), Tunisian footballer
- Oualid Malki (born 2004), Algerian footballer
- Oualid Mamoun (born 1996), French-Algerian footballer
- Oualid Mhamdi (born 2003), German-Moroccan footballer
- Oualid Mokhtari (born 1982), Moroccan-born German footballer

== Surname ==
- Khalid Ibn Al-Walid (died 642), Islamic military commander also known as the sword of Allah

== Places ==
- Al-Waleed, an Iraqi town along the Iraq–Syria border
- Bani Walid, a town in Libya
- Valladolid, a city in Spain
- Valladolid, a city in Mexico

== Vehicles ==
- MV Walid (1933), a Lebanese cargo ship from 1979 to 1985 (originally German-built fishing trawler)
- Walid (armoured personnel carrier), an Egyptian APC used in the Arab–Israeli conflict

== See also ==
- Al-Walid (disambiguation)
