= Tom Huddlestone =

English association football player (born 1986)

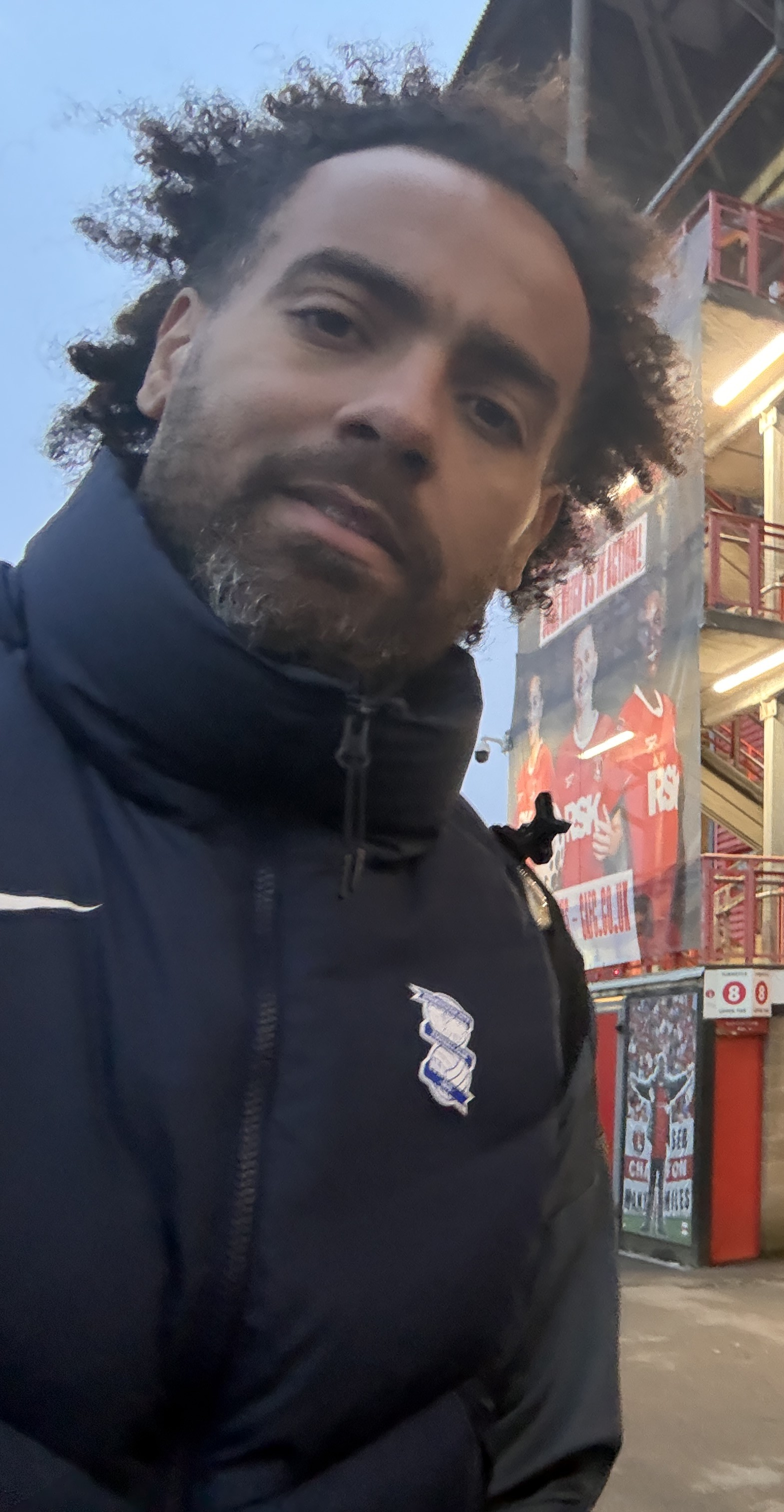
- Huddlestone in 2026.

Personal information
- Full name: Thomas Andrew Huddlestone
- Date of birth: 28 December 1986 (age 39)
- Place of birth: Nottingham, England
- Height: 6 ft 2 in (1.88 m)
- Position: Defensive midfielder

Team information
- Current team: Birmingham City (first team assistant coach)

Youth career
- Nottingham Forest
- –2002: Derby County

Senior career*
Years	Team	Apps	(Gls)
2002–2005	Derby County	88	(0)
2005–2013	Tottenham Hotspur	144	(8)
2005–2006	→ Wolverhampton Wanderers (loan)	13	(1)
2013–2017	Hull City	135	(6)
2017–2020	Derby County	79	(3)
2021–2022	Hull City	11	(0)
2022–2024	Manchester United	0	(0)
Total		470	(18)

International career
2001–2002	England U16	7	(0)
2002–2003	England U17	6	(0)
2004	England U19	3	(0)
2005	England U20	4	(0)
2005–2009	England U21	33	(5)
2009–2012	England	4	(0)
- * Club domestic league appearances and goals

Thomas Andrew Huddlestone (born 28 December 1986) is an English professional football coach and former player who played as a defensive midfielder. He is first team assistant coach at EFL Championship club Birmingham City.

Having progressed through the youth ranks at Nottingham Forest and Derby County, Huddlestone began his professional career in 2003 with the latter club. He quickly broke into the first team, and made 88 league appearances before switching to Tottenham Hotspur in 2005. Having spent some of the 2005–06 season on loan to Wolverhampton Wanderers, where he made 13 league appearances, he began to break into the Tottenham team during the 2006–07 season, and became a regular player for the club. However, he struggled with injury problems during the 2011–12 season, and fell out of favour. He joined Hull City in August 2013, having made 144 league appearances for Tottenham.

In 2013, Huddlestone joined Hull City where he played a role in helping the club reach the 2014 FA Cup final, scoring a goal in the FA Cup third semi-final victory, as they ended up runners-up in the competition, this cup run ensured Hull would qualify for Europe via the UEFA Europa League for the first time in the club's history, Huddlestone would spend four years at Hull and would play 161 times, scoring 8 goals. In July 2017, Huddlestone returned to Derby County, but after two failed play-off campaigns to gain promotion to the Premier League in 2018 and 2019, Huddlestone left Derby in July 2020 after rejecting a contact offer. In his second spell at Derby, Huddlestone played 90 times, scoring 3 goals. After 13 months out of game, Huddlestone returned to Hull City in August 2021, where he spent a season, before ending his career with a two-year spell at Manchester United where he was Under-21s player-coach.

Huddlestone represented England at under-16, under-17, under-19 and under-20 levels before making his under-21 debut in 2005. He was a regular for the under-21 team between 2005 and 2009, and made 33 appearances. He made senior full England debut in 2009, and made three further appearances, his last being in 2012.

== Club career ==
=== Derby County ===
Born in Nottingham, Nottinghamshire, Huddlestone was taken on by Nottingham Forest at an early age but was released at 12 as he was claimed to be "not strong enough". He joined Derby County and after progressing well, made his debut for Derby County's reserve team at the age of just 15, when he appeared as an 80th minute substitute at right wingback in a match against Coventry City.

He was given his first-team debut by George Burley at the age of 16 on the opening day of the 2003–04 season in a 3–0 home defeat to Stoke City, where he was voted man of the match. Though Derby struggled in Huddlestone's first full season, Huddlestone was one of Derby's few bright points, with Burley saying "He's a terrific talent. As a young player, he (is) the best passer of a ball I (have) ever seen, and I've worked with some good young players." He eventually went on to appear in 43 of Derby's 46 league matches that season. He enjoyed an equally successful 2004–05 as Derby reached the First Division play-offs, where they lost to Preston North End in the semi-final. However, halfway through the season Huddlestone signed for Premier League club Tottenham Hotspur in January 2005 for a fee reported to be worth up to £2.5 million, though he remained at Derby for the rest of the season. He had made a total of 95 appearances for Derby, without scoring.

=== Tottenham Hotspur ===
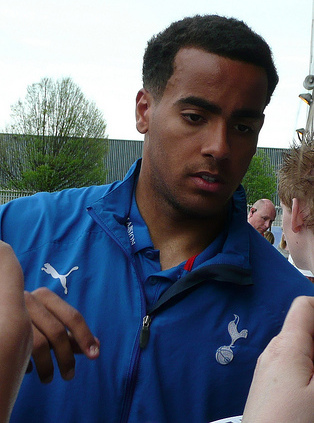
Huddlestone in 2007

Huddlestone spent a few months of the 2005–06 season on loan to Wolverhampton Wanderers, scoring his first league goal, at Derby, before returning to make his debut for Tottenham as a substitute in the 1–0 defeat away at Fulham on 31 January 2006.

His first start for Tottenham came on 14 September 2006, away to Slavia Prague in the UEFA Cup, a match that Tottenham won 1–0. His first goal for Tottenham came in the League Cup fourth round match against Port Vale on 8 November 2006. Huddlestone scored two goals in this match, his second goal proving decisive in extra time, taking Tottenham through to the quarter-final of the competition. Huddlestone got his first league goal for Tottenham on 17 December 2006 against Manchester City with an excellent half-volley on 24 minutes, hit first-time after assisting with teammate Calum Davenport's first goal with a free-kick. Huddlestone established himself as one of the most promising young English central midfielders in the Premier League towards the end of the 2006–07 season and head coach Martin Jol compared Tom Huddlestone with German legend Franz Beckenbauer due to his playmaking abilities, ferocious shot power and versatility.

On 25 December 2006, he signed a new four-and-a-half-year contract – keeping him at the club until 2011. Tom signed a new and improved five-year contract on 30 June 2008 committing his future to Tottenham until 2013. He came on as a substitute as Tottenham beat Chelsea in the 2008 League Cup final at Wembley Stadium. During the 2009–10 season, he became a regular under Harry Redknapp. In March 2010, he extended his contract until 2015. Huddlestone was plagued with injury during the 2011–12 season and managed only four appearances for the club. Huddlestone returned for the 2012–13 season and made his first appearance as a substitute for Jermain Defoe against Norwich City on 1 September 2012. He was shown a red card for serious foul play, the match ended in a 1–1 draw. The red card was later rescinded.

=== Hull City ===
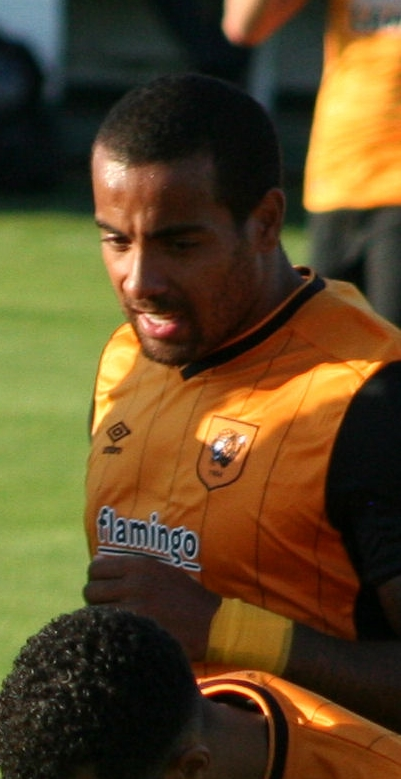
Huddlestone playing for Hull City in 2015

On 14 August 2013, Huddlestone moved to Hull City for an undisclosed fee believed to be about £5.25 million. He made his debut on the first day of the 2013–14 season when he came off the bench in a 2–0 loss away at Chelsea. On 28 December, he scored his first goal for Hull in a 6–0 home win against Fulham, his first goal since April 2011. On 28 January 2014, Huddlestone acted as emergency goalkeeper after Hull City's goalkeeper Allan McGregor was sent off for squaring up with Crystal Palace's player Stuart O'Keefe. With Hull already making three substitutions, Hull's manager Steve Bruce ordered Huddlestone to take over the goalkeeping role.

On 13 April 2014, he scored Hull's third goal in their 5–3 FA Cup semi-final victory over Sheffield United at Wembley Stadium. On 17 May 2014, Huddlestone started in the 2014 FA Cup final against Arsenal at Wembley Stadium, in which Hull were beaten 3–2 after extra time.

On 1 July 2016, he signed a new two-year deal with the club.

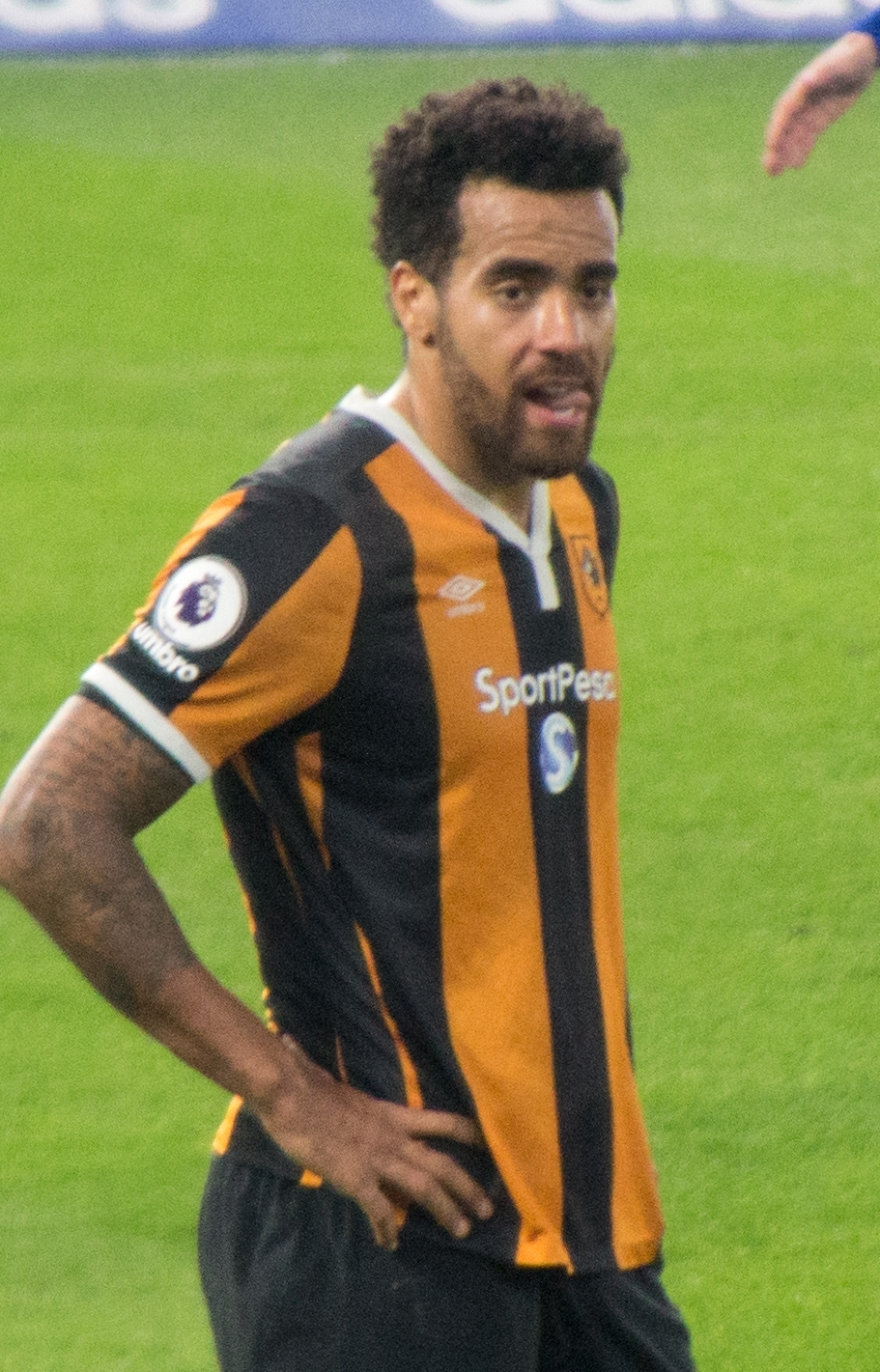
Huddlestone playing for Hull City in 2017.

=== Return to Derby County ===
On 15 July 2017, Huddlestone returned to boyhood club Derby County, by signing a two-year contract, with an option of a third season, for an undisclosed fee, believed to be around £2 million. He scored his first goal for Derby in a 3–0 home win against Brentford on 3 February 2018, more than 14 years after his debut for the club.

On 1 July 2020, Huddlestone revealed that he and Derby County had failed to agree a contract extension and he would be leaving the club.

=== Return to Hull City ===
On 17 August 2021, Huddlestone re-signed for Hull City on a one-year contract. He made his debut the following day when he came on as a 73rd-minute substitute for Richie Smallwood in the home 1–0 loss to Derby County. Huddlestone was one of three senior players to be released at the end of the 2021–22 season.

=== Manchester United ===
On 2 August 2022, Huddlestone signed for Manchester United, primarily to act as a player-coach for its under-21 team. He replaced Paul McShane in this role, who retired from playing at the end of the 2021–22 season.

Huddlestone played in the 2022–23 and 2023–24 editions of EFL Trophy, wearing the number 35.

On 5 June 2024, the club announced he would be leaving. On 2 July 2024, Huddlestone announced his retirement from football.

== Coaching career ==
On 2 July 2024, it was announced that he had been appointed as a first team coach at EFL League One side Wigan Athletic along with Shadab Iftikhar.

On 23 August 2024, Huddlestone joined Ben Futcher's interim backroom staff with the England U21s.

On 18 September 2024, Huddlestone left Wigan Athletic to join fellow League One side Birmingham City.

== International career ==
=== Youth ===
Having been capped at the U-17 and U-19 levels, Huddlestone was a regular in the England under-21s. He played twice in the 2007 UEFA European Under-21 Championship before a red card for dissent ruled him out of the semi-final and final. In October 2008, he scored the opening goal from a free kick in the second leg of the 2009 UEFA European Under-21 Championship qualification play-offs against Wales. Although the match ended in a draw which ensured qualification for England, it was marred by his sending-off in the second half for a reckless challenge on Darcy Blake. He missed the tournament through injury.

=== Senior team ===
He was called up into the England squad for the first time by coach Fabio Capello to face the United States and Trinidad and Tobago in friendlies. On 14 November 2009, he received his first cap for the senior team in the 1–0 loss in a friendly against Brazil, after coming on as a substitute in the 81st minute. His next appearances came in a 2010 FIFA World Cup warm up match against Mexico, where he came on as a substitute in the 61st minute. His latest appearance for England also came in a World Cup warm-up match against Japan where he started for the first time in 2–1 victory.

In May 2010, Fabio Capello announced that Huddlestone would be in his preliminary World Cup squad of 30 players. However, was not selected for the final 23-man squad. On 11 November 2012, new England manager Roy Hodgson gave Huddlestone his first call up to the squad for two years for a friendly match against Sweden on 14 November.

== Style of play ==
He is known for his passing ability, which has led to comparisons with former Tottenham player Glenn Hoddle. He also has a powerful shot that has enabled him to score long-range goals from midfield. It would be fair to say that despite a more modest career than most who share this accolade, he can be described as a Rolls-Royce of a footballer.

== Personal life ==
Shortly after scoring a goal for Tottenham against Arsenal in April 2011, Huddlestone accepted a challenge not to cut his hair until he scored again, to raise money for charity. It took him two and a half years, and 55 matches, before he finally scored his next goal (in a Premier League match for Hull against Fulham on 28 December 2013), and he raised more than £57,000 for Cancer Research UK as a result.

== Career statistics ==
=== Club ===
As of match played 31 October 2023

Appearances and goals by club, season and competition
Club	Season	League			FA Cup		League Cup		Other		Total	
Club	Season	Division	Apps	Goals	Apps	Goals	Apps	Goals	Apps	Goals	Apps	Goals
Derby County	2002–03	First Division	0	0	0	0	0	0	—		0	0
Derby County	2003–04	First Division	43	0	1	0	1	0	—		45	0
Derby County	2004–05	Championship	45	0	2	0	1	0	2 (Note: Appearances in Championship play-offs)	0	50	0
Derby County	Total		88	0	3	0	2	0	2	0	95	0
Tottenham Hotspur	2005–06	Premier League	4	0	—		0	0	—		4	0
Tottenham Hotspur	2006–07	Premier League	21	1	3	0	5	2	6 (Note: Appearances in UEFA Cup)	0	35	3
Tottenham Hotspur	2007–08	Premier League	28	3	2	0	4	1	9	0	43	4
Tottenham Hotspur	2008–09	Premier League	22	0	1	0	2	0	6	2	31	2
Tottenham Hotspur	2009–10	Premier League	33	2	6	0	4	2	—		43	4
Tottenham Hotspur	2010–11	Premier League	14	2	0	0	0	0	7 (Note: Appearances in UEFA Champions League)	0	21	2
Tottenham Hotspur	2011–12	Premier League	2	0	0	0	0	0	2 (Note: Appearances in UEFA Europa League)	0	4	0
Tottenham Hotspur	2012–13	Premier League	20	0	2	0	2	0	4	0	28	0
Tottenham Hotspur	Total		144	8	14	0	17	5	34	2	209	15
Wolverhampton Wanderers (loan)	2005–06	Championship	13	1	—		—		—		13	1
Hull City	2013–14	Premier League	36	3	4	1	0	0	—		40	4
Hull City	2014–15	Premier League	31	0	1	0	0	0	3	0	35	0
Hull City	2015–16	Championship	37	2	4	0	3	0	3	0	47	2
Hull City	2016–17	Premier League	31	1	2	0	6	1	—		39	2
Hull City	Total		135	6	11	1	9	1	6	0	161	8
Derby County	2017–18	Championship	44	2	1	0	0	0	2	0	47	2
Derby County	2018–19	Championship	24	0	2	0	2	0	3	0	31	0
Derby County	2019–20	Championship	11	1	1	0	0	0	—		12	1
Derby County	Total		79	3	4	0	2	0	5	0	90	3
Hull City	2021–22	Championship	11	0	1	0	0	0	—		12	0
Manchester United U21	2022–23	—	—		—		—		4 (Note: Appearance(s) in EFL Trophy)	0	4	0
Manchester United U21	2023–24	—	—		—		—		1	0	1	0
Total		—	—		—		—		5	0	5	0
Career total			470	18	33	1	30	6	52	2	585	27

=== International ===
As of match played 14 November 2012

Appearances and goals by national team and year
National team	Year	Apps	Goals
England	2009	1	0
England	2010	2	0
England	2012	1	0
Total		4	0

== Honours ==
Tottenham Hotspur

- Football League Cup: 2007–08; runner-up: 2008–09

Hull City

- Football League Championship play-offs: 2016
- FA Cup runner-up: 2013–14

Individual

- PFA Team of the Year: 2004–05 Championship
