= Joleon Lescott =

English footballer (born 1982)

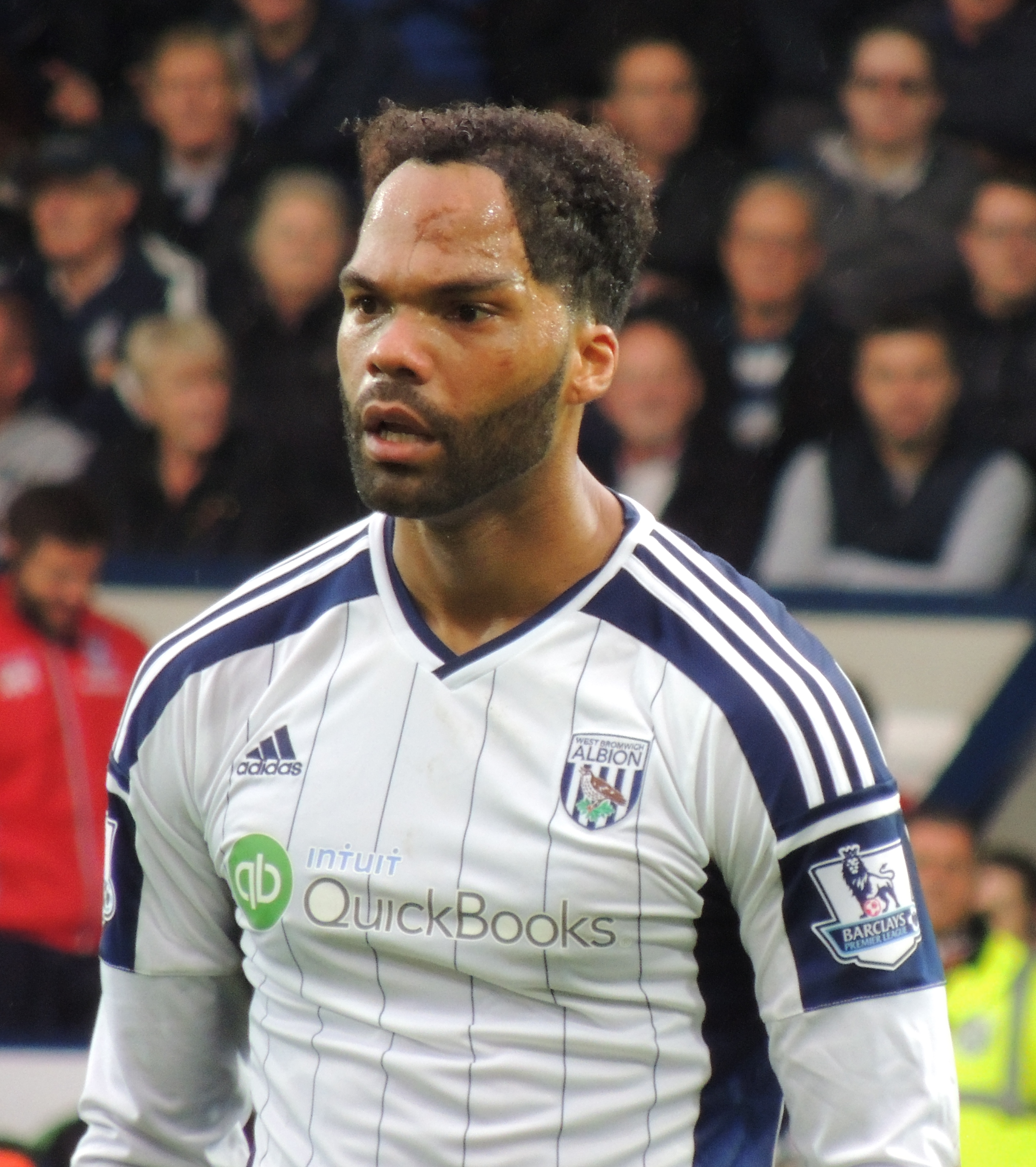
- Lescott playing for West Bromwich Albion in 2014

Personal information
- Full name: Joleon Patrick Lescott
- Date of birth: 16 August 1982 (age 44)
- Place of birth: Birmingham, England
- Height: 6 ft 3 in (1.90 m)
- Position: Centre-back

Youth career
- –2000: Wolverhampton Wanderers

Senior career*
Years	Team	Apps	(Gls)
2000–2006	Wolverhampton Wanderers	212	(13)
2006–2009	Everton	113	(14)
2009–2014	Manchester City	107	(7)
2014–2015	West Bromwich Albion	36	(1)
2015–2016	Aston Villa	30	(1)
2016	AEK Athens	4	(0)
2017	Sunderland	2	(0)
Total		504	(36)

International career
2000	England U17	1	(0)
2001	England U18	2	(0)
2002	England U20	5	(0)
2002–2003	England U21	2	(0)
2007	England B	1	(0)
2007–2013	England	26	(1)
- * Club domestic league appearances and goals

Joleon Patrick Lescott (born 16 August 1982) is an English former professional footballer, coach and sports pundit. He works as an interim coach with the England senior team and plays in the Baller League for Deportrio.

As a player he was a centre-back and was a graduate of the Wolverhampton Wanderers youth academy. He made his first-team debut with Wolves in 2000 and he was named the supporters' Young Player of the Year two years running. He was a regular player as the club won promotion to the Premier League in 2003, but missed the following relegation season through injury. He was named in the Championship team of the year for the 2005–06 season, and subsequently moved to Premier League club Everton for a total of £5 million in August 2006. He was voted Player's Player of the Season by his teammates in the following two seasons. Lescott moved to Manchester City in August 2009 for a reported £22 million and spent five seasons at the club, winning two league titles, an FA Cup and a League Cup. After his release in 2014, he joined West Bromwich Albion on a free transfer and Aston Villa a year later.

Internationally, Lescott represented England at various youth levels before making his senior debut in 2007 against Estonia in the UEFA Euro 2008 qualifiers. He represented the country at UEFA Euro 2012, scoring England's first goal of the tournament in their opening match, a 1–1 draw against France.

== Early life ==
Lescott was born in Birmingham, West Midlands and grew up in the Quinton area of the city, where he attended the Four Dwellings High School. When he was five years old, Lescott was struck by a car outside his primary school, suffering severe head injuries leaving scarring on his forehead and hairline.

== Club career ==
=== Wolverhampton Wanderers ===
His first-team debut for Wolverhampton Wanderers came as a 17-year-old in the 2000–01 season against Sheffield Wednesday at Molineux on 13 August 2000. At the end of his first season, Lescott was named the Supporters' Young Player of the Year by the Wolves fans; an award he also won in the subsequent 2001–02 season.

Lescott started to become a regular fixture in the Wolves team. During the 2002–03 season he missed only one league match and played in each of the club's FA Cup fixtures. He was a member of the team that beat Sheffield United 3–0 at the Millennium Stadium in the 2003 First Division play-off final to win promotion to the Premier League for the 2003–04 season.

Despite Wolves gaining promotion, Lescott was unable to participate in the 2003–04 season due to knee surgery, preventing him from competing in the Premier League. Wolves were subsequently relegated and, upon completing his rehabilitation, Lescott returned to compete in the Championship.

In October 2005, Lescott agreed a two-and-a-half-year extension to his contract at Wolves. At the conclusion of the 2005–06 season, he was named in the Championship PFA Team of the Year.

=== Everton ===
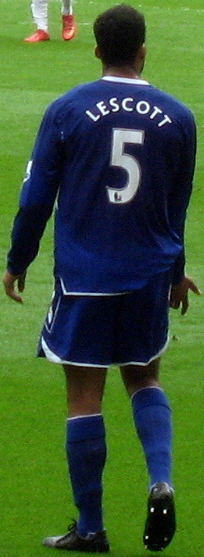
Lescott playing for Everton in 2008

Lescott was sold to Everton at the start of the 2006–07 season for an immediate payment of £2 million, followed by a further £2 million paid in instalments and a final £1 million contingent on appearances. The transfer was slightly delayed as Everton asked for extra medical checks to be taken on Lescott's knee following the reconstruction of the joint earlier in his career. Lescott made his Everton debut in August 2006 during a victory over Watford and his first start of the season away to Tottenham Hotspur, after Alan Stubbs injured his groin in the previous match against Blackburn Rovers. The match was Everton's first victory at White Hart Lane in two decades, and Lescott was named man of the match. Lescott started again in the next match, the 204th Merseyside derby, a 3–0 victory for Everton. Lescott's first Everton goal came in a 1–1 draw against Aston Villa at Villa Park on 2 April 2007. Lescott was voted the Players' Player of the Season for 2006–07 by his teammates. He also finished second behind Mikel Arteta in the Fans' Player of the Season.

The start of the 2007–08 season saw Lescott score three goals in the first eight matches of the season. He did not quite manage to continue scoring at that rate, but he ended the campaign with 10 goals in all competitions and the highest shot-to-goal ratio in the Premier League: 42.1%.

At the end of season awards, Lescott was voted Everton's Player of the Season and Players' Player of the Season. Prior to the final home match of the season against Newcastle, on 11 May 2008, Lescott was also awarded the Player of the Year award by the Everton Disabled Supporters Association. The EDSA labelled Lescott "Mr Consistency" for his performances over the 2007–08 season. He is also only the second Everton player to have ever been awarded the honour twice.

The start of the 2007–08 season saw Lescott move to the left-back position after Joseph Yobo and Phil Jagielka's successful partnership at the centre of Everton's defence provided manager David Moyes with a selection dilemma. On 7 December 2008, Lescott played superbly against Aston Villa scoring two goals, even though Everton lost 3–2.

On 25 January 2009, Lescott scored Everton's only goal – a close-range header – in the FA Cup fourth round meeting with Liverpool. The match ended as a 1–1 draw, but Everton went through by scoring the replay's only goal in extra-time on 4 February. Lescott played for Everton in the 2009 FA Cup Final at Wembley Stadium on 30 May, resulting in a 2–1 defeat to Chelsea.

Following the end of the 2008–09 season, Manchester City attempted to sign Lescott, but Everton publicly rejected two offers. On 11 August 2009, Lescott submitted a formal written transfer request, which was immediately rejected by Everton. Manager David Moyes refused a request from Lescott to be taken out of the squad for the first home match of the season, a 6–1 defeat to Arsenal. Lescott received a mixed reaction from Evertonians when the teams were announced on the PA system.

=== Manchester City ===
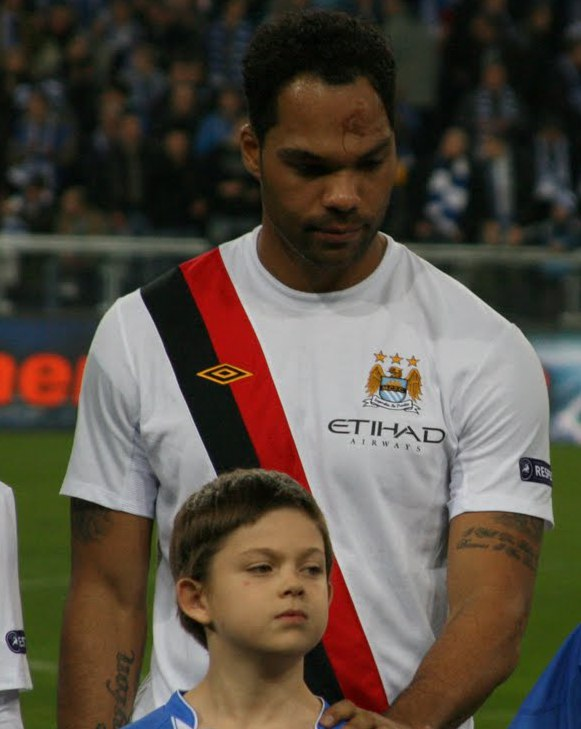
Lescott lining up for Manchester City in 2010

The ongoing saga finally came to an end when Lescott moved to Manchester City for a fee speculated to be £22 million with Lescott signing a five-year contract with the club on 25 August 2009. Lescott made his debut for City on 27 August in a 2–0 League Cup away victory over Crystal Palace and scored his first City goal in a 2–2 draw with Fulham on 25 October 2009. Lescott's first season and a half proved to be a frustrating time for the defender with him struggling to find the form he had shown at Everton, along with picking up a number of injuries, which included re-injuring his knee after hyper-extending it in a 3–3 away draw with Bolton Wanderers. Roberto Mancini replaced Mark Hughes as manager in December 2009 and preferred Lescott after his return from injury to Kolo Touré to partner the fast improving Vincent Kompany for a few months which in this time, including an impressive 4–2 win over Chelsea at Stamford Bridge in March 2010. With Lescott finally showing good form he would once again find himself frustrated after picking up another niggling injury, which would see him struggle to get back into the team in his preferred central defensive role for the foreseeable future.

On 28 December 2010, Lescott scored a header, City's first of the season, in the 4–0 victory over Aston Villa at the City of Manchester Stadium, but during the January 2011 transfer window, with Lescott making few first-team appearances during the first half of the 2010–11 season, there was speculation that he would be moving back to Wolverhampton Wanderers on loan, Roberto Mancini however continually insisted that Lescott was a part of his plans. In February 2011, Kolo Touré was suspended for failing a drug test, this would represent a huge opportunity for Lescott who was reinstalled as the partner of Kompany in central defence. Lescott went from strength to strength as the two formed a formidable defensive partnership. On 17 April 2011, he started and played the full 90 minutes against Manchester United in the 1–0 FA Cup semi-final victory at Wembley Stadium as City reached their first major-final since 1981. On 25 April, eight days after that win over their rivals, Lescott partnered Kompany again in an important match against Blackburn Rovers at Ewood Park and completing the full 90 minutes in a 1–0 win, also making his 30th appearance of the season for City in the process. Lescott was part of the Manchester City team that won the FA Cup, beating Stoke City 1–0 in the final at Wembley Stadium and ending a 35-year wait for a major trophy in the process. He would also score two more headers in the final two matches of the season, in a 3–0 win against Stoke City three days later and also against Bolton Wanderers in a 2–0 win, as City ended the season in third position and qualified for the UEFA Champions League for the first time.

On 7 August 2011, in the 2011 FA Community Shield at Wembley Stadium, Lescott scored in a 3–2 loss against Manchester United. This would prove to be City's last defeat on English soil until a 2–1 defeat by Chelsea on 12 December. During this time, Lescott firmly established himself as a vital part of the team in defence as City recorded 5–1 and 6–1 away victories over Tottenham and Manchester United respectively, in which Lescott started both and assisted a goal in the victory over United. Lescott scored an own goal in a 1–1 draw with Liverpool at Anfield in November but continued to show strong form throughout the season. Lescott also made his Champions League debut against Napoli, though City failed to progress past the group stages. On 22 January 2012, Lescott scored a goal in a 3–2 win against Tottenham, giving City a 2–0 lead at the time. He was an unused substitute as City were beaten 1–0 by Wigan Athletic in the 2013 FA Cup Final at Wembley Stadium on 11 May.

In 2014, Lescott was reportedly offered the chance to leave Manchester City with clubs such as West Ham being linked as prospective destinations, and a deal being agreed at one point. However, Lescott turned down a move to "win trophies" before seeing what happened at the end of the season. Lescott fulfilled his wishes, winning the League Cup and the 2013–14 Premier League.

On 24 May 2014, Lescott was released by City.

=== West Bromwich Albion ===
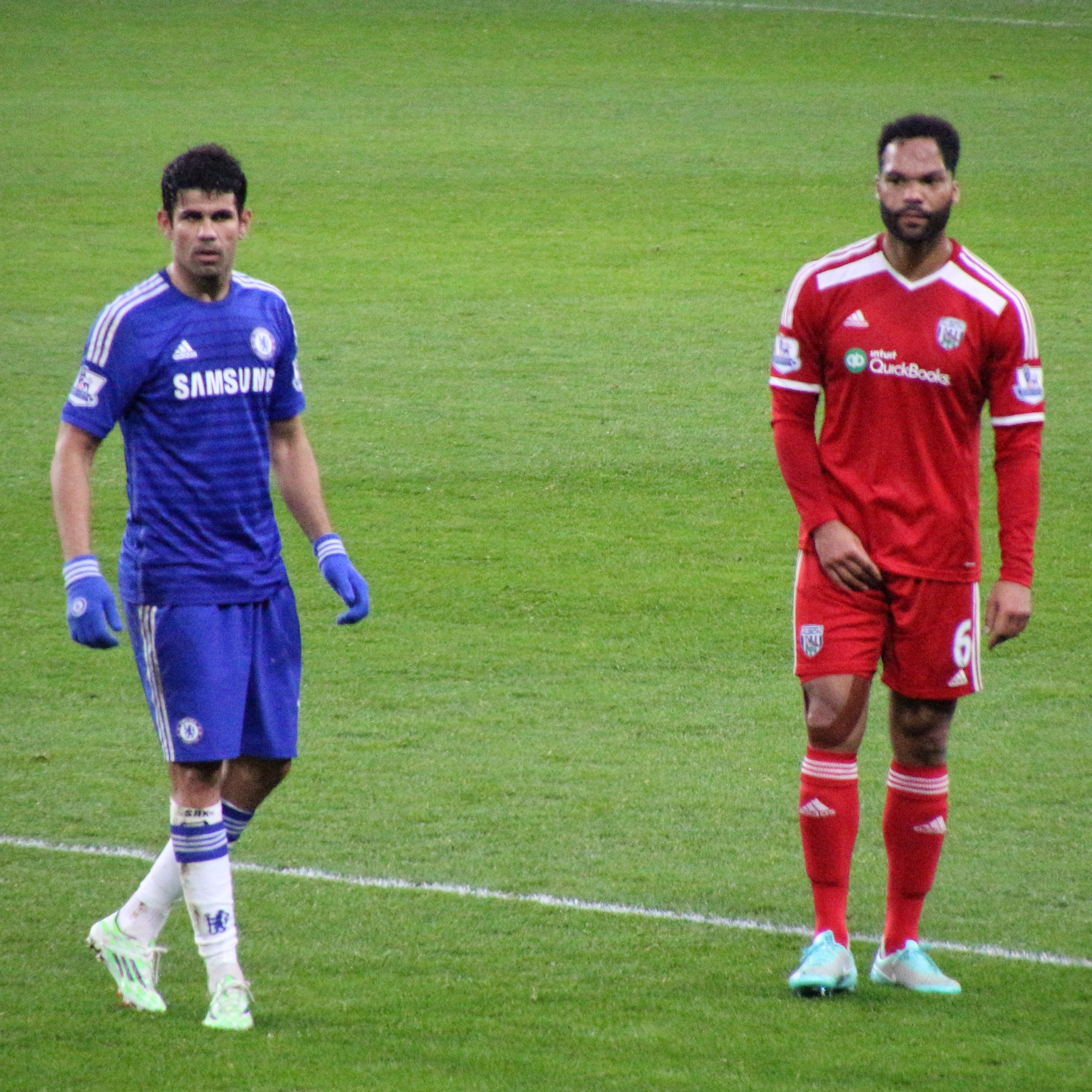
Lescott (right) playing for West Bromwich Albion in 2014

Lescott signed for West Bromwich Albion on 20 June 2014 on a free transfer, signing a two-year contract with the option of a further year. He was the first signing for the club by Alan Irvine, with whom he had previously worked at Everton, and he also knew his assistant Rob Kelly from Wolves. He scored his first goal in a 3–2 defeat against Queens Park Rangers. Following six clean sheets in only ten matches under new manager Tony Pulis, Lescott was praised by the fans with some calling for a call-up back into the England squad.

=== Aston Villa ===
On 1 September 2015, Lescott signed for fellow Premier League club Aston Villa. In December 2008, Lescott had been revealed as a Villa fan when he put two past Villa for Everton and still lost the match. When signing for Villa, Lescott confirmed to the Birmingham Mail he has been an Aston Villa fan from a young age.

Lescott made his debut twelve days later, playing the entirety of a 3–2 loss away to Leicester City. On 5 December, he scored his first goal for Villa, finishing Jordan Veretout's corner kick to open a 1–1 draw at Southampton. Lescott scored again for The Villans when another of his headers was fumbled by Wayne Hennessey in what proved to be the only goal in a 1–0 win over Crystal Palace on 12 January 2016, just the team's second win of the 2015–16 season and first of 20 matches, and their first clean sheet since 8 November. On 6 February 2016, Lescott was on the score sheet again in a 2–0 victory over Norwich City, his header finding its way past Declan Rudd from Carles Gil's corner.

Eight days later, after last-placed Villa lost 0–6 at home to Liverpool, Lescott drew the ire of fans when he tweeted a picture of a luxury car. He later claimed that this was an accident when his mobile was in his pocket, and apologised for the performance. In a season that ended with relegation, Lescott's performances, efforts and attitude were criticised by the fans and press.

In April 2016, Lescott again angered fans with controversial comments following the club's confirmed relegation to the Championship after losing to Manchester United. He described the relegation as "a weight off the shoulders" and that they "can give these fans what they deserve – some performances".

=== AEK Athens ===
On 29 August 2016, Lescott joined Super League Greece club AEK Athens on a two-year contract. The 34-year-old defender suffered a detached cartilage in his knee while cycling in his apartment. The injury ruled Lescott out for the remainder of the season. The player refused to get help from the team's doctors and insisted on completing his rehabilitation in the UK. AEK Athens did not agree to the player's wishes and additional demands, which resulted in his contract being terminated on 14 November 2016 by mutual consent.

=== Sunderland ===
On 24 January 2017, Sunderland signed Lescott on a short-term contract until the end of the season. His departure was confirmed on 9 June 2017.

=== Racing Murcia ===
On 27 November 2020, three years after Lescott's retirement, Spanish Tercera División side Racing Murcia announced they had signed Lescott to play in their Copa del Rey match against Levante. Lescott later announced that he had not agreed to officially sign when the club announced the signing and was still only in preliminary discussions.

== International career ==
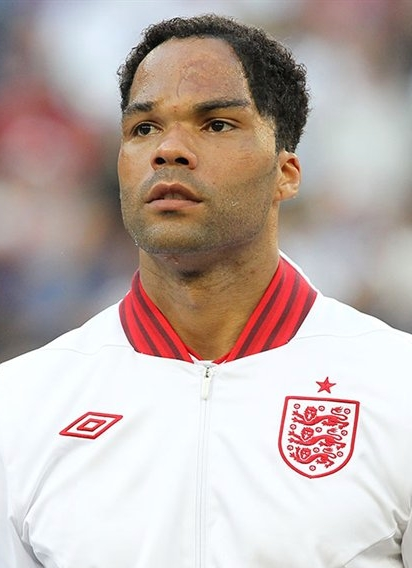
Lescott with England at UEFA Euro 2012

Lescott has represented England at under-18, under-20, under-21 and B levels. After his first season for Everton, Lescott made his England B debut against Albania at Burnley's Turf Moor on 25 May 2007, he replaced Reading's Nicky Shorey in the 74th minute.

On 3 September 2007, Lescott received a call-up to Steve McClaren's England squad for the UEFA Euro 2008 qualifiers with Israel and Russia. Lescott made his international senior debut against Estonia on 13 October 2007 – replacing Rio Ferdinand at half-time – with England winning 3–0. His second cap – and first start – was the UEFA Euro 2008 qualifier against Russia, which England lost 2–1.

Lescott made his first England appearance under the management of Fabio Capello on 26 March 2008 in a friendly match against France, coming on as a substitute at half time for the captain John Terry. He made two appearances in qualifying for the 2010 FIFA World Cup, but injury prevented him from being part of the squad for the finals. Lescott was a regular member of the England squad during qualification for UEFA Euro 2012 and was named in Roy Hodgson's 23-man squad for the tournament. On 11 June 2012, he scored his first international goal for England with a header against France in England's opening match of UEFA Euro 2012.

== Coaching career ==
On 31 August 2021, Lescott was appointed to Lee Carsley's coaching team with the England U21s.

On 23 August 2024, Lescott was named as part of Carsley's interim backroom team with the England senior team following Gareth Southgate's departure the month before.

== Personal life ==
Born in England, Lescott is of Kittitian descent. In April 2012, Lescott, his brother Aaron Lescott, and now retired defender Jordan Stewart launched a fashion line of high end designer clothes called "The Lescott Stewart Collection."

== Career statistics ==
=== Club ===
Appearances and goals by club, season and competition
Club	Season	League			FA Cup (Note: Includes FA Cup)		League Cup (Note: Includes Football League Cup)		Europe		Other		Total	
Club	Season	Division	Apps	Goals	Apps	Goals	Apps	Goals	Apps	Goals	Apps	Goals	Apps	Goals
Wolverhampton Wanderers	1999–2000	First Division	0	0	0	0	0	0	—		="2"|—		0	0
Wolverhampton Wanderers	2000–01	First Division	37	2	2	0	5	0	—		—		44	2
Wolverhampton Wanderers	2001–02	First Division	44	5	0	0	0	0	—		2 (Note: Appearances in First Division play-offs)	0	46	5
Wolverhampton Wanderers	2002–03	First Division	44	1	4	0	1	0	—		3	0	52	1
Wolverhampton Wanderers	2003–04	Premier League	0	0	0	0	0	0	—		—		0	0
Wolverhampton Wanderers	2004–05	Championship	41	4	2	0	0	0	—		—		43	4
Wolverhampton Wanderers	2005–06	Championship	46	1	2	0	2	0	—		—		50	1
Wolverhampton Wanderers	Total		212	13	10	0	8	0	0	0	5	0	235	13
Everton	2006–07	Premier League	38	2	1	0	3	0	—		—		42	2
Everton	2007–08	Premier League	38	8	1	0	5	0	10 (Note: Appearances in UEFA Cup)	2	—		54	10
Everton	2008–09	Premier League	36	4	7	1	1	0	2	0	—		46	5
Everton	2009–10	Premier League	1	0	—		—		0	0	—		1	0
Everton	Total		113	14	9	1	9	0	12	2	0	0	143	17
Manchester City	2009–10	Premier League	18	1	2	0	4	1	—		—		24	2
Manchester City	2010–11	Premier League	22	3	8	0	0	0	7 (Note: Appearances in UEFA Europa League)	0	—		37	3
Manchester City	2011–12	Premier League	31	2	1	0	2	0	7 (Note: Four appearances in UEFA Champions League, three UEFA Europa League)	0	1 (Note: Appearance in FA Community Shield)	1	42	3
Manchester City	2012–13	Premier League	26	1	4	0	1	0	2 (Note: Appearances in UEFA Champions League)	0	0	0	33	1
Manchester City	2013–14	Premier League	10	0	5	0	5	0	4	0	—		24	0
Manchester City	Total		107	7	20	0	12	1	20	0	1	1	160	9
West Bromwich Albion	2014–15	Premier League	34	1	3	0	0	0	—		—		37	1
West Bromwich Albion	2015–16	Premier League	2	0	—		—		—		—		2	0
West Bromwich Albion	Total		36	1	3	0	0	0	0	0	0	0	39	1
Aston Villa	2015–16	Premier League	30	1	0	0	1	0	—		—		31	1
Aston Villa	2016–17	Championship	0	0	—		0	0	—		—		0	0
Aston Villa	Total		30	1	0	0	1	0	0	0	0	0	31	1
AEK Athens	2016–17	Super League Greece	4	0	—		—		—		—		4	0
Sunderland	2016–17	Premier League	2	0	—		—		—		—		2	0
Career total			504	36	42	1	30	1	32	2	6	1	614	41

=== International ===
Appearances and goals by national team and year
National team	Year	Apps	Goals
England	2007	4	0
England	2008	2	0
England	2009	3	0
England	2010	3	0
England	2011	2	0
England	2012	10	1
England	2013	2	0
Total		26	1

England score listed first, score column indicates score after each Lescott goal.

List of international goals scored by Joleon Lescott
No.	Date	Venue	Cap	Opponent	Score	Result	Competition	Ref.
1	11 June 2012	Donbas Arena, Donetsk, Ukraine	17	France	1–0	1–1	UEFA Euro 2012	

== Honours ==
Wolverhampton Wanderers

- Football League First Division play-offs: 2003

Everton

- FA Cup runner-up: 2008–09

Manchester City

- Premier League: 2011–12, 2013–14
- FA Cup: 2010–11; runner-up: 2012–13
- Football League Cup: 2013–14

Individual

- Everton Player of the Season: 2007–08
- Everton Players' Player of the Season: 2006–07, 2007–08
- PFA Team of the Year: 2001–02 First Division, 2002–03 First Division, 2005–06 Championship
- Wolverhampton Wanderers Player of the Year: 2002–03, 2004–05
