= Hamdaoui =

Hamdaoui is a Moroccan surname. Notable people with the name include:

- Mohamed Hamdaoui (born 1993), Dutch footballer
- Hicham El Hamdaoui (born 1995), French footballer
- Khalid Hamdaoui (born 1981), Dutch footballer
- Kylan Hamdaoui (born 1994), French rugby union player
- Mounir El Hamdaoui (born 1984), Moroccan footballer
- Oualid El Hamdaoui (born 1993), French footballer
- Youssef Hamdaoui (born 2008), Moroccan footballer
