= Al-Walid (disambiguation) =

Al-Walid is an Arabic name.

Al-Walid or Al-Waleed may also refer to:

- Al Waleed border crossing, between Iraq and Syria
- Al-Waleed (camp), in Iraq near the border with Syria, set up in 2006
