= Walid Kowatli =

Syrian theatre director and playwright

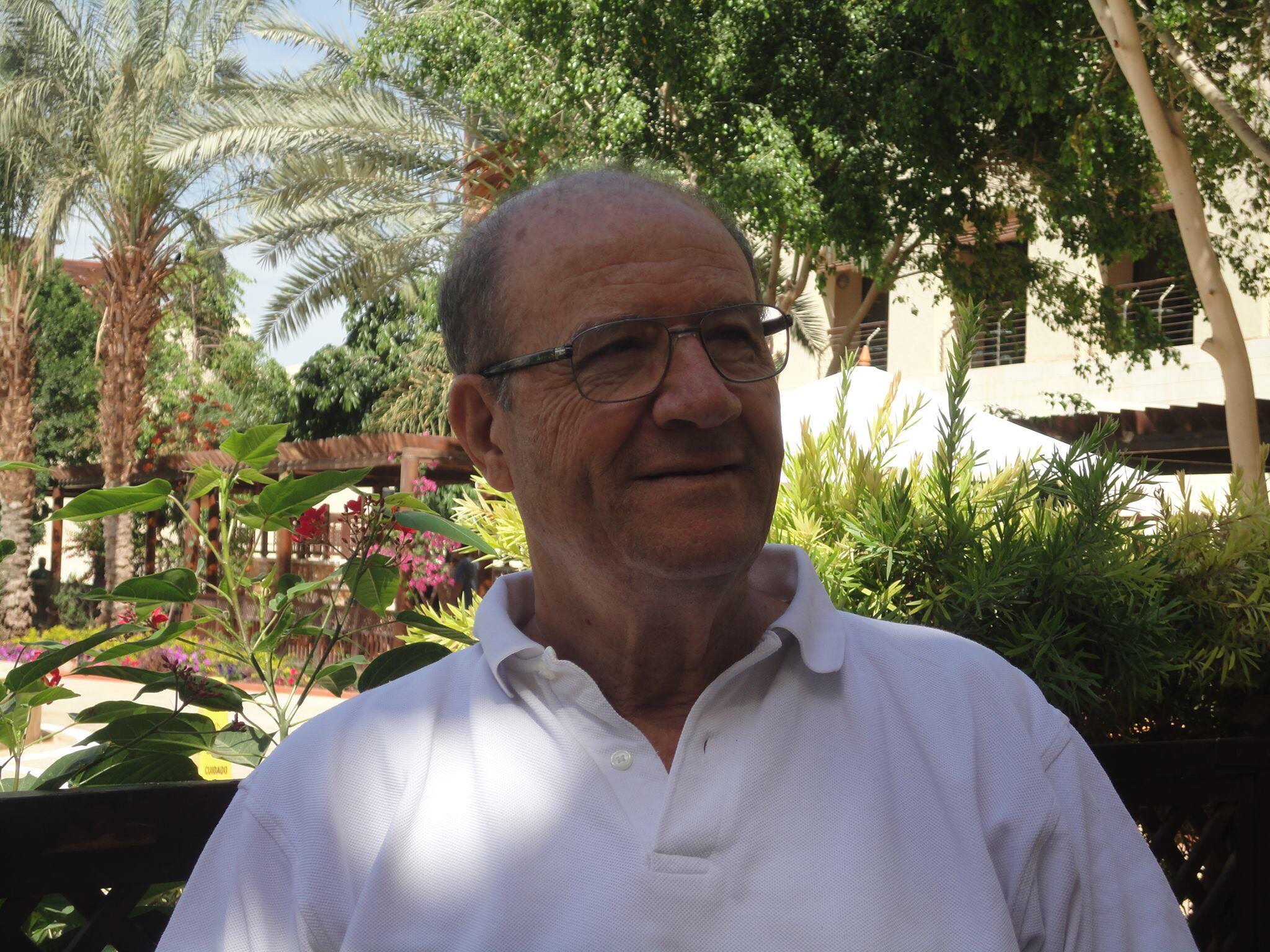
- Born: Damascus, Syria
- Occupations: playwright, director
- Writing career
- Notable works: Lak' bin Lak', Waiting for Barbarians

Walid Kowatli aka Walid Al-Kowatli or Walid Al-Quwatli (Arabic: وليد القوتلي) is a Syrian theatre director and playwright, known for directing the Lak' bin Lak' written by Emile Habibi and Waiting for Barbarians an adaptation of Waiting for the Barbarians poem by Constantine P. Cavafy.

== Early life and education ==
Kowatli was born and grew up in Damascus, Syria. He obtained his degree in Theater Direction from the Institute of Art Studies (Krystov Sarafov, formerly) in Sofia, Bulgaria, class of 1973.

== Career ==
Kowatli headed the Acting Department at the Higher Institute of Dramatic Arts in Damascus from 1991 to 1992, before heading the acting department he joined the institute as a teacher in 1979 to teach the art of acting, the basics of directing and the theater laboratory.

From 1976 to 1999, he was appointed as director at the Department of TV drama in the Syrian Arab TV, where he directed skits and plays the TV a number of them were directed to children and young.

In March 2012, he headed the jury for theater days for the Colleges of Applied Sciences in Oman, and in the sixth Kalba Festival plays short in the UAE in 2017. In the same year, he received the Golden Shield commemorating the Syrian meeting in Dubai.

During the period from 2013 to 2017, he worked on a number of documents addressing Syrian children lost during wartime. His work was presented on stages such as the Syrian National Theater and Al-Kabbani Theater in Damascus and the Sorbonne Theater in Paris.

Kowatli directed nearly 30 predominantly experimental and poetic plays during his tenure in the theater career, and has worked with the rising generation artists in amateur bands such as Waha Al-Raheb.

In 2025, his name was included in the Cambridge Encyclopedia of Theatre Directors.

== Work ==
=== Theatre ===
Plays in Syria
Number	Stage name	Author	General presentation	Place of presentation
1	Topaze	Marcel Bagnol	1974 1974	Al-Shabiba Theater Al Qabbani Theater - Damascus
2	The Zoo Story	Edward Albi	1978	Al Qabbani Theater - Damascus
3	Lak' bin Lak'	Emile Habibi	1981	Workers Theatre - Damascus
4	The Frogs	Aristophan	1981	Al Qabbani Theater - Damascus
5	The Story of Vasco	Georges Schehadé	1982	National Theater - Damascus / graduation project
6	January	Yordan Radychkov	1983	National Theater - Damascus
7	Peace	Adaptation by Walid Kowatli	1985	Al Qabbani Theater - Damascus
8	The King Will Die	Eugène Ionesco	1990	Workers Theatre - Damascus / graduation project
9	The Fox and the Grapes	Guilherme Figueiredo	1991	Higher Institute of Dramatic Arts in Damascus - Damascus
10	Inspired by the Improvised Comedy	Walid Kowatli	1991	Higher Institute of Dramatic Arts in Damascus - Damascus
11	The Lesson	Eugène Ionesco	1992	French Cultural Center
12	Kaspar	Peter Handke	1992	National Theater - Damascus / graduation project
13	The Origin of The Story	Bakr al-Sharqawi	1992	National Theater - Damascus / graduation project
14	Crazy Days	Nikolai Gogol	1994	Al Qabbani Theater - Damascus
15	No Comment	Walid Kowatli	1996	Al Qabbani Theater - Damascus
16	Stories of the Body	Walid Kowatli	1997	Workers Theater - Damascus
17	Eye of the Moon	Walid Kowatli	2004	National Theater - Damascus
18	Waiting (playing with Beckett)	Walid Kowatli	2006	National Theater - Damascus
19	Flight Attempt	Quote Walid Kowatli	2008	Damascus Opera House - Damascus
20	Waiting for Barbarians	Adaptation by Walid Kowatli	2010	Opera House - Damascus
Plays outside Syria
Number	Stage name	Author	General presentation	Place of presentation
1	Lak' bin Lak'	Emile Habibi	1981	Tunisia: Carthage theater
2	Crazy Days	Nikolai Gogol	1995	Arab World Institute - Paris
3	Very Happy Woman Days	Walid Kowatli	1995	Stuttgart - Germany Theater "Camel Sand" - Paris
4	As You Like	Walid Kowatli	1999	Theater of the Sorbonne - Paris Mediterranean Festival: Monfalcon - Italy
5	As You See	Walid Kowatli	2000	The Opposite Bank Festival: The wooden Sword Theater - Paris
6	Curtains and Colors	Walid Kowatli	2003	Sharjah Sixth Interchange: Beit Al Shamsi - Sharjah
7	Violence	Walid Kowatli	2003	A theater workshop for the Department of Culture and Information - Sharjah
8	Waiting (playing with Beckett)	Quote by Walid Kowatli	2006 2008	Amman Theater Festival - Jordan Okinawa Theater Festival - Japan
9	Waiting for Barbarians	Walid Kowatli	2010	Cairo International Festival of Experimental Theater
10	The Seven Days of Time	Nouri al-Jarrah	2012	Doha - Qatar
11	We and the World	Walid Kowatli	2016 2017	Gaziantep - Turkey Istanbul - Turkey

=== Television and documentaries ===
- 2013: The Children of Syria Ascend to Heaven
- 2014: Bird of Fire
- 2015: Baptized with Fire
- 2016: Maram: The Assassination of a Dream

=== Translations ===
- The Fox and the Grapes — play by Guilherme Figueiredo (translated from English)
- Crazy Days — play by Nikolai Gogol (translated from Bulgarian)
- January — play by Yordan Radychkov (translated from Bulgarian)
- The Art of Theater — book by Boris Zakhava (translated from Bulgarian)
- With Water — poet by Salah Stétié (translated from French)
