= Muslim ibn al-Walid =

Arabic poet of the Abbasid era

Abu al-Walīd Muslim ibn al-Walīd al-Anṣārī (Arabic: أبو الوليد مسلم بن الوليد الأنصاري; c. 130 H/748 AD– 207 H/823 AD), also known as Ṣarī‘ al-Ghawānī (Arabic: صريع الغواني, "The One Knocked Down by the Fair"), was among the finest poets of the early Abbasid period, and mawla of the Ansar. As worded by Hilary Kilpatrick, he was patronized by Abbasid dignitaries, one of the first masters of the "refined" badiʿ style, (Note: Quoting S. A. Bonebakker, According to Ibn al-Muʿtazz, badīʿ devices do not appear for the first time in the work of the early Abbasid poets such as Bashshār, Muslim b. al-Walīd and Abū Nuwās; still they are more frequently found in their work than in the poems of the ancients.") best known for wine and love songs, also composed panegyrics.

As worded by the Encyclopedia of Arabic Literature, he was born and brought up in Kufa. He moved to Baghdad in the reign of Harun al-Rashid before the Barmakid debacle of 187 H/794 AD.

He gained favour by Al Fadl bin Sahl, a wazeer in the reign of the seventh Abbasid caliph al-Maʾmūn and was appointed as a postmaster in Jurjān (Gorgan in present-day Iran) by al-Maʾmūn and remained and later in Isfahan. He withdrew from poetry after Al Fadl was murdered and led a lonely life until his death. He is buried in Gorgan.

== Edition and translation ==
- M. J. de Goeje's edition (1875)
- The Diwan of Muslim ibn al-Walid, called Sariʻ al Gawani, translated and commented on by Arthur Wormhoudt. William Penn College. 1981.

== Notes ==
- Poetsgate.com: ديوان صريع الغواني (in Arabic)
