= Jonathan Miles (footballer) =

English footballer (born 1993)

Personal information
- Full name: Jonathan David Miles
- Date of birth: 29 March 1993 (age 33)
- Place of birth: Colchester, England
- Height: 1.88 m (6 ft 2 in)
- Position: Goalkeeper

Team information
- Current team: Haringey Borough

Youth career
- Buckhurst Hill
- 2001–2012: Tottenham Hotspur

Senior career*
Years	Team	Apps	(Gls)
2012–2015	Tottenham Hotspur	0	(0)
2013	→ Dagenham & Redbridge (loan)	2	(0)
2014	→ Whitehawk (loan)	4	(0)
2015–2019	Ebbsfleet United	1	(0)
2016	→ Concord Rangers (loan)	3	(0)
2017	→ Gosport Borough (loan)	2	(0)
2017	→ Margate (loan)	6	(0)
2019	Margate	6	(0)
2019–2020	Ramsgate	10	(0)
2020–	Haringey Borough	12	(0)
- * Club domestic league appearances and goals as of 18:50, 7 May 2020 (UTC)

Jonathan Miles (born 29 March 1993) is an English footballer who plays as a goalkeeper for Haringey Borough who previously had come through the Tottenham Hotspur youth system.

== Club career ==
=== Tottenham Hotspur ===
Born in Colchester, England, Miles first joined Tottenham Hotspur as an under-9 player, joining from non-league club Buckhurst Hill. He played eight times in the 2011–12 NextGen Series. He also made 11 appearances for the Spurs Under-18s in 2010–11 as he shared goalkeeping duties with Jordan Archer. Miles signed a 1-year professional contract with Tottenham Hotspur at the end of the 2012–13 season, he signed a year extension for 2013–14, and was offered a new one-year deal with the club for 2014–15.

==== Loan to Dagenham & Redbridge ====
On 28 March 2013, Miles joined Dagenham & Redbridge on loan until the end of the season. On his 20th birthday, 29 March 2013, he made his League debut and kept a clean sheet against Barnet. On 1 April 2013, he played again losing 4–2 against Bristol Rovers.

=== Ebbsfleet United ===
Miles is now signed with Ebbsfleet United for the 2015–2016 season.

=== Later career ===
At the end of May 2019, Miles signed with Ramsgate who he played for on loan in 2017. He made six appearances for the club, before joining Ramsgate in October 2019. On 5 January 2020, he joined Haringey Borough.

== Career statistics ==
As of match played 24 October 2017

Appearances and goals by club, season and competition
Club	Season	League			FA Cup		League Cup		Other		Total	
Club	Season	Division	Apps	Goals	Apps	Goals	Apps	Goals	Apps	Goals	Apps	Goals
Dagenham & Redbridge (loan)	2012–13	League Two	2	0	—		—		—		2	0
Whitehawk (loan)	2013–14	Conference South	4	0	—		—		—		4	0
Whitehawk (loan)	2015–16	National League South	0	0	1	0	—		0	0	1	0
Concord Rangers (loan)	2016–17	National League South	3	0	0	0	—		0	0	3	0
Gosport Borough (loan)	2016–17	National League South	2	0	0	0	—		0	0	2	0
Margate (loan)	2016–17	National League South	6	0	0	0	—		0	0	6	0
Career Total			17	0	1	0	—		0	0	18	0
