= Oualid El Hamdaoui =

French footballer (born 1993)

Personal information
- Date of birth: 5 February 1993 (age 33)
- Place of birth: Bagnols-sur-Cèze, France
- Height: 1.89 m (6 ft 2 in)
- Position: Forward

Team information
- Current team: Luzenac AP

Senior career*
Years	Team	Apps	(Gls)
2010–2012	Nancy B	12	(0)
2012–2013	Istres	2	(0)
2013–2014	COD Meknès	?	(?)
2014–2015	Fabrègues	25	(9)
2015–2016	Sète	9	(3)
2016	Rigas FS		
2016–2017	Aviron Bayonnais		
2017	Toulouse Rodéo		
2017–	Luzenac AP		
- * Club domestic league appearances and goals as of 8 November 2017

Oualid El Hamdaoui (born 5 February 1993) is a French professional footballer, who plays as a forward for Latvian club FK RFS.

== Career ==
El Hamdaoui played twelve games for the reserve team of AS Nancy B., before joined to Ligue 2 side FC Istres. He played only two games in the Ligue 2 for Istres. El Hamdaoui played since summer 2013 for Moroccan side COD Meknès.

== Personal life ==
Born in France, El Hamdaoui is of Moroccan descent.
