= 1996–97 Plymouth Argyle F.C. season =

English football club season

Plymouth Argyle
1996–97 season
- Chairman: Dan McCauley
- Manager: Neil Warnock (until 3 February); Mick Jones (from 3 February)
- Stadium: Home Park
- Second Division: 19th
- FA Cup: Third round
- League Cup: First round
- Auto Windscreens Shield: Quarter finals
- Top goalscorer: League: Evans (12); All: Evans (15)
- Average home league attendance: 6,494
Home colours

During the 1996–97 English football season, Plymouth Argyle F.C. competed in the Football League Second Division.

== Season summary ==
In the 1996–97 season, Plymouth manager Warnock was sacked within a year as the club narrowly avoided being relegated back to the basement division. Warnock's assistant Mick Jones became his successor.

In February 1997, Plymouth participated in "The Battle of Saltergate" – in a 2–1 win at Chesterfield, a fight broke out in the 88th minute, involving all 20 outfield players. Chesterfield's Darren Carr and Kevin Davies and Plymouth's Tony James and Richard Logan were all sent-off. To make matters even worse, Argyle's Wembley hero Ronnie Mauge had already been sent-off in the 36th minute. It was the first time in Football League history that five players were sent off in one game.

== Final league table ==
Pos	Team	Pld	W	D	L	GF	GA	GD	Pts	Promotion or relegation
17	Bristol Rovers	46	15	11	20	47	50	−3	56	
18	Wycombe Wanderers	46	15	10	21	51	57	−6	55	
19	Plymouth Argyle	46	12	18	16	47	58	−11	54	
20	York City	46	13	13	20	47	68	−21	52	
21	Peterborough United (R)	46	11	14	21	55	73	−18	47	Relegation to the Third Division

Rules for classification: In the Football League goals scored (GF) takes precedence over goal difference (GD).
(R) Relegated

== Results ==
Plymouth Argyle's score comes first

=== Legend ===
Win	Draw	Loss

=== Football League Second Division ===
Date	Opponent	Venue	Result	Attendance	Scorers
17 August 1996	York City	H	2–1	9,035	Corazzin, Heathcote
24 August 1996	Wrexham	A	4–4	3,920	Evans, Littlejohn (2), Logan
27 August 1996	Watford	A	2–0	7,349	Billy, Littlejohn
30 August 1996	Preston North End	H	2–1	9,209	Evans, Logan
7 September 1996	Notts County	H	0–0	8,109	
10 September 1996	Brentford	A	2–3	5,377	Mauge, Corazzin
14 September 1996	Stockport County	A	1–3	5,087	Evans (pen)
21 September 1996	Bristol Rovers	H	0–1	8,879	
28 September 1996	Crewe Alexandra	A	0–3	3,797	
1 October 1996	Peterborough United	H	1–1	4,929	James
5 October 1996	Millwall	H	0–0	7,507	
12 October 1996	Walsall	A	1–0	3,720	Littlejohn
15 October 1996	Bournemouth	A	0–1	3,818	
19 October 1996	Bristol City	H	0–0	9,645	
26 October 1996	Burnley	A	1–2	9,602	Evans
29 October 1996	Gillingham	H	2–0	4,787	Evans, Illman
2 November 1996	Luton Town	H	3–3	7,134	Mauge, Evans (2, 1 pen)
9 November 1996	Wycombe Wanderers	A	1–2	5,456	Williams
19 November 1996	Chesterfield	H	0–3	4,237	
23 November 1996	Bury	A	0–1	3,582	
30 November 1996	Burnley	H	0–0	6,289	
3 December 1996	Blackpool	A	2–2	2,690	Wotton, Littlejohn
14 December 1996	Shrewsbury Town	H	2–2	5,075	Mauge, Evans
21 December 1996	Rotherham United	A	2–1	2,269	Illman, Evans
26 December 1996	Brentford	H	1–4	9,525	Illman
11 January 1997	Crewe Alexandra	H	1–0	4,767	Logan
18 January 1997	Peterborough United	A	0–0	6,288	
25 January 1997	Gillingham	A	1–4	5,465	Evans
1 February 1997	Wycombe Wanderers	H	0–0	5,024	
8 February 1997	Luton Town	A	2–2	6,439	Littlejohn, Evans
15 February 1997	Bury	H	2–0	5,486	Logan, Corazzin
22 February 1997	Chesterfield	A	2–1	5,833	Evans, Saunders
25 February 1997	Bristol Rovers	A	0–2	6,005	
1 March 1997	Blackpool	H	0–1	5,585	
8 March 1997	Rotherham United	H	1–0	4,717	Corazzin (pen)
15 March 1997	Shrewsbury Town	A	3–2	3,414	Billy (2), Illman
22 March 1997	Wrexham	H	0–1	5,468	
29 March 1997	York City	A	1–1	3,917	Corazzin
31 March 1997	Watford	H	0–0	6,836	
5 April 1997	Preston North End	A	1–1	8,503	Saunders
8 April 1997	Stockport County	H	0–0	5,089	
12 April 1997	Millwall	A	0–0	5,702	
15 April 1997	Notts County	A	1–2	2,423	Collins
19 April 1997	Walsall	H	2–0	5,535	Saunders, Barlow
26 April 1997	Bristol City	A	1–3	15,368	Williams
3 May 1997	Bournemouth	H	0–0	6,507	

=== FA Cup ===
Round	Date	Opponent	Venue	Result	Attendance	Goalscorers
R1	16 November 1996	Fulham	H	5–0	7,104	Mauge, Evans (2, 1 pen), Littlejohn, Corazzin
R2	6 December 1996	Exeter City	H	4–1	12,911	Evans, Mauge, Billy, Littlejohn
R3	4 January 1997	Peterborough United	H	0–1	7,299	

=== League Cup ===
Round	Date	Opponent	Venue	Result	Attendance	Goalscorers
R1 1st Leg	20 August 1996	Brentford	A	0–1	3,034	
R1 2nd Leg	3 September 1996	Brentford	H	0–0 (lost 0–1 on agg)	5,180	

=== Football League Trophy ===
Round	Date	Opponent	Venue	Result	Attendance	Goalscorers
SR1	10 December 1996	Bournemouth	H	2–0	944	Illman, Wotton
SR2	14 January 1997	Brighton & Hove Albion	H	1–0	1,295	Wotton
SQF	11 February 1997	Northampton Town	H	0–2	1,499	

== Players ==
=== First-team squad ===
Squad at end of season

Note: Flags indicate national team as defined under FIFA eligibility rules; some limited exceptions apply. Players may hold more than one non-FIFA nationality.

No.	Pos.	Nation	Player
—	GK	(England) ENG	Kevin Blackwell
—	GK	(England) ENG	James Dungey
—	GK	(Zimbabwe) ZIM	Bruce Grobbelaar (Note: Grobbelaar was born in Durban, South Africa, but was raised in Rhodesia (now Zimbabwe) from the age of two months and made his international debut for Rhodesia in 1977 and Zimbabwe in 1980.)
—	DF	(England) ENG	Jon Beswetherick
—	DF	(England) ENG	Simon Collins
—	DF	(England) ENG	Chris Curran
—	DF	(England) ENG	Mick Heathcote
—	DF	(England) ENG	Tony James
—	DF	(England) ENG	Richard Logan
—	DF	(England) ENG	Mark Patterson
—	DF	(Wales) WAL	Jason Rowbotham
—	DF	(England) ENG	Paul Williams
—	MF	(England) ENG	Martin Barlow
—	MF	(England) ENG	Chris Billy

No.	Pos.	Nation	Player
—	MF	(England) ENG	Gary Clayton
—	MF	(England) ENG	Chris Leadbitter
—	MF	(England) ENG	Ronnie Mauge (Note: Mauge was born in Islington, England, but also qualified to represent Trinidad and Tobago internationally and made his international debut for Trinidad and Tobago in 2000.)
—	MF	(England) ENG	Steve Perkins
—	MF	(England) ENG	Mark Saunders
—	MF	(England) ENG	Michael Simpson (on loan from Notts County)
—	MF	(England) ENG	Paul Wotton
—	FW	(Canada) CAN	Carlo Corazzin
—	FW	(England) ENG	Mickey Evans (Note: Evans was born in Plymouth, England, but also qualified to represent the Republic of Ireland internationally and made his international debut for the Republic of Ireland in October 1997.)
—	FW	(England) ENG	Neil Illman
—	FW	(England) ENG	Adrian Littlejohn
—	FW	(England) ENG	Lee Phillips
—	FW	(England) ENG	Dominic Richardson
