= 1997–98 Plymouth Argyle F.C. season =

English football club season

Plymouth Argyle
1997–98 season
- Chairman: Dan McCauley
- Manager: Mick Jones
- Stadium: Home Park
- Division Two: 22nd (relegated)
- FA Cup: First round
- Football League Cup: First round
- Football League Trophy: First round
- Top goalscorer: League: Carlo Corazzin (17); All: Carlo Corazzin (17)
- Highest home attendance: 9,469 vs Fulham (26 Dec 97)
- Lowest home attendance: 2,993 vs Wycombe (4 Nov 97)
- Average home league attendance: 5,322
Home colours

The 1997–98 season was the 103rd season in the history of Plymouth Argyle Football Club, their 73rd in the Football League,

== Players ==
=== First-team squad ===
Squad at end of season

Note: Flags indicate national team as defined under FIFA eligibility rules; some limited exceptions apply. Players may hold more than one non-FIFA nationality.

No.	Pos.	Nation	Player
—	GK	ENG	Jon Sheffield
—	DF	ENG	Simon Collins
—	DF	ENG	Paul Williams
—	MF	ENG	Ronnie Mauge (Note: Mauge was born in Islington, England, but also qualified to represent Trinidad and Tobago internationally and made his international debut for Trinidad and Tobago in 2000.)
—	MF	ENG	Mark Saunders
—	DF	ENG	Mick Heathcote (captain)
—	DF	WAL	Jason Rowbotham
—	DF	ENG	Paul Wotton
—	MF	ENG	Martin Barlow
—	MF	ENG	Darren Currie
—	FW	LCA	Earl Jean

No.	Pos.	Nation	Player
—	MF	ENG	Richard Logan
—	MF	ENG	Lee Phillips
—	FW	ENG	Phil Starbuck
—	FW	IRL	Barry Conlon (on loan from Manchester City)
—	FW	ENG	Adrian Littlejohn
—	FW	ENG	Danny O'Hagan
—	FW	CAN	Carlo Corazzin
—	MF	ENG	Graham Anthony
—	MF	ENG	Chris Billy
—	MF	ENG	Neil Illman
—	FW	ENG	Padi Wilson
—	DF	ENG	Jon Ashton
—	DF	ENG	Jon Beswetherick

=== Left club during season ===
Note: Flags indicate national team as defined under FIFA eligibility rules; some limited exceptions apply. Players may hold more than one non-FIFA nationality.

No.	Pos.	Nation	Player
—	DF	ENG	Steve Woods (on loan from Stoke City)
—	MF	ENG	Gary Clayton (to Torquay United)

No.	Pos.	Nation	Player
—	MF	ENG	Lee Hodges (on loan from West Ham United)

== Second Division ==
=== Final standings ===
Pos	Team	Pld	W	D	L	GF	GA	GD	Pts	Promotion or relegation
20	Burnley	46	13	13	20	55	65	−10	52	
21	Brentford (R)	46	11	17	18	50	71	−21	50	Relegation to the Third Division
22	Plymouth Argyle (R)	46	12	13	21	55	70	−15	49	Relegation to the Third Division
23	Carlisle United (R)	46	12	8	26	57	73	−16	44	Relegation to the Third Division
24	Southend United (R)	46	11	10	25	47	79	−32	43	Relegation to the Third Division

Rules for classification: In the Football League goals scored (GF) takes precedence over goal difference (GD).
(R) Relegated

=== Results by round ===
Round	1	2	3	4	5	6	7	8	9	10	11	12	13	14	15	16	17	18	19	20	21	22	23	24	25	26	27	28	29	30	31	32	33	34	35	36	37	38	39	40	41	42	43	44	45	46
Ground	A	H	A	H	H	A	H	A	H	A	A	H	H	A	A	H	H	A	A	H	D	H	A	H	A	H	A	H	A	H	H	A	A	H	A	H	A	H	A	H	A	H	A	H	H	A
Result	D	D	D	D	L	L	D	D	W	L	L	L	D	L	W	W	W	L	D	L	D	W	L	L	D	L	L	W	L	W	D	W	L	L	D	W	L	W	L	W	L	W	D	L	L	L
Position	19	13	17	16	20	21	23	21	21	22	22	23	23	24	23	20	18	17	17	18	20	20	20	20	21	23	23	21	23	21	21	19	19	21	21	20	22	19	19	19	21	20	20	20	21	22

Source: Statto.com
A = Away; H = Home; W = Win; D = Draw; L = Loss

=== Matches ===
Win	Draw	Loss

Date	Opponent	Venue	Result F–A	Scorers	Attendance
9 August 1997	Bristol Rovers	Away	1–1	Heathcote	7,386
16 August 1997	Grimsby Town	Home	2–2	Logan, Littlejohn	6,002
23 August 1997	Wigan Athletic	Away	1–1	Logan	3,761
30 August 1997	Chesterfield	Away	1–1	Jean	5,284
2 September 1997	Watford	Home	0–1		5,141
9 September 1997	Fulham	Away	2–0		5,141
13 September 1997	Brentford	Home	0–0		4,394
20 September 1997	Carlisle United	Away	2–2	Littlejohn, Wilson	5,667
27 September 1997	Walsall	Home	2–1	Barlow (2)	6,207
4 October 1997	York City	Away	1–0		2,894
11 October 1997	Luton Town	Away	3–0		4,931
18 October 1997	Southend United	Home	2–3	Littlejohn, Corazzin	3,430
21 October 1997	Burnley	Home	2–2	Jean, Heathcote	3,006
25 October 1997	Gillingham	Away	2–1	Jean	6,679
1 November 1997	Preston North End	Away	0–1	Corazzin	8,405
4 November 1997	Wycombe Wanderers	Home	4–2	Corazzin (2), Littlejohn, Mauge	2,993
8 November 1997	Bournemouth	Home	3–0	Jean, Littlejohn (2)	5,067
18 November 1997	Bristol City	Away	2–1	Corazzin	10,867
22 November 1997	Wrexham	Away	1–1	Corazzin	3,641
29 November 1997	Oldham Athletic	Home	0–2		5,452
2 December 1997	Blackpool	Away	0–0		3,281
13 December 1997	Millwall	Home	3–0	Collins, Billy, Corazzin	4,460
20 December 1997	Northampton Town	Away	2–1	Corazzin	5,546
26 December 1997	Fulham	Home	1–4	Barlow	9,469
28 December 1997	Watford	Away	1–1	Saunders	11,594
10 January 1998	Bristol Rovers	Home	1–2	Corazzin	6,850
17 January 1998	Chesterfield	Away	2–1	Corazzin	3,879
24 January 1998	Wigan Athletic	Home	3–1	Saunders, Barlow, Collins	4,345
31 January 1998	Brentford	Away	3–1	Corazzin	4,783
7 February 1998	Carlisle United	Home	2–1	Heathcote, Corazzin	4,540
14 February 1998	York City	Home	0–0		4,382
21 February 1998	Walsall	Away	0–1	Heathcote	4,612
24 February 1998	Southend United	Away	3–0		4,363
28 February 1998	Luton Town	Home	0–2		4,846
3 March 1998	Bournemouth	Away	3–3	Saunders, Logan, Corazzin	3,545
7 March 1998	Preston North End	Home	2–0	Wotton, Conlon	4,201
14 March 1998	Wycombe Wanderers	Away	5–1	Corazzin	5,508
21 March 1998	Bristol City	Home	2–0	Saunders, Conlon	7,622
24 March 1998	Grimsby Town	Away	1–0		4,661
28 March 1998	Wrexham	Home	2–0	Corazzin, Saunders	4,749
4 April 1998	Oldham Athletic	Away	2–0		4,244
11 April 1998	Blackpool	Home	3–1	own-goal, Logan, Corazzin	5,655
13 April 1998	Millwall	Away	1–1	Corazzin	5,496
18 April 1998	Northampton Town	Home	1–3	Saunders	6,389
25 April 1998	Gillingham	Home	0-1		7,941
2 May 1998	Burnley	Away	2–1	Saunders	18,811

== FA Cup ==
Win	Draw	Loss

Date	Round	Opponent	Venue	Result F–A	Scorers	Attendance
15 November 1997	First round	Cambridge United	Home	0–0		4,793
24 November 1997	First round replay	Cambridge United	Away	2–3		

== Football League Cup ==
Win	Draw	Loss

Date	Round	Opponent	Venue	Result F–A	Scorers	Attendance
12 August 1998	First round, first leg	Oxford United	Away	0–2		5,083
26 August 1998	First round, second leg	Oxford United	Home	3–5		3,037

== Football League Trophy ==
Win	Draw	Loss

Date	Round	Opponent	Venue	Result F–A	Scorers	Attendance
9 December 1997	First round	Northampton Town	Away	1–1 (3–5 p)		2,631
