= History of Plymouth Argyle F.C. =

History of an English football club

Plymouth Argyle Football Club is an English professional football club based in Plymouth, Devon. This article covers its history, from the club's formation in 1886 to the present day.

== Foundation, formation and the early years ==
Pilgrim Pete, club mascot, performs traditional comedic trip in front of the away fans.

The club was founded in 1886 as Argyle Football Club, the first match taking place on 16 October 1886 against Caxton, a team from Cornwall and saw the Pilgrims lose 2–0. Later that week Argyle won for the first time–beating Dunheved College (now Launceston College) in Launceston (where many of the club's first members had been educated) 2–1. They played several friendlies against Plymouth United, but poor performances on the pitch led to the club going out of existence in 1894 before being resurrected in 1897 as one part of a general sports club, the Argyle Athletic Club. In 1898, Argyle F.C. produced its first rulebook. The club's ground was given as Marsh Mills, an area on the edge of the city of Plymouth.

Much speculation surrounds the origin of the name Argyle. One explanation is that the club was named after the Argyll and Sutherland Highlanders, an army regiment with a strong football side of its own. Another theory is given by the local geography–suggesting the name comes either from the nearby public house, The Argyle Tavern, where the founder members may have met, or from a local street Argyle Terrace.

The club adopted its current name when it became fully professional in 1903 joining the Southern League, under the management of Bob Jack. Argyle's first professional game was on 1 September 1903 against West Ham United resulting in a 2–0 win for Argyle with the first goal being scored by Jack Peddie. Their first home game as a fully professional club was on 5 September 1903 when they beat Northampton Town 2–0 in front of a crowd of 4,438. Argyle won the Southern League in 1913, then in 1920 entered the Football League Third Division as a founder member, where they finished 11th in their first season.

Chart of table positions of Plymouth Argyle in the Football League

In the summer of 1924, a Plymouth Argyle team visited South America to play some exhibition football against Argentina and Uruguay. Argyle thrashed Uruguay national team 4–0 in their first game (Uruguay went on to win the first ever World Cup just six years later) before pulling off another shock by beating Argentina national team 1–0. They then held Argentinean giants Boca Juniors to a credible 1–1 draw. Moses Russell captained the side and played in all nine matches. Russell's style of play caught the attention of the Argentine press; at the end of the tour 'The Standard of Buenos Aires' commented:

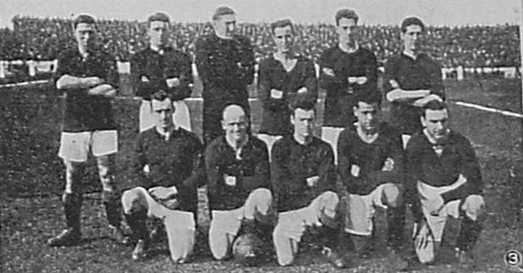
A Plymouth Argyle team during the tour on South America, 1924

"The visit of Plymouth Argyle will be best remembered by the personality and genius of Moses Russell. His style, judgement, clearances, kicking and no less useful work with his head...one of the most wonderful backs and one of the smartest players ever seen on the football field."

In the match against Boca Juniors on 9 July 1924, the Boca Juniors supporters invaded the pitch after their team had scored the opening goal and carried all eleven home players shoulder high around the stadium. After a half-hour delay, the referee restarted the match, but a further invasion was sparked when the referee awarded a penalty against the home side. When the match was again restarted, the Argyle players had agreed that Patsy Corcoran would take the spot-kick and miss, to prevent another pitch invasion. However, the ultra-competitive Russell was not prepared to accept this, and just before Corcoran was about to take the penalty he was pushed aside by Russell who took it himself and scored. This prompted a further pitch invasion by the Boca fans and this time the match was abandoned.

Back in England, between 1921–22 and 1926–27, Argyle missed promotion when they finished second in the Third Division South for six consecutive seasons. Argyle eventually won promotion to Football League Division Two in 1929–30, when they topped the Third Division South, with attendances that season regularly reaching 20,000. Manager Bob Jack resigned in 1937, having spent a grand total of 27 years in charge of the Pilgrims.

Eleven years earlier in 1928, David Jack, who began his career with Argyle in 1919 but left in 1920, joined Arsenal F.C. from Bolton Wanderers for a fee of £10,890 – which made him the most expensive player in the world at the time. He was also the first player to score at Wembley Stadium.

== The 1950s ==
After the Second World War Argyle's 20-year stay in Division Two came to an end in 1950–despite the efforts of inspirational captain Jack Chisholm. However, they were back in Division Two before long, after winning the Third Division South in 1952. The closest they ever came to playing in the Football League First Division (top tier) was in 1952–53, when they reached fourth place in the Football League Second Division, their highest finish to date. In the 1954–1955 season floodlights arrived at Home Park, but in 1956 Argyle went down again. The Pilgrim's reputation as a 'yo-yo club' continued after they won Division Three–by now a national league–in 1959.

== The 1960s ==
The 1960s started with one of the most bizarre events in Argyle's history. It came in the spring of 1963, when they went on a mini-tour of Poland—the Pilgrims were invited to play a game as a warm-up to an international cycle race. Amazingly, 100,000 saw Argyle that day—the biggest crowd ever to attend a Plymouth match.

In 1965 Argyle reached the Football League Cup semi-final, as a 2nd division team, for the first time in their history, but lost to Leicester City.

But the decade ended disappointingly as Argyle returned to Division Three after relegation in 1968.

== The 1970s–Pelé comes to Plymouth ==
In March 1973 a memorable moment in Argyle's history was witnessed by 37,639 people at Home Park. Argyle played a friendly match against Brazilian giants Santos FC, who at the time were one of the best teams in the world. That day Santos also had arguably the best footballer of all time in their starting line-up – Pelé. However, Argyle, then a Third Division side, shocked the world with a 3–2 win. The Greens were actually 3–0 up at one stage (thanks to goals from Mike Dowling, Derek Rickard and Jimmy Hinch) but a penalty scored at the Barn Park End by Pelé helped a Santos fightback. However, in the end they came up short and were defeated. There was a huge pitch invasion at the final whistle after a win for The Pilgrims.

In 1974 – with future England striker and Argyle manager Paul Mariner now playing for them – Argyle again reached the League Cup semi-final, this time as a Third Division side. Argyle drew the first leg against Manchester City 1–1, but lost the Maine Road encounter 2–0.

After spending six years in Division Three, Argyle finally returned to Division Two in 1974–75, under the management of Tony Waiters. This was mainly thanks to strike partners Paul Mariner and Billy Rafferty, who scored a very impressive 46 goals between them.

However, they were back down again in 1977. Although the decade did end on a high note–in 1978–79 Kevin Hodges made his Argyle debut, and he went on to play 620 games for the club–more than anyone else.

== 1984 Cup run ==
In 1984 Plymouth reached the FA Cup semi-final despite being in the Third Division. After a successful cup run in which they beat West Bromwich Albion, a top division team at the time (1–0 courtesy of a Tommy Tynan goal after 58 minutes), and Derby County (the first game ended 0–0, but Argyle won the replay 0–1 at the Baseball Ground), they lost 1–0 to Watford in the semi-final at Villa Park courtesy of a George Reilly goal. However, manager John Hore was sacked the following campaign and was replaced by Dave Smith.

In 2007, Argyle got to the quarter-finals of the FA Cup, but lost 1–0 to Watford at Home Park. In the buildup to this game, many pundits and fans relived the semi-final the two teams played 23 years ago.

== Success under Smith ==
In 1985–86, Smith's first full season in charge, Argyle finished as runners-up in Division Three, resulting in promotion. The following season, despite being a newly promoted team, Argyle finished a respectable 7th place in Division Two, thereby only just missing the division's new play-off zone and the chance to move to the First Division (now the Premier League). In 1988 Smith surprisingly left to take charge of Dundee, making way for Ken Brown to become manager.

== The 1990s–ups and downs ==
In the 1990s a new face took over the club: Businessman Dan McCauley became chairman, and his first major decision was to sack Dave Kemp and appoint England's record cap holder Peter Shilton as player-manager in the 1991–92 season. But Shilton was unable to prevent relegation as Argyle finished 22nd in Division Two.

Ahead of the 1992–93 season, English football had a revamp. The First Division (top tier) became the Premiership, Division Two (second tier) became Division One, Division Three (third tier) was now Division Two and so on. As a result, Argyle were still in Division Two, but it was now the third tier instead of the second.

In 1992–93 Argyle finished in mid-table in the third tier, but Peter Shilton's side finished third the following campaign (as a result of playing some excellent football), thereby qualifying for the play-offs. But Argyle were defeated in the semi-final by Burnley, which saw the start of a fierce rivalry between the two clubs. The Pilgrims suffered even more disappointment in 1994–95 as Shilton parted company with the club, and they were eventually relegated to Division Three (fourth tier) for the first time in their history. Player Steve McCall became the club's manager on a short-term deal after Shilton's departure, but at the end of the season his contract was not renewed and Neil Warnock stepped in as his successor.

== Up, then down again ==
At the end of the 1995–96 season, Warnock took Plymouth to Division Three play-off glory in his first campaign as manager, with the semi-final being a memorable affair. Argyle played Colchester United and were 1–0 down from the 1st leg, but won 3–1 at Home Park in the 2nd, meaning the Pilgrims were going to Wembley for the first time in their history. A header from Ronnie Mauge on 65 minutes gave Argyle a 1–0 win over Darlington at the national team's stadium.

But Warnock was sacked within a year as the club narrowly avoided being relegated back to the basement division. Mick Jones became his successor, and, that season, in February 1997 Argyle participated in 'The Battle of Saltergate' – in a 1–2 win at Chesterfield, an 88th minute fight broke out, involving all 20 outfield players. Chesterfield's Darren Carr and Kevin Davies and Plymouth's Tony James and Richard Logan were all sent-off. To make matters even worse, Argyle's Wembley hero Ronnie Mauge had already been sent-off in the 36th minute. It was the first time in Football League history that five players were sent-off in one game.

The following season Argyle went down under Jones, and his successor Kevin Hodges (the club's record appearance holder) lasted three years before a failure to attain promotion (or even a play-off place) cost him his job. At this point Argyle were in danger of going bust, and it was the lowest point in their history.

== The Sturrock revolution ==
The appointment of Paul Sturrock as manager in November 2000 marked a turning point in Argyle's history. He saved the club from relegation out of the Football League (they were fourth from bottom when he became manager), and finished 12th in his first season.

The following campaign proved to be the most successful in the club's history, as they went on to win the Division Three title. Although the season did not start well for the Greens after defeats against Shrewsbury Town (0–1), Watford (0–1, League Cup) and Rochdale (1–2). But Argyle's first win of 2001–02 came in style, as they came from 2–0 down to win 3–2 at Rushden & Diamonds. Argyle were then unbeaten in the league for another 19 games before losing 2–1 at Scunthorpe United. On 17 November, Plymouth faced non-League Whitby Town in the FA Cup first round and were held to a 1–1 draw, and only just beat them 3–2 in the replay at Home Park. Nonetheless, their excellent league form continued, and promotion was sealed with two games to spare as Argyle won 1–4 at Darlington. On the last day of the season, Argyle defeated Cheltenham Town 2–0 to finish the season with a club and league record of 102 points to clinch the Division Three title. It also saw goalkeeper Romain Larrieu (and the team) gain a club record 28 'clean sheets' that season.

In 2002–03, they narrowly missed out on the Division Two play-off, finishing two places outside it in eighth. That season started well for them, but some disappointing results against several teams near the bottom of the table saw them finish 16 points off sixth place. Plymouth's best result saw them hammer Peterborough United 6–1 in March.

Argyle were one of the favourites to win the Division Two title ahead of the 2003–04 season, and they proved everyone right as they earned their second promotion in three years. In the early stages of the campaign Argyle were hanging around the mid-table. But a run in October saw the Pilgrims climb into first place. They thumped Tranmere Rovers 6–0 at home before a 4–0 win against local rivals Bristol City in the Football League Trophy. Sturrock's side then won 5–1 at fellow high-flyers Port Vale, and a 3–1 win at Sheffield Wednesday put the Greens top. On 3 January, Argyle picked up their joint record win after beating Chesterfield 7–0, scoring the fastest five goals in English football (after just 17 minutes). But Sturrock surprisingly moved to Southampton in March 2004, meaning Kevin Summerfield briefly took charge of the club, but Bobby Williamson was appointed manager soon after. Promotion as Division Two champions was perhaps uniquely, in Plymouth's first game under the management of Williamson – a 2–0 defeat of Queens Park Rangers in which Mickey Evans and David Friio both scored in the final nine minutes of the game.

== Argyle in the Championship ==
Argyle's first game in the newly re-branded 'Championship' (second tier) saw them draw 0–0 at home to Millwall, who were FA Cup finalists the season before. Argyle's strong start continued, and they sat top of the table – their highest ever position – briefly after a 0–1 win at Cardiff City. But their impressive run failed to continue as a long string of defeats followed, although they did win with a 0–2 win at Wigan Athletic (who eventually finished second and won promotion) and a 3–0 success over Sheffield United. Plymouth's biggest win of 2004–05, resulted in a 5–1 home win against Brighton in March. The club secured survival five games before the end of the season with a 0–3 win away to Nottingham Forest, and eventually finished 17th, five places (but only three points) above the drop zone.

The 2005–06 season started with a 1–2 win at Reading (who went on to win the league with 106 points, and only lost twice), as striker Nick Chadwick scored in the dying moments of the game. But after that Argyle struggled, and Bobby Williamson was sacked as manager. His assistant, Jocky Scott, became caretaker manager, but his reign started with a 2–0 loss at Norwich City, before gaining a 1–1 draw at Home Park against fellow relegation rivals Crewe Alexandra. The next game saw the Pilgrims earn only their second win of the season with a 1–0 win over rivals Burnley, with veteran striker Mickey Evans scoring a 46th-minute goal. Scott's final game in charge resulted in a 2–1 loss at League Two side Barnet in the second round of the League Cup. Tony Pulis was appointed manager just a few days later, and his first game in charge was a 0–0 draw away at Southampton. It was Argyle's first point at Southampton for 28 years. That was followed by a 2–0 defeat at Sheffield United, who went on to earn promotion to the Premier League that season, and that result saw the Pilgrims slip into the relegation zone. But the turning point in Argyle's season was on 1 October, and was a 2–1 win at home to Pulis's former club Stoke City, as Hungarian international Akos Buzsaky scored a 77th-minute winner. On 17 December, Nick Chadwick scored Argyle's fastest ever goal after 11 seconds against Crystal Palace, and Tony Capaldi scored another in the last few second of the game to make it 2–0. Many believe that these two consecutive goals are the most widely separated in any football match. But Pulis gained a reputation for being a boring manager, as most of Argyle's games ended in scoreless draws or narrow wins. Argyle's biggest win of the season was a 3–1 success at home to Coventry City, and that game also saw on-loan striker Vincent Pericard score a hat trick on his full debut. Some memorable results for the Green Army that season was the 2–0 win against high-flying Wolverhampton Wanderers and a 0–0 draw at Leeds United, who went on to reach the play-off final at the Millennium Stadium but lost 3–0 to Watford.

The final game of the campaign was also the last striker, Mickey Evans would play for Argyle, in a home game against Ipswich Town. With the score at 1–1, Evans scored with a header on 57 minutes to give Argyle a win. In total, Evans played 432 times for his home town club (in two spells) scoring 81 goals. The Pilgrims finished 14th that season, in the end well clear of the relegation zone.

However, Pulis was on his way out of the exit door very soon, returning to Stoke to make way for Ian Holloway to join the club.

In summer 2006, in one of Holloway's first games in charge of the club, Argyle played a pre-season friendly against nine-time European champions Real Madrid in Austria, as both clubs were training in the country at the time. Argyle, captained by Hasney Aljofree, put up a brave fight and only lost 1–0, courtesy of a 75th-minute penalty converted by Brazilian international Júlio Baptista. Madrid were managed by future England manager Fabio Capello and they had Iván Helguera, Guti, Antonio Cassano, Raúl Bravo, Thomas Gravesen and Javier Portillo in their starting line-up. The official Plymouth Argyle website said that it was 'a proud day for anyone with green in their heart'.

In late 2006, Viz magazine published a one-off comic strip, "The Pirates of Plymouth Argyle", depicting Plymouth Argyle as a shipload of 18th-century pirates. Several of the characters in this strip were given the names of then-current players on the real Plymouth Argyle team.

Ian Holloway's first competitive game in charge was a 1–1 draw at home to Wolves, with striker Barry Hayles scoring a debut goal. A win at Sunderland soon followed, as the Green Army travelled the longest distance to an away game that season, and despite going 1–0 down after just 30 seconds, Nick Chadwick scored nine minutes from time to give the Pilgrims a 2–3 win. On 12 September, Cardiff City visited Home Park, and despite being 3–0 down after 49 minutes, Argyle came back to draw 3–3. Plymouth's strong start to the 2006–07 Championship campaign continued, and they were soon looking capable of qualifying for the play-off. The January transfer window saw considerable activity in the transfer market with the arrival of Hungarians Krisztián Timár and Péter Halmosi (initially on loan but both signed permanently in May 2007 as part of an option to buy arrangement), the signing of Rory Fallon from Swansea City, and Kevin Gallen and Scott Sinclair on loan from Queens Park Rangers and Chelsea respectively. But their form dipped in the second half of the season–after they finished February in 12th place, a wide gap opened up between them and the teams in the top six, making their promotion bid more difficult than it had appeared earlier in the season. Despite this disappointment, the team made significantly better progress than in recent seasons in the FA Cup, reaching the quarter-finals. They beat League Two Peterborough United at the second attempt in the third round, then a solo-goal from on-loan youngster Scott Sinclair (which was officially voted 'goal of the round') helped them to a 2–0 win at Barnet in the fourth round. They beat Championship league leaders Derby County 2–0 in the next, but in the quarter-finals, they were drawn at home to Premier League strugglers Watford and lost out to a Hameur Bouazza strike against the run of play. After a run of five consecutive wins, Argyle finished the 2006–07 in 11th place, their highest league finish for 20 years.

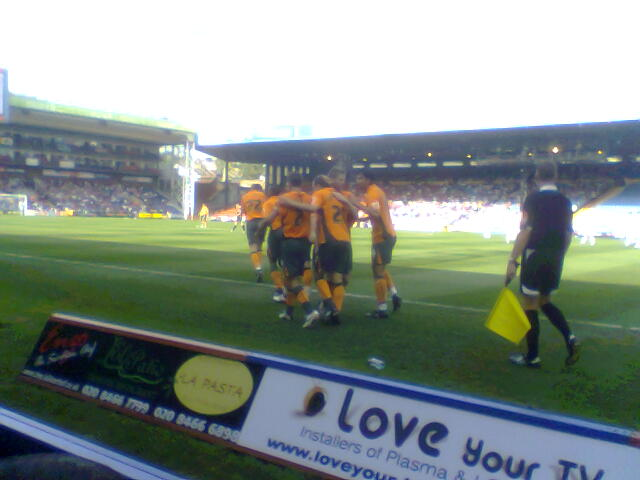
Plymouth's players celebrate a goal in the 1–2 win at Crystal Palace in 2008, which was scored by Paul Gallagher

Before the start of the 2007–08 season, manager Ian Holloway said that Plymouth were capable of earning promotion to the Premier League for the first time in their history, and they made a good start to the new season with a 2–3 win at Hull City (who actually went on to win the play-offs). The club's good start continued as they stayed near the play-off places for the first few months. However, on 21 November 2007 Ian Holloway controversially resigned to take charge of Leicester City.

== Sturrock returns ==
On 27 November 2007, Paul Sturrock resigned from Swindon Town to rejoin Plymouth Argyle. His first game back resulted in a 3–0 win against Scunthorpe United.

Sturrock arrived at a time where many key players were being approached by other clubs. Sturrock could do nothing to stop Sylvan Ebanks Blake, David Norris and youngster Dan Gosling leave for Wolves, Ipswich and Everton respectively. The January 2008 transfer window marked an important point in the recent history of the club.

On 9 February, the Green Army went to the Walkers Stadium to face Holloway's Leicester (the game was also live on Sky Sports). To add some more 'spice' to the game, Argyle chairman Paul Stapleton accused Holloway of luring some of the club's star players away, and both sets of fans wore Holloway T-shirts, with 'Holloway is a liar' and other slogans written on some of the Argyle fans' shirts. Anti-Holloway chants could be heard from the away end constantly, and a goal from Peter Halmosi on 34 minutes gave the Pilgrims a 0–1 win. Leicester were eventually relegated on the final day of the season, with Holloway being sacked.

That victory was followed with a good run of form for Argyle, including a 1–2 win away at local rivals Bristol City, with Rory Fallon scoring twice. But Argyle only won one of their final seven games, meaning that they missed out on the play-offs but finished 10th–continuing the club's unprecedented record of improving their league position every season since the turn of the millennium. In the FA Cup 2007-08, despite losing 2–1 at Fratton Park in the fourth round, Argyle had the honour of being the only team to score against Portsmouth, the eventual winners.

With many more of the team's key players leaving Home Park during the summer of 2008, the following season promised to be a challenging one for the club. The Pilgrims began the season with a string of poor results, but a 2–1 win at Watford in mid-September sparked a good run of form for Argyle as Sturrock's new side began to come together. The Scottish manager celebrated his 100th win in charge of the club (from two spells) with a 4–0 thrashing of former club Sheffield Wednesday at Home Park. It was starting to look as if Argyle would put in another challenge for the play-offs, but consistency proved to be a problem. A 0–0 draw at struggling Southampton started an awful run for Argyle, and they finished 2008 in 15th place–now 8 points adrift of the play-offs. On 3 January 2009, Argyle travelled to the recently built Emirates Stadium to play against Premiership giants Arsenal in the FA Cup third round. Arsenal scored two quick goals after the break, but Karl Duguid scored after 53 minutes to pull one back for the Greens. But Gunners striker Robin Van Persie scored his second of the game five minutes from time to give Arsenal a 3–1 win. Argyle's league form then plummeted throughout the early stages of the new year, and they had to wait nine league games into 2009 to get their first win of the year – and it was an extremely important one as well, as it was a 1–0 success at eventual league winners Wolves. On loan Blackburn Rovers midfielder Paul Gallagher scored the only goal after just 44 seconds with an overhead kick. That was followed by a 2–1 win at home to Watford, with Gallagher scoring twice. Although Argyle couldn't keep up their revival for long as a run of 3 consecutive defeats put them in serious danger of relegation. But a late goal from defender Gary Sawyer gave them a crucial 1–0 win at fellow struggler's Blackpool, and that was followed by a 4–0 win against Coventry City (all four goals came in the first half), which looked to have secured survival. Plymouth then picked up a 1–1 draw at Birmingham, who ended up getting promoted, but a 3–0 home loss against Doncaster put Argyle right back in danger of relegation. But after a 0–0 draw at QPR and Norwich's failure to beat Reading (two games before the end of the season), Argyle's survival was confirmed. The club finished 21st in the league table, five points and one place clear of the relegation places–Argyle's first season where they didn't improve their league position for eight years.

At a packed press conference on 2 July 2009, Sir Roy Gardner took over the chairman's role with Keith Todd CBE, Yasuaki Kagami and George Synan appointed as board directors.

Argyle scored just five minutes into the 2009–10 season, with Krisztian Timar heading home at Crystal Palace, but the match finished 1–1. A last minute own goal from Kaspars Gorkšs gave them another 1–1 draw at home to QPR in their next game. But Argyle then went on a run of seven consecutive losses, despite putting in some decent performances. However, their effort was rewarded on 29 September after a 2–1 win at newly promoted Peterborough United, and that was followed with another 2–1 success, this time against Scunthorpe United.

Former player Paul Mariner was appointed the club's head coach in late October, after assistant manager Kevin Summerfield left when told that his current contract would not be renewed. Mariner's first game on the sidelines was at home to one of his other former clubs, Ipswich Town, and resulted in a 1–1 draw. That was followed by a shock 0–1 win at promotion chasing Middlesbrough, in Gordon Strachan's first game as Boro manager, with Jamie Mackie scoring a 64th-minute goal, and a 2–1 home win over Doncaster Rovers with goals from on-loan midfielder Alan Judge and Rory Fallon, both getting their third goals of the season.

== Sturrock moves upstairs, Mariner takes charge ==
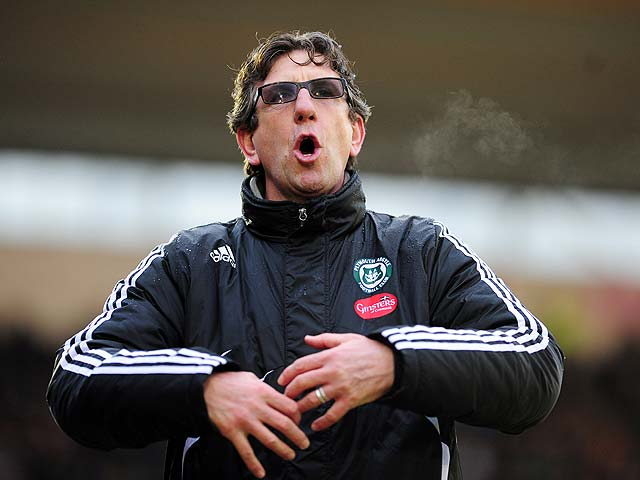
Mariner during his tenure as manager of Plymouth Argyle, pictured in 2010.

Paul Sturrock's second stint in charge came to an end on 10 December 2009, when a press conference confirmed he was relieved of his managerial duties due to two years of poor results and fan unrest and had taken up a 'business-support' role, working alongside Director and Chief Executive, Keith Todd. Head Coach Paul Mariner was placed in charge of team affairs. Sturrock's last game in charge was a 1–0 defeat at Swansea City on 8 December.

However, Mariner lost his first two games–his first fixture resulted in a 2–0 loss at Preston North End and then Argyle were defeated 1–0 at home to Coventry, leaving the Pilgrims bottom of the table and six points adrift of safety. On Boxing day, Argyle were away at local rivals Cardiff City, and it was the first meeting between the sides at the new Cardiff City Stadium. Cardiff were fourth in the table at the time while Argyle were bottom, but full-back Gary Sawyer scored an 84th-minute winner to give the visitors a shock 0–1 victory. Two days later, Argyle thrashed relegation rivals Reading 4–1 at Home Park to go two points adrift of safety. The Pilgim's first game of 2010 was at home to Championship league leaders Newcastle United in the third round of the FA Cup. The game ended 0–0, but Newcastle won 3–0 in the replay. Victor Moses found the back of the net as Crystal Palace won 0–1 at Home Park.

Striker Jamie Mackie scored an 82nd-minute winner to give Argyle a 1–0 victory at home to fellow strugglers Derby in mid-week. Days later, Argyle went 0–1 up away at Sheffield Wednesday, another side in relegation danger, but went on to lose 2–1. They then lost 0–1 against second place West Bromwich Albion, however new loan signing David Stockdale did save a late penalty to restore some pride for Argyle. But Stockdale, on loan from Fulham, was unable to save Shane Long's last-gasp spot kick at the Madejski Stadium, as the Pilgrims lost 2–1 at relegation rivals Reading. That result meant Argyle were eight points off safety.

However, The Pilgrims travelled to face Barnsley in their next game, which proved to be a memorable one for the Green Army. Hugo Colace gave Barnsley the lead just before half-time, but Argyle responded well in the second period, and on 64 minutes team captain Carl Fletcher equalised with a strike from just inside the box. Ten minutes later, Jamie Mackie fired the visitors in front, and with 83 minutes on the clock, Rory Fallon scored with a lob from 35 yards (32 m) out to give Argyle a 1–3 win at Oakwell. It was the first time Argyle came from behind to win a game since Boxing day 2007, when the Greens beat QPR 2–1 at Home Park. It was also the first time they won by two goals or more away from home since 19 February 2008, when Argyle won 0–2 at Southampton. Yala Bolasie–making his Argyle debut after a season on loan at Barnet, was given the man of the match award. January signing Damien Johnson scored his first Argyle goal just days later in a 1–1 draw at home to Swansea, however it proved to be controversial. With the hosts trailing through Darren Pratley's sublime 46th-minute goal, they were awarded a penalty five minutes from time. Jamie Mackie took it, but it was well saved by Dorus de Vries. The Devon linesman ordered the spot kick to be re-taken. Johnson took it this time, but yet again de Vries was equal to it, but Johnson converted the rebound. In their next game, Craig Noone's 39th-minute header cancelled out Kari Arnason's own goal seven minutes earlier as the Greens came from behind to get a result for the third consecutive game after drawing 1–1 with Leicester City.

But the Greens' good run failed to continue after an unlucky 4–3 defeat at Sheffield United (Argyle were 3–0 down before coming back to 3–2, but then went 4–2 down before the game finished 4–3), a 1–1 draw at home to Preston North End and a 2–0 loss at fellow strugglers Queens Park Rangers.

But on 17 March, Argyle picked up a crucial three points with a thrilling 3–2 win over local rivals Bristol City. The Greens were 2–0 up at half-time through Chris Clark (with his first ever league goal for the club) and Bradley Wright-Phillips (with his first-ever goal for the club), but two Nicky Maynard strikes made it 2–2. When it looked like Argyle were heading for another draw (or even a defeat), team captain Carl Fletcher struck in the first minute of injury time to give Argyle a sweet 3–2 win.

Yet again, Argyle's run was halted after a 2–1 defeat at fellow strugglers Scunthorpe United, but they then impressively won 0–2 away at Ipswich thanks to goals from Bradley Wright-Phillips and Joe Mason to move within three points of safety. However, despite a 1–2 win at high-flying Doncaster Rovers, defeats to Middlesbrough (0–2), Watford (1–0) and Newcastle United (0–2) sealed their relegation fate (whilst simultaneously allowing Newcastle to claim the Championship title) with two games to go. Argyle then went on to lose their remaining two games; away to Nottingham Forest and Peterborough United. Argyle ended the season as the second lowest-scoring team in the division, with only Swansea City scoring fewer, as well as winning the fewest games at home. The club's six-year stay in the second tier of the Football League was over.

== Peter Reid and Decline ==
On 24 June 2010, former England midfielder Peter Reid was appointed manager for the forthcoming season. Peter Reid's career at Argyle got off to a good start as his team beat title favourites Southampton at St Mary's Stadium on the opening day of the season. Argyle won the game 0–1 with Luke Summerfield scoring a 47th-minute winner. Throughout the late summer and Autumn a trend of strong away performances and poor home performances began to appear. The Pilgrims won 2–3 away to Swindon on 28 September, in a game where they led 0–2, before Swindon pulled it back to 2–2, then Bradley Wright-Phillips scored his second of the game to give Argyle a 2–3 injury time win. However, in the same week, they lost 0–1 at home to Hartlepool United, and that meant that Argyle had lost four of their first six matches at home.

Argyle's season was lacking consistency. This was summed up by Argyle's 3–1 home win against local rivals Bristol Rovers on 2 November 2010 followed by four straight defeats, one of which included a 1–2 injury time loss to bitter rivals Exeter City in the Football League Trophy area quarter-final. That was the first meeting between the sides in eight years, with Argyle winning the last fixture 3–0 at Home Park in February 2002. On 20 November, following a 1–2 home defeat to Brentford, newly relegated Argyle were 20th in League One, just one place and three points above the relegation zone.

On 23 November, Argyle came from 0–1 down to beat fellow strugglers Dagenham & Redbridge 2–1 at Home Park, lifting them up to 15th. However, just 4,960 were present at the game. That was Argyle's lowest league attendance since they were in the bottom tier. Not long after, the Pilgrims were presented with a winding-up order by HMRC and appeared in court on 8 December, only to earn a 63-day adjournment so they could pay the taxes they owed.

Three days later, after their financial incident, Argyle picked up a memorable victory – arguably their best performance of the season resulted in them beating fierce Devon rivals Exeter City 2–0 at Home Park, in a league fixture. A total of 14,347 attended the game – the biggest gate at Home Park in three years, and also a sell out. Both goals came from Bradley Wright-Phillips, who, as of 17 December 2010, was League One's top scorer with twelve goals.

On 24 December it was announced that Keith Todd MBE had stood down as executive director, to be replaced temporarily by Paul Stapleton. Todd will, however, remain on the board of directors. On 27 December 2010, it was announced by the BBC that Sir Roy Gardner had relinquished his role as chairman and stood down from the board.

On 4 January, Argyle propelled themselves up to 12th in League One – their highest position since August – after coming from 2 – 0 down at half-time to beat Westcountry rivals Bristol Rovers 2 – 3, thanks to goals from Bradley Wright-Phillips, Joe Mason and Stéphane Zubar. On 21 February, the club issued a notice of intention to appoint an administrator and were immediately docked 10 points by the Football League which dropped them to the bottom of the League One table after poor results continued. The club officially went into administration on 4 March. Brendan Guilfoyle of P&A Partnership was appointed to run the club and search for a buyer.

A 1–0 loss away to Exeter City at St. James Park on 30 April, with the only goal scored by James Dunne, left Argyle on the brink of a second successive relegation. Exeter's second win of the season against Argyle, combined with the days other results, meant that Argyle must win both their remaining games and rely on other teams results to avoid relegation. Relegation was confirmed two days later, following a 3–1 home defeat against Southampton on 2 May.

Plymouth had a poor start to the season, as a result Peter Reid was sacked on 18 September, whilst bottom of the League Two, with midfielder Carl Fletcher taking over as caretaker manager.

== James Brent Era ==
James Brent's Akkeron Group agreed to a deal with the Administrators to buy the club with Peter Ridsdale also confirming that he would leave the club when the deal had been completed. The Football League then banned any loan signings until the deal had been completed on 6 October. Further problems occurred with the Administrators threatening to quit the club. The PFA agreed a repayment plan for the employees to receive their wages as well as former manager Peter Reid agreeing to a deal. Argyle also agreed to a deal to sell Home Park back to Plymouth council on 14 October for £1.6m and they had to pay £135,000 a year for rent. On 28 October the deal with James Brent was approved and he would take his seat at the club when Home Park was sold. Plymouth officially exited administration on 31 October, after the takeover was complete. The team's form greatly improved after the takeover, and while the eventual League finish of 21st was the lowest in the club's history, they still secured survival with three games to spare, which was quite an achievement considering they had been well adrift at the bottom for the first half of the campaign.

In the following season, Argyle started looking to climb back up the Football League, but got off to a shaky start under Carl Fletcher, who continued to take charge of the squad after the Summer. The club found themselves bottom of the table again at the end of the Christmas period, and consequently, Fletcher was sacked on 1 January 2013 and replaced on 6 January by John Sheridan. In the second half of the season, the club was again narrowly saved from relegation, and they finished 21st for a consecutive season. Sheridan then agreed a three-year contract to continue as Argyle manager, and in his first full season in charge, the club finished 10th, an achievement which displayed great improvement on the previous two seasons. Argyle had a far stronger start to their fourth consecutive season in League 2, winning 4 games consecutively for the first time since 2008. Despite a poor run of results over Christmas and the New Year, including a 0–0 draw against a 10-man York City, Argyle looked set to clinch a League 2 play-off position thanks to a 3–2 home win against Tranmere Rovers, a result which, at the same time, relegated the away side out of the Football League for the first time in 94 years. Derek Adams was appointed in 2015 and by Christmas, Argyle were top of the league. But by February they had slipped down to 2nd and with a 2–2 Draw with Cambridge United F.C. made it impossible for Argyle to get automatic promotion. After a 2–2 draw with Portsmouth F.C. Argyle secured a place in the EFL League Two play-off final via a 91st-minute header from Peter Hartley. But after a poor performance in the final, Argyle were, surprising beaten 2–0 by AFC Wimbledon from 78th and 98th-minute goals. The 2016–17 season saw Argyle, for a consecutive season, at the top of the table at the midpoint of the season at Christmas. But argyle slipped down to second place after a poor run of form after Christmas. With 4 games to go, Argyle only needed 1 point to seal promotion. But a comprehensive 6–1 victory against Newport County on 17 April in front of a packed Home Park to make it impossible for Luton Town to catch them. They therefore were promoted to League One after six years in the fourth tier. On the last day of the season, Argyle had the chance to go up as champions. But after a 1–1 draw with Grimsby Town F.C. the title was handed to Portsmouth F.C. via goal difference. The pilgrims got off to an appalling start to their League one campaign with only racking up 5 points in their first 11 games and receiving 4 red cards in 4 consecutive home games, sitting rock bottom, 4 points off of safety even 11 games in. And a 2–1 defeat at home to Fleetwood added to Argyle's woes pushing their winless run to 10 games racking up 2 points from a possible 30 in that time. Some fans disputed about the board sacking Derek Adams even after taking them up in the previous season due to poor tactics and game management. The turn of December 2017, into 2018 saw argyle record 16 wins, 6 draws and only 5 losses to escape relegation and finish 7th, only missing out on a play-off spot by 3 points.

== Hallett takes over ==
As early as March 2016, Plymouth-born but American-based businessman Simon Hallett had invested into Argyle and hence joined the board of directors. Hallett later increased his stake in the club, as well as offering a long-term, minimum interest loan to the club to help refurbish the Mayflower Grandstand. In August 2018, Hallett became the majority shareholder of the club, with James Brent reducing his stake, as well as stepping down as chairman. Hallett had originally appointed David Felwick CBE as Argyle's chairman-elect, but he cited "personal reasons" for being unable to take over, so Hallett took over as chairman on 1 November 2018.

On the field, it took Argyle until their 12th league game to secure their first win of the 2018–19 season, a 1–0 victory over AFC Wimbledon. The form of top goalscorer Freddie Ladapo was the shining light in a disappointing first half of the season, with a stand-out low point of a 5–1 defeat away to Luton Town. The turn of the new year saw Argyle pick up form, winning 6 of their first 9 games of 2019, and losing just 2 of the first 12, culminating in a 5–1 win over Rochdale on 23 February. This run coincided with the return of Kyle Letheren in between the sticks in place of Matt Macey. An injury to Letheren and a stop–start March followed with Argyle winning late on against Shrewsbury Town at home, before giving away a 2–1 and then a 2–0 lead to Bristol Rovers and then Blackpool in the dying minutes to draw both matches. What was seemingly 6 points dropped to 2 proved costly as Argyle's league form dipped, losing every single game in April, and following a 5–1 defeat to Accrington Stanley which left the club in the EFL League One relegation zone with just one match of the season left to play, Derek Adams and his assistant Paul Wotton were relieved of their duties. Kevin Nancekivell took over as caretaker manager for the final game of the season, and despite winning 3–2 against Scunthorpe United, results elsewhere at games involving Southend United and AFC Wimbledon saw Argyle relegated to the EFL League Two.

Ahead of the 2019–20 season, Hallett appointed Ryan Lowe as Derek Adams' successor, signing the then 40-year-old Liverpudlian and his assistant manager Steven Schumacher from newly promoted but financially troubled Bury. Hallett also increased his stake in the club once more to 94% percent, taking over James Brent's remaining shares as both he and his daughter Natasha Brent stepped down from Argyle's board, ending Brent's 8-year spell at the club.

== See also ==
- Septimus Atterbury – who is best remembered for thirty years of service that he gave to the club as a player and then a coach.
