= 1996 Football League Third Division play-off final =

Plymouth Argyle	Darlington
1	0
- Date: 25 May 1996
- Venue: Wembley Stadium, London
- Man of the Match: Matty Appleby
- Referee: William Burns (North Yorkshire)
- Attendance: 43,431

The 1996 Football League Third Division play-off final was a football match played at Wembley Stadium on 25 May 1996, to determine the fourth and final team to gain promotion from the Third Division to the Second Division of the Football League in the 1995–96 season.

It was contested by Plymouth Argyle, who finished fourth in the Third Division table, and Darlington, who finished fifth. The teams reached the final by defeating Colchester United and Hereford United respectively in the two-legged semi-finals.

Plymouth Argyle won the match 1–0 thanks to a headed goal from Ronnie Mauge to gain promotion back to the third tier of English football one season after being relegated. For the club's manager, Neil Warnock, it was his fourth success in the play-offs as a manager, having achieved it twice with Notts County and once with Huddersfield Town. His counterpart, Jim Platt, would leave full-time management at the end of that year.

== Route to the final ==
Football League Third Division final table, leading positions
Pos	Team	P	W	D	L	F	A	Pts
1.	Preston North End	46	23	17	6	78	38	86
2.	Gillingham	46	22	17	7	49	20	83
3.	Bury	46	22	13	11	66	48	79
4.	Plymouth Argyle	46	22	12	12	68	49	78
5.	Darlington	46	20	18	8	60	42	78
6.	Hereford United	46	20	14	12	65	47	74
7.	Colchester United	46	18	18	10	61	51	72

Plymouth Argyle had finished the 1995–96 Football League season in fourth place in the Third Division, one place ahead of Darlington. Therefore, both missed out on the three automatic promotion places and instead took part in the play-offs to determine who would join Preston North End, Gillingham, and Bury as the fourth promoted team. On the final day of the league season, Plymouth Argyle had the opportunity to finish third in the table and thereby clinch the final automatic promotion place but a 3–0 win at Home Park against Hartlepool United was not enough to overtake Bury, after they also won 3–0 at home to Cardiff City.

In the play-off semi-finals, Darlington were paired with sixth-placed Hereford United and Plymouth Argyle with seventh-place finishers Colchester United. Darlington won their first leg tie 2–1 at Edgar Street courtesy of goals from Robbie Blake and Sean Gregan. They also won the second leg by the same scoreline at Feethams with Matty Appleby and Robbie Painter on the scoresheet.

Plymouth Argyle lost the first leg of their semi-final tie 1–0 at Layer Road after a goal from Mark Kinsella, but they responded in the second leg at Home Park. Goals from Mickey Evans, Chris Leadbitter and Paul Williams were enough to secure a 3–1 win and a 3–2 victory on aggregate. The results set up a first visit to Wembley Stadium for the supporters of both clubs.

Plymouth Argyle				Darlington
Opponent	Result	Legs	Round	Opponent	Result	Legs
Colchester United	3–2	0–1 away; 3–1 home	Semi-finals	Hereford United	4–2	2–1 away; 2–1 home

== Pre-match ==
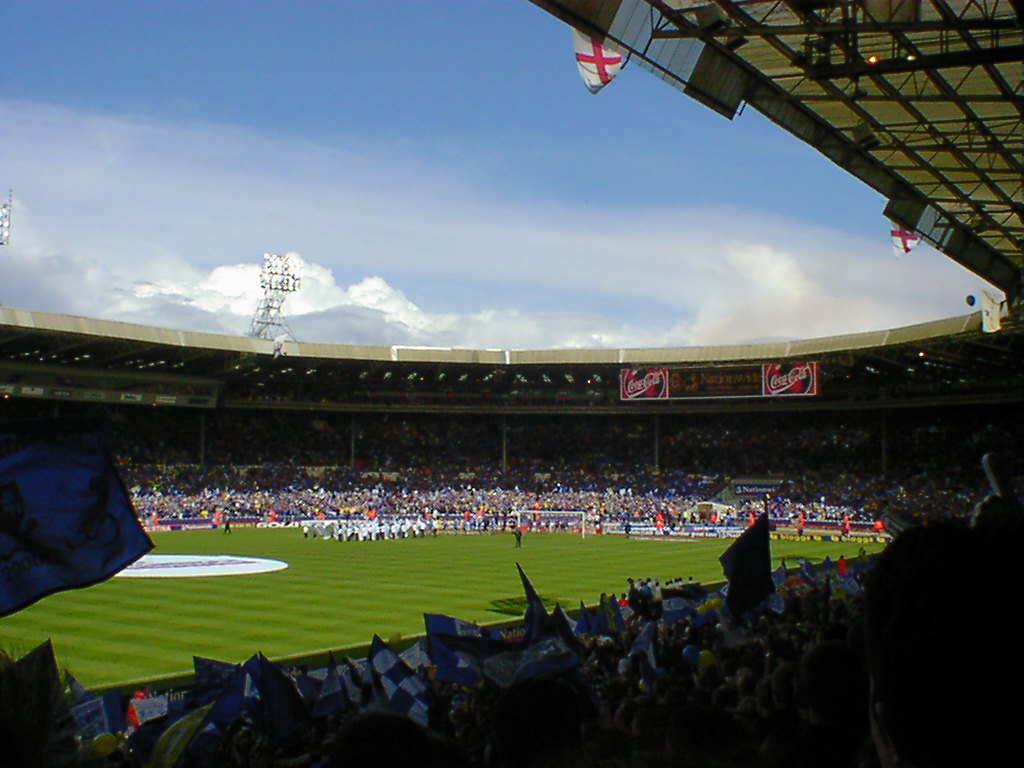
The first play-off final of the 1995–96 season was bathed in sunshine.

The two teams were competing for promotion to the third tier of the English football league system, at the time called the Second Division, a familiar place for both teams. In its previous 68 seasons as a Football League club, Plymouth Argyle competed exclusively in the second and third tiers, exactly 34 seasons each. While Darlington had featured in the second tier just twice, competing in the third tier on 32 occasions and the fourth tier another 32 times. The official attendance of 43,431 was a record for a play-off final at that level, beating the previous record set in 1994, until it was bettered a year later by 3,373 spectators. There was also a significant disparity in the number of tickets sold to the supporters of the two clubs, with fewer than 10,000 Darlington fans in attendance compared to 35,000 fans representing Plymouth Argyle.

Plymouth Argyle manager Neil Warnock picked ten players who had started both of the club's semi-final matches, with Ronnie Mauge keeping his place in the team having replaced Chris Billy for the second leg. The match was to be goalkeeper Steve Cherry's last for the club, having returned for a second stint with the club three months earlier. Darlington manager Jim Platt, who was taking charge of the team for the last time before the return of David Hodgson, made one change to the team that secured progress from the semi-final stage with Tony Carss coming in at the expense of Matt Carmichael. The final would prove to be man of the match Matty Appleby's last for Darlington.

== Match ==
=== Summary ===
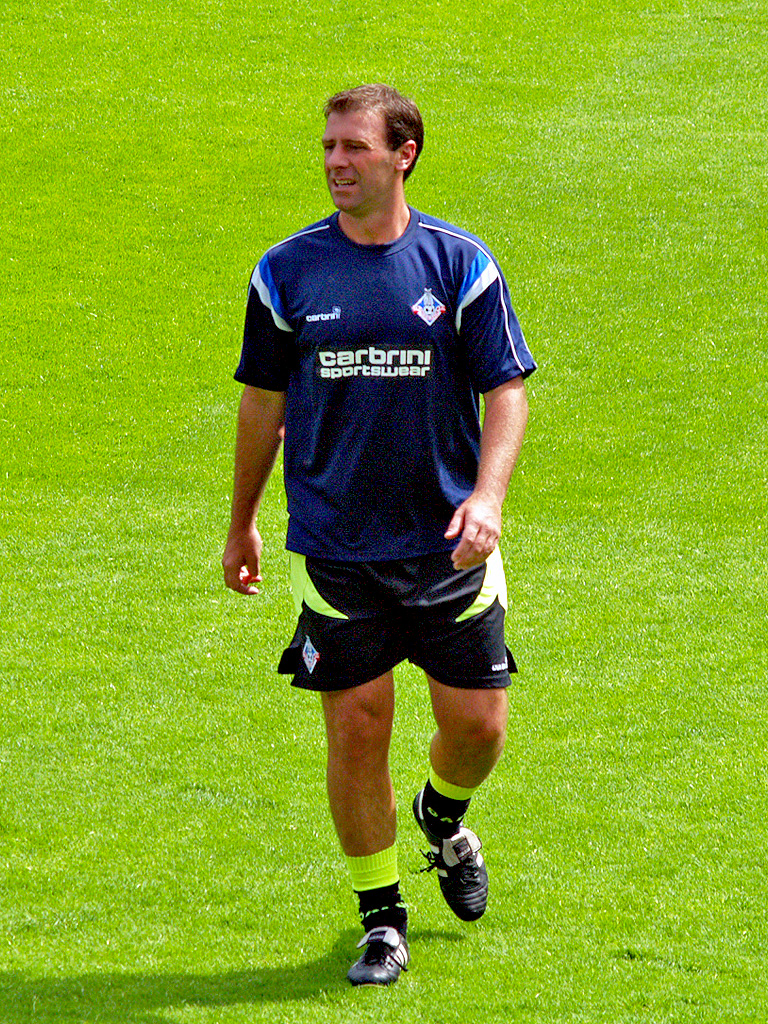
Sean Gregan was a key player for Darlington.

Darlington were the first to settle with Gary Bannister a prominent player in midfield, but Plymouth Argyle eventually found their rhythm and had the first real goalscoring opportunity after ten minutes. Adrian Littlejohn found space after a one-two with Mickey Evans, but his first touch let him down and the opportunity was not taken. Darlington's main threat was coming from attacking full back Appleby and he had their best chance of the match midway through the first half. He carved out the initial chance, having carried the ball half the length of the pitch, but team-mate Steven Gaughan was unable to convert. The hasty clearance from Argyle found its way back to Appleby but he sent his shot over the crossbar with goalkeeper Cherry completely exposed.

Plymouth Argyle came close to making their opponents pay for their profligacy in front of goal with Evans lifting a volley over the crossbar. Darlington's captain Andy Crosby was proving to be a formidable figure at the heart of his team's defence, but Argyle fashioned another chance to open the scoring just before half-time. A flick on by Evans presented Adrian Littlejohn with the opportunity to redeem his earlier miss, but he dragged his shot wide.

There were few clear-cut chances at the start of the second half, but Plymouth Argyle were winning the midfield battle with Mauge and Chris Leadbitter leading by example with a number of forceful tackles. The pivotal moment arrived on 65 minutes after Martin Barlow had earned a corner-kick on the right-hand side. Leadbitter played the ball short to full back Mark Patterson, whose well-measured cross was met firmly by the unmarked Mauge to head into the back of the net. Darlington tried to force their way back into the match, but were being thwarted by Plymouth Argyle captain Mick Heathcote and his defensive colleagues which left strikers Robbie Blake and Robbie Painter, who both scored in the semi-finals, with little to work on. As Darlington committed more players forward in search of an equaliser they left themselves exposed in defence which gave the leading side more space to launch counter-attacks. Evans and Littlejohn threatened to score the decisive second goal, but in the end Mauge's headed finish midway through the second half proved to be enough to claim the final promotion place for the team from Devon. The match was by no means a classic, with serious goalscoring chances at a premium, but to the winners it did not matter.

=== Details ===
25 May 1996
15:00 BST

Plymouth Argyle	1–0	Darlington
Mauge 65'	Report

Wembley Stadium, London
Attendance: 43,431
Referee: William Burns (North Yorkshire)

Plymouth Argyle	Darlington

GK	1	Steve Cherry
WB	2	Mark Patterson
CB	4	Chris Curran
CB	5	Mick Heathcote (c)
CB	6	Richard Logan
WB	3	Paul Williams
CM	7	Martin Barlow
CM	8	Ronnie Mauge	Booked
CM	11	Chris Leadbitter
CF	9	Adrian Littlejohn
CF	10	Mickey Evans
Substitutes:
MF	13	Chris Billy
FW	14	Ian Baird
FW	15	Carlo Corazzin
Manager:
Neil Warnock

GK	1	Paul Newell
WB	2	Matty Appleby	Booked
CB	4	Andy Crosby (c)
CB	5	Sean Gregan
CB	6	Phil Brumwell
WB	3	Mark Barnard
CM	7	Steven Gaughan		(substituted off) 85'
CM	8	Gary Bannister
CM	11	Tony Carss
FW	9	Robbie Painter
FW	10	Robbie Blake
Substitutes:
DF	13	Paul Mattison
MF	14	Gary Twynham
FW	15	Matt Carmichael		(substituted on) 85'
Manager:
Jim Platt

Match rules:

- 90 minutes.
- 30 minutes of extra time if necessary.
- Penalty shoot-out if scores still level.
- Three named substitutes.
- Maximum of three substitutions.

== Post-match ==
After the final whistle Plymouth Argyle's captain Mick Heathcote received the winners' trophy before parading it in front of the club's supporters on the pitch. For the club's manager, Neil Warnock, it was his fourth play-off success at Wembley Stadium. He commented on his past experiences that "It can't be a hindrance, having done it before, but it doesn't make it any less tense. It makes it a very long season. I had booked a holiday starting today – I suppose I should have known better".

Warnock was also full of praise for his counterpart, Jim Platt, commenting that "He should be made manager of the year for what he's done at that club". Citing Darlington's financial worries "Everyone thought they would blow up, but they didn't – they got within an ace. Unfortunately, someone has to lose". Platt, a former Northern Ireland international, was equally optimistic. He said "My side is very young – nearly all of them in their early 20s. I think we will be here again next season or go up automatically – if we can keep the side together".

As a result of their victory, Plymouth Argyle returned to the third tier of English football just one year after being relegated to the fourth tier for the first time in its history. They returned to the Third Division two years later before being promoted as champions in 2002, and the club followed that up by winning the Second Division in 2004, to reclaim their place in the second tier of English football after a twelve-year hiatus. For Darlington, there was to be more disappointment in the play-offs four years later under David Hodgson, Platt's successor. They reached the Third Division final in 2000, the last to be played at the original Wembley Stadium, and were defeated 1–0 again; on this occasion to Peterborough United.

== See also ==
- 1996 Football League First Division play-off final
- 1996 Football League Second Division play-off final
