= 1999–2000 Plymouth Argyle F.C. season =

English football club season

Plymouth Argyle
1999–00 season
- Chairman: Dan McCauley
- Manager: Kevin Hodges
- Stadium: Home Park
- Third Division: 12th
- FA Cup: Fourth round
- Football League Cup: First round
- Football League Trophy: Second round
- Top goalscorer: League: Paul McGregor (13); All: Paul McGregor (16)
- Highest home attendance: 14,893 (vs Torquay, 26 December)
- Lowest home attendance: 1,834 (vs Walsall, 24 August)
- Average home league attendance: 5,371
Home colours

The 1999–00 season was the 105th season in the history of Plymouth Argyle Football Club, their 75th in the Football League.

== Players ==
=== First-team squad ===
Squad at end of season

Note: Flags indicate national team as defined under FIFA eligibility rules; some limited exceptions apply. Players may hold more than one non-FIFA nationality.

| No. | Pos. | Nation | Player |
|---|---|---|---|
| 1 | GK | (England) ENG | Jon Sheffield |
| 2 | DF | (England) ENG | Jon Ashton |
| 3 | DF | (England) ENG | Jon Beswetherick |
| 4 | DF | (England) ENG | Chris Leadbitter |
| 5 | DF | (England) ENG | Mick Heathcote (captain) |
| 6 | DF | (Wales) WAL | Jason Rowbotham |
| 7 | MF | (England) ENG | Martin Barlow |
| 8 | MF | (England) ENG | Darren Bastow |
| 9 | FW | (Wales) WAL | Sean McCarthy |
| 10 | FW | (England) ENG | Paul McGregor |
| 11 | MF | (England) ENG | Chris Hargreaves |
| 12 | MF | (England) ENG | Lee Phillips |
| 13 | MF | (England) ENG | Steve McCall |
| 14 | DF | (England) ENG | Paul Gibbs |
| 15 | DF | (England) ENG | Paul Wotton |

| No. | Pos. | Nation | Player |
|---|---|---|---|
| 16 | DF | (Scotland) SCO | Scott Paterson |
| 18 | DF | (England) ENG | Adam Barrett |
| 19 | MF | (England) ENG | Kevin Wills |
| 20 | MF | (England) ENG | Steve Adams |
| 21 | FW | (England) ENG | Jamie Morrison-Hill |
| 22 | FW | (England) ENG | Barrington Belgrave |
| 23 | FW | (England) ENG | Ian Stonebridge |
| 24 | DF | (Republic of Ireland) IRL | Wayne O'Sullivan (Note: O'Sullivan was born in Akrotiri, Cyprus, but also qualified to represent the Republic of Ireland internationally and represented the Republic of Ireland at U-21 level.) |
| 25 | GK | (England) ENG | Ken Veysey |
| 26 | DF | (England) ENG | Craig Taylor |
| 27 | FW | (Scotland) SCO | Martin Gritton |
| 28 | FW | (England) ENG | Steve Guinan |
| 29 | GK | (England) ENG | Luke McCormick |
| 30 | MF | (England) ENG | Craig Etherington (on loan from West Ham United) |

=== Left club during season ===
Note: Flags indicate national team as defined under FIFA eligibility rules; some limited exceptions apply. Players may hold more than one non-FIFA nationality.

| No. | Pos. | Nation | Player |
|---|---|---|---|
| 16 | MF | (England) ENG | Brendan McGovern (released) |
| 16 | MF | (England) ENG | Craig Middleton (on loan from Cardiff City) |

| No. | Pos. | Nation | Player |
|---|---|---|---|
| 28 | MF | (England) ENG | Fergus Nevin (released) |
| 28 | FW | (England) ENG | Leon Hapgood (to Yeovil Town) |

== Third Division ==
=== League table ===
| Pos | Team | Pld | W | D | L | GF | GA | GD | Pts |
|---|---|---|---|---|---|---|---|---|---|
| 10 | Rochdale | 46 | 18 | 14 | 14 | 57 | 54 | +3 | 68 |
| 11 | Brighton & Hove Albion | 46 | 17 | 16 | 13 | 64 | 46 | +18 | 67 |
| 12 | Plymouth Argyle | 46 | 16 | 18 | 12 | 55 | 51 | +4 | 66 |
| 13 | Macclesfield Town | 46 | 18 | 11 | 17 | 66 | 61 | +5 | 65 |
| 14 | Hull City | 46 | 15 | 14 | 17 | 43 | 43 | 0 | 59 |

Rules for classification: 1) Points; 2) Goal difference; 3) Goals scored

=== Results by round ===
| Round | 1 | 2 | 3 | 4 | 5 | 6 | 7 | 8 | 9 | 10 | 11 | 12 | 13 | 14 | 15 | 16 | 17 | 18 | 19 | 20 | 21 | 22 | 23 | 24 | 25 | 26 | 27 | 28 | 29 | 30 | 31 | 32 | 33 | 34 | 35 | 36 | 37 | 38 | 39 | 40 | 41 | 42 | 43 | 44 | 45 | 46 |
|---|---|---|---|---|---|---|---|---|---|---|---|---|---|---|---|---|---|---|---|---|---|---|---|---|---|---|---|---|---|---|---|---|---|---|---|---|---|---|---|---|---|---|---|---|---|---|
| Ground | A | H | A | H | A | H | H | A | A | H | H | A | A | H | H | A | H | A | A | H | A | H | A | H | A | H | A | H | A | H | H | H | A | H | A | H | H | A | A | H | A | H | H | H | H | A |
| Result | L | D | W | W | L | D | D | L | L | W | W | D | W | D | W | W | W | L | D | W | D | D | L | W | D | D | L | W | D | W | L | D | D | D | D | D | W | L | W | W | L | W | D | L | L | D |
| Position | 13 | 17 | 12 | 10 | 13 | 14 | 15 | 17 | 20 | 13 | 12 | 15 | 12 | 13 | 9 | 8 | 6 | 8 | 7 | 7 | 7 | 9 | 11 | 8 | 12 | 12 | 13 | 10 | 12 | 11 | 11 | 11 | 10 | 8 | 10 | 10 | 8 | 10 | 9 | 9 | 9 | 9 | 9 | 9 | 11 | 12 |

Source: Statto.com
A = Away; H = Home; W = Win; D = Draw; L = Loss

=== Matches ===
| Win | Draw | Loss |

Plymouth Argyle's score comes first

| Date | H/A | Opposition | Attendance | Score | Scorers |
|---|---|---|---|---|---|
| 7 Aug | Away | Southend United | 4,981 | 1–2 | Barrett |
| 14 Aug | Home | Shrewsbury Town | 4,919 | 0–0 | |
| 21 Aug | Away | Halifax Town | 2,431 | 1–0 | Stonebridge |
| 28 Aug | Home | Peterborough United | 4,189 | 2–1 | Stonebridge, O'Sullivan |
| 30 Aug | Away | Carlisle United | 2,863 | 2–4 | Stonebridge (2) |
| 5 Sep | Home | Brighton and Hove Albion | 5,444 | 3–3 | Gritton (2), Stonebridge |
| 11 Sep | Home | Rotherham United | 4,075 | 1–1 | Heathcote |
| 18 Sep | Away | Hartlepool United | 2,242 | 0–3 | |
| 25 Sep | Away | Darlington | 5,045 | 0–2 | |
| 2 Oct | Home | Leyton Orient | 3,782 | 5–0 | Leadbitter (2), McCarthy (2), Hargreaves |
| 9 Oct | Home | Mansfield Town | 3,809 | 2–1 | Gritton, O'Sullivan |
| 16 Oct | Away | Rochdale | 3,105 | 0–0 | |
| 19 Oct | Away | Hull City | 4,727 | 1–0 | McGregor |
| 23 Oct | Home | Darlington | 4,362 | 0–0 | |
| 2 Nov | Home | Exeter City | 9,412 | 1–0 | McCarthy |
| 6 Nov | Away | Chester City | 2,027 | 1–0 | McCall |
| 14 Nov | Home | Barnet | 6,343 | 4–1 | McGregor (3), Stonebridge |
| 23 Nov | Away | Cheltenham Town | 5,140 | 0–2 | |
| 27 Nov | Away | York City | 2,745 | 0–0 | |
| 4 Dec | Home | Southend United | 4,679 | 3–1 | Bastow, Stonebridge, Hargreaves |
| 17 Dec | Away | Northampton Town | 5,039 | 1–1 | McGregor |
| 26 Dec | Home | Torquay United | 14,893 | 2–2 | McCarthy, McGregor |
| 28 Dec | Away | Swansea City | 9,075 | 0–1 | |
| 3 Jan | Home | Macclesfield Town | 6,128 | 3–2 | Stonebridge (2), Taylor |
| 15 Jan | Away | Shrewsbury Town | 2,458 | 0–0 | |
| 22 Jan | Home | Halifax Town | 4,841 | 1–1 | McGregor |
| 29 Jan | Away | Peterborough United | 5,694 | 0–2 | |
| 5 Feb | Home | Carlisle United | 4,009 | 2–0 | Middleton, Gritton |
| 12 Feb | Away | Brighton and Hove Albion | 5,654 | 1–1 | Gritton |
| 19 Feb | Home | York City | 4,343 | 2–0 | Middleton, McCarthy |
| 22 Feb | Away | Lincoln City | 2,561 | 0–3 | |
| 26 Feb | Home | Hartlepool United | 3,917 | 1–1 | McGregor |
| 4 Mar | Away | Rotherham United | 4,496 | 1–1 | Hargreaves |
| 7 Mar | Home | Chester City | 4,140 | 0–0 | |
| 11 Mar | Away | Exeter City | 4,287 | 1–1 | Taylor |
| 14 Mar | Home | Lincoln City | 4,111 | 1–1 | Barrett |
| 18 Mar | Home | Cheltenham Town | 4,392 | 1–0 | Gritton |
| 21 Mar | Away | Barnet | 2,328 | 0–1 | |
| 25 Mar | Away | Torquay United | 4,113 | 4–0 | Taylor, McGregor (3) |
| 1 Apr | Home | Northampton Town | 5,448 | 2–1 | McGregor, Rowbotham |
| 8 Apr | Away | Macclesfield Town | 2,231 | 1–4 | McCarthy |
| 15 Apr | Home | Swansea City | 5,881 | 1–0 | Barrett |
| 22 Apr | Home | Rochdale | 6,205 | 1–1 | McGregor |
| 24 Apr | Away | Leyton Orient | 4,113 | 0–3 | |
| 29 Apr | Home | Hull City | 4,233 | 0–1 | |
| 6 May | Away | Mansfield Town | 2,031 | 2–2 | Guinan (2) |

== Auto Windscreens Football League Trophy ==
=== Matches ===
| 11 January 2000 Round Two Southern Section | Plymouth Argyle | 0–1 | Torquay United | Home Park, Plymouth |
| 19:45 | | | | Attendance: 3,124 |

== Worthington Football League Cup ==
=== Matches ===
| 10 August 1999 Round One 1st Leg | Walsall | 4–1 | Plymouth Argyle | Bescot Stadium, Walsall |
| 19:45 | | | Stonebridge | Attendance: 3,502 |

| 24 August 1999 Round One 2nd Leg | Plymouth Argyle | 1–4 | Walsall | Home Park, Plymouth |
| 19:45 | Gritton | | | Attendance: 1,834 |

== FA Cup ==
=== Matches ===
| 30 October 1999 Round One | Brentford | 2–2 | Plymouth Argyle | Griffin Park, London |
| 15:00 | | | Stonebridge; McGregor | Attendance: 4,287 |

| 9 November 1999 Round One Replay | Plymouth Argyle | 2–1 | Brentford | Home Park, Plymouth |
| 19:45 | McGregor | | | Attendance: 5,409 |

| 20 November 1999 Round Two | Plymouth Argyle | 0–0 | Brighton | Home Park, Plymouth |
| 15:00 | | | | Attendance: 7,414 |

| 30 November 1999 Round Two Replay | Brighton | 1–2 | Plymouth Argyle | Home Park, Plymouth |
| 19:45 | | | Bastow; Hargreaves | Attendance: 7,414 |

| 11 December 1999 Round Three | Reading | 1–1 | Plymouth Argyle | Madejski Stadium, Reading, Berkshire |
| 15:00 | Hargreaves | | | Attendance: 8,536 |

| 21 December 1999 Round Three Replay | Plymouth Argyle | 1–0 | Reading | Home Park, Plymouth |
| 19:45 | Heathcote | | | Attendance: 8,965 |

| 8 January 2000 Round Four | Plymouth Argyle | 0–3 | Preston | Home Park, Plymouth |
| 15:00 | | | | Attendance: 10,824 |

== Statistics ==
=== Appearances and goals ===
| No | Nat | Pos | Name | Appearances | Sub appearances | Goals |
|---|---|---|---|---|---|---|
| 1 | (England) | GK | Jon Sheffield | 48 | 0 | 0 |
| 2 | (England) | DF | Jon Ashton | 8 | 3 | 0 |
| 3 | (England) | DF | Jon Beswetherick | 53 | 1 | 0 |
| 4 | (England) | MF | Chris Leadbitter | 36 | 3 | 2 |
| 5 | (England) | DF | Mick Heathcote | 35 | 2 | 2 |
| 6 | (Wales) | DF | Jason Rowbotham | 9 | 4 | 1 |
| 7 | (England) | MF | Martin Barlow | 1 | 1 | 0 |
| 8 | (England) | MF | Darren Bastow | 12 | 8 | 2 |
| 9 | (Wales) | ST | Sean McCarthy | 24 | 9 | 6 |
| 10 | (England) | ST | Paul McGregor | 53 | 0 | 16 |
| 11 | (England) | CM | Chris Hargreaves | 54 | 5 | 0 |
| 12 | (England) | MF | Lee Phillips | 4 | 15 | 0 |
| 13 | (England) | MF | Steve McCall | 5 | 10 | 1 |
| 14 | (England) | DF | Paul Gibbs | 3 | 4 | 0 |
| 15 | (England) | DF | Paul Wotton | 23 | 2 | 0 |
| 16 | (Scotland) | DF | Scott Paterson | 5 | 0 | 0 |
| 18 | (England) | DF | Adam Barrett | 47 | 5 | 3 |
| 19 | (England) | MF | Kevin Wills | 0 | 2 | 0 |
| 20 | (England) | MF | Steve Adams | 1 | 0 | 0 |
| 21 | (England) | MF | Jamie Morrison-Hill | 1 | 1 | 0 |
| 22 | (England) | ST | Barrington Belgrave | 2 | 16 | 0 |
| 23 | (England) | ST | Ian Stonebridge | 36 | 5 | 11 |
| 24 | (Republic of Ireland) (Cyprus) | DF | Wayne O'Sullivan | 55 | 0 | 2 |
| 25 | (England) | GK | Ken Veysey | 8 | 1 | 0 |
| 26 | (England) | DF | Craig Taylor | 46 | 0 | 3 |
| 27 | (England) | ST | Martin Gritton | 16 | 19 | 7 |
| 28 | (Scotland) | ST | Steve Guinan | 8 | 0 | 2 |
| 29 | (England) | GK | Luke McCormick | 0 | 0 | 0 |
| 30 | (England) | MF | Craig Etherington | 4 | 1 | 0 |

Last updated: 15 February 2015
Source:Greens on Screen
Source:Football Squads.co.uk
