= Bastow =

Bastow is a surname. Notable people with the surname include:

- Darren Bastow (born 1981), English footballer
- Ian Bastow (born 1971), English footballer
- James Austin Bastow
- John Bastow (1850–1927), English cricketer
- Tommy Bastow (born 1991), English actor and musician
