= 1886 in the United Kingdom =

Events from the year 1886 in the United Kingdom.

== Incumbents ==
- Monarch – Victoria
- Prime Minister – Robert Gascoyne-Cecil, 3rd Marquess of Salisbury (Conservative) (until 28 January); William Ewart Gladstone (Liberal) (starting 1 February, until 20 July); Robert Gascoyne-Cecil, 3rd Marquess of Salisbury (Conservative) (starting 25 July)

== Events ==
- January – Ulster Protestant Unionists begin to lobby against the Irish Home Rule Bill, establishing the Ulster Loyal Anti-Repeal Union in Belfast.
- 13 January – after six years of campaigning, the atheist Charles Bradlaugh is permitted to affirm rather than take the traditional oath, allowing him to take his seat as a Member of Parliament.
- 18 January – the Hockey Association is founded, largely on the initiative of sports clubs in the London area, and codifies the rules for hockey.
- 27 January – Salisbury loses supports of the Irish Party, and resigns as Prime Minister.
- 1 February
  - William Ewart Gladstone becomes Prime Minister for the third time. He appoints as Under-Secretary of State for the Home Department Henry Broadhurst, the first person from a working-class labour movement background to be appointed a government minister in the U.K.
  - Mersey Railway opens, linking Birkenhead and Liverpool by tunnel.
- 8 February ("Black Monday") – "Pall Mall riots": climax of two days of rioting in the West End of London by the unemployed, coinciding with the coldest winter in thirty years.
- March
  - Gladstone announces his support for Irish Home Rule.
  - Linfield F.C. is formed in Belfast.
- 10 March – first Crufts dog show held in London.
- 16 March – it is announced in the House of Commons to acclamation that John Constable's painting The Hay Wain (1821) has been presented to the National Gallery in London by collector Henry Vaughan and hung there today.
- 8 April – Gladstone introduces the Government of Ireland Bill (the first Irish Home Rule Bill) in the House of Commons. During the debates on the Bill
  - Financial Secretary to the Treasury H.H. Fowler states his support for the Bill which in his words would bring about a "real Union – not an act of Parliament Union – but a moral Union, a Union of heart and soul between two Sister Nations".
  - Lord Randolph Churchill voices his opposition with the slogan "Ulster will fight, Ulster will be right".
- 12 April – the New English Art Club opens its first exhibition, at the Egyptian Hall, London, to the public, providing an alternative to the Royal Academy for younger artists, such as Philip Wilson Steer, under the influence of Paris.
- 11 May – the International Exhibition of Navigation, Commerce and Industry in Liverpool is opened by Queen Victoria.
- 8 June – the Irish Home Rule Bill fails to pass in Parliament on a vote of 343–313. Ulster Protestants celebrate its defeat, leading to renewed rioting on the streets of Belfast and the deaths of seven people, with many more injured.
- 12 June – Gladstone calls for a dissolution of Parliament.
- 25 June
  - Crofters' Holdings (Scotland) Act grants security of tenure to crofters.
  - Riot (Damages) Act provides for property owners to recover compensation from local police forces in the event of damage due to riot.
- 30 June – Royal Holloway College for women, established by Thomas Holloway (died 1883), opened by Queen Victoria at Egham in Surrey.
- 12 July–mid-September – Belfast riots: Beginning with the Orange Institution parades and continuing sporadically throughout the summer, clashes take place between Catholics and Protestants, and also between Loyalists and police. Thirteen people are killed in a weekend of serious rioting, with an official death toll of 31 people over the period.
- 23 July – the inaugural Eclipse Stakes, run at Sandown Park in Surrey with a prize fund of £10,000 donated by Leopold de Rothschild, making it at this time the richest British horse race, is won by the stallion Bendigo.
- 27 July – general election won by the Conservative Party under Salisbury but with a Parliamentary majority depending on the support of the new Liberal Unionist Party.
- 1 September – the Severn Tunnel is opened by the Great Western Railway.
- October – Edinburgh School of Medicine for Women founded by Dr Sophia Jex-Blake.
- 11 October – memorial statue to Sister Dora unveiled in Walsall.
- 9 December
  - Southport and St Anne's lifeboats disaster.
  - Beatification of Edmund Campion (executed 1581) by Pope Leo XIII.
- 22 December – Lord Randolph Churchill, Chancellor of the Exchequer since 3 August, resigns his office in protest against refusal of the Cabinet to accept cuts which he proposes in military budgets. He does not expect the Prime Minister to accept his resignation, but Salisbury does, and Churchill never holds ministerial office again.
- 25 December – great snow storm in London.

=== Undated ===
- The following Association football clubs are founded:
  - Arsenal, as Dial Square by workers at the Royal Arsenal in Woolwich, south-east London. They play their first match on the Isle of Dogs on 11 December. The club is renamed Royal Arsenal soon afterwards, supposedly on 25 December.
  - Argyle, in Plymouth; they play their first match on 16 October.
  - Motherwell, in Scotland on 17 May.
- Ormonde wins the English Triple Crown by finishing first in the Epsom Derby, 2,000 Guineas and St Leger.
- Scotch whisky distiller William Grant & Sons is founded.
- Establishment of the Yorkshire Tea merchants.
- The Maidenhead Citadel Band of The Salvation Army is founded by William Thomas.

== Publications ==
- Frances Hodgson Burnett's first children's novel Little Lord Fauntleroy (complete in book form).
- Marie Corelli's first novel A Romance of Two Worlds.
- Thomas Hardy's novel The Mayor of Casterbridge.
- Henry James' novel The Bostonians.
- Robert Louis Stevenson's novels Kidnapped and Strange Case of Dr Jekyll and Mr Hyde.

== Births ==
- 1 January – Ethel Carnie Holdsworth, working class novelist and campaigner (died 1962)
- 5 March
  - Paul Radmilovic, Welsh-born competitive swimmer, 4-times Olympic gold medal winner (died 1968)
  - Freddie Welsh, né Thomas, Welsh-born World lightweight boxing champion (died 1927 in the United States)
- 10 May – Olaf Stapledon, author and philosopher (died 1950)
- 20 May – John Jacob Astor, 1st Baron Astor of Hever, businessman (died 1971)
- 18 June – George Mallory, climber (died 1924)
- 21 June – William Ibbett, submariner and radio broadcaster (died 1975)
- 24 June – George Shiels, dramatist (died 1949)
- 19 July – Edward Sloman, silent film director, actor, screenwriter and radio broadcaster (died 1972)
- 26 August – Ronald Niel Stuart, Royal Navy captain (died 1954)
- 27 August
  - Rebecca Clarke, composer and violist (died 1979).
  - Eric Coates, composer (died 1957)
- 4 September – Albert Orsborn, 6th General of The Salvation Army (died 1967)
- 13 September – Robert Robinson, organic chemist, Nobel Prize laureate (died 1975)
- 18 September – C. H. Middleton, gardening broadcaster (died 1945)
- 20 September – Charles Williams, poet, novelist, playwright, theologian and literary critic (died 1945)
- 26 September – Archibald Vivian Hill, physiologist, Nobel Prize laureate (died 1977)
- 25 October – Leo G. Carroll, actor (died 1972)
- 12 November – Ben Travers, farceur (died 1980)
- 5 December – Constance Spry, florist (died 1960)

== Deaths ==
- 7 January – Richard Dadd, painter (born 1817)
- 12 February – Randolph Caldecott, artist (born 1846)
- 15 February – Edward Cardwell, 1st Viscount Cardwell, politician (born 1813)
- 27 March – Sir Henry Taylor, dramatist, poet and civil servant (born 1800)
- 5 April – William Edward Forster, Liberal politician (born 1818)
- 16 April – Andrew Nicholl, painter (born 1804)
- 17 May – Erskine May, constitutional theorist (born 1815)
- 19 June – Sir Charles Trevelyan, civil servant and colonial administrator (born 1807)
- 21 June – Daniel Dunglas Home, Scottish medium (born 1833)
- 17 July – David Stevenson, Scottish lighthouse designer (born 1815)
- 9 August – Samuel Ferguson, poet and artist (born 1810)
- 26 August – Robert Eden, bishop in the Scottish Episcopal Church (born 1804)
- 10 September – John Liptrot Hatton, composer, conductor, pianist and singer (born 1809)
- 18 September – Sampson Gamgee, surgeon (born 1828)
- 1 October – William Hepworth Thompson, classical scholar (born 1810)
- 27 October – Robert Collier, 1st Baron Monkswell, lawyer and politician (born 1817)
- 11 December - Arsenal Football Club played its first game, known then as Dial Square
