= Adrian Littlejohn =

English footballer (born 1970)

Personal information
- Full name: Adrian Sylvester Littlejohn
- Date of birth: 26 September 1970 (age 56)
- Place of birth: Wolverhampton, England
- Height: 5 ft 10 in (1.78 m)
- Positions: Midfielder; forward

Youth career
- 1988–1989: West Bromwich Albion

Senior career*
| Years | Team | Apps | (Gls) |
| 1989–1991 | Walsall | 44 | (1) |
| 1991–1995 | Sheffield United | 69 | (12) |
| 1995–1998 | Plymouth Argyle | 110 | (29) |
| 1998 | Oldham Athletic | 21 | (5) |
| 1998–2001 | Bury | 99 | (14) |
| 2001–2003 | Sheffield United | 3 | (0) |
| 2003–2004 | Port Vale | 49 | (10) |
| 2004–2005 | Lincoln City | 8 | (0) |
| 2005 | Rushden & Diamonds | 15 | (0) |
| 2005–2006 | Mansfield Town | 7 | (0) |
| 2006 | Leek Town | 4 | (0) |
| 2007–2008 | Retford United | | |
| Total | | 429 | (71) |

International career
| 1986–1987 | England U16 | 6 | (0) |
- * Club domestic league appearances and goals

Adrian Sylvester Littlejohn (born 26 September 1970) is an English former footballer who played as a midfielder and a striker. He scored 79 goals in 490 league and cup appearances in an 18-year career in the English Football League.

He began his professional career at Walsall after moving from West Bromwich Albion in 1989. He moved on to Sheffield United two years later before making a £100,000 move to Plymouth Argyle in September 1995. He helped Plymouth to win promotion out of the Third Division in 1996 before moving on to Oldham Athletic in March 1998. Eight months later, he was sold to Bury for £75,000. He returned to Sheffield United in October 2001 before transferring to Port Vale in February 2003. In August 2004, he switched to Lincoln City before ending the season at Rushden & Diamonds. In September 2005, he signed with Mansfield Town before moving on to non-League club Leek Town the following year. He retired in 2008 following a brief spell at Retford United.

== Playing career ==
=== Walsall ===
Littlejohn started his footballing career at West Bromwich Albion but failed to play a match and was released at the end of the 1988–89 season to find first-team football elsewhere. He did, though, win six caps for the England U16 team. He stayed in his native West Midlands and joined Walsall before the 1989–90 season; the "Saddlers" finished bottom of the Third Division under John Barnwell's stewardship and were relegated into the Fourth Division. They then finished a disappointing 16th in 1990–91 under Kenny Hibbitt. Littlejohn played 54 games, scoring one goal in his two seasons with the club.

=== Sheffield United ===
Prior to the 1991–92 season, Littlejohn was signed by Dave Bassett of Sheffield United. He played a part in the "Blades" first ever Premier League season in 1992–93, scoring eight goals in 27 games. He scored three goals in 19 top-flight games in 1993–94, as United were relegated to the First Division. He appeared just 18 times in 1994–95 before he moved to Plymouth Argyle for a £100,000 fee in September 1995.

=== Plymouth Argyle ===
Bagging 18 goals, he was the club's top scorer in his debut season at Home Park, which helped Plymouth finish fourth in the Third Division. They were just one point short of automatic promotion, but managed to gain promotion via the play-offs with a 1–0 win over Darlington. The 1996–97 and 1997–98 seasons saw the club involved in relegation battles; Littlejohn had escaped the cycle however, joining Second Division side Oldham Athletic in March 1998.

=== Oldham Athletic to Bury ===
At Oldham, he joined Neil Warnock, the manager, who had signed him up at Plymouth. Littlejohn scored his début against Watford; however, both men's stay at Boundary Park was brief; Bury appointed Warnock manager in May 1998, and six months later he bought Littlejohn for £75,000. The "Shakers" occupied the final relegation place in the First Division in 1998–99, finishing behind Port Vale on goals scored. They finished 15th in 1999–2000 under new boss Andy Preece, with Littlejohn scoring 10 times in his 48 appearances. He scored five goals in 43 games for the Gigg Lane club in 2000–01, and in total scored 16 goals in 112 games in close to three seasons at the club.

=== Sheffield United to Port Vale ===
In December 1999, Warnock was made manager of Sheffield United. In October 2001, he brought Littlejohn back to the club, on a non-contract basis. He remained loyal to Warnock, refusing to sign a permanent contract with Carlisle United. However, he was to only play three competitive matches for the first-team in 2001–02, two of those coming from off the bench. Leaving the club in February 2003, he rejected the chance to sign with Bradford City, and instead signed with Port Vale. After impressing manager Brian Horton, his initial one-month deal was extended to the end of the season. He then went on to score seven goals in 41 appearances in the 2003–04 campaign. He was released by new manager Martin Foyle and rejected the offer of a short-term contract with Scunthorpe United.

=== Later career ===
In August 2004, he put pen to paper with League Two side Lincoln City. Failing to make at impact at Sincil Bank, he was released by manager Keith Alexander in January 2005. He then joined Rushden & Diamonds on a contract expiring at the end of the season. The veteran striker made 15 appearances for Ernie Tippett's side and also gave the younger players the benefit of his experience. In September 2005 he signed with Mansfield Town, making seven substitute appearances in the league over the course of the 2005–06 season for Peter Shirtliff's "Stags". He wound his career down with a few games for non-League Leek Town, playing for the club from March to October in 2006. In June 2007, Littlejohn agreed to return to playing at Retford United for his old teammate Peter Duffield before leaving the club at the end of the season.

== Coaching career ==
Towards the end of his playing days, Littlejohn began working at the Sheffield United academy. Littlejohn ventured into physiotherapy in 2014, and took up a position as academy physiotherapist at Rotherham United. By September 2019, he was working as Cardiff City's first-team physio.

== Career statistics ==
Appearances and goals by club, season and competition
| Club | Season | League | | | FA Cup | | Other | | Total | |
| Club | Season | Division | Apps | Goals | Apps | Goals | Apps | Goals | Apps | Goals |
|---|---|---|---|---|---|---|---|---|---|---|
| Walsall | 1989–90 | Third Division | 11 | 0 | 1 | 0 | 3 | 0 | 15 | 0 |
| Walsall | 1990–91 | Fourth Division | 33 | 1 | 1 | 0 | 5 | 0 | 39 | 1 |
| Walsall | Total | | 44 | 1 | 2 | 0 | 8 | 0 | 54 | 1 |
| Sheffield United | 1991–92 | First Division | 7 | 0 | 0 | 0 | 1 | 0 | 8 | 0 |
| Sheffield United | 1992–93 | Premier League | 27 | 8 | 5 | 1 | 3 | 0 | 35 | 9 |
| Sheffield United | 1993–94 | Premier League | 19 | 3 | 0 | 0 | 1 | 0 | 20 | 3 |
| Sheffield United | 1994–95 | First Division | 16 | 1 | 0 | 0 | 3 | 1 | 19 | 2 |
| Sheffield United | Total | | 69 | 12 | 5 | 1 | 8 | 1 | 82 | 14 |
| Plymouth Argyle | 1995–96 | Third Division | 42 | 17 | 3 | 1 | 5 | 0 | 50 | 18 |
| Plymouth Argyle | 1996–97 | Second Division | 37 | 6 | 3 | 2 | 5 | 0 | 45 | 8 |
| Plymouth Argyle | 1997–98 | Second Division | 31 | 6 | 2 | 0 | 2 | 0 | 35 | 6 |
| Plymouth Argyle | Total | | 110 | 29 | 8 | 3 | 12 | 0 | 130 | 32 |
| Oldham Athletic | 1997–98 | Second Division | 5 | 3 | 0 | 0 | 0 | 0 | 5 | 3 |
| Oldham Athletic | 1998–99 | Second Division | 16 | 2 | 0 | 0 | 2 | 1 | 18 | 3 |
| Oldham Athletic | Total | | 21 | 5 | 0 | 0 | 2 | 1 | 23 | 6 |
| Bury | 1998–99 | First Division | 20 | 1 | 1 | 0 | 0 | 0 | 21 | 1 |
| Bury | 1999–2000 | Second Division | 42 | 9 | 3 | 1 | 3 | 0 | 48 | 10 |
| Bury | 2000–01 | Second Division | 37 | 4 | 2 | 0 | 4 | 1 | 43 | 5 |
| Bury | Total | | 99 | 14 | 6 | 1 | 7 | 1 | 112 | 16 |
| Sheffield United | 2001–02 | First Division | 3 | 0 | 0 | 0 | 0 | 0 | 3 | 0 |
| Port Vale | 2002–03 | Second Division | 13 | 3 | 0 | 0 | 0 | 0 | 13 | 3 |
| Port Vale | 2003–04 | Second Division | 36 | 7 | 3 | 0 | 2 | 0 | 41 | 7 |
| Port Vale | Total | | 49 | 10 | 3 | 0 | 2 | 0 | 54 | 10 |
| Lincoln City | 2004–05 | League Two | 8 | 0 | 1 | 0 | 0 | 0 | 9 | 0 |
| Rushden & Diamonds | 2004–05 | League Two | 15 | 0 | 0 | 0 | 0 | 0 | 15 | 0 |
| Mansfield Town | 2004–05 | League Two | 7 | 0 | 0 | 0 | 1 | 0 | 8 | 0 |
| Leek Town | 2005–06 | Northern Premier League; Premier Division | 4 | 0 | 2 | 0 | 0 | 0 | 6 | 0 |
| Career total | | | 429 | 71 | 27 | 5 | 40 | 3 | 496 | 79 |

== Honours ==
Plymouth Argyle

- Football League Third Division play-offs: 1996
