= Mark Barnard =

English footballer

Personal information
- Date of birth: 27 November 1975 (age 50)
- Place of birth: Sheffield, England
- Height: 6 ft 0 in (1.83 m)
- Position: Defender

Senior career*
Years	Team	Apps	(Gls)
1994–1995	Rotherham United	0	(0)
1995	Worksop Town	10	(2)
1995–1999	Darlington	171	(5)
1999–2000	Doncaster Rovers	49	(4)
2000–2002	Northwich Victoria	62	(4)
2002–2003	Worksop Town	25	(1)
2003	Tamworth	6	(0)
2003	Northwich Victoria	8	(0)
2004–2005	Harrogate Town	60	(3)
2005–2006	Stalybridge Celtic	38	(2)
2006–2008	Alfreton Town	23	(2)
2008–2011	Belper Town	69	(3)
2000-2002	England C	2	(1)
Total		523	(27)
- * Club domestic league appearances and goals as of 12:50, 1 March 2014

Mark Barnard (born 27 November 1975) is an English former professional footballer, who is now retired. Barnard was a forward who converted to left wing back or left-back. An attacking minded left sided player with an excellent left foot and his fitness was amongst the best in the wing back position.

Barnard aka 'Barney' started his career back in July 1994 with Rotherham United as a trainee. After failing to make it into the first team setup, Barnard moved on to Worksop Town.

After impressing during his time with The Tigers, Barnard earned a move to Darlington, where he then went on to make 171 league and cup appearances and scored 4 goals for the club.

Four-seasons later saw Barnard join Doncaster Rovers, before moving on to Northwich Victoria. During this period Barnard made 2 appearances for England C scoring 1 goal.

Barnard later had spells with Worksop Town (second spell), Tamworth, Northwich Victoria (second spell) Alfreton Town and Belper Town.

== Honours ==
=== As a player ===
Darlington

- Football League Third Division play-offs runner-up: 1996
