= Paul Mattison =

English footballer

Personal information
- Full name: Paul Andrew Mattison
- Date of birth: 24 April 1973 (age 53)
- Place of birth: Wakefield, England
- Position: Midfielder

Senior career*
Years	Team	Apps	(Gls)
1993–1994	North Ferriby United		
1994–1996	Darlington	17	(0)
1996	Guiseley		
1996–1997	Farsley Celtic		
1997–2006	Glasshoughton Welfare		
- * Club domestic league appearances and goals

Paul Andrew Mattison (born 24 April 1973) was an English footballer who played as a midfielder for Darlington in The Football League.
