= Paul Wotton =

English footballer (born 1977)

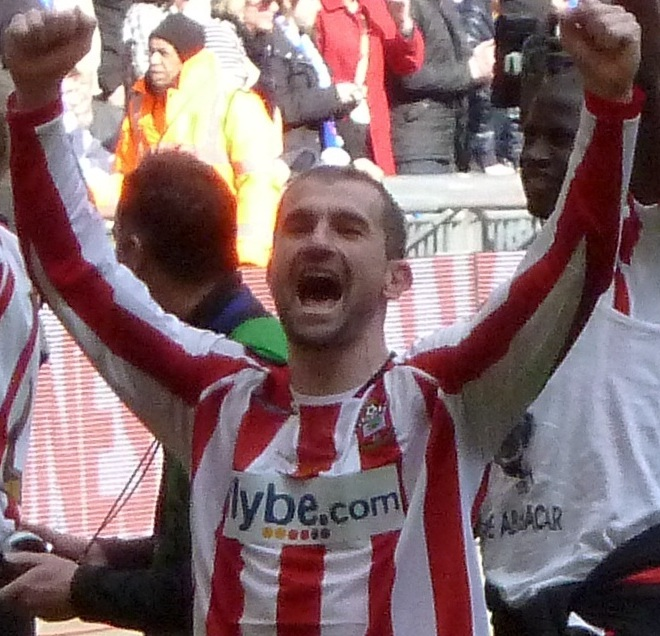

Personal information
- Full name: Paul Anthony Wotton
- Date of birth: 17 August 1977 (age 49)
- Place of birth: Plymouth, England
- Height: 5 ft 11 in (1.80 m)
- Positions: Centre-back; defensive midfielder

Team information
- Current team: Kidderminster Harriers (manager)

Senior career*
Years	Team	Apps	(Gls)
1994–2008	Plymouth Argyle	394	(54)
2008–2011	Southampton	57	(0)
2010	→ Oxford United (loan)	4	(0)
2010–2011	→ Yeovil Town (loan)	6	(0)
2011–2012	Yeovil Town	39	(4)
2012–2015	Plymouth Argyle	52	(3)
Total		552	(61)

Managerial career
- 2019–2024: Truro City
- 2024–2026: Torquay United
- 2026–: Kidderminster Harriers
- * Club domestic league appearances and goals

Paul Anthony Wotton (born 17 August 1977) is an English former professional footballer who is currently manager of National League club Kidderminster Harriers.

Having begun his career with his home-town side, Wotton went on to become the club's most successful captain as they won two Football League titles in three seasons. By the time he left Plymouth in 2008, Wotton had broken into the top ten of the club's all-time appearance list – playing in more than 400 matches – and won their Player of the Year award twice. A year later, he was inducted into the club's Hall of Fame.

Wotton went on to spend three seasons with Southampton, with whom he won the Football League Trophy at Wembley Stadium during the 2009–10 season. Towards the end of his time with the club, he was loaned out to Oxford United and Yeovil Town before joining the latter permanently. A year later, Wotton returned to Plymouth Argyle. He was appointed player-coach at Argyle at the end of the 2013–14 season and formally retired from playing the following year.

Renowned for his leadership and powerful shot, Wotton played at both centre half and defensive midfield and was considered a specialist at set pieces. Wotton also got recognised as for all but one of his seasons at Plymouth, he had worn the no.15 shirt. "It was my first squad number. I came in for pre-season while I was in a contract dispute with the club. I was raging. I thought, me being me, if you weren't (numbers) 1–11, you weren't fancied. I was really disappointed because I was a regular in the team. When I came back and things went really well, I just stayed (number) 15."

== Playing career ==
=== Plymouth Argyle ===
Wotton was born in Plymouth, Devon, and started his playing career with his hometown club. His first season for Plymouth Argyle was also his first as a professional, under Steve McCall in 1994–95. After Argyle were relegated from the Second Division at the end of the 1997–98 season following defeat at Burnley he famously vowed that he would be part of the side that won promotion, and captained the side to the title with a record 102 points in 2001–02 whilst being named in the PFA Division Three team of the year. Two seasons later he again lifted some silverware, this time the Division Two championship. He was named the player of the season for Argyle for the following 2004–05 season, in which the team finished 17th. He appeared in the famous Jimmy Glass game against Carlisle, in which the goalkeeper scored in the 94th minute to keep Carlisle United in the Football League.

Wotton could be described as a solid and mature defender with a ferocious shot taking ability that resulted in him taking the majority of free-kicks and penalties during his first spell at Argyle. Playing at centre back during Argyle's Third and Second Division championship winning seasons, his slight lack of pace meant that in the Championship he usually played holding midfield role in front of the defence. He was the top-scorer in 2004–05 with 12 league goals, an excellent return for a non-striker, and again in 2005–06 with 8 goals.

In the summer of 2006, he was involved in an incident with young striker Chris Zebroski during a pre-season tour of Austria, which required Wotton to have more than a hundred stitches in his head. Zebroski was sacked less than a month later, having been found guilty of gross misconduct.

In the Championship match against Hull City on 9 December 2006 he damaged his cruciate and medial ligaments to his left knee and missed the rest of the 2006–07 Championship season. He returned from injury in time for Paul Sturrock's return to the club as manager, and after making a handful of substitute appearances he returned to the side for his first start in 15 months in the 2–1 win at Bristol City on 15 March 2008. He later went on to score a penalty in his final ever game for Plymouth against Preston North End, shortly before being released.

His autobiography, My Journey: The First Ten Years, was published in 2004.

=== Southampton ===
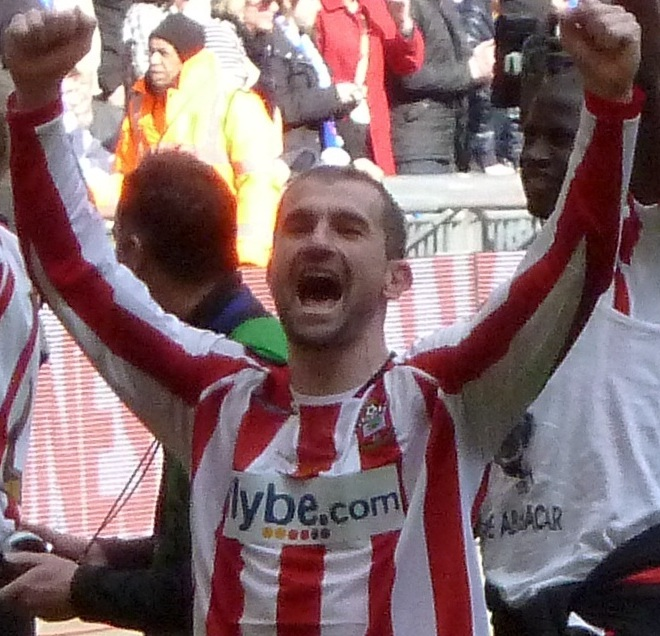
Wotton after the 2010 Football League Trophy Final at Wembley Stadium

In June 2008, Wotton was released by Plymouth. On 18 June he joined Southampton. In his first start he came up against former club Plymouth's archrivals, Exeter City, in the first round of a League Cup match that Southampton comfortably won 3–1.

In March of the 2009-10 season, Wotton got his first taste of silverware away from Argyle, when he played in central midfield for 85 minutes of the 2010 Football League Trophy Final, winning 4–1 against Carlisle United.

On 8 November 2010, he joined Oxford United until the end of December on an emergency loan. On 31 December 2010, Wotton joined Yeovil Town on a one-month loan.

=== Yeovil Town ===
On 1 January 2011, Wotton made his debut for Yeovil away in a 0–0 draw to his old side Plymouth, for whom he played for 13 years clocking up nearly 400 appearances, and he received a standing ovation from the Argyle fans when his name was called out on the PA system. He played the full 90 minutes as the two sides played out a 0–0 draw. On 28 January 2011, Wotton's contract with Southampton was terminated "by mutual consent", and he made a permanent move to Huish Park on an 18-month contract. He scored his first Yeovil goal in the 2–1 win away to Brentford; a characteristic free kick from 25 yards out.

On 12 January 2012, his contract was cancelled by mutual consent.

=== Return to Argyle ===
Wotton rejoined Plymouth Argyle later that day, three and a half years after being released when the club were in the Championship. He signed an 18-month contract. "Paul has got a lot of experience, has a good knowledge of the game, he's determined and has a real will to win. We are pleased to have him on board," said manager Carl Fletcher. "When I spoke to Paul about coming back he made it clear he would have walked here on broken glass." Wotton made a winning return to the Argyle side as they defeated Burton Albion 2–1 at Home Park on 14 January.

At the end of the 2013–14 season, Wotton signed a new one-year contract to become a player-coach at Home Park replacing Gary Owers who had left the club. Wotton at this point was Argyle's second highest appearance maker on 491 games, but still some way behind Kevin Hodges.

Wotton formally retired from playing on 15 May 2015, having not played for the entirety of the 2014–15 season. Wotton's last competitive game for the club was in a 3–3 draw with Portsmouth, on the final day of the 2013–14 season.

== Coaching career ==
New Argyle manager Derek Adams kept Wotton on as first-team coach at Argyle for the 2015–16 season, with Adams stating that he needed someone on board who knew the club. Wotton became a main-stay as a staff member under Adams, and for the 2017–18 season took on management duties for Argyle's Central League South team.

On 8 May 2018, it was announced that Wotton would step up to the role of assistant manager for the 2018–19 season, following the departure of Craig Brewster. On 28 April 2019, Wotton and Adams were both sacked by Argyle with the club in the League One relegation zone with one game left of the season, following a 5–1 defeat at Accrington Stanley. Wotton's dismissal came hours after he completed the London Marathon.

On 4 July 2019, it was announced that Wotton had agreed to become the manager of Truro City of the Southern League Premier Division South. The 2022–23 season saw Wotton lead Truro to promotion through the play-offs, returning to the National League South after four years away from the level.

On 14 May 2024, Wotton was appointed manager of fellow National League South side Torquay United on an initial three-year contract, officially taking the post once the Bryn Consortium confirmed their takeover. On 1 March 2026, following a 5–0 home defeat against Chelmsford City a day prior, Wotton was sacked as Torquay manager..

On 26 May 2026, Wotton was appointed manager of newly promoted National League club Kidderminster Harriers.

== Career statistics ==
Appearances and goals by club, season and competition
Club	Season	League			FA Cup		League Cup		Other		Total	
Club	Season	Division	Apps	Goals	Apps	Goals	Apps	Goals	Apps	Goals	Apps	Goals
Plymouth Argyle	1994–95	Second Division	7	0	0	0	0	0	0	0	7	0
Plymouth Argyle	1995–96	Third Division	1	0	0	0	0	0	2	0	3	0
Plymouth Argyle	1996–97	Second Division	9	1	2	0	0	0	2	0	13	1
Plymouth Argyle	1997–98	Second Division	34	1	2	0	2	0	1	0	39	1
Plymouth Argyle	1998–99	Third Division	36	1	5	1	2	0	0	0	43	2
Plymouth Argyle	1999–2000	Third Division	23	0	1	0	0	0	1	0	25	0
Plymouth Argyle	2000–01	Third Division	42	4	2	0	1	0	1	0	45	4
Plymouth Argyle	2001–02	Third Division	46	5	4	1	1	0	1	0	52	6
Plymouth Argyle	2002–03	Second Division	43	8	4	3	1	0	0	0	48	11
Plymouth Argyle	2003–04	Second Division	38	9	1	0	1	0	2	0	42	9
Plymouth Argyle	2004–05	Championship	40	12	1	0	1	1	—		42	13
Plymouth Argyle	2005–06	Championship	45	8	1	0	1	1	—		47	9
Plymouth Argyle	2006–07	Championship	22	4	0	0	1	0	—		23	4
Plymouth Argyle	2007–08	Championship	8	1	0	0	0	0	—		8	1
Plymouth Argyle	Total		394	54	23	5	11	2	10	0	438	61
Southampton	2008–09	Championship	29	0	0	0	3	0	—		32	0
Southampton	2009–10	League One	16	0	3	0	2	0	5	0	26	0
Southampton	2010–11	League One	2	0	0	0	1	0	0	0	3	0
Southampton	Total		47	0	3	0	6	0	5	0	61	0
Oxford United (loan)	2010–11	League Two	4	0	—		—		—		4	0
Yeovil Town	2010–11	League One	23	2	—		—		—		23	2
Yeovil Town	2011–12	League One	22	2	3	0	2	0	1	0	27	3
Yeovil Town	Total		45	4	3	0	2	0	1	0	51	4
Plymouth Argyle	2011–12	League Two	18	1	—		—		—		18	1
Plymouth Argyle	2012–13	League Two	19	2	0	0	1	0	0	0	20	2
Plymouth Argyle	2013–14	League Two	15	0	0	0	0	0	0	0	15	0
Plymouth Argyle	2014–15	League Two	0	0	0	0	0	0	0	0	0	0
Plymouth Argyle	Total		52	3	0	0	1	0	0	0	53	3
Career total			565	61	29	5	20	3	16	0	620	71

== Managerial statistics ==
As of 21 November 2026

Managerial record by team and tenure
Team	Nat	From	To	Record								Ref
Team	Nat	From	To	G	W	D	L	GF	GA	GD	Win %	Ref
Truro City	(England)	4 July 2019	14 May 2024	192	99	37	56	330	239	+91	51.56	
Torquay United	(England)	14 May 2024	1 March 2026	87	44	20	23	139	102	+37	50.57	
Kidderminster Harriers	(England)	26 May 2026	Present	20	7	8	5	25	20	+5	35.00	
Total				299	150	65	84	494	361	+133	50.17	—

== Honours ==
=== As a player ===
Plymouth Argyle

- Football League Second Division: 2003–04
- Football League Third Division: 2001–02

Southampton

- Football League Trophy: 2009–10

Individual

- PFA Team of the Year: 2001–02 Third Division
- Plymouth Argyle Player of the Season: 2002–03, 2004–05

=== As a manager ===
Truro City

- Southern League Premier Division South play-offs: 2023

Individual

- National League South Manager of the Month: December 2023, November 2024, January 2026
