= Darren Bastow =

English footballer

Personal information
- Date of birth: 22 December 1981 (age 44)
- Place of birth: Torquay, England
- Position: Midfielder

Team information
- Current team: Upton Athletic

Youth career
- Torre Trojans
- 1998: Plymouth Argyle

Senior career*
Years	Team	Apps	(Gls)
1998–2001	Plymouth Argyle	42	(3)
2001–2014	Upton Athletic		
2014–2015	Moretonhampstead		
2015–	Upton Athletic		
- * Club domestic league appearances and goals

Darren Bastow (born 22 December 1981 in Torquay) is an English former professional footballer who played in the Football League as a midfielder for Plymouth Argyle. He currently plays for South Devon League club Upton Athletic.

== Career ==
Bastow began his career as an apprentice at Plymouth Argyle, joining the Home Park side in July 1998 after leaving Torquay Community College. He had been spotted by Argyle youth development officer John James while playing for Torre Trojans. He became the youngest ever goalscorer for Plymouth when he scored on his league debut, after coming on as substitute in the 3–0 home victory against Brentford in November 1998. After a further nine first-team appearances while still a trainee, and favourable press coverage, he signed a professional contract on his 17th birthday. His form soon attracted the attention of higher division sides, and in November 1999 he joined Premier League Derby County on trial, playing a reserve match against Coventry City. At the end of his trial he returned to Home Park, but was left out of the squad in early 2000 for disciplinary reasons. The player had problems off the field and walked out on the club, although Argyle retained his registration and refused to let him play even for South Devon League side Upton Athletic.

In October 2000 he briefly returned to Plymouth Argyle and resumed training, but later walked out again. He eventually returned to playing football, joining Upton Athletic on non-contract terms in August 2001. He agreed to join Torquay United on trial in October 2001, but nothing came of it, and he continued to play for Upton Athletic alongside other members of his family, including former Torquay player Ian Bastow, also spending a season at Moretonhampstead.
