= Gary Twynham =

English footballer

Personal information
- Full name: Gary Steven Twynham
- Date of birth: 8 February 1976 (age 50)
- Place of birth: Manchester, England
- Height: 6 ft 0 in (1.83 m)
- Position: Midfielder

Senior career*
Years	Team	Apps	(Gls)
1994–1996	Manchester United	0	(0)
1996–1997	Darlington	28	(3)
1997–1998	Gateshead	?	(?)
1998–1999	Grantham Town	?	(?)
1998	→ Lincoln City (loan)	0	(0)
1999–2000	Hednesford Town	29	(1)
2000–2001	Macclesfield Town	9	(0)
2001–2002	Haverfordwest County	6	(2)
2002–2003	Port Talbot Town	36	(7)
2003–2004	Barry Town	5	(1)
- * Club domestic league appearances and goals

Gary Steven Twynham (born 8 February 1976) is an English former footballer who played as a midfielder for Darlington and Macclesfield Town in the Football League.
