= Ian Bastow =

English footballer

Personal information
- Full name: Ian John Bastow
- Date of birth: 12 August 1971 (age 55)
- Place of birth: Torquay, England
- Position: Midfielder

Senior career*
Years	Team	Apps	(Gls)
1988–1990	Torquay United	11	(0)
- Dawlish United
- * Club domestic league appearances and goals

Ian John Bastow (born 12 August 1971) is an English former professional football midfielder who played for Torquay United.
