= Jon Ashton (footballer, born 1979) =

English footballer (born 1979)

Personal information
- Full name: Jon Frank Ashton
- Date of birth: 4 August 1979 (age 47)
- Place of birth: Plymouth, England
- Position: Defender

Senior career*
Years	Team	Apps	(Gls)
1997–2000	Plymouth Argyle	34	(0)
2000–2001	Exeter City	13	(0)
2001–2002	Hayes	20	(0)
- Dulwich Hamlet
- Bodmin Town
- Bridgwater Town
- Paulton Rovers
- * Club domestic league appearances and goals

Jon Ashton (born 4 August 1979) is an English former footballer who played as a defender. He made 47 appearances in the Football League for Plymouth Argyle and Exeter City. He also played non-league football for Hayes and Dulwich Hamlet

== Playing career ==
Ashton was born in Plymouth. He began his career with Plymouth Argyle and made his first team debut in August 1997. In three seasons with the club, he made 44 appearances in all competitions before joining Exeter City in the summer of 2000. Ashton played in 13 league games during one season with the club, and then spent a year with Hayes, where he made 22 appearances in all competitions. He went on to play for Dulwich Hamlet, Bodmin Town, Bridgwater Town and Paulton Rovers. Retired due to an Achilles injury aged 26. Working in the financial services sector since 2003.
