= Mickey Evans (footballer, born 1973) =

Footballer (born 1973)

Personal information
- Full name: Michael James Evans
- Date of birth: 1 January 1973 (age 53)
- Place of birth: Plymouth, England
- Height: 6 ft 0 in (1.83 m)
- Position: Forward

Youth career
- 1987–1991: Plymouth Argyle

Senior career*
Years	Team	Apps	(Gls)
1990–1997	Plymouth Argyle	163	(38)
1992	→ Blackburn Rovers (loan)	0	(0)
1997	Southampton	22	(4)
1997–2000	West Bromwich Albion	63	(6)
2000	→ Bristol Rovers (loan)	2	(1)
2000–2001	Bristol Rovers	19	(3)
2001–2006	Plymouth Argyle	221	(34)
2006	Torquay United	14	(1)
Total		504	(87)

International career
1997	Republic of Ireland	1	(0)
- * Club domestic league appearances and goals

Michael James Evans (born 1 January 1973) is a former professional footballer who played as a forward. He spent most of his career with Plymouth Argyle, for whom he scored 73 goals in 384 appearances in the Football League. He also played in the Premier League for Southampton and the Football League for West Bromwich Albion, Bristol Rovers and Torquay United. Born in England, Evans earned one cap for the Republic of Ireland at full international level.

== Club career ==
=== Plymouth Argyle ===
Evans originally joined Plymouth Argyle in December 1987 as an associate schoolboy. He made his first team debut in December 1990 at the age of 17, and signed his first professional contract in March 1991.

He was a member of Neil Warnock's Plymouth side which won promotion from the Third Division via the play-offs in 1996. Following that success, in March 1997 he was signed by Graeme Souness at Southampton for £650,000.

=== Southampton ===
Souness signed Evans to add a bit of muscle to the forward line as Southampton entered the final lap of a desperate fight to avoid relegation from the Premier League in the 1996–97 season.

He was a big and brave striker and scored four crucial goals as Saints beat the drop, finishing in 16th position. His greatest game in a Saints shirt came at Nottingham Forest's City Ground, where he scored a brace. For the second goal, he sprinted from the half-way line, taking a pass from Eyal Berkovic to beat goalkeeper Mark Crossley who could only half block the shot.

He followed this up with two more goals against West Ham United and Coventry City, and his form in April 1997 was such that he was awarded the Premiership Player-of-the-Month Trophy.

Evans became somewhat of a cult figure amongst Southampton fans which many of them making a tongue-in-cheek reference to his West Country roots by wearing straw hats and having straw hanging from their mouths as well as donning fake versions of Evans' then trademark bushy sideburns. Saints fans attributed their Premier League survival solely to Evans' goals and performances during that period.

The following season, Souness had been replaced as Saints' manager by Dave Jones and Evans lost his place to Kevin Davies. Although he was to make a handful of appearances in the 1997–98 season, his career at The Dell only lasted just over six months and in October 1997 he moved on to West Bromwich Albion for a fee of £750,000.

A few days before his transfer to The Hawthorns, he won a Republic of Ireland cap against Romania.

=== West Bromwich Albion and Bristol Rovers ===
Evans made his Albion debut on 29 November 1997, coming on as a late substitute in a 1–0 defeat away at Middlesbrough. Used mainly as a substitute during 1997–98, it took him 12 games to register his first goal for the club, scoring in a 2–0 win at Swindon Town on 7 February 1998. Evans' time at West Brom was frequently blighted by injury and illness. It wasn't until his later return to Plymouth when it was discovered that Evans had an asthmatic-related complaint which had contributed to his lack of form and fitness. He was loaned out to Bristol Rovers, a successful spell which led to a £250,000 permanent deal being struck in September 2000.

=== Back to Argyle ===
After an unsuccessful spell at Bristol Rovers, Evans then returned to Plymouth Argyle as one of the first signings of Paul Sturrock, joining on transfer deadline day 2001 for £30,000.

Although not a prolific goalscorer, after the diagnosis of his condition, the now healthier Evans played an important role in the Pilgrims' recent success; in particular his hold-up play and lay-offs created numerous goalscoring opportunities for his teammates. He scored the opening goal in Argyle's 4–1 Third Division Championship match sealing victory at Darlington in the 2001–02 season.

He was named Argyle's "Player of the Year" during their title-winning Division Two campaign in 2003–04. He scored the opening goal in the 2–0 home victory over Q.P.R which was decisive in confirming Plymouth Argyle as that season's Division Two champions.

The 33-year-old Plymothian announced his decision to leave Plymouth Argyle, saying "the time is right for me to move on", with effect from the Pilgrims' final Championship game of the season on 30 April 2006.

Evans scored the winning goal with a diving header in his last appearance for Plymouth Argyle against Ipswich Town, to secure the club a 14th-place finish in the Football League Championship (the highest finish for the club in two decades) and forever sealing his status as a Plymouth Argyle "legend" amongst the club's fans.

=== Final year and retirement ===
On 18 May 2006, Evans signed on a free transfer for local rivals Torquay United, where he scored once against Bury. On 24 November 2006, he decided to retire from professional football, a decision coinciding with a period of deep unrest among Torquay United's players.

== International career ==
Evans' only cap for the Republic of Ireland national football team was against Romania in a 1998 World Cup Qualifier at Lansdowne Road on 11 October 1997. He came on in the 85th minute to replace Tony Cascarino.

== Personal life ==
Evans attended St Boniface's Catholic College and played Junior football for Prince Rock Youth during his schools days. He is nicknamed "Trigger" after a character from Only Fools and Horses. During his second spell with his hometown club he set up his building company MJ Evans. In 2007 and 2008, having retired from playing, Evans was involved in a series of testimonial events to raise money for five local charities. In July 2012, the company filed for administration.

== Career statistics ==
Appearances and goals by club, season and competition
Club	Season	League		FA Cup		League Cup		Other		Total	
Club	Season	Apps	Goals	Apps	Goals	Apps	Goals	Apps	Goals	Apps	Goals
Plymouth Argyle	1990–91	4	0	0	0	0	0	0	0	4	0
Plymouth Argyle	1991–92	13	0	0	0	0	0	1	1	14	1
Plymouth Argyle	1992–93	23	1	1	0	3	0	0	0	27	1
Plymouth Argyle	1993–94	22	9	2	0	1	0	0	0	25	9
Plymouth Argyle	1994–95	23	4	3	0	2	0	1	0	29	4
Plymouth Argyle	1995–96	45	13	3	0	1	0	5	1	54	14
Plymouth Argyle	1996–97	33	12	3	3	2	0	3	0	41	15
Plymouth Argyle	Total	163	39	12	3	9	0	10	2	194	44
Southampton	1996–97	12	4	0	0	0	0	0	0	12	4
Southampton	1997–98	10	0	0	0	3	1	0	0	13	1
Southampton	Total	22	4	0	0	3	1	0	0	25	5
West Bromwich Albion	1997–98	10	1	2	0	0	0	0	0	12	1
West Bromwich Albion	1998–99	20	2	0	0	2	1	0	0	22	3
West Bromwich Albion	1999–2000	33	3	2	1	4	1	0	0	39	5
West Bromwich Albion	Total	63	6	4	1	6	2	0	0	73	9
Bristol Rovers	2000–01	21	4	0	0	2	0	3	2	26	6
Plymouth Argyle	2000–01	10	4	0	0	0	0	0	0	10	4
Plymouth Argyle	2001–02	38	7	3	0	1	0	1	0	43	7
Plymouth Argyle	2002–03	42	4	4	1	1	0	1	1	48	6
Plymouth Argyle	2003–04	44	11	1	0	1	1	1	1	47	13
Plymouth Argyle	2004–05	42	4	1	0	1	0	0	0	44	4
Plymouth Argyle	2005–06	45	4	1	0	1	0	0	0	47	4
Plymouth Argyle	Total	221	34	10	1	5	1	3	2	239	38
Torquay United	2006–07	14	1	1	0	1	0	1	0	17	1
Career total		504	88	27	5	26	4	17	6	574	103

== Honours ==
Plymouth Argyle

- Football League Second Division: 2003–04
- Football League Third Division: 2001–02; play-offs: 1996

Individual

- Premier League Player of the Month: April 1997
- Plymouth Argyle Player of the Year: 2003–04

== See also ==
- List of Republic of Ireland international footballers born outside the Republic of Ireland
