= Mick Heathcote =

English footballer

Personal information
- Full name: Michael Heathcote
- Date of birth: 10 September 1965 (age 61)
- Place of birth: Kelloe, England
- Position: Centre back

Senior career*
Years	Team	Apps	(Gls)
- Spennymoor United
1987–1990	Sunderland	9	(0)
1987–1988	→ Halifax Town (loan)	7	(1)
1990	→ York City (loan)	3	(0)
1990–1991	Shrewsbury Town	44	(6)
1991–1995	Cambridge United	128	(13)
1995–2001	Plymouth Argyle	199	(13)
2001–2003	Shrewsbury Town	40	(2)
2004	Colwyn Bay		
–	Leek Town		
–	Hucknall Town		
- * Club domestic league appearances and goals

Michael Heathcote (born 10 September 1965) is an English former professional footballer who played as a centre back. He made 430 appearances in the Football League for Sunderland, Halifax Town, York City, Shrewsbury Town, Cambridge United and Plymouth Argyle.

== Playing career ==
Heathcote began his career with Spennymoor United before joining Sunderland in 1987. However, after only four months with the club he went on loan to Halifax Town for a month. In January 1990 he went on loan, again for a month, with York City. He remained at Sunderland for another five months until July 1990, when he signed for Shrewsbury Town for £55,000.

He played 44 matches with Shrewsbury Town, scoring six goals - a respectable record for a central defender. Then, in September 1991 he signed for Division Two side Cambridge United for £150,000. He spent four full seasons there, scoring 13 goals in 128 league appearances. He was then signed by Plymouth Argyle in July 1995 for £75,000. He spent six years at the Westcountry club, scoring 13 goals in 199 league appearances. He helped Argyle earn promotion in his first season with them by winning the Third Division play-offs. In 2001, he started a second spell at Shrewsbury Town. He appeared in the famous Jimmy Glass game against Carlisle, in which the goalkeeper scored in the 94th minute to keep Carlisle United in the Football League.

But after leaving the side in 2004 he spent the remainder of his career in the lower leagues of English football. He played for Colwyn Bay, Leek Town and Hucknall Town. While at Hucknall he played in the 2005 FA Trophy final penalty defeat against Grays Athletic.

== Honours ==
Plymouth Argyle

- Football League Third Division play-offs: 1996

Individual

- PFA Team of the Year: 1995–96 Third Division
