= Gary Clayton =

English footballer

Personal information
- Full name: Gary Clayton
- Date of birth: 2 February 1963 (age 63)
- Place of birth: Sheffield, England
- Height: 5 ft 11 in (1.80 m)
- Position: Midfielder

Youth career
- –: Rotherham United

Senior career*
Years	Team	Apps	(Gls)
–1985	Gainsborough Trinity		
1985–1986	Burton Albion		
1986–1987	Doncaster Rovers	35	(5)
1987–1994	Cambridge United	179	(14)
1991	→ Peterborough United (loan)	4	(0)
1994–1995	Huddersfield Town	19	(1)
1995–1997	Plymouth Argyle	38	(2)
1997–1999	Torquay United	56	(2)
- * Club domestic league appearances and goals

Gary Clayton (born 2 February 1963) is an English former footballer who played as a midfielder. He appeared in the Football League for Doncaster Rovers, Cambridge United, Peterborough United, Huddersfield Town, Plymouth Argyle and Torquay United. Clayton also represented the England semi-professional team.

== Life and career ==
Clayton began his career as an apprentice at Rotherham United, but on failing to make the grade drifted into non-league football. He was working as a plasterer and playing for Gainsborough Trinity when he moved to Burton Albion, then managed by Neil Warnock, for a fee of £1,000. He left to join Doncaster Rovers in August 1986, a relative latecomer to the professional game. He was a regular in his first season and moved to Cambridge United the following June for £10,000. He spent almost 7 years at the Abbey Stadium, other than a brief loan spell with Peterborough United in January 1991, scoring 14 times in 179 league games as Cambridge rose through the Football League. In February 1994 he joined Neil Warnock's Huddersfield Town, costing the Terriers £20,000. In June 1995, Warnock took over at Plymouth Argyle, with Clayton following in August, Chris Billy and £125,000 accompanying Clayton to Plymouth in exchange for Paul Dalton. A regular in his first season at Home Park, he missed most of the following campaign with a knee injury and was released at the end of the season.

At the start of the pre-season period, he rejoined Plymouth to coach the reserves, but on proving his fitness re-signed for Argyle on non-contract terms. He turned down a move to Leyton Orient to remain in Devon, and joined Torquay United on a free transfer on 21 August 1997 as a replacement for the recently departed Charlie Oatway. He scored twice in 56 league games for the Gulls before retiring from league football. He now resides in his home town, Sheffield.
