= Paul Williams (footballer, born 1969) =

English footballer

Personal information
- Full name: Paul Richard Curtis Williams
- Date of birth: 11 September 1969 (age 57)
- Place of birth: Leicester, England
- Position: Defender

Youth career
- Leicester City

Senior career*
Years	Team	Apps	(Gls)
1989–1993	Stockport County	70	(4)
1993–1995	Coventry City	14	(0)
1993–1994	→ West Bromwich Albion (loan)	5	(0)
1994	→ Huddersfield Town (loan)	2	(0)
1995	→ Huddersfield Town (loan)	7	(0)
1995–1998	Plymouth Argyle	131	(4)
1998	Gillingham	10	(1)
1998	→ Bury (loan)	5	(0)
1998–2002	Bury	35	(1)
2002–2003	Leigh RMI	23	(0)
Total		302	(10)

International career
1985	England U16	8	(4)
- * Club domestic league appearances and goals

Paul Richard Curtis Williams (born 11 September 1969) is an English former professional footballer, probably most remembered for his time at Plymouth Argyle in the mid-1990s. While at Stockport County he played alongside another Paul Williams, from Northern Ireland.

== Honours ==
Stockport County

- Associate Members' Cup runner-up: 1991–92

Plymouth Argyle

- Football League Third Division play-offs: 1996

Individual

- PFA Team of the Year: 1995–96 Third Division
