= Richard Logan (footballer, born 1969) =

English footballer (born 1969)

Personal information
- Full name: Richard Anthony Logan
- Date of birth: 24 May 1969 (age 57)
- Place of birth: Barnsley, England
- Positions: Defender; midfielder

Senior career*
Years	Team	Apps	(Gls)
- Worsbrough Bridge Athletic
1989–1990	Belper Town		
1990–1994	Gainsborough Trinity		
1993–1996	Huddersfield Town	45	(1)
1995–1998	Plymouth Argyle	86	(12)
1998–2000	Scunthorpe United	80	(7)
2000–2003	Lincoln City	17	(0)
2002–2003	→ Gainsborough Trinity (loan)		
- * Club domestic league appearances and goals

Richard Anthony Logan (born 24 May 1969) is an English former professional footballer.

He began his career as a midfielder before moving to centre half. He made 228 appearances in the Football League, scoring 20 times for Huddersfield Town, Plymouth Argyle, Scunthorpe United and Lincoln City. He also played Non-League football for Worsbrough Bridge Athletic, Belper Town and Gainsborough Trinity

== Playing career ==
Logan began his career in non-league football with local side Worsbrough Bridge Athletic before moving first to Belper Town and then to Gainsborough Trinity whilst also working as a bricklayer,

He moved into the professional football ranks when Neil Warnock signed him for Huddersfield Town in November 1993. He quickly made an impact with Huddersfield and marked his first season by scoring Town's goal in the 1994 Football League Trophy Final at Wembley; they lost the final 3–1 on penalties to Swansea City.

In the summer of 1995, Warnock left for Plymouth Argyle and in the October returned to Huddersfield to secure the services of Logan for £20,000. Logan remained with Argyle until the summer of 1998 when he returned north to join Scunthorpe United. He remained with the Iron for two seasons before being released following Scunthorpe's relegation at the end of the 1999–2000 season.

Following his release by Scunthorpe United, Logan agreed a three-year contract to join Lincoln City in July 2000. He appeared in Lincoln's first five games of the 2000–01 season before sustaining an ankle injury in the 1–1 away draw with Hull City on 28 August 2000 which sidelined him for a month. Returning to fitness, Logan made a return as a substitute in the 2–0 home defeat to Mansfield Town on 30 September 2000 before suffering a prolapsed disc in his back. The injury required surgery and would keep Logan out of the first team picture for fourteen months.

He returned to the substitutes' bench for the 2–1 home victory against Hull City on 10 November 2001 but a series of niggling injuries meant that it was not until the 2–1 away defeat to Oxford United on 16 February 2002 that he made a first-team appearance, his first for over 16 months.

He began the 2002–03 in Lincoln's first team before suffering a calf strain in the 0–0 draw at Torquay United on 28 September 2002. In a bid to regain fitness Logan was loaned to former club Gainsborough Trinity in November; Trinity were then under the management of Phil Stant who had initially signed Logan for Lincoln. Logan made his debut in the 2–1 home victory over Altrincham on 9 November 2001 and remained with the club for two months before, once again, suffering a prolapsed disc in his back which required surgery and sidelined him for the remainder of the season. With his contract expiring at the end of June 2003, Logan agreed to a deal to terminate his contract two months early.

== Personal life ==
As of 2009, Logan is a builder and is still living in his native Barnsley in Barugh Green.

== Honours ==
Huddersfield Town

- Football League Trophy runner-up: 1993–94

Plymouth Argyle

- Football League Third Division play-offs: 1996

Scunthorpe United

- Football League Third Division play-offs: 1999
