= 1996 Football League play-offs =

Football League play-offs
- Season: 1995–96
- Champions: Leicester City (First Division); Bradford City (Second Division); Plymouth Argyle (Third Division)
- Matches: 15
- Goals: 32 (2.13 per match)
- Biggest home win: Plymouth 3–1 Colchester (Third Division)
- Biggest away win: Blackpool 0–3 Bradford (Second Division)
- Highest scoring: Crewe 2–2 Notts County; Plymouth 3–1 Colchester (4 goals)
- Highest attendance: 73,573 – Crystal Palace v Leicester (First Division final)
- Lowest attendance: 4,931 – Crewe v Notts County (Second Division semi-final)
- Average attendance: 20,567

The Football League play-offs for the 1995–96 season were held in May 1996, with the finals taking place at Wembley Stadium in London. The play-off semi-finals were played over two legs and were contested by the teams who finished in 3rd, 4th, 5th and 6th place in the Football League First Division and Football League Second Division and the 4th, 5th, 6th and 7th placed teams in the Football League Third Division table. The winners of the semi-finals progressed through to the finals, with the winner of these matches gaining promotion for the following season.

== Background ==
The Football League play-offs have been held every year since 1987. They take place for each division following the conclusion of the regular season and are contested by the four clubs finishing below the automatic promotion places.

== First Division ==
Pos	Team	Pld	W	D	L	GF	GA	GD	Pts
3	Crystal Palace	46	20	15	11	67	48	+19	75
4	Stoke City	46	20	13	13	60	49	+11	73
5	Leicester City	46	19	14	13	66	60	+6	71
6	Charlton Athletic	46	17	20	9	57	45	+12	71

=== Semi-finals ===
First leg

12 May 1996
15:00

Charlton Athletic	1–2	Crystal Palace
Newton 1'	Report	Brown 65'; Veart 71'

The Valley, London
Attendance: 14,618
Referee: John Kirkby

12 May 1996
15:00

Leicester City	0–0	Stoke City

Filbert Street, Leicester
Attendance: 20,325
Referee: William Burns

Second leg

15 May 1996
19:45

Crystal Palace	1–0	Charlton Athletic
Houghton 4'	Report

Selhurst Park, London
Attendance: 22,880
Referee: Terry Heilbron

Crystal Palace won 3–1 on aggregate.

15 May 1996
19:45

Stoke City	0–1	Leicester City
		Parker 46'

Victoria Ground, Stoke-on-Trent
Attendance: 21,037
Referee: Gurnam Singh

Leicester City won 1–0 on aggregate.

=== Final ===
27 May 1996
14:00

Crystal Palace	1–2 (a.e.t.)	Leicester City
Roberts 14'		Parker 76' (pen.); Claridge 120'

Wembley Stadium, London
Attendance: 73,573
Referee: David Allison

== Second Division ==
Pos	Team	Pld	W	D	L	GF	GA	GD	Pts
3	Blackpool	46	23	13	10	67	40	+27	82
4	Notts County	46	21	15	10	63	39	+24	78
5	Crewe Alexandra	46	22	7	17	77	60	+17	73
6	Bradford City	46	22	7	17	71	69	+2	73

=== Semi-finals ===
First leg

12 May 1996
15:00

Bradford City	0–2	Blackpool
		Bonner 72'; Ellis 78'

Valley Parade, Bradford
Attendance: 14,273
Referee: Terry Heilbron

12 May 1996
15:00

Crewe Alexandra	2–2	Notts County
Little 3'; Rivers 17'		Finnan 55'; Martindale 90'

Gresty Road, Crewe
Attendance: 4,931
Referee: David Allison

Second leg

15 May 1996
19:30

Blackpool	0–3	Bradford City
		Shutt 39'; Hamilton 68'; Stallard 78'

Bloomfield Road, Blackpool
Attendance: 9,593
Referee: William Burns

Bradford City won 3–2 on aggregate.

15 May 1996
19:45

Notts County	1–0	Crewe Alexandra
Martindale 61'

Meadow Lane, Nottingham
Attendance: 9,640
Referee: Kevin Lynch

Notts County won 3–2 on aggregate.

=== Final ===
26 May 1996
15:00

Bradford City	2–0	Notts County
Hamilton 8'; Stallard 75'

Wembley Stadium, London
Attendance: 39,972
Referee: Gurnam Singh

== Third Division ==
Pos	Team	Pld	W	D	L	GF	GA	GD	Pts
4	Plymouth Argyle	46	22	12	12	68	49	+19	78
5	Darlington	46	20	18	8	60	42	+18	78
6	Hereford United	46	20	14	12	65	47	+18	74
7	Colchester United	46	18	18	10	61	51	+10	72

=== Semi-finals ===
First leg

12 May 1996
15:00

Hereford United	1–2	Darlington
Smith 2'		Gregan 27'; Blake 37'

Edgar Street, Hereford
Attendance: 6,622
Referee: Kevin Lynch

12 May 1996
15:00

Colchester United	1–0	Plymouth Argyle
Kinsella 45'

Layer Road, Colchester
Attendance: 6,511
Referee: Mick Pierce

Second leg

15 May 1996
19:45

Plymouth Argyle	3–1	Colchester United
Evans 3'; Leadbitter 41'; Williams 85'		Kinsella 66'

Home Park, Plymouth
Attendance: 14,525
Referee: John Kirkby

Plymouth Argyle won 3–2 on aggregate.

15 May 1996
19:45

Darlington	2–1	Hereford United
Painter 17'; Appleby 47' (pen.)		White 65'

Feethams, Darlington
Attendance: 6,584
Referee: David Allison

Darlington won 4–2 on aggregate.

=== Final ===
25 May 1996
15:00

Darlington	0–1	Plymouth Argyle
		Mauge 65'

Wembley Stadium, London
Attendance: 43,431
Referee: William Burns
