= Mick Jones (footballer, born 1947) =

English footballer and manager (1947–2022)

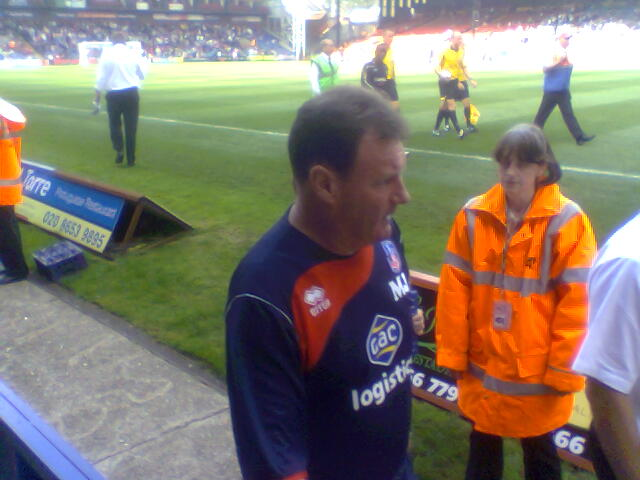
- Jones in 2008

Personal information
- Birth name: Michael Jones
- Date of birth: 24 March 1947
- Place of birth: Sunderland, England
- Date of death: 9 August 2022 (aged 75)
- Position: Defender

Senior career*
Years	Team	Apps	(Gls)
1963–1969	Derby County	0	(0)
1969–1973	Notts County	100	(1)
1973–1976	Peterborough United	88	(4)
1976	Ottawa Tigers		
1976–1977	Kettering Town		

Managerial career
- 1976: Ottawa Tigers
- 1976–1979: Kettering Town
- 1979–1981: Mansfield Town
- 1984–1986: Halifax Town
- 1988–1989: Peterborough United
- 1997–1998: Plymouth Argyle
- 1998–2002: Brunei
- 2003–2004: Telford United
- * Club domestic league appearances and goals

Michael Jones (24 March 1947 – 9 August 2022) was an English professional footballer and coach.

== Playing career ==
Jones started his career as a central defender for Derby County, then managed by Brian Clough, and moved on to Notts County in 1969. Having played a key part in County's promotions in 1971 and 1973 he then moved on to Peterborough United later that year and helped the club to the Division Four championship in his first season, before leaving the country.

== Managerial career ==
Jones spent a brief spell as player-coach at now defunct Canadian outfit Ottawa Tigers in the National Soccer League, before he returned to England in 1976 to fill the manager's role at Kettering Town, initially as player-manager.

A successful spell at Kettering saw them in the FA Trophy final in 1979 and after losing the final to Stafford Rangers, he had his first taste of league management at Mansfield Town. Jones spent two seasons at Mansfield before joining his former teammate Roy McFarland at Bradford City as assistant manager.

After a brief spell at Derby County together the two men went their separate ways, and after Jones had two years in charge of Halifax Town he then joined Peterborough, initially as Noel Cantwell's assistant, before taking over as manager in 1988.

It was at Peterborough that Jones met Neil Warnock whom he would go on to assist at Notts County from 1989 to 1993, and Huddersfield Town from 1993 to 1995, before joining Plymouth Argyle in 1995, once again as Warnock's assistant. After Warnock left Argyle in 1997 Jones had a short, unsuccessful spell as manager at Home Park and on being dismissed in 1998 had a spell managing the Brunei national team, performing an amazing feat in getting the tiny Borneo province to their first ever Malaysia Cup final in 1999, beating Sarawak by two goals to one to collect the trophy.

Jones remained with Brunei until 2002, returning to England for spells as assistant manager at Nuneaton Borough, and then manager of Telford United before financial problems led to the collapse of the club.

In 2005, Jones resumed his partnership with Warnock at Sheffield United. The club was promoted to the Premiership at the end of Jones' first season at the Blades, but was relegated again twelve months later, with both Warnock and Jones stepping down.

After this the two men spent a short period out of football before joining Crystal Palace in October 2007, with the Eagles turning from relegation battlers to play-off semi-finalists under Warnock and Jones' stewardship.

On 1 March 2010. Jones joined Neil Warnock at London rivals Queens Park Rangers, as assistant manager. However, on 8 January 2012, Warnock was sacked as manager of QPR. Jones and Keith Curle were also reported to have left the club.

On 19 February 2012, new Leeds United manager, Neil Warnock confirmed Jones would be his assistant manager. On 1 April 2013 When Warnock was sacked as manager of Leeds United Jones left the club.

On 21 June 2013, Jones was appointed assistant manager at Notts County. He left the club following Chris Kiwomya's departure.

== Later life and death ==
Jones acted as a director of the fine jewellery brand MJ Jones from 2016 to 2021, founded by Jones's son, Matthew J. Jones, in 2012.

Jones died in August 2022, at the age of 75.
