= Dan McCauley =

British businessman (1936–2020)

- Born: 16 January 1936
- Died: March 28, 2020 (aged 84)

Dan McCauley (16 January 1936 – 28 March 2020) was a major shareholder of Sutton Harbour Holdings plc, in which he held a 30% stake. Ranked at 723 on The Times "Rich List 2004" for the UK, his main source of wealth was the company Rotolok Holdings plc which is based in Tiverton.

McCauley was chairman of Plymouth Argyle F.C. when he presided over what most supporters consider the darker years of Argyle's recent history, to the extent that he and his family received several death threats from extremely aggrieved Argyle supporters. In 1995, he purchased Drake's Island in Plymouth Sound with the intention of turning it into a hotel.

He died on 28 March 2020, at the age of 84.
