= Ronnie Mauge =

Trinidad and Tobago footballer

Personal information
- Full name: Ronald Carlton Mauge
- Date of birth: 10 March 1969 (age 57)
- Place of birth: Islington, England
- Height: 1.78 m (5 ft 10 in)
- Position: Midfielder

Youth career
- Charlton Athletic

Senior career*
Years	Team	Apps	(Gls)
1987–1988	Charlton Athletic	0	(0)
1988–1990	Fulham	50	(2)
1990–1995	Bury	108	(10)
1991	→ Manchester City (loan)	0	(0)
1995–1999	Plymouth Argyle	135	(14)
1999–2002	Bristol Rovers	53	(0)
2002	St Albans City	2	(0)
2002–2004	Aldershot Town	0	(0)
2004–2006	Whitton United	58	(3)
Total		347	(29)

International career
2000–2001	Trinidad and Tobago	8	(1)

Managerial career
- 2005–2007: Whitton United
- * Club domestic league appearances and goals

Ronald Carlton Mauge (born 10 March 1969) is a former professional footballer, who played for Fulham, Bury, Manchester City, Plymouth Argyle, and Bristol Rovers. Born in England, he also won caps for the Trinidad and Tobago national team, the homeland of Mauge's parents.

== Biography ==
Born in Islington, Mauge started his career as a trainee at Charlton Athletic, before moving on to Fulham on a free transfer. Two years later he was bought by Bury for £40,000. In 1991, he spent a brief spell as a loan player at Manchester City, where he made one appearance in a minor cup competition. In 1995 Plymouth bought him for £40,000, with Mauge becoming the first Argyle player to score at Wembley as Plymouth defeated Darlington 1–0 in the Third Division play-off final in 1996.

He signed for Bristol Rovers on a free transfer in 1999. In 2000, he was called up to the Trinidad and Tobago squad, which he qualified for through his parents. He played in the Gold Cup, but broke his leg in a first round match against Mexico. Mauge retired from professional football in 2002.

He was later player/manager of non-League side Whitton United, and worked as a Football Development Officer for Ipswich Borough Council.

== Honours ==
Plymouth Argyle

- Football League Third Division play-offs: 1996
