= 2002–03 Plymouth Argyle F.C. season =

English football club season

Plymouth Argyle
2002–03 season
- Chairman: Paul Stapleton
- Manager: Paul Sturrock
- Stadium: Home Park
- Second Division: 8th
- FA Cup: Third Round (eliminated by Dagenham & Redbridge)
- League Cup: First Round (eliminated by Crystal Palace)
- Football League Trophy: Second Round (eliminated by Brentford)
- Top goalscorer: League: Marino Keith (11); All: Marino Keith (12)
- Highest home attendance: 11,922 (vs Bristol City, 26 August 2002)
- Lowest home attendance: 6,835 (vs Brentford, 22 March 2003)
- Average home league attendance: 8,980

The 2002–03 football season was Plymouth Argyle Football Club's 99th consecutive season as a professional club. It began on 1 July 2002, and concluded on 30 June 2003, although competitive games were only played between August and May.

== Season summary ==
The club began the 2002–03 season in the Football League Second Division, following their promotion from the Third Division. They finished in a creditable 8th position, with a record of 17 wins, 14 draws, and 15 defeats, from 46 games. Their leading goalscorer was Marino Keith with 12 goals in all competitions. The club reached the Third Round of the FA Cup, drawing 2–2 at home with Dagenham & Redbridge before losing the replay 2–0. They entered the League Cup at the First Round stage and were eliminated away to Crystal Palace 2–1 after extra-time. They also competed in the Football League Trophy where they reached the Second Round before being defeated 2–0 at home by Brentford. Notable players to begin their careers with the Pilgrims this season included David Norris, Tony Capaldi, Hasney Aljofree, and Nathan Lowndes.

Legend

Win Draw Loss

=== Football League ===
10 August 2002	Mansfield Town	4–3	Plymouth Argyle	Field Mill, Mansfield
	White 32' 67'; Disley 51'; Larkin 55'	(Report)	Evans 24'; Friio 86'; Lowndes 90'	Attendance: 5,309; Referee: G Frankland

13 August 2002	Plymouth Argyle	2–1	Huddersfield Town	Home Park, Plymouth
	Friio 58'; Wotton 90'	(Report)	Thorrington 89'	Attendance: 8,953; Referee: B Curson

17 August 2002	Plymouth Argyle	2–1	Luton Town	Home Park, Plymouth
	McGlinchey 57'; Wotton 82'	(Report)	Howard 67'	Attendance: 10,973; Referee: T Parkes

24 August 2002	Cheltenham Town	1–2	Plymouth Argyle	Whaddon Road, Cheltenham
	Spencer 33'	(Report)	Coughlan 61'; Wotton 74'	Attendance: 4,713; Referee: K Hill

26 August 2002	Plymouth Argyle	2–0	Bristol City	Home Park, Plymouth
	Wotton 65' (pen.); Coughlan 81'	(Report)		Attendance: 11,922; Referee: W Jordan

31 August 2002	Queens Park Rangers	2–2	Plymouth Argyle	Loftus Road, London
	Thomas 69'; Pacquette 90'	(Report)	Friio 33'; Hodges 59'	Attendance: 14,001; Referee: L Cable

14 September 2002	Barnsley	1–1	Plymouth Argyle	Oakwell, Barnsley
	Dyer 10'	(Report)	Sturrock 38'	Attendance: 9,134; Referee: M Fletcher

17 September 2002	Peterborough United	2–0	Plymouth Argyle	London Road, Peterborough
	Clarke 58'; Green 84'	(Report)		Attendance: 4,208; Referee: M Warren

21 September 2002	Plymouth Argyle	0–1	Chesterfield	Home Park, Plymouth
		(Report)	Ebdon 69'	Attendance: 8,547; Referee: S Tomlin

24 September 2002	Plymouth Argyle	2–2	Cardiff City	Home Park, Plymouth
	Wotton 8'; Coughlan 90'	(Report)	Earnshaw 2' 67'	Attendance: 11,606; Referee: C Wilkes

28 September 2002	Wycombe Wanderers	2-1	Plymouth Argyle	Adams Park, Wycombe
	Currie 28' (pen.), 68'	(Report)	Friio 60'	Attendance: 6,708; Referee: P Danson

5 October 2002	Plymouth Argyle	0–0	Northampton Town	Home Park, Plymouth
		(Report)		Attendance: 8,530; Referee: A Bates

12 October 2002	Plymouth Argyle	1–3	Wigan Athletic	Home Park, Plymouth
	Stonebridge 18'	(Report)	Dinning 25' 58'; Ellington 90'	Attendance: 8,746; Referee: P Armstrong

19 October 2002	Crewe Alexandra	0–1	Plymouth Argyle	Alexandra Stadium, Crewe
	Norris 45'	(Report)		Attendance: 6,733; Referee: F Stretton

26 October 2002	Plymouth Argyle	1–3	Blackpool	Home Park, Plymouth
	Keith 60'	(Report)	Taylor 16' 40'; Murphy 87'	Attendance: 8,717; Referee: A Penn

2 November 2002	Tranmere Rovers	2–1	Plymouth Argyle	Prenton Park, Tranmere
	Roberts 87'; Hodges (og) 90'	(Report)	Adams 6'	Attendance: 7,083; Referee: S Dunn

12 November 2002	Plymouth Argyle	2–2	Oldham Athletic	Home Park, Plymouth
	Stonebridge 4'; Friio 7'	(Report)	Eyres 74' (pen.); Andrews 76'	Attendance: 8,216; Referee: P Crossley

23 November 2002	Plymouth Argyle	4–1	Stockport County	Home Park, Plymouth
	Goodwin (og) 6' (og) 60'; Keith 13'; Adams 42'	(Report)	Wotton (og) 11'	Attendance: 7,746; Referee: M Warren

30 November 2002	Colchester United	0–0	Plymouth Argyle	Layer Road, Colchester
		(Report)		Attendance: 3,714; Referee: C Boyeson

14 December 2002	Plymouth Argyle	1–1	Swindon Town	Home Park, Plymouth
	Hodges 90' (pen.)	(Report)	Andy Gurney 77'	Attendance: 8,111; Referee: R Olivier

21 December 2002	Port Vale	1–2	Plymouth Argyle	Vale Park, Stoke-on-Trent
	Brooker 26'	(Report)	Evans 2'; Keith 40'	Attendance: 4,892; Referee: P Prosser

26 December 2002	Bristol City	0–0	Plymouth Argyle	Ashton Gate Stadium, Bristol
		(Report)		Attendance: 18,085; Referee: A Hall

28 December 2002	Plymouth Argyle	1–0	Notts County	Home Park, Plymouth
	Aljofree 61'	(Report)		Attendance: 11,901; Referee: J Ross

1 January 2003	Plymouth Argyle	3–1	Cheltenham Town	Home Park, Plymouth
	Phillips 22'; Stonebridge 35'; Norris 53'	(Report)	Worrell (og) 13'	Attendance: 10,927; Referee: M Cooper

18 January 2003	Plymouth Argyle	0–1	Queens Park Rangers	Home Park, Plymouth
		(Report)	Pacquette 51'	Attendance: 10,249; Referee: P Walton

25 January 2003	Notts County	0–2	Plymouth Argyle	Meadow Lane, Nottingham
		(Report)	Norris 38' 50'	Attendance: 6,329; Referee: A D'Urso

1 February 2003	Plymouth Argyle	3–1	Mansfield Town	Home Park, Plymouth
	Lawrence (og) 2'; Phillips 68'; Evans 84'	(Report)	Lawrence 11'	Attendance: 8,030; Referee: S Tomlin

4 February 2003	Huddersfield Town	1–0	Plymouth Argyle	McAlpine Stadium, Huddersfield
	Smith 82' (pen.)	(Report)		Attendance: 7,294; Referee: E Ilderton

8 February 2003	Oldham Athletic	0–1	Plymouth Argyle	Boundary Park, Oldham
		(Report)	Evans 39'	Attendance: 6,657; Referee: H Webb

15 February 2003	Plymouth Argyle	0–1	Tranmere Rovers	Home Park, Plymouth
		(Report)	Haworth 57'	Attendance: 8,590; Referee: D Crick

21 February 2003	Cardiff City	1–1	Plymouth Argyle	Ninian Park, Cardiff
	Earnshaw 42'	(Report)	Wotton 86'	Attendance: 14,006; Referee: M Warren

25 February 2003	Luton Town	1–0	Plymouth Argyle	Kenilworth Road, Luton
	Thorpe 50'	(Report)		Attendance: 7,589; Referee: T Bates

1 March 2003	Plymouth Argyle	1–1	Barnsley	Home Park, Plymouth
	Coughlan 14'	(Report)	Dyer 66'	Attendance: 8,228; Referee: P Rejer

4 March 2003	Plymouth Argyle	6–1	Peterborough United	Home Park, Plymouth
	Keith 9'; Burton (og) 25'; Gill (og) 42'; Wotton 45'; Friio 62'; Bent 72'	(Report)	McKenzie 70'	Attendance: 6,931; Referee: C Penton

8 March 2003	Chesterfield	3–2	Plymouth Argyle	Saltergate, Chesterfield
	Payne 10'; Reeves 17' 49'	(Report)	Keith 15' 74'	Attendance: 3,668; Referee: F Stretton

15 March 2003	Blackpool	1–1	Plymouth Argyle	Bloomfield Road, Blackpool
	Taylor 40'	(Report)	Keith 29'	Attendance: 8,772; Referee: C Wilkes

18 March 2003	Plymouth Argyle	1–3	Crewe Alexandra	Home Park, Plymouth
	Stonebridge 47'	(Report)	Jack 4'; Ashton 13' 68'	Attendance: 7,777; Referee: L Cable

22 March 2003	Plymouth Argyle	3–0	Brentford	Home Park, Plymouth
	Keith 12' 48'; Smith 28'	(Report)		Attendance: 6,835; Referee: M Fletcher

29 March 2003	Wigan Athletic	0–1	Plymouth Argyle	JJB Stadium, Wigan
		(Report)	Keith 35'	Attendance: 7,203; Referee: M Cooper

5 April 2003	Plymouth Argyle	0–0	Colchester United	Home Park, Plymouth
		(Report)		Attendance: 7,122; Referee: P Taylor

12 April 2003	Stockport County	2–1	Plymouth Argyle	Edgeley Park, Stockport
	Wilbraham 40'; Daly 86' (pen.)	(Report)	Keith 72'	Attendance: 5,484; Referee: M Ryan

19 April 2003	Plymouth Argyle	3–0	Port Vale	Home Park, Plymouth
	Coughlan 56'; Norris 67'; Wotton 77'	(Report)		Attendance: 7,778; Referee: M Warren

23 April 2003	Swindon Town	2–0	Plymouth Argyle	County Ground, Swindon
	Invincible 38'; Parkin 68'	(Report)		Attendance: 5,057; Referee: M Williamson

26 April 2003	Northampton Town	2–2	Plymouth Argyle	Sixfields, Northampton
	Stamp 66'; Morison 72'	(Report)	Norris 19'; Stonebridge 55'	Attendance: 5,063; Referee: E Evans

3 May 2003	Plymouth Argyle	1–0	Wycombe Wanderers	Home Park, Plymouth
	Lowndes 75'	(Report)		Attendance: 10,129; Referee: G Cain

=== League table ===
Pos	Club	Pld	W	D	L	GF	GA	GD	Pts
7	Tranmere Rovers	46	23	11	12	66	57	+9	80
8	Plymouth Argyle	46	17	14	15	63	52	+11	65
9	Luton Town	46	17	14	15	67	62	+5	65

Pld = Matches played; W = Matches won; D = Matches drawn; L = Matches lost; GF = Goals for; GA = Goals against; GD = Goal difference; Pts = Points

=== FA Cup ===
First Round

16 November 2002	Bury	0–3	Plymouth Argyle	Gigg Lane, Bury
		(Report)	Evans 19'; Nelson (og) 32'; Wotton 86'	Attendance: 2,987; Referee: H Webb

Second Round

7 December 2002	Stockport County	0–3	Plymouth Argyle	Edgeley Park, Stockport
		(Report)	Stonebridge 9'; Friio 14'; Wotton 72' (pen.)	Attendance: 3,571; Referee: A Butler

Third Round

4 January 2003	Plymouth Argyle	2–2	Dagenham & Redbridge	Home Park, Plymouth
	Stonebridge 44'; Wotton 61'	(Report)	Terry 13'; McDougald 67'	Attendance: 11,885; Referee: T Parkes

Third Round Replay

14 January 2003	Dagenham & Redbridge	2–0	Plymouth Argyle	Victoria Road, Dagenham
	Shipp 20'; McDougald 85'	(Report)		Attendance: 4,530; Referee: T Parkes

=== Football League Cup ===
First Round

10 September 2002	Crystal Palace	2–1 (a.e.t.)	Plymouth Argyle	Selhurst Park, London
	Powell 22'; Johnson 113'	(Report)	Sturrock 39'	Attendance: 6,385; Referee: C Penton

=== Football League Trophy ===
Southern Section First Round

22 October 2002	Chester City	1–2	Plymouth Argyle	Deva Stadium, Chester
	Guyett 29'	(Report)	Keith 34'; Evans 85'	Attendance: 1,126; Referee: G Salisbury

Southern Section Second Round

12 November 2002	Plymouth Argyle	0–1	Brentford	Home Park, Plymouth
		(Report)	Hunt 89'	Attendance: 3,565; Referee: L Cable

== Players ==
=== First-team squad ===
Squad at end of season

Note: Flags indicate national team as defined under FIFA eligibility rules; some limited exceptions apply. Players may hold more than one non-FIFA nationality.

No.	Pos.	Nation	Player
1	GK	FRA	Romain Larrieu
2	DF	IRL	David Worrell
3	DF	NIR	Brian McGlinchey
4	MF	FRA	David Friio
5	DF	IRL	Graham Coughlan
6	DF	ENG	Craig Taylor
7	MF	ENG	David Beresford
8	FW	ENG	Nathan Lowndes
9	FW	IRL	Mickey Evans (Note: Evans was born in Plymouth, England, but also qualified to represent the Republic of Ireland internationally and made his international debut for the Republic of Ireland in October 1997.)
10	FW	ENG	Ian Stonebridge
11	MF	ENG	Martin Phillips
12	MF	ENG	Steve Adams
13	DF	SCO	Kieran McAnespie] (Note: McAnespie was born in Gosport, England, but also qualified to represent Scotland internationally and represented Scotland at U-21 level.)
14	MF	ENG	Lee Hodges
15	DF	ENG	Paul Wotton
16	MF	FRA	Osvaldo Lopes

No.	Pos.	Nation	Player
17	FW	ENG	Stewart Yetton
18	DF	ENG	Hasney Aljofree
19	FW	SCO	Marino Keith
20	MF	CAN	Jason Bent
21	FW	SCO	Blair Sturrock
22	MF	ENG	Joe Broad
23	GK	ENG	Luke McCormick
24	DF	ENG	Stuart Malcolm
26	MF	ENG	David Norris
27	DF	NIR	Tony Capaldi (Note: Capaldi was born in [[Porsgrunn (town)|]], Norway, but also qualified to represent Scotland and Northern Ireland internationally through his father and grandmother respectively and represented Northern Ireland at U-18 and U-21 level before making his international debut for Northern Ireland in March 2004.) (on loan from Birmingham City)
29	MF	SCO	Paul Bernard
30	DF	ENG	Paul Connolly
31	MF	ENG	Marcus Martin
32	GK	ENG	Jason Chapman
33	GK	ENG	Kenny Schofield

=== Left club during season ===
Note: Flags indicate national team as defined under FIFA eligibility rules; some limited exceptions apply. Players may hold more than one non-FIFA nationality.

No.	Pos.	Nation	Player
16	FW	SCO	Martin Gritton (to Torquay United)
17	MF	ENG	Kevin Wills (to Torquay United)
17	MF	SCO	Grant Smith (on loan from Sheffield United)

No.	Pos.	Nation	Player
25	MF	ENG	Neil Heaney (retired)
27	DF	ENG	Tony Barras (on loan from Walsall)
29	GK	AUS	Danny Milosevic (on loan to Leeds United)

== Statistics ==
=== Appearances and goals ===
Key

† Permanent player left club during the season.
‡ On loan at Plymouth Argyle from another club during season.
¤ On loan to another club from Plymouth Argyle during season.
* First appearance(s) for Plymouth Argyle.

# = Squad number; Pos = Playing position; P = Number of games played; G = Number of goals scored; = Yellow cards; = Red cards; GK = Goalkeeper; DF = Defender; MF = Midfielder; FW = Forward

Statistics do not include minor competitions or games played for other clubs. All players who were provided a squad number during the 2002–03 season are included.

#	Pos	Name	P	G	P	G	P	G	P	G	A yellow card	A red card	Notes
#	Pos	Name	League		FA Cup		League Cup		Total		Discipline		
1	GK	Romain Larrieu	43	0	4	0	1	0	48	0	0	0	
2	DF	David Worrell	43	0	4	0	1	0	48	0	4	0	
3	DF	Brian McGlinchey	19	1	2	0	0	0	21	1	4	1	
4	MF	David Friio	36	6	4	1	1	0	41	7	8	0	
5	DF	Graham Coughlan	42	5	4	0	1	0	47	5	3	0	
6	DF	Craig Taylor†	1	0	0	0	0	0	1	0	0	0	
7	MF	David Beresford	15	0	0	0	0	0	15*	0	0	0	
8	FW	Nathan Lowndes	16	2	0	0	1	0	17*	2	4	0	
9	FW	Mickey Evans	42	4	4	1	1	0	47	5	3	0	
10	FW	Ian Stonebridge	37	5	4	2	1	0	42	7	1	0	
11	MF	Martin Phillips	24	2	2	0	1	0	27	2	3	0	
12	MF	Steve Adams	37	2	4	0	1	0	42	2	2	0	
13	MF	Kieran McAnespie	4	0	0	0	0	0	4*	0	0	0	
14	MF	Lee Hodges	39	2	3	0	1	0	43	2	0	0	
15	DF	Paul Wotton	43	8	4	3	1	0	48	11	6	0	
16	MF	Osvaldo Lopes†	9	0	1	0	1	0	11*	0	0	0	
17	MF	Grant Smith‡	5	1	0	0	0	0	5*	1	1	0	
17	FW	Stewart Yetton	1	0	0	0	0	0	1	0	0	0	
18	DF	Hasney Aljofree	19	1	1	0	1	0	21	1	3	0	
19	FW	Marino Keith	37	11	4	0	0	0	41	11	2	0	
20	MF	Jason Bent	25	1	2	0	0	0	27	1	2	1	
21	FW	Blair Sturrock	20	1	3	0	1	1	24	2	0	0	
22	MF	Joe Broad	5	0	0	0	0	0	5	0	0	0	
23	GK	Luke McCormick	3	0	0	0	0	0	3	0	0	0	
24	DF	Stuart Malcolm	3	0	0	0	0	0	3*	0	0	0	
25	MF	Neil Heaney†	0	0	0	0	0	0	0	0	0	0	
26	MF	David Norris‡	33	6	3	0	0	0	36*	6	4	0	
27	DF	Tony Barras‡	4	0	0	0	0	0	4*	0	0	0	
27	MF	Tony Capaldi	1	0	0	0	0	0	1*	0	0	0	
29	MF	Paul Bernard	10	0	0	0	0	0	10*	0	1	0	
29	GK	Danny Milosevic‡	1	0	0	0	0	0	1*	0	0	0	
30	DF	Paul Connolly	2	0	0	0	0	0	2	0	0	0	
33	GK	Danny Williams‡	0	0	0	0	0	0	0	0	0	0	

=== Transfers ===
In

Date	Player	From	Fee
8 July 2002	(England) David Beresford	Hull City	Free
8 July 2002	(England) Nathan Lowndes	Livingston	Undisclosed
13 August 2002	(Scotland) Stuart Malcolm	St Johnstone	Free
30 August 2002	(England) Hasney Aljofree	Dundee United	Free
14 December 2002	(England) David Norris	Bolton Wanderers	£25,000
23 December 2002	(Scotland) Paul Bernard	Barnsley	Free
27 March 2003	(Scotland) Kieran McAnespie	Fulham	Free
30 April 2003	(Northern Ireland) Tony Capaldi	Birmingham City	Free

Out

Date	Player	To	Fee
6 September 2002	(Scotland) Martin Gritton	Torquay United	Free
9 September 2002	(England) Sean Evers	Woking	Free
18 December 2002	(England) Neil Heaney	Free agent	Released
1 January 2003	(England) Kevin Wills	Torquay United	Free
2 June 2003	(France) Osvaldo Lopes	Free agent	Released
13 June 2003	(England) Craig Taylor	Torquay United	Free

=== Loans ===
In

Start date	Player	To	End date
9 October 2002	(England) David Norris	Bolton Wanderers	13 December 2002
6 November 2002	(Australia) Danny Milosevic	Leeds United	10 November 2002
20 November 2002	(England) Tony Barras	Walsall	1 January 2003
11 March 2003	(Scotland) Grant Smith	Sheffield United	4 May 2003

Out In

Start date	Player	From	End date
5 August 2002	(Scotland) Martin Gritton	Torquay United	5 September 2002
29 November 2002	(England) Kevin Wills	Torquay United	29 December 2002
24 February 2003	(England) Craig Taylor	Torquay United	4 May 2003
