= 2001–02 Plymouth Argyle F.C. season =

English football club season

Plymouth Argyle F.C.
2001–02 season
- Chairman: Paul Stapleton
- Manager: Paul Sturrock
- Stadium: Home Park
- Third Division: 1st
- FA Cup: Second round
- League Cup: First round
- League Trophy: First round
- Top goalscorer: League: Graham Coughlan (11); All: Graham Coughlan/David Friio (11)
- Highest home attendance: 18,517 (vs Cheltenham Town, 20 April)
- Lowest home attendance: 3,850 (vs Swansea City, 11 September)
Home colours

The 2001–02 season was the 107th season in the history of Plymouth Argyle Football Club, their 77th in the Football League, and 5th in the fourth tier of the English football league system. Their 12th-place finish in the 2000–01 season meant it was their fourth successive season playing in the Third Division.

== Season summary ==
The club began the 2001–02 season in the Football League Third Division, following a disappointing 12th-place finish the previous year. There were signs of change at the club and they finished the season as champions, breaking numerous club records in the process, including a record haul of 102 points. They achieved 31 wins, 9 draws, and 6 defeats, from 46 games. Their leading goalscorer was Graham Coughlan with 11 goals in all competitions – an outstanding achievement for a centre-back. The club reached the second round of the FA Cup, drawing 1–1 at home with Bristol Rovers before losing the replay 3–2. They entered the League Cup in the first round and were eliminated away to Watford 1–0. They also competed in the Football League Trophy, where they bowed out in the first round after a 2–1 defeat away to Cheltenham Town. Notable players to begin their careers with the Pilgrims this season included Coughlan, Marino Keith, and Jason Bent.

Legend Win Draw Loss

=== Football League ===
11 August 2001	Plymouth Argyle	0–1	Shrewsbury Town	Home Park, Plymouth
		Report	Jemson 73'	Attendance: 5,087; Referee: C Penton

18 August 2001	Hull City	0–0	Plymouth Argyle	Boothferry Park, Hull
		Report		Attendance: 10,755; Referee: G Cain

25 August 2001	Plymouth Argyle	1–2	Rochdale	Home Park, Plymouth
	Coleman (og) 16'	Report	Jones 17'; Connor 77'	Attendance: 4,198; Referee: R Harris

27 August 2001	Rushden & Diamonds	2–3	Plymouth Argyle	Nene Park, Irthlingborough
	Darby 30', 42'	Report	Evans 45'; Coughlan 51'; McGlinchey 71'	Attendance: 4,414; Referee: G Hegley

8 September 2001	Torquay United	0–1	Plymouth Argyle	Plainmoor, Torquay
		Report	Friio 58'	Attendance: 4,217; Referee: M Brandwood

11 September 2001	Plymouth Argyle	3–1	Swansea City	Home Park, Plymouth
	Wotton (pen) 24'; Banger 45'; Phillips 61'	Report	Sidibé 79'	Attendance: 3,850; Referee: P Prosser

15 September 2001	Kidderminster Harriers	0–0	Plymouth Argyle	Aggborough, Kidderminster
		Report		Attendance: 2,801; Referee: S Baines

18 September 2001	Exeter City	2–3	Plymouth Argyle	St James Park, Exeter
	Curran 7'; Roberts 18'	Report	Phillips 6'; Evans 65'; Stonebridge 90'	Attendance: 5,756; Referee: D Gallagher

22 September 2001	Plymouth Argyle	2–0	Macclesfield Town	Home Park, Plymouth
	Hodges 45'; Friio 65'	Report		Attendance: 4,227; Referee: J Ross

25 September 2001	York City	0–0	Plymouth Argyle	Bootham Crescent, York
		Report		Attendance: 2,282; Referee: M Cowburn

29 September 2001	Plymouth Argyle	2–1	Luton Town	Home Park, Plymouth
	Phillips 22'; Friio 45' Evans (red card) 38'	Report	Crowe 15'	Attendance: 5,782; Referee: A Hall

6 October 2001	Oxford United	1–1	Plymouth Argyle	Kassam Stadium, Oxford
	Moody (pen) 74'	Report	Nicky Banger 80'	Attendance: 6,017; Referee: P Alcock

13 October 2001	Plymouth Argyle	3–0	Halifax Town	Home Park, Plymouth
	Coughlan 16'; Phillips 23'; Hodges 26'	Report		Attendance: 5,065; Referee: M Warren

20 October 2001	Mansfield Town	0–3	Plymouth Argyle	Field Mill, Mansfield
		Report	Evans 54'; Friio 90'; Stonebridge 90'	Attendance: 4,621; Referee: G Frankland

23 October 2001	Plymouth Argyle	2–0	Lincoln City	Home Park, Plymouth
	Friio 28'; Coughlan 75'	Report		Attendance: 6,572; Referee: M Fletcher

28 October 2001	Bristol Rovers	1–2	Plymouth Argyle	Memorial Ground, Bristol
	Cameron 85'	Report	Phillips 2'; Hodges 58'	Attendance: 6,889; Referee: M Halsey

3 November 2001	Plymouth Argyle	1–0	Hartlepool United	Home Park, Plymouth
	Friio 41'	Report		Attendance: 5,723; Referee: B Jordan

9 November 2001	Cheltenham Town	0–0	Plymouth Argyle	Whaddon Road, Cheltenham
		Report		Attendance: 5,035; Referee: B Curson

20 November 2001	Southend United	0–1	Plymouth Argyle	Roots Hall, Southend
		Report	Adams 43'	Attendance: 3,716; Referee: P Taylor

24 November 2001	Plymouth Argyle	3–0	Carlisle United	Home Park, Plymouth
	Evans 17'; Bent 45'; Phillips 88'	Report		Attendance: 5,870; Referee: R Harris

1 December 2001	Leyton Orient	0–0	Plymouth Argyle	Brisbane Road, Leyton
		Report		Attendance: 6,342; Referee: S Dunn

15 December 2001	Plymouth Argyle	1–0	Darlington	Home Park, Plymouth
	Friio 81'	Report		Attendance: 5,041; Referee: M Cooper

22 December 2001	Scunthorpe United	2–1	Plymouth Argyle	Glanford Park, Scunthorpe
	Hodges 6', 25'	Report	Coughlan 51'	Attendance: 3,602; Referee: G Laws

26 December 2001	Plymouth Argyle	2–2	Torquay United	Home Park, Plymouth
	Coughlan 50'; Stonebridge 52'	Report	McGlinchey (og) 67'; Logan (pen) 90'	Attendance: 13,677; Referee: P Rejer

29 December 2001	Plymouth Argyle	1–0	Rushden & Diamonds	Home Park, Plymouth
	Keith 81'	Report		Attendance: 9,503; Referee: L Cable

12 January 2002	Plymouth Argyle	1–0	Hull City	Home Park, Plymouth
	Stonebridge 20'	Report		Attendance: 9,134; Referee: C Wilkes

19 January 2002	Shrewsbury Town	3–1	Plymouth Argyle	Gay Meadow, Shrewsbury
	Rodgers 44'; Aiston 50'; Lowe 84'; Rioch (red card) 17'	Report	Evans 5'	Attendance: 4,796; Referee: D Pugh

22 January 2002	Plymouth Argyle	2–1	Scunthorpe United	Home Park, Plymouth
	Wotton (pen) 44'; Keith 54'	Report	Carruthers 13'	Attendance: 5,804; Referee: M Fletcher

26 January 2002	Plymouth Argyle	4–2	Oxford United	Home Park, Plymouth
	Coughlan 21'; Hodges 24'; Stonebridge 45', 46'	Report	Morley 34'; Powell 41'	Attendance: 8,239; Referee: B Curson

2 February 2002	Luton Town	2–0	Plymouth Argyle	Kenilworth Road, Luton
	Nicholls (pen) 80'; Howard 87'	Report		Attendance: 9,585; Referee: P Joslin

5 February 2002	Swansea City	0–1	Plymouth Argyle	Vetch Field, Swansea
		Report	Sturrock 39'	Attendance: 4,060; Referee: S Tomlin

9 February 2002	Plymouth Argyle	1–0	Mansfield Town	Home Park, Plymouth
	Friio 85'	Report		Attendance: 14,716; Referee: D Crick

16 February 2002	Halifax Town	0–2	Plymouth Argyle	The Shay, Halifax
		Report	Hodges 41' Wotton (pen) 43'	Attendance: 2,330; Referee: T Parkes

23 February 2002	Plymouth Argyle	2–1	Kidderminster Harriers	Home Park, Plymouth
	Coughlan 67'; Wotton (pen) 81'	Report	Broughton 33'	Attendance: 8,758; Referee: R Beeby

26 February 2002	Plymouth Argyle	3–0	Exeter City	Home Park, Plymouth
	Adams 6'; Keith 29', 74'	Report	McCarthy (red card) 76'	Attendance: 16,369; Referee: G Cain

2 March 2002	Macclesfield Town	1–1	Plymouth Argyle	Moss Rose, Macclesfield
	Priest 90'	Report	Coughlan 71'	Attendance: 2,557; Referee: P Dowd

5 March 2002	Plymouth Argyle	1–0	York City	Home Park, Plymouth
	Potter (og) 45'; Worrell (red card) 53'	Report		Attendance: 10,801; Referee: P Prosser

16 March 2002	Plymouth Argyle	3–0	Leyton Orient	Home Park, Plymouth
	Stonebridge 6'; Coughlan 78'; Evans 81'	Report		Attendance: 9,438; Referee: M Fletcher

23 March 2002	Lincoln City	0–1	Plymouth Argyle	Sincil Bank, Lincoln
		Report	Stonebridge 71'	Attendance: 4,019; Referee: Trevor Parkes

26 March 2002	Rochdale	1–3	Plymouth Argyle	Spotland, Rochdale
	Simpson 54'	Report	Keith 66'; Coughlan 81'; Hodges 83'	Attendance: 4,457; Referee: Mike Pike

30 March 2002	Plymouth Argyle	1–0	Bristol Rovers	Home Park, Plymouth
	Keith 1'	Report		Attendance: 15,732; Referee: Paul Danson

1 April 2002	Hartlepool United	1–0	Plymouth Argyle	Victoria Park, Hartlepool
	Clarke 86'	Report		Attendance: 3,725; Referee: Mike Jones

6 April 2002	Plymouth Argyle	0–0	Southend United	Home Park, Plymouth
		Report		Attendance: 10,021; Referee: Ray Olivier

13 April 2002	Carlisle United	0–2	Plymouth Argyle	Brunton Park, Carlisle
		Report	Keith 20' Wotton 53'	Attendance: 3,080; Referee: Mark Cowburn

15 April 2002	Darlington	1–4	Plymouth Argyle	Feethams, Darlington
	Clark (pen) 34'	Report	Evans 10'; Keith 17', 27'; Bent 59'	Attendance: 4,089; Referee: Guy Stretton

20 April 2002	Plymouth Argyle	2–0	Cheltenham Town	Home Park, Plymouth
	Bent 4'; Coughlan 24'	Report		Attendance: 18,517; Referee: Steve Tomlin

==== League table ====
Pos	Club	Pld	W	D	L	GF	GA	GD	Pts
1	Plymouth Argyle	46	31	9	6	71	28	+43	102
2	Luton Town	46	30	7	9	96	48	+48	97
3	Mansfield Town	46	24	7	15	72	60	+12	79
4	Cheltenham Town	46	21	15	10	66	49	+17	78
5	Rochdale	46	21	15	10	65	52	+13	78

Pld = Matches played; W = Matches won; D = Matches drawn; L = Matches lost; GF = Goals for; GA = Goals against; GD = Goal difference; Pts = Points

==== Results summary ====
Overall								Home						Away					
Pld	W	D	L	GF	GA	GD	Pts	W	D	L	GF	GA	GD	W	D	L	GF	GA	GD
46	31	9	6	71	28	+43	102	19	2	2	41	11	+30	12	7	4	30	17	+13

=== FA Cup ===
First Round

17 November 2001	Whitby Town	1–1	Plymouth Argyle	Turnbull Ground, Whitby
	Gildea 42'	(Report)	Phillips 72'	Attendance: 2,202; Referee: Neale Barry

First round replay

27 November 2001	Plymouth Argyle	3–2	Whitby Town	Home Park, Plymouth
	Bent 16'; Stonebridge 39'; Phillips 44'; Evans (red card) 36'	(Report)	Burt 70'; Robinson 72'	Attendance: 5,914; Referee: Paul Durkin

Second Round

8 December 2001	Plymouth Argyle	1–1	Bristol Rovers	Home Park, Plymouth
	Wotton 27'	(Report)	Walters 60'	Attendance: 6,141; Referee: Richard Beeby

Second Round Replay

18 December 2001	Bristol Rovers	3–2	Plymouth Argyle	Memorial Ground, Bristol
	Ommel 56'; Hogg 71'; Ellington 87'	(Report)	Friio 76', 86'	Attendance: 5,763; Referee: Richard Beeby

=== Football League Cup ===
First Round

21 August 2001	Watford	1–0	Plymouth Argyle	Vicarage Road, Watford
	Gayle 82'	(Report)		Attendance: 9,230; Referee: Paul Armstrong

=== Football League Trophy ===
Southern Section First Round

16 October 2001	Cheltenham Town	2–1	Plymouth Argyle	Whaddon Road, Cheltenham
	Victory 53'; Alsop 63'	(Report)	Friio 16'	Attendance: 1,310; Referee: Paul Rejer

== Players ==
=== First-team squad ===
Squad at end of season

Note: Flags indicate national team as defined under FIFA eligibility rules; some limited exceptions apply. Players may hold more than one non-FIFA nationality.

No.	Pos.	Nation	Player
1	GK	FRA	Romain Larrieu
2	DF	IRL	David Worrell
3	DF	ENG	Jon Beswetherick
4	MF	FRA	David Friio
5	DF	IRL	Graham Coughlan
6	DF	ENG	Craig Taylor
7	DF	NIR	Brian McGlinchey
9	FW	IRL	Mickey Evans (Note: Evans was born in Plymouth, England, but also qualified to represent the Republic of Ireland internationally and made his international debut for the Republic of Ireland in October 1997.)
10	FW	ENG	Ian Stonebridge
11	MF	ENG	Martin Phillips
12	MF	ENG	Steve Adams
14	MF	ENG	Lee Hodges

No.	Pos.	Nation	Player
15	DF	ENG	Paul Wotton
16	FW	SCO	Martin Gritton
17	MF	ENG	Kevin Wills
19	FW	SCO	Marino Keith
20	MF	CAN	Jason Bent
21	FW	SCO	Blair Sturrock
22	MF	ENG	Joe Broad
23	GK	ENG	Luke McCormick
24	DF	ENG	Paul Connolly
25	MF	ENG	Neil Heaney
28	MF	CGO	Marly Malonga

=== Left club during season ===
Note: Flags indicate national team as defined under FIFA eligibility rules; some limited exceptions apply. Players may hold more than one non-FIFA nationality.

No.	Pos.	Nation	Player
8	MF	ENG	Sean Evers (on loan to Stevenage Borough)
18	FW	ENG	Nicky Banger (released)
19	FW	ENG	Dean Crowe (on loan from Stoke City)

No.	Pos.	Nation	Player
21	FW	ENG	Steve Guinan (to Shrewsbury Town)
26	GK	ENG	Chris Adamson (on loan from West Bromwich Albion)

== Statistics ==
=== Appearances and goals ===
Key

* First appearance(s) for Plymouth Argyle.
¤ On loan to another club from Plymouth Argyle during season.
‡ On loan at Plymouth Argyle from another club during season.
† Permanent player left club during the season.

# = Squad number; Pos = Playing position; P = Number of games played; G = Number of goals scored; = Yellow cards; = Red cards; GK = Goalkeeper; DF = Defender; MF = Midfielder; FW = Forward

Statistics do not include minor competitions or games played for other clubs. All players are listed by position and then surname.

No.	Pos.	Name	League		FA Cup		League Cup		Total		Discipline		Notes
No.	Pos.	Name	Apps	Goals	Apps	Goals	Apps	Goals	Apps	Goals	Yellow card	Red card	
-	GK	(England) Chris Adamson ‡	1	0	0	0	0	0	1*	0			
-	GK	(France) Romain Larrieu	45	0	4	0	1	0	50	0			
-	GK	(England) Luke McCormick	0	0	0	0	0	0	0	0			
-	DF	(England) Jon Beswetherick †	32	0	3	0	0	0	35	0			
-	DF	(England) Paul Connolly ¤	0	0	0	0	0	0	0	0			
-	DF	(Republic of Ireland) Graham Coughlan	46	11	4	0	1	0	51*	11			
-	DF	(Northern Ireland) Brian McGlinchey	29	1	3	0	1	0	33	1			
-	DF	(England) Craig Taylor	1	0	0	0	0	0	1	0			
-	DF	(Republic of Ireland) David Worrell	42	0	4	0	0	0	46	0			
-	DF	(England) Paul Wotton	46	5	4	0	0	0	50	5			
-	MF	(England) Steve Adams	46	2	4	0	1	0	51	2			
-	MF	(Canada) Jason Bent	21	3	3	1	0	0	24*	4			
-	MF	(England) Joe Broad ¤	7	0	0	0	1	0	8*	0			
-	MF	(England) Sean Evers ¤	7	0	1	0	1	0	9	0			
-	MF	(France) David Friio	41	8	4	2	1	0	46	10			
-	MF	(England) Neil Heaney	8	0	0	0	0	0	8*	0			
-	MF	(England) Lee Hodges	45	6	4	0	1	0	50	6			
-	MF	(England) Martin Phillips	39	6	4	2	1	0	44	8			
-	MF	(England) Kevin Wills	18	0	2	0	1	0	21	0			
-	FW	(England) Nicky Banger †	10	2	0	0	0	0	10*	2			
-	FW	(England) Dean Crowe ‡	1	0	0	0	0	0	1*	0			
-	FW	(Republic of Ireland) Mickey Evans	38	7	3	0	1	0	42	7			
-	FW	(Scotland) Martin Gritton ¤	2	0	0	0	0	0	2	0			
-	FW	(England) Martin Green¤	2	1	0	0	0	0	0	0			
-	FW	(Scotland) Marino Keith	23	9	2	0	0	0	25*	9			
-	FW	(England) Ian Stonebridge	42	8	4	1	1	0	47	9			

=== Goalscorers ===
Scorer	Goals
(Republic of Ireland) Graham Coughlan	11
(France) David Friio	11
(Scotland) Marino Keith	9
(England) Ian Stonebridge	9
(England) Martin Phillips	8
(Republic of Ireland) Mickey Evans	7
(England) Lee Hodges	6
(England) Paul Wotton	6
(Canada) Jason Bent	4
(England) Steve Adams	2
(England) Nicky Banger	2
(Northern Ireland) Brian McGlinchey	1

=== Awards ===
2001–02 Awards	Pos.	Player
Player of the Year	DF	(Republic of Ireland) Graham Coughlan
Young Player of the Year	MF	(England) Steve Adams

== Transfers ==
=== Permanent ===
In

Date	Pos.	Player	From	Fee
24 August 2001	FW	(England) Nicky Banger	Dundee	Free
21 September 2001	MF	(Canada) Jason Bent	Colorado Rapids	Free
6 November 2001	FW	(Scotland) Marino Keith	Livingston	Free
1 December 2001	FW	(Scotland) Blair Sturrock	Dundee United	Free
4 December 2001	MF	(England) Neil Heaney	Dundee United	Undisclosed

Out

Date	Pos.	Player	To	Fee
3 July 2001	FW	(Wales) Sean McCarthy	Exeter City	Free
8 July 2001	MF	(England) Martin Barlow	Exeter City	Free
10 July 2001	GK	(England) Jon Sheffield	Yeovil Town	Free
1 August 2001	MF	(Wales) Michael Meaker	Northwich Victoria	Undisclosed
6 August 2001	DF	(England) Michael Heathcote	Shrewsbury Town	Free
17 August 2001	MF	(England) Stuart Elliott	Carlisle United	Free
26 November 2001	FW	(England) Nicky Banger	Free agent	Released
28 March 2002	FW	(England) Steve Guinan	Shrewsbury Town	Free
29 May 2002	DF	(England) Jon Beswetherick	Sheffield Wednesday	Free

=== Loans ===
In

Start date	Pos.	Player	To	End date
10 August 2001	FW	(England) Dean Crowe	Stoke City	5 September 2001
10 January 2002	GK	(England) Chris Adamson	West Bromwich Albion	7 February 2002

Out

Start date	Pos.	Player	From	End date
24 November 2001	MF	(England) Joe Broad	Yeovil Town	24 December 2001
29 November 2001	FW	(Scotland) Martin Gritton	Shelbourne	31 May 2002
1 February 2002	DF	(England) Paul Connolly	Bideford	31 May 2002
28 March 2002	MF	(England) Sean Evers	Stevenage Borough	31 May 2002
