= 2004–05 Plymouth Argyle F.C. season =

English football club season

Plymouth Argyle
2004–05 season
- Manager: Bobby Williamson
- Stadium: Home Park
- Championship: 17th
- FA Cup: Third round (eliminated by Everton)
- Football League Cup: First round (eliminated by Yeovil Town)
- Highest home attendance: 20,555 vs Leeds United
- Lowest home attendance: 13,308 vs Burnley
- Biggest win: 5–0 (vs. Brighton & Hove Albion, home)
- Biggest defeat: 5–0 (vs. West Ham United, away)

This article provides a summary of Plymouth Argyle's 2004–05 season.

== Notable events ==
- 24 August 2004: The team exit the League Cup in the first round for the 12th consecutive year.
- 28 August 2004: Argyle lose their first League game (3–1 to Watford) since Bobby Williamson was appointed as manager.

== Players ==
=== First-team squad ===
Squad at end of season

Note: Flags indicate national team as defined under FIFA eligibility rules; some limited exceptions apply. Players may hold more than one non-FIFA nationality.

No.	Pos.	Nation	Player
1	GK	FRA	Romain Larrieu
2	DF	IRL	David Worrell
3	MF	ENG	Lee Hodges
5	DF	IRL	Graham Coughlan
6	MF	SCO	Keith Lasley
7	MF	ENG	David Norris
8	MF	HUN	Ákos Buzsáky
9	FW	IRL	Mickey Evans (Note: Evans was born in Plymouth, England, but qualified to represent the Republic of Ireland internationally and made his international debut for the Republic of Ireland in October 1997.)
10	MF	ISL	Bjarni Guðjónsson
11	FW	SCO	Steven Milne
13	DF	FRA	Mathias Kouo-Doumbé

No.	Pos.	Nation	Player
14	DF	NIR	Tony Capaldi (Note: Capaldi was born in Porsgrunn, Norway, and raised in England, but also qualified to represent Scotland and Northern Ireland internationally through his father and grandmother respectively and represented Northern Ireland at under-18 and under-21 level before making his international debut for Northern Ireland in March 2004.)
15	DF	ENG	Paul Wotton
16	DF	ENG	Hasney Aljofree
17	FW	ENG	Nick Chadwick
19	FW	ENG	Scott Taylor
22	DF	ENG	Paul Connolly
23	DF	ENG	Luke McCormick
24	DF	WAL	Peter Gilbert (Note: Gilbert was born in Newcastle upon Tyne, England, but also qualified to represent Wales internationally and represented Wales at under-21 level.)
25	DF	ENG	Ryan Dickson
29	MF	ENG	Luke Summerfield

=== Left club during season ===
Note: Flags indicate national team as defined under FIFA eligibility rules; some limited exceptions apply. Players may hold more than one non-FIFA nationality.

No.	Pos.	Nation	Player
4	MF	FRA	David Friio (to Nottingham Forest)
4	DF	ENG	Jason Dodd (on loan from Southampton)
8	FW	SCO	Stevie Crawford (to Dundee United)
17	MF	ENG	Lee Makel (to Dunfermline Athletic)
18	FW	ENG	Nathan Lowndes (to Port Vale)

No.	Pos.	Nation	Player
19	FW	SCO	Marino Keith (to Colchester United)
20	MF	ENG	Steve Adams (to Sheffield Wednesday)
21	FW	SCO	Blair Sturrock (to Kidderminster Harriers)
21	FW	ENG	Dexter Blackstock (Note: Blackstock was born in Oxford, England, and represented England at under-18, under-19 and under-21 level, but also qualified to represent Jamaica and Antigua and Barbuda internationally through his father and grandfather respectively and made his international debut for Antigua and Barbuda in February 2012.) (on loan from Southampton)
29	FW	ENG	Stewart Yetton (to Tiverton Town)

== Competitions ==
=== Championship ===
==== League table ====
Pos	Team	Pld	W	D	L	GF	GA	GD	Pts
15	Leicester City	46	12	21	13	49	46	+3	57
16	Cardiff City	46	13	15	18	48	51	−3	54
17	Plymouth Argyle	46	14	11	21	52	64	−12	53
18	Watford	46	12	16	18	52	59	−7	52
19	Coventry City	46	13	13	20	61	73	−12	52

Updated to match(es) played on 9 December 2011. Source: Football League Tables
Rules for classification: 1) points; 2) goal difference; 3) number of goals scored.

==== Matches ====
Championship match details
Date	Opponent	Venue	Result	Score F–A	Scorers	Attendance	Ref.
7 August 2004	Millwall	Home	D	0–0		16,063	
10 August 2004	Brighton & Hove Albion	Away	W	2–0	Cullip 11' o.g., Wotton 45' pen.	6,387	
13 August 2004	Cardiff City	Away	W	1–0	Bullock 24' o.g.	12,697	
21 August 2004	Sunderland	Home	W	2–1	Wotton 1', Crawford 40'	16,874	
28 August 2004	Watford	Away	L	1–3	Evans 18'	13,104	
30 August 2004	Nottingham Forest	Home	W	3–2	Norris 26', Coughlan 40', Wotton 90' pen.	17,538	
11 September 2004	Queens Park Rangers	Away	L	2–3	Friio 7', Keith 90'	15,425	
14 September 2004	Leeds United	Home	L	0–1		20,555	
18 September 2004	Wolverhampton Wanderers	Home	L	1–2	Friio 62'	18,635	
25 September 2004	Ipswich Town	Away	L	2–3	Adams 12', Crawford 13'	23,270	
28 September 2004	Preston North End	Away	D	1–1	Kouo-Doumbé 19'	11,445	
2 October 2004	Gillingham	Home	W	2–1	Friio 90', 90'	13,665	
16 October 2004	Wigan Athletic	Home	L	1–2	Crawford 77'	14,443	
19 October 2004	Rotherham United	Away	W	1–0	Kouo-Doumbé 65'	5,088	
23 October 2004	Sheffield United	Away	L	1–2	Friio 87'	18,893	
30 October 2004	West Ham United	Home	D	1–1	Wotton 76'	20,220	
2 November 2004	Reading	Home	D	2–2	Ingimarsson 18' o.g., Crawford 41'	14,336	
6 November 2004	Wigan Athletic	Away	W	2–0	Wootton 40', Crawford 69'	10,294	
13 November 2004	Coventry City	Away	L	1–2	Evans 48'	15,314	
20 November 2004	Stoke City	Home	D	0–0		15,264	
27 November 2004	Leicester City	Away	L	1–2	Capaldi 9'	23,799	
4 December 2004	Burnley	Home	W	1–0	Wotton 90' pen.	13,308	
11 December 2004	Crewe Alexandra	Away	L	0–3		6,823	
18 December 2004	Derby County	Home	L	0–2		15,335	
26 December 2004	Queens Park Rangers	Home	W	2–1	Wotton 13', Evans 49'	19,535	
28 December 2004	Leeds United	Away	L	1–2	Crawford 90'	34,496	
1 January 2005	Wolverhampton Wanderers	Away	D	1–1	Friio 58'	27,564	
3 January 2005	Ipswich Town	Home	L	1–2	Evans 87'	17,923	
15 January 2005	Gillingham	Away	L	0–1		8,451	
22 January 2005	Preston North End	Home	L	0–2		13,663	
5 February 2005	Reading	Away	D	0–0		19,783	
12 February 2005	Rotherham United	Home	D	1–1	Wotton 51' pen.	14,798	
19 February 2005	West Ham United	Away	L	0–5		25,490	
22 February 2005	Sheffield United	Home	W	3–0	Coughlan 3', Wotton 47', Blackstock 88'	13,953	
26 February 2005	Crewe Alexandra	Home	W	3–0	Wotton 25', Blackstock 68', Taylor 90'	14,918	
5 March 2005	Derby County	Away	L	0–1		27,581	
12 March 2005	Brighton & Hove Albion	Home	W	5–1	Chadwick 8', Wotton 13' pen., 21', Norris 36', Taylor 88'	15,606	
15 March 2005	Sunderland	Away	L	1–5	Taylor 88'	25,258	
20 March 2005	Millwall	Away	L	0–3		11,465	
2 April 2005	Cardiff City	Home	D	1–1	Aljofree 60'	18,045	
5 April 2005	Watford	Home	W	1–0	Buzsáky 10'	15,333	
9 April 2005	Nottingham Forest	Away	W	3–0	Blackstock 3', 59', Norris 23'	28,887	
16 April 2005	Stoke City	Away	L	0–2		13,017	
23 April 2005	Coventry City	Home	D	1–1	Capaldi 90'	18,443	
30 April 2005	Burnley	Away	L	0–2		12,893	
8 May 2005	Leicester City	Home	D	0–0		19,199	

=== FA Cup ===
FA Cup match details
Round	Date	Opponents	Venue	Result	Score F–A	Scorers	Attendance	Ref.
Third round	8 January 2005	Everton	Home	L	1–3	Guðjónsson 34'	20,112	

=== League Cup ===
League Cup match details
Round	Date	Opponents	Venue	Result	Score F–A	Scorers	Attendance	Ref.
First round	24 August 2004	Yeovil Town	Away	L	2–3 (a.e.t.)	Crawford 30', Wotton 42' pen.	6,217	

== Transfers ==
=== Out ===
Date	Player	Transfer	To	Fee	Source
11 August 2004	Marcus Martin	Season-long loan	Exeter City	–	
August 2004	Gary Sawyer	Season-long loan	Exeter City	–	
October 2004	Nathan Lowndes	Free	Port Vale	–	
December 2004	Blair Sturrock	Free	Kidderminster Harriers	–	
December 2004	Lee Makel	Free	Dunfermline Athletic	–	
January 2005	Stevie Crawford	Sale	Dundee United	£80,000	
February 2005	David Friio	Sale	Nottingham Forest	£100,000	

=== In ===
Date	Player	Transfer	From	Fee	Source
December 2004	Bjarni Guðjónsson	Free transfer	Coventry City	–	
December 2004	Scott Taylor	Buy	Blackpool	£100,000	
January 2005	Ákos Buzsáky	Short-term loan	Porto	–	
February 2005	Dexter Blackstock	Short-term loan	Southampton	–	
February 2005	Nick Chadwick	Buy	Everton	£250,000	
March 2005	Jason Dodd	Short-term loan	Southampton	–	
June 2005	Rufus Brevett	Free transfer	West Ham United	–	
