= 1998–99 Plymouth Argyle F.C. season =

English football club season

Plymouth Argyle F.C.
1998–99 season
- Chairman: Dan McCauley
- Manager: Kevin Hodges
- Stadium: Home Park
- Third Division: 13th
- FA Cup: Third round
- Football League Cup: First round
- Football League Trophy: First round
- Top goalscorer: League: Dwight Marshall (12); All: Dwight Marshall (12)
- Highest home attendance: 16,730 (vs Derby, 3 January)
- Lowest home attendance: 3,589 (vs Scunthorpe, 30 March)
- Average home league attendance: 5,322
Home colours

The 1998–99 season was the 104th season in the history of Plymouth Argyle Football Club, their 74th in the Football League,

== Players ==
=== First-team squad ===
Squad at end of season

Note: Flags indicate national team as defined under FIFA eligibility rules; some limited exceptions apply. Players may hold more than one non-FIFA nationality.

No.	Pos.	Nation	Player
—	GK	ENG	Jon Sheffield
—	GK	ENG	James Dungey
—	DF	ENG	Simon Collins
—	DF	ENG	Jon Beswetherick
—	DF	ENG	Nicky Marker
—	DF	ENG	Adam Barrett
—	DF	ENG	Paul Gibbs
—	DF	ENG	Mick Heathcote (captain)
—	DF	ENG	Paul Wotton
—	DF	ENG	Jon Ashton
—	MF	ENG	Martin Barlow
—	MF	ENG	Darren Bastow
—	MF	ENG	Richard Flash
—	MF	ENG	Terry Sweeney

No.	Pos.	Nation	Player
—	MF	ENG	Brendan McGovern
—	MF	ENG	Liam Ford
—	MF	ENG	James Gill
—	MF	ENG	Chris Hargreaves
—	MF	ENG	Lee Phillips
—	MF	ENG	Steve McCall
—	MF	ENG	Ronnie Mauge (Note: Mauge was born in Islington, England, but also qualified to represent Trinidad and Tobago internationally and made his international debut for Trinidad and Tobago in 2000.)
—	MF	ENG	Kevin Wills
—	MF	ENG	Steve Adams
—	FW	WAL	Sean McCarthy
—	FW	SCO	Martin Gritton
—	FW	JAM	Dwight Marshall
—	FW	ENG	Glen Crowe
—	FW	LCA	Earl Jean

=== Left club during season ===
Note: Flags indicate national team as defined under FIFA eligibility rules; some limited exceptions apply. Players may hold more than one non-FIFA nationality.

No.	Pos.	Nation	Player
—	DF	ENG	Darren Edmondson (on loan from Huddersfield Town)
—	DF	ENG	Craig Taylor (on loan from Swindon Town)
—	DF	ENG	Guy Branston (on loan from Leicester City)
—	MF	ENG	Nick Crittenden (on loan from Chelsea)

No.	Pos.	Nation	Player
—	FW	ENG	Howard Forinton (on loan from Birmingham City)
—	FW	ENG	Steve Guinan (on loan from Nottingham Forest)
—	FW	ENG	Mark Sale (on loan from Colchester United)
—	FW	IRL	Lee Power (Note: Power was born in Lewisham, England, but also qualified to represent the Republic of Ireland internationally and represented the Republic of Ireland at U-21 and B level.) (to Halifax Town)

== Third Division ==
=== Final standings ===
Pos	Team	Pld	W	D	L	GF	GA	GD	Pts
11	Darlington	46	18	11	17	69	58	+11	65
12	Exeter City	46	17	12	17	47	50	−3	63
13	Plymouth Argyle	46	17	10	19	58	54	+4	61
14	Chester City	46	13	18	15	57	66	−9	57
15	Shrewsbury Town	46	14	14	18	52	63	−11	56

Rules for classification: 1) Points; 2) Goals scored; 3) Goal difference

=== Results by round ===
Round	1	2	3	4	5	6	7	8	9	10	11	12	13	14	15	16	17	18	19	20	21	22	23	24	25	26	27	28	29	30	31	32	33	34	35	36	37	38	39	40	41	42	43	44	45	46
Ground	H	A	H	A	H	A	A	H	A	H	A	A	A	H	H	A	H	A	H	A	H	A	H	A	H	A	A	H	H	A	H	H	H	H	A	A	H	H	A	H	A	H	A	H	A	A
Result	W	L	W	W	W	L	W	L	W	D	D	L	W	D	W	L	L	L	L	L	W	D	W	D	W	L	D	D	W	W	W	L	D	D	L	L	W	W	L	L	L	L	W	D	L	L
Position	7	14	7	4	3	5	3	5	4	4	6	10	9	9	5	7	9	10	12	13	13	13	12	13	10	10	11	11	11	10	5	7	8	8	10	10	10	8	8	10	11	12	11	11	12	13

Source: Statto.com
A = Away; H = Home; W = Win; D = Draw; L = Loss

=== Matches ===
Win	Draw	Loss

Date	Opponent	Venue	Result F–A	Scorers	Attendance
8 August 1998	Rochdale	Home	2–1	Mauge, Jean	5,547
15 August 1998	Mansfield Town	Away	0–2		2,451
22 August 1998	Barnet	Home	2–0	Heathcote, McCarthy	5,080
29 August 1998	Scunthorpe United	Away	2–0	Heathcote, Jean	2,868
31 August 1998	Halifax Town	Home	1–0	Gibbs	6,544
5 September 1998	Cardiff City	Away	0–1		3,939
8 September 1998	Rotherham United	Away	2–0	Gibbs, McCarthy	3,442
12 September 1998	Darlington	Home	1–2	Mauge	5,709
19 September 1998	Peterborough United	Away	2–0	Heathcote, Barlow	5,870
26 September 1998	Scarborough	Home	0–0		5,216
3 October 1998	Torquay United	Away	1–1	Gibbs	5,719
17 October 1998	Shrewsbury Town	Away	1–2	Own-goal	2,778
20 October 1998	Brighton & Hove Albion	Away	3–1	Collins, Barlow (2)	1,793
31 October 1998	Hull City	Home	0–0		4,285
3 November 1998	Brentford	Home	3–0	Barlow, Taylor, Bastow	4,650
7 November 1998	Hartlepool United	Away	0–2		2,121
10 November 1998	Swansea City	Home	1–2	Marshall	4,517
21 November 1998	Southend United	Away	0–1		3,814
28 November 1998	Leyton Orient	Home	2–4	own-goal, Collins	4,240
12 December 1998	Cambridge United	Away	0–1		3,993
19 December 1998	Carlisle United	Home	2–0	Bastow, McCarthy	4,236
26 December 1998	Barnet	Away	1–1	Forinton	2,519
28 December 1998	Exeter City	Away	1–0	Forinton	11,936
9 January 1999	Rochdale	Away	1–1	Branston	1,922
16 January 1999	Mansfield Town	Home	3–0	Marshall (2), Hargreaves	4,399
23 January 1999	Halifax Town	Away	0–2		2,762
30 January 1999	Exeter City	Away	1–1	Forinton	6,746
6 February 1999	Cardiff City	Home	1–1	Marshall	6,062
13 February 1999	Rotherham United	Home	1–0	Marshall	4,336
20 February 1999	Darlington	Away	2–1	Jean, Marshall	2,643
23 February 1999	Chester City	Home	2–0	Sweeney, Marshall	4,208
27 February 1999	Peterborough United	Home	0–2		5,959
9 March 1999	Torquay United	Home	0–0		7,856
13 March 1999	Hartlepool United	Home	0–0		4,441
20 March 1999	Hull City	Away	0–1		6,294
27 March 1999	Chester City	Away	2–3	Marshall, Hargreaves	1,982
30 March 1999	Scunthorpe United	Home	5–0	Guinan (3), Marshall, Sale	3,589
3 April 1999	Shrewsbury Town	Home	2–0	Marshall, Barlow	5,749
5 April 1999	Brentford	Away	1–3	Marshall	6,979
10 April 1999	Brighton & Hove Albion	Home	1–2	Guinan	4,911
13 April 1999	Leyton Orient	Away	3–4	Guinan, Marshall, Mauge	4,095
17 April 1999	Southend United	Home	0–3		3,949
24 April 1999	Swansea City	Away	3–2	Guinan (2), Wotton	5,660
1 May 1999	Cambridge United	Home	0–3		5,006
5 May 1999	Scarborough	Away	0–3		2,398
8 May 1999	Carlisle United	Away	1–2	Phillips	7,599

== Football League Trophy ==
=== Matches ===
8 December 1998 Round One Southern Section	Brentford	2–0	Plymouth Argyle	Griffin Park, Brentford
19:45				Attendance: 1,580

== Football League Cup ==
=== Matches ===
11 August 1998 Round One 1st Leg	Plymouth Argyle	1–3	Portsmouth	Home Park, Plymouth
19:45	McCarthy			Attendance: 4,380

18 August 1998 Round One 2nd Leg	Portsmouth	3–2	Plymouth Argyle	Fratton Park, Portsmouth
19:45			Jean; McCarthy	Attendance: 5,479

== FA Cup ==
=== Matches ===
14 November 1998 Round One	Plymouth Argyle	0–0	Kidderminster Harriers	Home Park, Plymouth
15:00				Attendance: 4,284

24 November 1999 Round One Replay	Kidderminster Harriers	0–0; Abandoned half time due to FOG	Plymouth Argyle	Aggborough, Kidderminster
19:45

1 December 1998 Round One Replay	Kidderminster Harriers	0–0 AET; Plymouth Win 5–4 Penalties	Plymouth Argyle	Aggborough, Kidderminster
19:45				Attendance: 4,471

5 December 1998 Round Two	Wycombe Wanderers	1–1	Plymouth Argyle	Adams Park, High Wycombe
15:00				Attendance: 3,493

15 December 1998 Round Two Replay	Plymouth Argyle	3–2	Wycombe	Home Park, Plymouth
19:45			Heathcote; Terry Sweeney; Wotton	Attendance: 4,304

2 January 1999 Round Three	Plymouth Argyle	0–3	Derby	Home Park, Plymouth
15:00				Attendance: 16,730
