= Luke McCormick (footballer, born 1983) =

English footballer (born 1983)

Personal information
- Full name: Luke Martin McCormick
- Date of birth: 15 August 1983 (age 43)
- Place of birth: Coventry, England
- Height: 6 ft 0 in (1.83 m)
- Position: Goalkeeper

Team information
- Current team: Plymouth Parkway

Youth career
- Coventry City
- Derby County
- West Bromwich Albion
- –2000: Plymouth Argyle

Senior career*
Years	Team	Apps	(Gls)
2000–2008	Plymouth Argyle	138	(0)
2004	→ Boston United (loan)	2	(0)
2012–2013	Truro City	10	(0)
2013	Oxford United	15	(0)
2013–2018	Plymouth Argyle	168	(0)
2018–2020	Swindon Town	29	(0)
2020–2022	Plymouth Argyle	2	(0)
2021	→ Truro City (loan)	1	(0)
2024–	Plymouth Parkway	13	(0)
Total		378	(0)
- * Club domestic league appearances and goals as of 09:11, 9 June 2026 (UTC)

Luke Martin McCormick (born 15 August 1983) is an English footballer who plays as a goalkeeper for Southern League Premier Division South club Plymouth Parkway. He made 350 appearances for Plymouth Argyle in three separate spells at the club.

Starting his career at Argyle, McCormick was jailed for causing death by dangerous driving in 2008 after causing a car collision which resulted in the deaths of two children. He was released from prison on 6 June 2012.

He returned to football playing on non-contract terms for Truro City in November 2012, before returning to league football on 31 January 2013 with Oxford United. He was released at the end of the 2012–13 season and, in May 2013, re-signed for Plymouth Argyle on a one-year contract. In August 2016, McCormick became captain of the club after the departure of Curtis Nelson. He left Plymouth Argyle at the end of the 2017–2018 season after making 347 appearances for the club. In the summer of 2018, he signed for Swindon Town on a free deal. He went on to make 29 league appearances for the club and played as backup to Steven Benda as the club won the League Two title in 2019–20. After being released by the Robins, McCormick signed for Plymouth Argyle for the third time in his career, before announcing his retirement from professional football on 13 May 2022.

== Career ==
=== Early career ===
McCormick came through the ranks at Plymouth Argyle, making his debut on the final day of the 2000–01 season, in a 0–0 draw at home to Rochdale. The following 2001–02 season, McCormick didn't feature at all, with Argyle opting for emergency-loan signing Chris Adamson ahead of McCormick, for the one game missed by Frenchman Romain Larrieu that season. In the 2002–03 season, unavailability from Larrieu saw McCormick play five games in a row, starting with a 2–1 Football League Trophy win against Chester City. He would play in the following two league games, before being dropped for emergency-loan signing Danny Milosevic, who in his one game for Argyle got injured, and substituted off for McCormick. He played his final game of the season on 12 November, in a 1–0 defeat to Brentford in the Football League Trophy.

==== Contention with Larrieu ====
An injury to Larrieu early in the 2003–04 season saw McCormick become first choice for the rest of the campaign, playing 43 games across all competitions, as Argyle were promoted as Champions of Division Two. McCormick and Larrieu would compete for the goalkeeping position for the next season, with both playing 24 games each, even with McCormick going out loan for a month to League Two side Boston United.

Larrieu re-established himself in 2005–06, leaving McCormick to play just 3 games all season. McCormick got his chance as first-choice keeper again in 2006–07 after Larrieu was diagnosed with testicular cancer. McCormick again played over 40 games in all competitions, including in Argyle's 1–0 defeat to Watford in the FA Cup Quarter-final.

For the following 2007–08 season, McCormick started as back-up to Larrieu, but got his chance as number 1 again when Larrieu was loaned out to Yeovil Town. After a 2–1 defeat to Sheffield Wednesday, McCormick lost his spot to the returning Larrieu, who played in a dozen games before falling ill to testicular cancer again, seeing McCormick become first choice once again. He received his first red card of his career in the 71st minute of a 1–0 defeat away to Scunthorpe United, for handling the ball outside his area. Defender Lee Hodges took over goalkeeping duties for the rest of the game, and emergency-loan signing Rab Douglas played the next game, before McCormick re-gained his place in the team, as Argyle went on to finish 10th in the Championship. A 1–0 defeat away to Wolverhampton Wanderers on 4 May 2008 would prove to be his final game for over four years. McCormick had played 157 games for Argyle, appearing as a substitute once.

=== Car crash and conviction ===
On 7 June 2008, McCormick was arrested by patrol units of the Central Motorway Police Group on suspicion of causing death by dangerous driving. McCormick's Range Rover collided with a Toyota Previa at 5.45am between junctions 15 and 16 of the southbound M6 motorway, near Keele Services in Staffordshire. The crash resulted in the death of Arron and Ben Peak, aged ten and eight, from the Partington area of Manchester. Their father, Philip, the driver of the Previa, was taken to the University Hospital of North Staffordshire with fractures to the neck, back, ribs and swelling of the lungs.

The following day, McCormick was charged by Staffordshire Police with two counts of causing death by dangerous driving, driving with excess alcohol in his blood, and driving with no insurance. He appeared at Fenton Magistrates' Court on 9 June and was granted conditional bail until 16 June when he appeared at Stoke-on-Trent Crown Court. At this hearing the charge of driving without insurance was dropped against McCormick and the case was adjourned until 8 September and subsequently to 6 October.

On 2 July 2008, McCormick was suspended by Plymouth Argyle, and his contract was cancelled by mutual consent on 22 July. He pleaded guilty to charges of causing death by dangerous driving and driving with excess alcohol, and received a sentence of seven years and four months' imprisonment and a four-year driving ban on 6 October. McCormick served time at both HM Prison Ranby and HM Prison Channings Wood before being released from HM Prison Leyhill on 6 June 2012.

=== Post-prison career ===
==== Trials and Truro ====
In May 2012, with his release from prison pending, Swindon Town announced their intention to offer McCormick a trial period, but they finished the trial in August 2012 without offering him a contract.

McCormick signed with Conference South club Truro City on a non-contract basis in November 2012 and made his debut against Farnborough in the FA Trophy on 10 November. Although in administration, Truro were permitted to sign a goalkeeper when their only other keeper, Tim Sandercombe, was injured.

==== Oxford United ====
McCormick played 11 times for Truro before he re-entered league football for the first time in four and a half years by signing for League Two side Oxford United on 31 January 2013, on a contract until the end of the 2012–13 season. He played 15 matches for Oxford, but lost his first team place to Max Crocombe by mid-April and he was released at the end of the season.

==== Return to Argyle ====
In May 2013, it was reported that McCormick was in talks to return to Plymouth Argyle, five years after his departure; on 9 May 2013 he re-signed for the club on a one-year contract. McCormick managed to establish himself as Argyle's first choice goalkeeper ahead of Jake Cole until he fractured and dislocated a finger on his left hand in a 1–1 draw with Mansfield Town on 1 February 2014, which ruled him out for the rest of the season. Despite this setback, McCormick signed a new 2-year contract with the club at the end of the season.

McCormick was handed the role of club captain before the start of the 2014–15 season. The campaign was a strong one for McCormick, as he started all 53 league and cup matches, kept 22 clean sheets and won Argyle's player of the year award. The club reached the League Two playoffs but fell to a 5–3 aggregate defeat to Wycombe Wanderers in the semi-final.

The 2015–16 season saw McCormick play all but six of Plymouth Argyle's league games, conceding an average of 1 goal per game. He suffered an injury in mid-November and was deputised by James Bittner, and later Christian Walton, before finally making his return to the side on 19 December in a 2–1 away win against Hartlepool United. McCormick was later rested for the last league game of the season, Argyle's home game against Hartlepool, in which Vincent Dorel started in his place in a 5–0 win. Argyle reached the League Two play-offs once again, this time falling to a 2–0 defeat to AFC Wimbledon in the final at Wembley, with goals scored by Lyle Taylor and Adebayo Akinfenwa.

Following the Wembley defeat, captain Curtis Nelson left the club to join Oxford United, and so for the start of the 2016–17 season McCormick was handed the role of captain, meaning he would wear the armband out on the pitch for the first time. Argyle made it to the third round of the 2016–17 FA Cup with a 1–0 replay win at Newport County, thanks to an extra time goal from Graham Carey, and drew Liverpool away from home. McCormick kept a clean sheet as Argyle drew 0–0, earning a replay. The replay was played at Home Park, in which, despite McCormick saving a Divock Origi penalty, Argyle lost 1–0.

McCormick was released by Plymouth at the end of the 2017–18 season.

==== Swindon Town ====
He joined League Two side Swindon Town in July 2018 after a successful trial. He signed a one-year contract. He made his debut on 7 August 2018 in a 4–0 defeat to Chelsea U23s in the EFL Trophy. When first-choice keeper Lawrence Vigouroux received a call-up for the Chile national football team, McCormick deputised, and kept his place when Vigouroux returned from international duty, after only conceding four goals in his first seven starts. Vigouroux eventually regained his place from McCormick in October, until 23 March when McCormick started in a 4–0 win against Morecambe, and played every game until the end of the season. He finished the 2018–19 season playing 21 games, with 17 of those appearances coming in the league.

McCormick started the 2019–20 season as first-choice, starting all 14 games in all competitions until a 2–1 defeat to Bradford City on 5 October 2019. Loan keeper Steven Benda then took over goalkeeping duties, leaving McCormick to only play one more game for the rest of the season: a 1–0 EFL Trophy defeat to Bristol Rovers.

Swindon Town were promoted as Champions of the 2019–20 League Two season on PPG, and McCormick was offered a new contract for the 2020–21 season.

==== Third spell with Argyle ====
Having rejected the offer of a contract extension at Swindon, on 28 July 2020, McCormick joined Plymouth Argyle for a third time. "We feel Luke will provide good competition with Mike Cooper for the first-team position," said manager Ryan Lowe.

McCormick featured as a substitute for Argyle's last two games of the 2020–21 season, to make his 349th, and 350th appearances for the club. On 24 June 2021, it was revealed he had signed a new contract to remain at the club as an emergency 'training goalkeeper', with Mike Cooper and new signing Callum Burton taking the main first-team duties.

==== Emergency loan to Truro ====
On 2 November 2021, McCormick made a return to Truro City, this time on an emergency loan deal. He played in Truro's 1–0 FA Trophy Qualifier win against Cirencester Town that day, replacing the suspended James Hamon.

==== Retirement and Plymouth Parkway ====
On 3 May 2022, McCormick's retirement was announced in Plymouth's retained list.

Ahead of the 2024–25 season, McCormick came out of retirement and was registered with Southern League side Plymouth Parkway.

== Career statistics ==
As of end of 2025–26 season

Appearances and goals by club, season and competition
Club	Season	League			FA Cup		League Cup		Other		Total	
Club	Season	Division	Apps	Goals	Apps	Goals	Apps	Goals	Apps	Goals	Apps	Goals
Plymouth Argyle	2000–01	Third Division	1	0	0	0	0	0	0	0	1	0
Plymouth Argyle	2001–02	Third Division	0	0	0	0	0	0	0	0	0	0
Plymouth Argyle	2002–03	Second Division	3	0	0	0	0	0	2 (Note: Appearance(s) in Football League/EFL Trophy)	0	5	0
Plymouth Argyle	2003–04	Second Division	40	0	1	0	0	0	2	0	43	0
Plymouth Argyle	2004–05	Championship	23	0	0	0	1	0	—		24	0
Plymouth Argyle	2005–06	Championship	1	0	0	0	2	0	—		3	0
Plymouth Argyle	2006–07	Championship	40	0	5	0	1	0	—		46	0
Plymouth Argyle	2007–08	Championship	30	0	2	0	3	0	—		35	0
Plymouth Argyle	Total		138	0	8	0	7	0	4	0	157	0
Boston United (loan)	2004–05	League Two	2	0	—		—		—		2	0
Truro City	2012–13	Conference South	10	0	—		—		1 (Note: Appearance(s) in FA Trophy)	0	11	0
Oxford United	2012–13	League Two	15	0	—		—		—		15	0
Plymouth Argyle	2013–14	League Two	27	0	1	0	0	0	0	0	28	0
Plymouth Argyle	2014–15	League Two	46	0	2	0	1	0	4 (Note: Two appearances in Football League Trophy, two appearances in League Two play-offs)	0	53	0
Plymouth Argyle	2015–16	League Two	40	0	1	0	1	0	6 (Note: Three appearances in Football League Trophy, three appearances in League Two play-offs)	0	48	0
Plymouth Argyle	2016–17	League Two	46	0	5	0	0	0	0	0	51	0
Plymouth Argyle	2017–18	League One	9	0	1	0	0	0	0	0	10	0
Plymouth Argyle	Total		168	0	10	0	2	0	10	0	190	0
Swindon Town	2018–19	League Two	17	0	1	0	0	0	3	0	21	0
Swindon Town	2019–20	League Two	12	0	0	0	1	0	2	0	15	0
Swindon Town	Total		29	0	1	0	1	0	5	0	36	0
Plymouth Argyle	2020–21	League One	2	0	0	0	0	0	1	0	3	0
Plymouth Argyle	2021–22	League One	0	0	0	0	0	0	0	0	0	0
Plymouth Argyle	Total		2	0	0	0	0	0	1	0	3	0
Truro City (loan)	2021–22	Southern League Premier Division South	1	0	—		—		1	0	2	0
Plymouth Parkway	2024–25	Southern League Premier Division South	6	0	1	0	—		0	0	7	0
Plymouth Parkway	2025–26	Southern League Premier Division South	7	0	0	0	—		2 (Note: Appearances in St Luke's Challenge Cup)	0	9	0
Plymouth Parkway	Total		13	0	1	0	—		2	0	16	0
Plymouth Argyle total			308	0	18	0	9	0	15	0	350	0
Career total			378	0	20	0	10	0	24	0	432	0

== Honours ==
Plymouth Argyle

- Football League Second Division: 2003–04

Swindon Town

- EFL League Two: 2019–20

Individual

- Plymouth Argyle Player of the Season: 2014–15
- PFA Team of the Year: 2016–17 League Two
