= Tim Sandercombe =

English footballer

Personal information
- Full name: Timothy Eric Alfred Sandercombe
- Date of birth: 15 June 1989 (age 37)
- Place of birth: Enfield, England
- Position: Goalkeeper

Team information
- Current team: Weston-super-Mare

Youth career
- 2006: Queens Park Rangers

Senior career*
| Years | Team | Apps | (Gls) |
| 2006–2007 | Plymouth Argyle | 0 | (0) |
| 2007 | → Tiverton Town (loan) | 4 | (0) |
| 2007–2008 | Notts County | 0 | (0) |
| 2008–2009 | Stafford Rangers | 31 | (0) |
| 2009–2010 | Mansfield Town | 1 | (0) |
| 2010 | Weymouth | 10 | (0) |
| 2010–2011 | Worcester City | 0 | (0) |
| 2011–2013 | Truro City | 35 | (0) |
| 2013 | Bideford | 0 | (0) |
| 2013–2014 | Dorchester Town | 4 | (0) |
| 2014–? | Weston-super-Mare | 6 | (0) |
- * Club domestic league appearances and goals as of 21:56, 15 May 2012 (UTC)

Timothy Eric Alfred Sandercombe (born 15 June 1989) is an English football goalkeeper.

== Career ==
Born in Enfield, London, Sandercombe joined Notts County following his release from Plymouth Argyle. He joined on 1 July 2007 along with Paul Mayo, Adam Tann, and Hector Sam. Sandercombe made his professional debut for County in a Football League Trophy game against Leyton Orient on 3 September 2007. County lost the game 1–0 to an Efe Echanomi goal. Only 22 days after that appearance, Sandercombe put pen to paper on a new contract at Meadow Lane.

On 14 August 2008, Sandercombe had his contract cancelled with Notts County by mutual consent. After a spell in the Conference North with Stafford Rangers, he joined Mansfield Town on a one-year contract on 27 May 2009.

In February 2010, Sandercombe signed for Conference South club Weymouth until the end of the season and in March 2010 he started training with Exeter City at their Cat & Fiddle training base just so he can keep his fitness levels up between Weymouth matches and the possibility of being used as cover for the Exeter City reserves on a non contract basis.

He signed a one-year deal for Conference North club Worcester City in July 2010.

In July 2011 Sandercombe signed for newly promoted Truro City as a replacement for Martin Rice who returned to Torquay United. After a season and a half, he was injured during a league match against A.F.C. Hornchurch and Truro brought in Luke McCormick as a replacement. Truro were in administration and McCormick was playing for free, and Sandercombe subsequently left the club the following week, on 16 November 2012.

Sandercombe joined Bideford in January 2013 and made his debut against Banbury United on Saturday 12 January 2013.

After his football career ended, he became a school teacher and taught in multiple British primary schools around Devon.
