= Steve Adams (footballer, born 1980) =

English footballer

Personal information
- Full name: Stephen Marc Adams
- Date of birth: 25 September 1980 (age 46)
- Place of birth: Plymouth, England
- Height: 6 ft 0 in (1.83 m)
- Position: Midfielder

Youth career
- Plymouth Argyle

Senior career*
Years	Team	Apps	(Gls)
1999–2005	Plymouth Argyle	157	(7)
2005–2007	Sheffield Wednesday	21	(0)
2007–2008	Swindon Town	2	(0)
2008–2010	Torquay United	17	(0)
2009	→ Forest Green Rovers (loan)	6	(0)
2009–2010	→ Truro City (loan)		
2010–2011	Truro City		
- * Club domestic league appearances and goals

Stephen Marc Adams (born 25 September 1980) is an English former footballer.

== Club career ==
Adams began his career as a trainee with Plymouth Argyle, his hometown team, turning professional in August 1998. His first team debut came on 8 December 1998 when he was a second-half substitute (for Mike Heathcote) as Plymouth lost 2–0 away to Brentford in the first round of the Football League Trophy. He had to wait until 6 May 2000 for his league debut, playing in the 2–2 draw away to Mansfield Town. He was an ever-present member of the Argyle side that won the Third Division Championship in 2001–2002 and was rewarded with a new two-year contract at the end of the season.

He was also a vital member of the Argyle sides that won the Division Two title in 2003–2004.

He went on to make 176 appearances, scoring seven goals for Argyle before moving to Sheffield Wednesday, managed by former Plymouth manager Paul Sturrock, in March 2005 for an undisclosed fee. He signed a deal that would keep him at Hillsborough until 2007. His 2005–2006 season was hampered by an Achilles injury problem and Adams managed to make only eight appearances. Despite his injuries, former manager Sturrock rated him as one of his very best players. He was released by Sturrock's successor, Brian Laws, in May 2007. Adams had made 21 appearances in all competitions for Sheffield Wednesday.

Adams joined up with Sturrock again, signing for Swindon Town in August 2007 after a successful trial. In January 2008, Adams was offered a new short-term contract with Swindon until the end of the season but turned it down when Torquay United offered him a better contract. He had made six appearances in all competitions for Swindon.

Adams joined Conference National side Torquay United along with fellow Swindon Town midfielder Kaid Mohamed in January 2008. He made his debut on 28 January 2008 in the 1–0 win at home to Histon and made 15 starts in all competitions, as Torquay made both the play-off semi-final and the FA Trophy final.

Since then, he failed to cement a starting place at Plainmoor and made just two starts in all competitions the following season.

Adams signed for Forest Green Rovers on loan in August 2009 making six league appearances in a one-month loan spell.

In October 2009 Adams signed a 3-month loan deal with Truro City. This was extended on 16 January 2010 to the end of the season.

He was released by Torquay on 15 May 2010 along with six other players.

He signed for Truro City permanently in July 2010.

== Career statistics ==
Appearances and goals by club, season and competition
Club	Season	League			FA Cup		League Cup		Other		Total	
Club	Season	Division	Apps	Goals	Apps	Goals	Apps	Goals	Apps	Goals	Apps	Goals
Plymouth Argyle	1998–99	Third Division	0	0	0	0	0	0	1 (Note: Appearance(s) in Football League Trophy)	0	1	0
Plymouth Argyle	1999–2000	Third Division	1	0	0	0	0	0	0	0	1	0
Plymouth Argyle	2000–01	Third Division	17	0	1	0	0	0	1	0	19	0
Plymouth Argyle	2001–02	Third Division	46	2	4	0	1	0	1	0	52	2
Plymouth Argyle	2002–03	Second Division	37	2	4	0	1	0	2	0	44	2
Plymouth Argyle	2003–04	Second Division	36	2	0	0	1	0	1	0	38	2
Plymouth Argyle	2004–05	Championship	20	1	0	0	1	0	0	0	21	1
Plymouth Argyle	Total		157	7	9	0	4	0	6	0	176	7
Sheffield Wednesday	2004–05	League One	9	0	0	0	0	0	1 (Note: Appearance(s) in League One play-offs)	0	10	0
Sheffield Wednesday	2005–06	Championship	8	0	0	0	0	0	0	0	8	0
Sheffield Wednesday	2006–07	Championship	3	0	0	0	0	0	0	0	3	0
Sheffield Wednesday	Total		20	0	0	0	0	0	1	0	21	0
Swindon Town	2007–08	League One	2	0	1	0	1	0	2	0	6	0
Torquay United	2007–08	Conference Premier	12	0	0	0	0	0	4 (Note: 2 appearances in FA Trophy, 2 appearances in Conference play-offs)	0	16	0
Torquay United	2008–09	Conference Premier	3	0	0	0	0	0	1 (Note: Appearance(s) in FA Trophy)	0	4	0
Torquay United	2009–10	League Two	0	0	0	0	0	0	0	0	0	0
Torquay United	Total		15	0	0	0	0	0	5	0	20	0
Forest Green Rovers (loan)	2009–10	Conference Premier	6	0	0	0	0	0	0	0	6	0
Career total			200	7	10	0	5	0	14	0	229	7

== Honours ==
Plymouth Argyle

- Football League Second Division: 2003–04
- Football League Third Division: 2001–02

Sheffield Wednesday

- Football League One play-offs: 2005
