= Martin Phillips (footballer) =

English footballer

Personal information
- Full name: Martin John Phillips
- Date of birth: 13 March 1976 (age 50)
- Place of birth: Exeter, Devon, England
- Position: Winger

Youth career
- –1994: Exeter City

Senior career*
Years	Team	Apps	(Gls)
1994–1995	Exeter City	52	(5)
1995–1998	Manchester City	15	(0)
1998	Scunthorpe United (loan)	3	(0)
1998	Exeter City (loan)	8	(0)
1998–2000	Portsmouth	24	(1)
1999	Bristol Rovers (loan)	2	(0)
2000–2004	Plymouth Argyle	114	(10)
2004–2007	Torquay United	70	(6)
Total		288	(22)
- * Club domestic league appearances and goals

Martin John "Buster" Phillips (born 13 March 1976) is an English former professional footballer.

== Life and career ==
Phillips was born in Exeter and began his football career as a trainee with his local side Exeter City, turning professional in July 1994. He soon attracted the attention of higher division clubs and moved to Manchester City in November 1995 for a fee of £500,000. This remained Exeter's record sale until they sold Matt Grimes for around £1.75 million in 2015. Upon signing Phillips, City manager Alan Ball predicted "Buster will be the first British £10 million pound player." He struggled to establish himself at Maine Road and was loaned to Scunthorpe United in January 1998 and back to Exeter City in March 1998.

He left Maine Road in August 1998, moving to Portsmouth for a fee of £100,000. Again he struggled to establish himself and spent a month on loan to Bristol Rovers in February 1999. In August 2000 he returned to Devon, joining Plymouth Argyle in August 2000 for a fee of just £25,000. He was released at the end of the 2003–04 season, after spending much of the season struggling with injuries.

He joined Torquay United on a free transfer in July 2004, becoming one of a growing band of former Plymouth players signed by Leroy Rosenior, others including Craig Taylor, Brian McGlinchey, Martin Gritton and Matthew Villis.

In November 2006, the BBC linked him with a possible move back to Exeter City, by now a Conference National side, but the move fell through and Phillips remained at Plainmoor. He failed to appear again for Torquay and in May 2007 he was forced to retire due to suffering chronic fatigue syndrome.

== Honours ==
Plymouth Argyle

- Football League Second Division: 2003–04
- Football League Third Division: 2001–02
