= Osvaldo Lopes =

French professional footballer (born 1980)

Personal information
- Full name: Osvaldo Lopes
- Date of birth: 6 April 1980 (age 46)
- Place of birth: Fréjus, France
- Position: Midfielder

Senior career*
Years	Team	Apps	(Gls)
	ES Fréjus	0	(0)
	Montpellier HSC	0	(0)
	LB Châteauroux	13	(0)
2002–2003	Plymouth Argyle	9	(0)
2004	Cork City	3	(1)
2005	Torquay United	1	(0)
2005–	Kettering Town	447	(54)
- * Club domestic league appearances and goals

Osvaldo Lopes (born 6 April 1980) is a French professional footballer.

He played for his hometown club ES Fréjus, Montpellier HSC and LB Châteauroux in France before joining Plymouth Argyle in August 2002, although his debut was delayed due a delay with his international clearance. He finally made his first team debut on 10 September in a 2-1 League Cup defeat away to Crystal Palace. His league debut came four days later when he replaced Martin Phillips as a second-half substitute in the 1–1 draw away to Barnsley. He was released by Plymouth at the end of the 2002–03 season.

He joined Cork City in September 2004 but made just three substitute appearances before leaving in December 2004. He initially returned to France before returning to England to train with Torquay United. He signed a one-month contract and played for Torquay in the 1–1 draw with Huddersfield Town on 8 January 2005, but this was to be his only game for Torquay before being released later that month.

Within days of his release, he joined Conference North side Kettering Town.
