= David Worrell =

Irish footballer

Personal information
- Date of birth: 12 January 1978 (age 48)
- Place of birth: Dublin, Ireland
- Height: 1.80 m (5 ft 11 in)
- Position: Right back

Youth career
- Rush Athletic
- Home Farm
- Shelbourne

Senior career*
Years	Team	Apps	(Gls)
1997–1999	Blackburn Rovers	0	(0)
1999–2001	Dundee United	18	(0)
2000–2001	→ Plymouth Argyle (loan)	7	(0)
2001–2005	Plymouth Argyle	140	(0)
2005–2007	Rotherham United	82	(0)
2007–2008	Dundee	21	(0)
2008–2009	Montrose	13	(0)

International career
1997	Republic of Ireland U20	6	(0)
1997–1999	Republic of Ireland U21	18	(0)
1998	Republic of Ireland B	1	(0)
- * Club domestic league appearances and goals

David Worrell (born 12 January 1978) is an Irish footballer who played as a right back. Born in Dublin, he played in the Scottish Premier League for Dundee United, and the Football League for Plymouth Argyle and Rotherham United.

== Club career ==
Worrell signed for Blackburn from Shelbourne in January 1995 but had not made a first team appearance before he moved to Dundee United in March 1999. The right back made nineteen league appearances for the Scottish club before moving to Plymouth Argyle and went on to make over 150 league and cup appearances for the Home Park club during a successful spell in which they gained promotion twice. In May 2005, Worrell's contract was not renewed and he subsequently signed for Rotherham in July. At the end of the 2006–07 season, Worrell was released following Rotherham's relegation from League One, before Dundee announced his signature. In June 2008, Worrell left Dens Park to sign for Montrose, having decided to combine part-time football with another career. He played his last match for Montrose on 6 December 2008, and was diagnosed with Hodgkin lymphoma twelve days later.

== International career ==
Worrell was part of the Ireland side who finished third in the 1997 FIFA World Youth Championship, featuring in all six matches, and has been capped eighteen times by Republic of Ireland under-21, also captaining the side. In addition, he played once for the Republic of Ireland B team in February 1998 featuring alongside future internationals such as Damien Duff, Richard Dunne and Robbie Keane.

== After football ==
He trained as a financial advisor whilst playing part-time football, and moved back to Ireland following his retirement as a player. He worked as a financial consultant for Paul Kerr Associates, a company set up by Paul Kerr in 2002 to offer financial advice to professional footballers. As of 2017, he was working for Conexim, a financial services company, in Dublin.

== Career statistics ==
Appearances and goals by club, season and competition
Club	Season	League			National cup (Note: Includes Scottish Cup, FA Cup)		League cup (Note: Includes Scottish League Cup, Football League Cup)		Other		Total	
Club	Season	Division	Apps	Goals	Apps	Goals	Apps	Goals	Apps	Goals	Apps	Goals
Dundee United	1998–99	Scottish Premier League	5	0	0	0	0	0	0	0	5	0
Dundee United	1999–2000	Scottish Premier League	13	0	0	0	2	0	0	0	15	0
Dundee United	Total		18	0	0	0	2	0	0	0	20	0
Plymouth Argyle (loan)	2000–01	Third Division	7	0	0	0	0	0	2 (Note: Appearance(s) in Football League Trophy)	0	9	0
Plymouth Argyle	2000–01	Third Division	7	0	0	0	0	0	0	0	7	0
Plymouth Argyle	2001–02	Third Division	42	0	0	0	4	0	1	0	47	0
Plymouth Argyle	2002–03	Second Division	43	0	4	0	1	0	1	0	49	0
Plymouth Argyle	2003–04	Second Division	18	0	1	0	1	0	2	0	22	0
Plymouth Argyle	2004–05	Championship	30	0	0	0	1	0	0	0	31	0
Plymouth Argyle	Total		147	0	5	0	7	0	6	0	165	0
Rotherham United	2005–06	League One	41	0	1	0	2	0	1	0	45	0
Rotherham United	2006–07	League One	41	0	1	0	2	0	1	0	45	0
Rotherham United	Total		82	0	2	0	4	0	2	0	90	0
Dundee	2007–08	Scottish First Division	21	0	2	0	3	0	1 (Note: Appearance(s) in Scottish Challenge Cup)	0	27	0
Montrose	2008–09	Scottish Third Division	13	0	1	0	1	0	0	0	15	0
Career total			281	0	10	0	17	0	9	0	317	0

== Honours ==
Plymouth Argyle

- Football League Second Division: 2003–04
- Football League Third Division: 2001–02

Republic of Ireland

- FIFA World Youth Championship third place: 1997
