= Joe Broad =

English footballer

Personal information
- Full name: Joseph Reginald Broad
- Date of birth: 24 August 1982 (age 44)
- Place of birth: Bristol, England
- Height: 5 ft 11 in (1.80 m)
- Position: Midfielder

Team information
- Current team: A.F.C. St Austell

Youth career
- ?–2000: Plymouth Argyle

Senior career*
Years	Team	Apps	(Gls)
2000–2003	Plymouth Argyle	12	(0)
2001	→ Yeovil Town (loan)	4	(1)
2003–2004	Torquay United F.C.	14	(0)
2004–2006	Walsall	12	(0)
2005	→ Redditch United (loan)		
2005–2006	→ Redditch United (loan)		
2006–2014	Truro City	348	(32)
2015 –	A.F.C. St Austell	17	(0)
- * Club domestic league appearances and goals as of 3 February 2016

Joseph Reginald Broad (born 24 August 1982 in Bristol) is an English professional footballer. He currently plays for A.F.C. St Austell after leaving Southern League club Truro City.

== Career ==
Broad began his career as a trainee with Plymouth Argyle, turning professional in August 2000. He played pre-season games for Weymouth in 2001 and was linked with a loan move there, but remained with Plymouth. He made an impressive league debut on 18 August 2001, as a substitute for Sean Evers in a goalless draw away to Hull City. First team chances were sparse at Home Park, so Broad was loaned to Conference side Yeovil Town in November 2001 to gain some additional experience.

He returned after a month with Yeovil, and signed a 12-month extension to his Plymouth contract. However, he struggled to establish himself and was allowed to join Torquay United on a free transfer in September 2003. He was mainly used as a substitute by Torquay manager Leroy Rosenior and was released at the end of the season.

He was linked with a move to Southern League Tiverton Town, but in August 2004 he signed for Walsall. He was given a two-year contract extension and Merson continued to speak highly of the midfielder. However, in September 2005, Broad joined Conference North side Redditch United on loan to gain more first team experience. He returned to Walsall, but in November 2005 rejoined Redditch on loan until the end of the season.

Paul Merson later decided that he was not part of his plans at Walsall and on 16 January 2006, Broad left to join Truro City helping the Cornish side to promotion to the Western League Division One in 2006, and promotion to the Premier Division a year later. He scored the club's third and final goal in the FA Vase final on 13 May 2007, and captained the side to the Western League title the following season. By 2013, he had played in over 300 matches for Truro in all competitions. After suffering an injury near the end of the 2013–14 season, he left the club in June 2014.

== Honours ==
- Truro City
  - FA Vase
  - Winners: (1): 2006–07
  - Southern Football League Division One South & West
  - Winners: (1): 2008–09
  - Western Football League Premier Division:
  - Winners: (1): 2007–08
  - Western Football League Division One:
  - Winners: (1): 2006–07
  - Cornish Senior Cup
  - Winners: (2): 2006–07, 2007–08
