= Brian McGlinchey =

Northern Irish footballer (born 1977)

Personal information
- Full name: Brian Kevin McGlinchey
- Date of birth: 26 October 1977 (age 48)
- Place of birth: Derry, Northern Ireland
- Height: 5 ft 7 in (1.70 m)
- Position: Left-back

Senior career*
| Years | Team | Apps | (Gls) |
| 1995–1998 | Manchester City | 0 | (0) |
| 1998–1999 | Port Vale | 15 | (1) |
| 1999–2000 | Gillingham | 14 | (1) |
| 2000–2004 | Plymouth Argyle | 66 | (2) |
| 2003 | → Torquay United (loan) | 14 | (0) |
| 2004–2006 | Torquay United | 58 | (0) |
| Total | | 167 | (4) |

International career
| 1998–1999 | Northern Ireland under-21 | 14 | (0) |
| 1999 | Northern Ireland B | 1 | (0) |
- * Club domestic league appearances and goals

Brian Kevin McGlinchey (born 26 October 1977) is a Northern Irish former football defender. He made a total of 195 competitive appearances in an eleven-year career as a professional player before he was forced to retire in 2006, aged 28, due to injury. He also won 14 caps for Northern Ireland under-21s and one cap for the Northern Ireland B team.

Born in Derry, Northern Ireland, he started his career with Manchester City but joined Port Vale in 1998, having never made a first-team appearance at City. The next year, he moved on to Gillingham before he signed with Plymouth Argyle in 2000. He enjoyed four years with Plymouth before he joined Torquay United in 2004, having spent some time on loan at the club the previous year. He stayed with Torquay until his retirement two years later. His honours included three promotion campaigns, once each with Gillingham, Plymouth, and Torquay.

== Career ==
=== Manchester City and Port Vale ===
McGlinchey started his career with Manchester City in 1995 but never made a first-team appearance in his three seasons with the club. In June 1998, he was signed by Port Vale manager John Rudge. He played 15 First Division games for "Valiants" during the 1998–99 season, bagging his first senior goal in a 2–1 defeat at Oxford United on 21 November 1998.

=== Gillingham ===
He was released by manager Brian Horton and subsequently joined Peter Taylor's Second Division side Gillingham in August 1999. He started just six games in the 1999–2000 promotion season. He did not feature in the play-off final victory over Wigan Athletic. He made just one appearance in the First Division under new boss Andy Hessenthaler before he left Priestfield Stadium, dropping down two tiers to the Third Division with Plymouth Argyle in December 2000.

=== Plymouth Argyle ===
He featured 22 times at left-back in 2000–01, as Paul Sturrock's "Pilgrims" posted a mid-table finish. He then made 29 league appearances in 2001–02, as Plymouth topped the Third Division table; his contribution was limited after he broke his foot. He was limited to 21 appearances at Home Park in 2002–03 by new signing Hasney Aljofree, and played no part of the club's success in 2003–04. He was instead loaned out to Third Division side Torquay United in October 2003, with the deal being made permanent in January 2004. A poll in 2019 saw him voted the club's 19th greatest ever full-back by fans, who nicknamed him "Mad Dog".

=== Torquay United ===
He played 34 league games in 2003–04, as the "Gulls" secured promotion into League One. Manager Leroy Rosenior could not keep the Plainmoor club in the third tier, however, and McGlinchey played 37 games as Torquay were relegated into League Two in 2004–05. He signed a 12-month contract in January 2005, but picked up a hamstring injury two months later. After a further medical examination in April his injury turned out actually to be a slipped disc. An operation was necessary, and in September 2005 he went under the knife. However, this did not solve the problem and he was forced to retire in May 2006.

== Later life ==
Having passed qualifications after subsidisations from the PFA during his time at Plymouth Argyle, McGlinchey became a mortgage adviser and went on to manage ten other mortgage advisors at Lloyds Bank in Plymouth. He also commentated on Plymouth Argyle games for BBC Radio Devon. However, he continued to suffer with sciatic pain from the injury that ended his playing career and has a constant loss of feeling in his left leg. As of November 2018, he is married with three children.

== Career statistics ==
Appearances and goals by club, season and competition
| Season | Club | League | | | FA Cup | | League Cup | | Other | | Total | |
| Season | Club | Division | Apps | Goals | Apps | Goals | Apps | Goals | Apps | Goals | Apps | Goals |
|---|---|---|---|---|---|---|---|---|---|---|---|---|
| Manchester City | 1995–96 | Premier League | 0 | 0 | 0 | 0 | 0 | 0 | — | | 0 | 0 |
| Manchester City | 1996–97 | First Division | 0 | 0 | 0 | 0 | 0 | 0 | — | | 0 | 0 |
| Manchester City | 1997–98 | First Division | 0 | 0 | 0 | 0 | 0 | 0 | — | | 0 | 0 |
| Manchester City | Total | | 0 | 0 | 0 | 0 | 0 | 0 | 0 | 0 | 0 | 0 |
| Port Vale | 1998–99 | First Division | 15 | 1 | 1 | 0 | 1 | 0 | — | | 17 | 1 |
| Gillingham | 1999–2000 | Second Division | 13 | 1 | 4 | 1 | 4 | 0 | 1 (Note: Appearance(s) in the EFL Trophy.) | 0 | 22 | 2 |
| Gillingham | 2000–01 | First Division | 1 | 0 | 0 | 0 | 0 | 0 | — | | 1 | 0 |
| Gillingham | Total | | 14 | 1 | 4 | 1 | 4 | 0 | 1 | 0 | 23 | 2 |
| Plymouth Argyle | 2000–01 | Third Division | 18 | 0 | 0 | 0 | 0 | 0 | 2 | 0 | 20 | 0 |
| Plymouth Argyle | 2001–02 | Third Division | 29 | 1 | 3 | 0 | 1 | 0 | 1 | 0 | 34 | 1 |
| Plymouth Argyle | 2002–03 | Second Division | 19 | 1 | 2 | 0 | 0 | 0 | 2 | 0 | 23 | 1 |
| Plymouth Argyle | 2003–04 | Second Division | 0 | 0 | 0 | 0 | 0 | 0 | 0 | 0 | 0 | 0 |
| Plymouth Argyle | Total | | 66 | 2 | 5 | 0 | 1 | 0 | 5 | 0 | 77 | 2 |
| Torquay United | 2003–04 | Third Division | 34 | 0 | 0 | 0 | 0 | 0 | 0 | 0 | 34 | 0 |
| Torquay United | 2004–05 | League One | 33 | 0 | 1 | 0 | 1 | 0 | 2 | 0 | 37 | 0 |
| Torquay United | 2005–06 | League Two | 5 | 0 | 0 | 0 | 0 | 0 | 0 | 0 | 5 | 0 |
| Torquay United | Total | | 72 | 0 | 1 | 0 | 1 | 0 | 2 | 0 | 76 | 0 |
| Career total | | | 167 | 4 | 11 | 1 | 7 | 0 | 8 | 0 | 193 | 5 |

== Honours ==
Plymouth Argyle

- Football League Third Division: 2001–02

Torquay United

- Football League Third Division third-place promotion: 2003–04
