= Jon Beswetherick =

English footballer (born 1978)

Personal information
- Full name: Jonathan Barry Beswetherick
- Date of birth: 15 January 1978 (age 48)
- Place of birth: Liverpool, England
- Position: Defender

Senior career*
Years	Team	Apps	(Gls)
1995–2002	Plymouth Argyle	138	(0)
2002–2004	Sheffield Wednesday	11	(0)
2003	→ Swindon Town (loan)	3	(0)
2004	→ Macclesfield Town (loan)	4	(0)
2004	Bristol Rovers	0	(0)
2004–2005	Kidderminster Harriers	10	(0)
2005	Forest Green Rovers	25	(0)
2005–2008	Salisbury City	52	(1)
2007	→ Mangotsfield United (loan)	5	(0)
2008	→ Weston-super-Mare (loan)	3	(0)
2008–2009	Paulton Rovers	?	(?)
- * Club domestic league appearances and goals

Jonathan Barry Beswetherick (born 15 January 1978) is an English retired footballer who played as a defender.

== Playing career ==
Beswetherick was born in Liverpool, before moving to Plymouth where he started his career at his home town club of Plymouth Argyle making over 100 appearances before moving to Sheffield Wednesday. During his time at Hillsborough Beswetherick had loan spells at Swindon Town and Macclesfield Town and he eventually left Sheffield Wednesday to join Bristol Rovers. He appeared in the famous Jimmy Glass game against Carlisle, in which the goalkeeper scored in the 94th minute to keep Carlisle United in the Football League.

He briefly played with the Bristol Rovers before signing for Kidderminster Harriers where another short spell was followed by a move to Conference National side Forest Green Rovers. He was released by the Gloucestershire based club and dropped two divisions to sign for Salisbury City where he found two successful promotions to the Conference National as well as making over 50 appearances.

On 8 September 2007, Beswetherick joined Mangotsfield United on loan. His debut came the same day in a 0–0 draw with Hitchin Town. He made five Southern Football League Premier Division appearances, his last coming on 9 October 2007.

His spell at Mangotsfield was soon followed by another one-month loan to Weston-super-Mare on 4 January 2008. During this spell, he only managed 3 league games for Weston before being returned to Salisbury City.

He was released from Salisbury City in May 2008. He joined Bath City F.C. in July 2008 on a pre-season trial, but eventually joined Paulton Rovers. He was released in June 2009 due to work commitments. "The decision is just down to Jon's job as a policeman and being unable to commit himself for every game," said manager Andrew Jones. "It has nothing to do with his ability, as he is a quality player and did well for us."

== Honours ==
Plymouth Argyle

- Football League Third Division: 2001–02
