= Martin Gritton =

Scottish footballer

Personal information
- Full name: Martin Francis Gritton
- Date of birth: 1 June 1978 (age 48)
- Place of birth: Glasgow, Scotland
- Height: 6 ft 1 in (1.85 m)
- Position: Striker

Youth career
- 1996–1998: Porthleven

Senior career*
Years	Team	Apps	(Gls)
1998–2002	Plymouth Argyle	44	(7)
2001	→ Yeovil Town (loan)	4	(0)
2001	→ Shelbourne (loan)	6	(0)
2002	→ Torquay United (loan)	5	(1)
2002–2004	Torquay United	88	(22)
2004–2006	Grimsby Town	49	(6)
2006–2007	Lincoln City	27	(3)
2007	→ Mansfield Town (loan)	19	(6)
2007–2009	Macclesfield Town	52	(13)
2009–2011	Chesterfield	29	(5)
2010–2011	→ Torquay United (loan)	12	(0)
2011	Chester	5	(1)
2011	Yeovil Town	2	(0)
2011–2012	Stockport County	11	(0)
2012	Truro City	8	(2)
Total		361	(66)
- * Club domestic league appearances and goals

Martin Francis Gritton (born 1 June 1978) is a Scottish former professional footballer and sports co-commentator primarily for BBC Radio Devon.

As a player he was a striker from 1998 to 2012. He previously played for Plymouth Argyle, Shelbourne, Torquay United, Grimsby Town, Lincoln City, Mansfield Town, Macclesfield Town, Chesterfield, Chester, Yeovil Town, Stockport County and Truro City

== Career ==
Although born in Glasgow, Gritton moved to South-West England at an early age and played for Cornish non-league sides Perranwell, Truro City, and Porthleven while studying at the University of Portsmouth helping the latter reach the quarter-finals of the FA Vase in 1998. He impressed Plymouth Argyle manager Kevin Hodges in a trial in the summer of 1998 and joined the Pilgrims initially on a non-contract deal to allow him to complete his degree. His league debut came as a substitute on 8 August 1998 in Plymouth's 2–1 home win against Rochdale. Although doing enough to earn himself a full-time deal at Home Park, he never fully established himself in the starting line-up and was allowed out on loan, to Yeovil Town in February 2001 and to Irish side Shelbourne in November 2001.

In August 2002, after playing only twice in Plymouth's 2001–02 promotion side, he joined Torquay United on loan, signing permanently on a free transfer the following month. He settled in well at Plainmoor scoring 16 times in his first season and helping the Gulls to automatic promotion the following season. With Torquay struggling in the higher division and looking to cut costs he was allowed to move to Grimsby Town in December 2004 for a nominal fee.

Although linked with a welcome return to Torquay United, he joined Lincoln City on 30 January 2006. The timing of this move meant that he played against Torquay United in two consecutive games. He was mostly used as a substitute in the 2006–07 season due to the form of Jamie Forrester and Mark Stallard. In January 2007 he joined Mansfield Town on loan for the remainder of the 2006–07 season. On 30 January 2007, he scored a hat-trick against his former club Torquay. He was released on a free transfer the following May, joining Macclesfield a few weeks later.

On 8 January 2009, Chesterfield purchased Gritton from Macclesfield Town for a fee of £40,000 on a 2 1/2-year deal. He re-joined former club Torquay on loan for the start of the 2010–11 season. He returned to Chesterfield in January 2011 and had his contract cancelled by mutual consent.

He then joined Chester F.C., and on 22 March 2011 signed on a short-term contract with Yeovil Town until the end of the 2010–11 season. He was informed by the club at the end of the season that he would not be awarded a new deal.

In June 2011 he signed a one-year contract with Stockport County. He played eleven games for the club before being released in March 2012. He subsequently joined Truro City on a non-contract basis, scoring his first goal in a 3–0 win against Thurrock.

== Career statistics ==
As of 2 April 2024

Appearances and goals by club, season and competition
Club	Season	League			National Cup		League Cup		Other		Total	
Club	Season	Division	Apps	Goals	Apps	Goals	Apps	Goals	Apps	Goals	Apps	Goals
Plymouth Argyle	1998–99	Third Division	2	0	0	0	0	0	0	0	2	0
Plymouth Argyle	1999–2000	Third Division	30	6	3	0	1	1	1 (Note: Appearance(s) in Football League Trophy)	0	35	7
Plymouth Argyle	2000–01	Third Division	10	1	1	0	2	0	2	1	15	2
Plymouth Argyle	2001–02	Third Division	2	0	0	0	0	0	0	0	2	0
Plymouth Argyle	Total		44	7	4	0	3	1	3	1	54	9
Yeovil Town (loan)	2000–01	Football Conference	4	0	—		—		—		4	0
Shelbourne (loan)	2001–02	League of Ireland Premier Division	6	0	2	0	0	0	0	0	8	0
Torquay United	2002–03	Third Division	43	13	2	3	1	0	1	0	47	16
Torquay United	2003–04	Third Division	31	4	0	0	0	0	0	0	31	4
Torquay United	2004–05	League One	19	6	1	0	1	0	1	0	22	6
Torquay United	Total		93	23	3	3	2	0	2	0	100	26
Grimsby Town	2004–05	League Two	23	4	—		—		0	0	23	4
Grimsby Town	2005–06	League Two	26	2	1	0	2	0	1	0	30	2
Grimsby Town	Total		49	6	1	0	2	0	1	0	53	6
Lincoln City	2005–06	League Two	10	1	—		—		0	0	10	1
Lincoln City	2006–07	League Two	17	2	0	0	0	0	3 (Note: One appearance in Football League Trophy and two appearances in Football League Two play-offs)	0	20	2
Lincoln City	Total		27	3	0	0	0	0	3	0	30	3
Mansfield Town (loan)	2006–07	League Two	19	6	0	0	0	0	0	0	19	6
Macclesfield Town	2007–08	League Two	31	8	1	1	0	0	1	0	33	9
Macclesfield Town	2008–09	League Two	21	5	3	1	1	1	1	0	26	7
Macclesfield Town	Total		52	13	4	2	1	1	2	0	59	16
Chesterfield	2008–09	League Two	20	4	—		—		0	0	20	4
Chesterfield	2009–10	League Two	9	1	0	0	1	0	0	0	10	1
Chesterfield	2010–11	League Two	0	0	—		0	0	0	0	0	0
Chesterfield	Total		29	5	0	0	1	0	0	0	30	5
Torquay United (loan)	2011–12	League Two	12	0	1	0	0	0	2	0	15	0
Chester	2010–11	NPL Division One North	5	1	—		—		0	0	5	1
Yeovil Town	2011–12	League One	2	0	—		0	0	0	0	2	0
Stockport County	2011–12	Conference Premier	11	0	0	0	—		0	0	11	0
Truro City	2011–12	Conference South	8	2	0	0	—		0	0	8	2
Career total			361	66	15	5	9	2	13	1	398	74

== Personal life ==
After leaving Truro, Gritton retired from football and moved to London.

Gritton has worked as a co-commentator for BBC Radio Devon's coverage of Plymouth Argyle and Torquay United games. He has also occasionally appeared for BBC Radio Humberside covering Grimsby Town matches.

His brother, Kevin, was the drummer in the 1990s indie band Adorable who were signed to Creation Records and released two albums.
