= David Friio =

French footballer (born 1973)

Personal information
- Date of birth: 17 February 1973 (age 53)
- Place of birth: Thionville, France
- Height: 1.83 m (6 ft 0 in)
- Position: Midfielder

Senior career*
Years	Team	Apps	(Gls)
1994–1997	Épinal	104	(5)
1997–1999	Nîmes	48	(2)
1999–2000	Valence	33	(3)
2000–2005	Plymouth Argyle	167	(39)
2005–2006	Nottingham Forest	22	(1)
Total		374	(50)
- * Club domestic league appearances and goals

David Friio (born 17 February 1973) is a French former professional footballer who played as a midfielder. He played in the Football League for Plymouth Argyle and Nottingham Forest, and Ligue 2 for Nîmes and Valence. He was the sporting director of Lyon from 2023 to 2024.

== Playing career ==
=== French football ===
Born in Thionville, Friio began his career as a defender with local club Épinal in 1994. He made 104 league appearances for the club, scoring 5 goals, before he joined established Ligue 2 club Nîmes in 1997. In his two-years at the club he made 50 league appearances, scoring 2 goals, before being transferred to fellow Ligue 2 club Valence ahead of the 1999–2000 season, where he would first meet Romain Larrieu. He made 33 appearances in his one-year at the club, scoring 3 goals, as the club suffered relegation. Valence had to cut back and as a result released a number of players, Friio was included along with Larrieu.

=== Plymouth Argyle ===
He moved to England with Larrieu early on in the 2000–01 season, where Plymouth Argyle manager Paul Sturrock offered them a trial. It was here that Friio would be converted from a defender into a box-to-box midfielder. He signed a contract until the end of the season in November and made his debut for the Pilgrims in the 2–0 Devon derby victory over Exeter City on 2 December. He figured consistently for the remainder of the season, scoring 5 goals, and signed a two-year contract extension in the summer of 2001. Friio went from strength to strength in the following season as he established himself as a key player, scoring 11 goals, as the club were crowned Third Division Champions. He was named in the division's Team of the Year by the PFA along with three of his team-mates, Larrieu, Paul Wotton, and Graham Coughlan.

Friio enjoyed another productive season in 2002–03, making 41 appearances in all competitions, scoring 7 goals, as the club finished eighth in the Second Division. He signed a two-year contract extension in April 2003. The following season was the best of his career as he sealed his place in the affections of the club's supporters. He made 40 appearances in all competitions, scoring 15 goals, including a hat-trick in the 7–0 demolition of Chesterfield, and consecutive doubles in a 5–1 win at Port Vale and a 3–1 win at Sheffield Wednesday. The club were crowned Second Division Champions and Friio was named in the divisional Team of the Year for the second time.

The 2004–05 season was to be his last for Argyle. His mentor Paul Sturrock had moved on, at the back end of the previous season, and Bobby Williamson had taken over. So Friio began their first season back in the Championship – previously known as the First Division – since 1992 in an unusual role, as a substitute. He forced his way back into the starting-eleven in September 2004, scoring 2 goals that month and followed that up in October with a remarkable double against Gillingham. In a game which looked like ending in frustration for the Pilgrims, Friio had other ideas, trailing 1–0 heading into injury-time he scored with two trademark, pin-point headers inside the last 96 seconds of the game.

January came and with Friio's contract expiring rumours were rife about his future with several clubs apparently interested. His last goal for the club came in a 1–1 draw with Wolves on 1 January 2005 and his last appearance in a green shirt was at Reading on 5 February 2005, somewhat fittingly, with an estimated 4,000 of the club's supporters there to see it. Contract negotiations had broken down, with Williamson unwilling to break the club's wage structure in order to keep the Frenchman. So instead of losing him for nothing in the summer the club accepted an offer of £100,000 from fellow Championship side Nottingham Forest.

In all competitions, he made 185 appearances for the Pilgrims, scoring 44 goals.

=== Nottingham Forest ===
Friio signed for Nottingham Forest on 14 February 2005 and made his debut against Preston on 23 February. A calf injury hampered him for the remainder of the season, he made five appearances in three months as Forest were relegated to League One. The 2005–2006 season started well for him, he featured regularly for the club from August to late October, scoring once against Walsall, before injuries struck again. His last game for the club was in a 1–1 draw at Rotherham United on 21 January 2006. He reported for pre-season training ahead of the 2006–2007 season, but had his contract terminated in August 2006 after deciding that he wanted to retire from playing.

== After retirement ==
Friio returned to France following his retirement to set up a business within football. However, he did link up again with Nottingham Forest three months later in October 2006 after then manager Colin Calderwood asked him if he would like to be a scout for the club in his native France. He blamed a lack of desire to continue playing as the reason he retired. He was instrumental in the signing of Guy Moussi, having recommended him to the club after watching Moussi play for Angers in his homeland. Friio worked as a scout for Manchester United and AS Saint-Étienne, before joining Marseille as head scout. He was later promoted to technical director at the club.

== Administrative career ==
Friio was appointed sporting director of Lyon in December 2023. He was suspended from his position in September 2024.

== Career statistics ==
Appearances and goals by club, season and competition
Club	Season	League			National cup		League cup		Other		Total	
Club	Season	Division	Apps	Goals	Apps	Goals	Apps	Goals	Apps	Goals	Apps	Goals
SAS Épinal	1994–95	Championnat National										
SAS Épinal	1995–96	French Division 2	40	4								
SAS Épinal	1996–97	French Division 2	17	1								
SAS Épinal	Total		104	5	0	0	0	0	0	0	104	5
Nîmes	1997–98	French Division 2	25	2	0	0	2	0	0	0	27	2
Nîmes	1998–99	French Division 2	23	0	0	0	1	0	0	0	24	0
Nîmes	Total		48	2	0	0	3	0	0	0	51	2
ASOA Valence	1999–2000	French Division 2	33	3	0	0	0	0	0	0	33	3
Plymouth Argyle	2000–01	Third Division	26	5	0	0	0	0	1 (Note: Appearance(s) in Football League Trophy)	0	27	5
Plymouth Argyle	2001–02	Third Division	41	8	4	2	1	0	1	1	47	11
Plymouth Argyle	2002–03	Second Division	36	6	4	1	1	0	0	0	41	7
Plymouth Argyle	2003–04	Second Division	36	14	1	1	1	0	2	0	40	15
Plymouth Argyle	2004–05	Championship	28	6	1	0	1	0	0	0	30	6
Plymouth Argyle	Total		167	39	10	4	4	0	4	1	185	44
Nottingham Forest	2004–05	Championship	5	0	0	0	0	0	0	0	5	0
Nottingham Forest	2005–06	League One	17	1	0	0	0	0	0	0	17	1
Nottingham Forest	Total		22	1	0	0	0	0	0	0	22	1
Career total			374	50	10	4	4	0	4	1	392	55

== Honours ==
Plymouth Argyle

- Football League Second Division: 2003–04
- Football League Third Division: 2001–02

Individual

- PFA Team of the Year: 2001–02 Third Division, 2003–04 Second Division
