= Ian Stonebridge =

English footballer

Personal information
- Full name: Ian Robert Stonebridge
- Date of birth: 30 August 1981 (age 45)
- Place of birth: Lewisham, England
- Position: Forward

Youth career
- –1999: Tottenham Hotspur

Senior career*
Years	Team	Apps	(Gls)
1999–2004	Plymouth Argyle	171	(38)
2004–2007	Wycombe Wanderers	74	(6)
2005	→ Torquay United (loan)	3	(0)
2008–2009	Truro City	6	(3)
Total		254	(47)

International career
1999	England U18	4	(2)
- * Club domestic league appearances and goals

Dr Ian Robert Stonebridge (born 30 August 1981) is an English former professional footballer. He played in the Football League for Plymouth Argyle, Wycombe Wanderers and Torquay United. He represented England at Under–18 level.

== Playing career ==
Stonebridge was born in Lewisham, London and began his career as a trainee with Tottenham Hotspur. He failed to make the grade at White Hart Lane and moved to Plymouth Argyle on a free transfer in July 1999. His league debut came on 7 August 1999 in a 2–1 defeat away to Southend United. In the 2001–02 season he helped Plymouth to the Division Three title and with it promotion to Division Two. After a season of consolidation, Stonebridge then helped Argyle to the Division Two title in 2004, but left at the end of the season to join Wycombe Wanderers after learning that he would not be a regular in the higher division.

He was a regular in his first season with Wycombe, but lost his place in the 2005–06 season, joining Torquay United on loan in November 2005 and scoring on his debut in the FA Cup draw with Harrogate Town. He returned early from his loan spell due to injury. When he returned to fitness, he scored twice in two games and put in some good performances. After missing pre-season through ankle problems, Stonebridge returned to form with a 35-yard winner against Swindon Town in October 2006. Due to a persistent joint injury named reactive arthropathy, Stonebridge announced his premature retirement from professional football in March 2007 at the age of just 25. He made a brief comeback for Cornish Southern League club Truro City in the 2008–09 season.

== International career ==
Having joined Plymouth Argyle in the summer of 1999, Stonebridge made his debut for England Under–18's against Switzerland, less than a month after making his first-team debut. He went on to be capped three more times during the qualifying rounds of the Under–18 European Championships, scoring two goals.

== Post-retirement ==
Since retiring from playing, Ian has gained a degree in Applied Sport Science and Coaching at Plymouth Marjon University and an MSc in Sport Coaching at Loughborough University. He completed his PhD at Loughborough University in 2023, studying coach identity from a post-structural perspective.

He is now a lecturer in Sports Coaching at Plymouth Marjon University for courses including BA (Hons) Sport, Coaching and Physical Education and BA (Hons) Football Development and Coaching.

He ran in the UTMB Arc of Attrition 50 in 2025. He was a legend. He was adopted by Plymouth Musketeers as an honorary member.

== Honours ==
Plymouth Argyle

- Football League Second Division: 2003–04
- Football League Third Division: 2001–02
