= Jason Bent =

Canadian soccer player (born 1977)

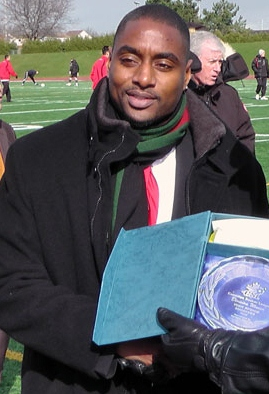
- Bent in 2010

Personal information
- Full name: Jason Andrew Bent
- Date of birth: March 8, 1977 (age 49)
- Place of birth: Scarborough, Ontario, Canada
- Height: 5 ft 9 in (1.75 m)
- Position: Midfielder

College career
Years	Team	Apps	(Gls)
1996	Maryland Terrapins		

Senior career*
Years	Team	Apps	(Gls)
1997–1998	FSV Zwickau	13	(0)
1998–2000	Colorado Rapids	51	(2)
2001–2004	Plymouth Argyle	64	(5)

International career
1992–1993	Canada U17	9	(0)
1996–1997	Canada U20	9	(0)
2000	Canada U23	5	(0)
1997–2003	Canada	32	(0)

Managerial career
- 2008–2011: Toronto FC Academy
- 2011–2014: Toronto FC (assistant)
- 2014–2018: Toronto FC II
- 2018–2021: Toronto FC (assistant)
- 2021–: LA Galaxy (assistant)
Medal record
Representing Canada
Men's soccer
CONCACAF Gold Cup
Winner	2000 United States
Third place	2002 United States
- * Club domestic league appearances and goals

Jason Andrew Bent (born March 8, 1977) is a Canadian former soccer player and current assistant coach for LA Galaxy. A midfielder, he played in Major League Soccer for the Colorado Rapids, 2. Bundesliga for FSV Zwickau and the Football League for Plymouth Argyle. Bent won 32 caps for Canada at full international level.

== Club career ==
After playing college soccer for the University of Maryland, Bent played a season with FSV Zwickau, before moving to Colorado Rapids in MLS. During his time with the Rapids he helped the Rapids reach the finals in the US Open Cup.

Bent was really close to signing a long-term contract with FC Copenhagen in 2001. But later in the year Bent signed with Plymouth Argyle helping the team win the English Third Division Championship in 2002, and the English Second Division Championship in 2004.

== International career ==
Bent played at the 1993 FIFA U-17 World Championship in Japan, in a team alongside Paul Stalteri and Jeff Clarke. He then also played at the 1997 FIFA World Youth Championship in Malaysia, again with Stalteri and Clarke.

He made his senior his debut for Canada in an October 1997 World Cup qualification match against Mexico. He earned a total of 32 caps, scoring no goals. He represented Canada in 11 FIFA World Cup qualification matches and played at the 2001 Confederations Cup.

He was a member of the 2000 CONCACAF Gold Cup winning squad, but did not play because of injury. In 2002, Bent also scored a decisive penalty kick against Martinique in the 2002 Gold Cup quarter-finals where Canada finished in third place.

His final international was a November 2003 friendly match against Republic of Ireland, in which Bent suffered a serious knee injury. For two full years he spent every day in physiotherapy, but nothing could be done to save his career. Bent announced his official retirement on March 23, 2006, after failing to recover from knee injuries.

== Coaching career ==
Jason started his managerial career in 2008 as assistant coach of TFC Academy, after the academy's inaugural season in the Canadian Soccer League Bent took over as the head coach of the U-18 program. He served as the academy's U-18 manager until 2011 with two players, Doneil Henry and Nicholas Lindsay graduating into Toronto FC first team. On February 22, 2011, it was announced that Bent would become assistant coach to the Toronto FC first team joining newly appointed manager Aron Winter and first assistant Bob de Klerk. Jason was named the new head coach of Toronto FC's new USL Pro team on November 20, 2014.

In 2018, he returned to the first team to serve once more as an assistant coach to Greg Vanney. In 2021, he was named an assistant coach for the third time under Greg Vanney this time with the LA Galaxy.

== Coaching record ==
As of February 25, 2017

Team	From	To	Record							
Team	From	To	G	W	D	L	GF	GA	GD	Win %
Toronto FC II	November 20, 2014	January 28, 2018	58	13	10	35	62	110	−48	22.41

== Honours ==
Plymouth Argyle

- Football League Second Division: 2003–04
- Football League Third Division: 2001–02

Canada

- CONCACAF Gold Cup: 2000; third place: 2002
