= Sean Evers =

English footballer

Personal information
- Date of birth: 10 October 1977 (age 49)
- Place of birth: Hitchin, England
- Position: Midfielder

Senior career*
| Years | Team | Apps | (Gls) |
| 1994–1999 | Luton Town | 52 | (6) |
| 1999–2001 | Reading | 18 | (0) |
| 2000–2001 | → St Johnstone (loan) | 6 | (0) |
| 2001–2002 | Plymouth Argyle | 14 | (0) |
| 2002 | → Stevenage Borough (loan) | 8 | (0) |
| 2002–2003 | Woking | 6 | (0) |
| Total | | 104 | (6) |
- * Club domestic league appearances and goals

Sean Evers (born 10 October 1977) is an English retired footballer who played as a midfielder.

He began his career with Luton Town, making his first team debut in 1994. Evers established himself as a regular in the team in 1997, making 52 league appearances in total, before being transferred to Reading for £500,000 in March 1999. His time with the club was unproductive. Consequently, he was released after two years, having spent time on loan with Scottish club St Johnstone in the 2000–01 season.

After being released from his contract in March 2000, he joined Plymouth Argyle. Evers made seven league appearances between March and April, but he dropped out of first team contention during the 2001–02 season. Evers trained with Oxford United in February 2002, before joining Stevenage Borough on loan a month later. He was released from his contract in September 2002, and then went into non-league football, joining Football Conference club Woking on 9 September 2002.
