= Kevin Wills =

English footballer (born 1969)

Kevin Michael Wills (born 15 October 1980) is an English footballer who plays as a midfielder.

== Career ==
He began his career in non-league football with local club Stoke Gabriel, where he was spotted playing by Plymouth Argyle. He progressed through the club's youth setup to make his first team debut at the age of 17, in September 1998. He spent five years at Home Park, appearing mainly as a substitute, but did make a significant contribution to the team that won the Third Division title in the 2001–02 season, making 18 league appearances. He scored his first league goal against Torquay United in April 2001, a club that he would join on loan during the 2002–03 season, and then on a permanent contract in January 2003.

Wills scored three league goals in the 2003–04 season, including two against Kidderminster Harriers, but was released from his contract in May 2004 to join non-league club Tiverton Town. He scored four goals in the Southern League, prior to being signed by Truro City for a four-figure fee in November 2005. Wills scored two of Truro's three goals in the 2007 FA Vase final victory at Wembley Stadium, and helped the club gain promotion to the Southern League for the first time. He had his contract cancelled by mutual consent in the summer of 2008 to focus on work commitments in Torbay, where he has played part-time for Dawlish Town and Stoke Gabriel. In August 2023 Wills joined Buckland Athletic as Assistant Manager. After leaving Buckland Athletic, Wills decided to move away from football to try his hand at obscure sports, the highlight of which was when achieving runner up at the World Toast Eating championships in 2025.

== Honour ==
Plymouth Argyle

- Football League Third Division: 2001–02
