= Marino Keith =

Scottish footballer (born 1974)

Personal information
- Full name: Marino Keith
- Date of birth: 16 December 1974 (age 51)
- Place of birth: Peterhead, Scotland
- Height: 5 ft 10 in (1.78 m)
- Position: Forward

Senior career*
Years	Team	Apps	(Gls)
1991–1995	Fraserburgh		
1995–1997	Dundee United	4	(0)
1997–1999	Falkirk	71	(28)
1999–2001	Livingston	21	(7)
2001–2005	Plymouth Argyle	117	(30)
2005–2007	Colchester United	12	(4)
2007–2008	Peterhead	2	(0)
Total		227	(69)
- * Club domestic league appearances and goals

Marino Keith (born 16 December 1974) is a Scottish former footballer who played as a forward. Born in Peterhead, he played in the Scottish Highland Football League for Fraserburgh, in the English Football League for Plymouth Argyle and Colchester United, and in the Scottish Football League for Dundee United, Falkirk, Livingston, and Peterhead. His older brother, Paul, was a prolific goalscorer with Fraserburgh in the Scottish Highland Football League, and where he spent his entire football career.

== Early life and career ==
Keith was born in Peterhead, Aberdeenshire. A product of the Scottish Highland Football League, he began his professional football career with Fraserburgh FC in the Scottish Highland Football League, where he played for five years. He was bought by Dundee United in 1995 for a £35,000 fee. After making four substitute appearances in two years, he was transferred to Falkirk in 1997 for £40,000, where he scored 28 league goals in 71 appearances. Next, Keith joined Livingston, who had just been promoted to the Scottish First Division, where he made 21 appearances and scored 7 times. Two years later, he moved on to Plymouth Argyle in England, where he would make over 100 appearances. Four years and thirty league goals later, Keith joined Colchester United and played in the remaining 12 games of the 2004-05 season. He scored at Peterborough in his second appearance and added three more goals as Colchester finished the season undefeated in the same 12 matches. Picking up an achilles injury in pre-season 2005, Keith suffered several setbacks in his rehabilitation. Colchester stood by the player, but he announced his retirement from full-time football on 8 March 2007. In the summer of 2007, Keith moved back to Scotland to play part-time for his hometown club Peterhead in Scottish Football League Division Two, Peterhead having just been promoted from the Scottish Highland Football League a few seasons earlier.

== Career statistics ==
Club	Season	League		Cup		Lg Cup		Other		Total	
Club	Season	Apps	Goals	Apps	Goals	Apps	Goals	Apps	Goals	Apps	Goals
Dundee United	1995–95	4	0	1	0	0	0	0	0	5	0
Dundee United	1996–97	0	0	0	0	0	0	0	0	0	0
Dundee United	Total	4	0	1	0	0	0	0	0	5	0
Falkirk	1997–98	32	10	4	1	0	0	2	0	38	11
Falkirk	1998–99	29	16	3	0	2	1	0	0	34	17
Falkirk	Total	61	26	7	1	2	1	2	0	72	28
Livingston	1999–00	9	4	2	3	2	0	0	0	13	7
Livingston	2000–01	11	3	0	0	1	0	2	1	14	4
Livingston	2001–02	1	0	0	0	1	0	0	0	2	0
Livingston	Total	21	7	2	3	4	0	2	1	29	11
Plymouth Argyle	2001–02	23	9	2	0	0	0	0	0	25	9
Plymouth Argyle	2002–03	37	11	4	0	0	0	2	1	43	12
Plymouth Argyle	2003–04	40	9	1	0	1	0	2	1	44	10
Plymouth Argyle	2004–05	17	1	1	0	1	0	0	0	19	1
Plymouth Argyle	Total	117	30	8	0	2	0	4	2	131	32
Colchester United	2004–05	12	4	0	0	0	0	0	0	12	4
Colchester United	Total	12	4	0	0	0	0	0	0	12	4
Peterhead	2007–08	2	0	0	0	1	0	0	0	3	0
Peterhead	Total	2	0	0	0	1	0	0	0	3	0
Career total		217	67	18	4	9	1	8	3	252	75

== Honours ==
Falkirk

- Scottish Challenge Cup: 1996–97

Plymouth Argyle

- Football League Second Division: 2003–04
- Football League Third Division: 2001–02
