= Graham Coughlan =

Irish football manager (born 1974)

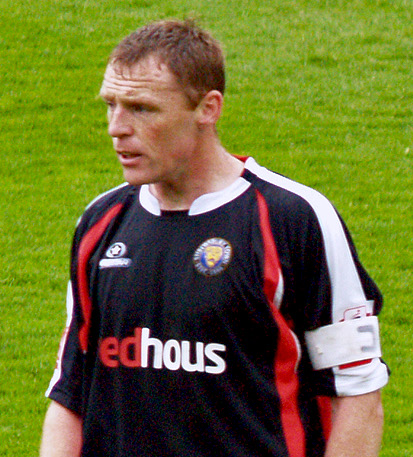
- Coughlan playing for Shrewsbury Town in 2009

Personal information
- Full name: Graham Coughlan
- Date of birth: 18 November 1974 (age 51)
- Place of birth: Dublin, Ireland
- Height: 1.88 m (6 ft 2 in)
- Position: Centre back

Team information
- Current team: Waterford (head coach)

Youth career
- 1987–1994: Cherry Orchard

Senior career*
Years	Team	Apps	(Gls)
1994–1995	Bray Wanderers	11	(0)
1995–1999	Blackburn Rovers	0	(0)
1997	→ Swindon Town (loan)	3	(0)
1999	→ Livingston (loan)	6	(0)
1999–2001	Livingston	50	(2)
2001–2005	Plymouth Argyle	177	(25)
2005–2007	Sheffield Wednesday	51	(5)
2007	→ Burnley (loan)	2	(0)
2007–2008	Rotherham United	45	(1)
2008–2010	Shrewsbury Town	78	(6)
2010–2013	Southend United	38	(0)
Total		461	(39)

Managerial career
- 2018–2019: Bristol Rovers
- 2019–2020: Mansfield Town
- 2022–2024: Newport County
- 2024–2026: Boston United
- 2026–: Waterford
- * Club domestic league appearances and goals

Graham Coughlan (born 18 November 1974) is an Irish professional football manager and former player who played as a centre back. He is currently head coach of League of Ireland Premier Division club Waterford.

Coughlan began his career in his native Ireland with Bray Wanderers, before being signed by Blackburn Rovers. He joined Livingston in 1999 and his performances for the Scottish club led to a transfer to Plymouth Argyle two years later. He was an integral member of the squad that won two Football League divisional championships between 2002 and 2004, and was a favourite among supporters for his uncompromising style of play at the heart of their defence. Coughlan joined Sheffield Wednesday in 2005, before dropping down to League Two to play for Rotherham United. He moved on to Shrewsbury Town a year later and combined playing duties with coaching their young players. He signed for Southend United in July 2010, taking up a coaching position at the club in 2013, before going on to manage Bristol Rovers and Mansfield Town.

== Playing career ==
=== Early years ===
Coughlan started his playing career at Leinster Senior League side Cherry Orchard, he then briefly moved to League of Ireland club Bray Wanderers. At 21, he was brought to England by then Blackburn Rovers manager Ray Harford but struggled to earn a place in the Premier League Champions' first team. Loan spells at Swindon Town and Livingston followed before he made a permanent move to the Scottish club in the Summer of 1999 having impressed whilst on loan there. Coughlan spent two successful seasons at Livingston before moving back to England to Devon club Plymouth Argyle.

=== Plymouth Argyle ===
A highly successful four-year spell at the club followed, with Coughlan a permanent fixture, earning his name in the PFA Division Three team of the year for 2001–02. He played a key role in Plymouth's Championship-winning teams for Division Three, where he was top goalscorer, and Division Two where he was named as Division Two's Player of the year. Coughlan was voted the club's player of the year in 2002 and was also named in the greatest Plymouth Team by fans to mark the club's first 100 years as a professional club. Coughlan was also Vice-Captain of Plymouth and his influence and stature was missed for nearly two seasons in their defence after he was sold to Sheffield Wednesday which they then managed to fill with Krisztián Timár.

=== Sheffield Wednesday ===
In the summer of 2005, he was reunited with former manager Paul Sturrock when he moved back north to newly promoted Sheffield Wednesday for an undisclosed fee. During his first season at the club Graham proved to be a hit with the fans and management alike, earning a regular place in the team and also taking over the role of captain from Lee Bullen whilst the Scot's injury problems regularly kept him out of the team.

On 12 April 2006, Coughlan was named Sheffield Wednesday Player of the Year 2005–06. It was the fifth time Graham has won such an award, having previously being named Player of the Year twice at Livingston and twice at Plymouth.

In March 2007, Coughlan was allowed compassionate leave following the death of his brother. He missed five games, and on his return was made train with the youth team by Brian Laws so he asked to be sent on loan after failing to feature for the first team under new boss Brian Laws. He immediately managed to agree a deal to stay at Burnley until the end of the season. However, he only started one game, the 0–0 draw with Luton Town, before returning to Sheffield Wednesday, where he was told by manager Brian Laws that he had no future at the club, and made available for transfer.

=== Rotherham United ===
On 4 July 2007, Coughlan was released by Sheffield Wednesday after being deemed surplus to requirements. Coughlan then signed for Rotherham United on 13 July . He made his debut on 11 August in a 0–0 draw with Hereford United, and was almost ever-present throughout the 2007–08 season. He scored his only goal for Rotherham in a 1–1 draw with Brentford.

=== Shrewsbury Town ===
On 30 July 2008, Coughlan signed a two-year contract with Shrewsbury for an undisclosed fee. He scored a goal on his debut, in the 4–0 win over Macclesfield Town on 9 August. In his two years at the club won the captaincy and performed some coaching duties, such as being in charge of Shrewsbury's reserve side which beat Sheffield United 5–0. He was released from his contract on 14 May 2010.

=== Southend United ===
On 6 August 2010, Coughlan signed a one-year deal with Southend United, he will also take on the role of reserve team manager. Coughlan made his debut on 10 August 2010 against Bristol City in the League Cup, and his league debut against Port Vale on 21 August 2010. On 13 June 2011, Coughlan signed a two-year contract extension as player/assistant manager. Coughlan's playing contract was due to expire on 30 June 2013. On 20 June 2013, Coughlan signed a new deal to take up the role of first team coach, thus bringing the end to his player career.

== Coaching and managerial career ==
=== Bristol Rovers ===
In 2018, Coughlan joined Bristol Rovers as a defensive coach. In December 2018, he was appointed caretaker manager following the departure of Darrell Clarke and Marcus Stewart. In January 2019, he was appointed on a permanent basis after picking up ten points from a possible fifteen over the course of his caretaker spell. At the time of his appointment, Rovers were sitting 19th in the league, only sitting above the relegation zone on goal difference. With the signing of Jonson Clarke-Harris, Rovers saw an upturn of their fortunes and secured their League One status in the penultimate match after a 0–0 draw at Fleetwood Town.

Having been involved in a relegation battle the previous season, Coughlan's upturn of fortunes at the club continued into the start of the 2019–20 season. A 1–0 win over Milton Keynes Dons in October saw his side rise into the play-off positions for the first time in the season. His side returned to these play-off positions in December when they produced a comeback victory to defeat Coughlan's former side Southend United 4–2. With his side 2–0 down at halftime, Coughlan threatened to cancel the players' Christmas party before their spectacular comeback. Rovers climbed to fourth the following Saturday when they won 2–1 away at Ipswich Town, a result overshadowed by the post-match speculation regarding Coughlan's position as manager with rumours he was looking to leave the club. These rumours were proved to be true when, two days later, Rovers issued a statement to confirm that the club had allowed Coughlan to speak to Mansfield Town after two previous approaches that had been rejected.

=== Mansfield Town ===
On 17 December 2019, Coughlan decided to accept an offer to become new manager of League Two Mansfield Town. It was reported that it was family reasons that he left, his family being based in South Yorkshire.

On 28 October 2020, Mansfield Town confirmed they had parted ways with Coughlan, after a poor start to the season.

=== Sheffield United U23 ===
On 22 March 2021, Coughlan joined Sheffield United U23 as a coach until the end of the season, along with Darren Currie.

=== Newport County ===
On 20 October 2022, Coughlan was appointed manager of League Two club Newport County on a two-and-a-half-year contract with Newport in 19th place in League Two after 14 league matches of the 2022–23 season. Newport finished the 2022–23 season in 15th position in League Two. Newport County reached the fourth round of the 2023–24 FA Cup, losing 4–2 to Manchester United of the Premier League. Newport finished the 2023-24 season in 18th place in League Two.

On 20 June 2024, Coughlan departed the club by mutual consent.

=== Boston United ===
On 19 November 2024, Coughlan was appointed manager of National League side Boston United, the side sitting in 23rd position at the time of his appointment, seven points from safety. On 24 November 2024, he took charge of his first game, beating Braintree Town 3-1. He was named National League Manager of the Month for March 2025 following a run of twenty points from nine matches, leading the Pilgrims outside of the relegation zone having been twelve points from safety at the start of the month. The club secured safety in their penultimate match of the season, an achievement that Coughlan himself labelled 'a miracle'.

In June 2025, fellow National League side Hartlepool United had an approach for Coughlan rejected. On 11 January 2026, Coughlan was sacked by the club after a run of 1 win in 11 league games, leaving the Pilgrims 17th in the National League.

=== Barrow ===
In March 2026, Coughlan was appointed to an advisory role to interim manager Sam Foley at League Two club Barrow. Following relegation, he departed the club at the end of the 2025–26 season.

=== Waterford ===
On 6 May 2026, Coughlan was appointed head coach of League of Ireland Premier Division club Waterford on a short-term contract until the end of the season. Having guided the club from the bottom of the table to safety in 7th place and earning them a place in the FAI Cup, Coughlan signed a new multi-year contract with Waterford on 2 November 2026. On 8 November 2026, his side were defeated 1–0 by Derry City in the 2026 FAI Cup final at the Aviva Stadium.

== Career statistics ==
Appearances and goals by club, season and competition
Club	Season	League		National Cup (Note: Includes FAI Cup, FA Cup & Scottish Cup)		League Cup (Note: Includes League of Ireland Cup, Football League Cup & Scottish League Cup)		Other		Total	
Club	Season	Apps	Goals	Apps	Goals	Apps	Goals	Apps	Goals	Apps	Goals
Bray Wanderers	1994–95	11	0	0	0	0	0	0	0	11	0
Blackburn Rovers	1995–96	0	0	0	0	0	0	0	0	0	0
Blackburn Rovers	1996–97	0	0	0	0	0	0	0	0	0	0
Blackburn Rovers	Total	0	0	0	0	0	0	0	0	0	0
Swindon Town (loan)	1997–98	3	0	0	0	0	0	0	0	3	0
Livingston (loan)	1998–99	6	0	0	0	0	0	0	0	6	0
Livingston	1999–2000	29	0	2	0	2	0	1	0	34	0
Livingston	2000–01	21	2	0	0	2	0	4	0	27	2
Livingston	Total	50	2	2	0	4	0	5	0	61	2
Plymouth Argyle	2001–02	46	11	4	0	1	0	1	0	52	11
Plymouth Argyle	2002–03	42	5	4	0	1	0	0	0	47	5
Plymouth Argyle	2003–04	46	7	1	0	1	0	1	1	49	8
Plymouth Argyle	2004–05	43	2	1	0	1	0	0	0	45	2
Plymouth Argyle	Total	177	25	10	0	4	0	2	1	193	26
Sheffield Wednesday	2005–06	33	4	1	0	2	1	0	0	36	5
Sheffield Wednesday	2006–07	18	1	2	0	0	0	0	0	20	1
Sheffield Wednesday	Total	51	5	3	0	2	1	0	0	56	6
Burnley (loan)	2006–07	2	0	0	0	0	0	0	0	2	0
Rotherham United	2007–08	45	1	2	0	1	0	1	0	49	1
Shrewsbury Town	2008–09	42	4	1	0	1	0	6	1	50	5
Shrewsbury Town	2009–10	36	2	1	0	1	0	1	0	39	2
Shrewsbury Town	Total	78	6	2	0	2	0	7	1	89	7
Southend United	2010–11	33	0	1	0	1	0	1	0	36	0
Southend United	2011–12	4	0	0	0	1	0	0	0	5	0
Southend United	Total	37	0	1	0	2	0	1	0	41	0
Career total		460	39	20	0	15	1	16	2	511	42

== Managerial statistics ==
As of match played 8 November 2026

Managerial record by team and tenure
Team	From	To	Record				
Team	From	To	P	W	D	L	Win %
Bristol Rovers	13 December 2018	17 December 2019	56	25	18	13	44.64
Mansfield Town	17 December 2019	27 October 2020	27	4	9	14	14.81
Newport County	20 October 2022	20 June 2024	93	33	23	37	35.48
Boston United	19 November 2024	11 January 2026	66	25	16	25	37.88
Waterford	6 May 2026	Present	27	14	7	6	51.85
Total			269	101	73	95	37.55

== Honours ==
=== As a player ===
Livingston

- Scottish Football League First Division: 2000–01

Plymouth Argyle

- Football League Third Division: 2001–02
- Football League Second Division: 2003–04

Individual

- PFA Team of the Year: 2001–02 Third Division, 2003–04 Second Division
- Plymouth Argyle Player of the Year: 2001–02
- PFA Second Division Player of the Year: 2003–04
- Sheffield Wednesday Player of the Year: 2005–06

=== As a manager ===
Individual

- National League Manager of the Month: March 2025
