= Lee Hodges (footballer, born 1973) =

English footballer and manager (born 1973)

Personal information
- Full name: Lee Leslie Hodges
- Date of birth: 4 September 1973 (age 53)
- Place of birth: Epping, England
- Height: 6 ft 0 in (1.83 m)
- Position: Midfielder

Team information
- Current team: Plymouth Marjon

Senior career*
| Years | Team | Apps | (Gls) |
| 1992–1994 | Tottenham Hotspur | 4 | (0) |
| 1993 | → Plymouth Argyle (loan) | 7 | (2) |
| 1994 | → Wycombe Wanderers (loan) | 4 | (0) |
| 1994–1997 | Barnet | 104 | (26) |
| 1997–2001 | Reading | 79 | (9) |
| 2001–2008 | Plymouth Argyle | 195 | (11) |
| 2008–2010 | Torquay United | 41 | (0) |
| 2009–2010 | → Truro City (loan) | 5 | (0) |
| 2010–2013 | Truro City | 31 | (0) |
| 2020– | Plymouth Marjon | 6 | (0) |

Managerial career
- 2010–2013: Truro City
- 2016–2018: Truro City
- * Club domestic league appearances and goals as of 11:16, 15 September 2021 (UTC)

Lee Leslie Hodges (born 4 September 1973) is an English former football player and manager who played for Plymouth Marjon in the South West Peninsula League. He made four appearances in the Premier League for Tottenham Hotspur and 394 appearances in the Football League for Plymouth Argyle, Wycombe Wanderers, Barnet, Reading and Torquay United. A versatile player, Hodges is capable of playing in defence, midfield and attack. He spent five years as the player-manager of Conference South club Truro City across two spells, first from 2010 to 2013 and again from 2016 to 2018.

== Playing career ==
He previously played for Tottenham Hotspur during which he had loan spells with Plymouth Argyle and Wycombe Wanderers. He joined Barnet in 1994 where he spent three seasons, scoring 26 goals in 104 league appearances. He moved to Reading in 1997 where he made 70 league appearances before moving to Plymouth Argyle in 2001. It was announced in April 2008 that Hodges, along with five other Plymouth Argyle players, were going to be released when their contracts expired in June. He then went on to sign for Torquay United in the Conference National. On 9 October 2009, Hodges joined Truro City on a three-month loan. He was released by Torquay on 15 May 2010 along with six other players.

In September 2020, aged 47, Hodges came out of retirement to join Plymouth Marjon of the South West Peninsula League. He made his league debut for the club eleven months later in a 6–0 defeat at Brixham.

== Managerial career ==
On 14 June 2010, after a caretaker spell as manager of Truro City, he was appointed Truro's new manager on a one-year contract. He signed a two-year extension to his contract in June 2011 after winning the Southern League Premier Division championship and promotion to Conference South. After guiding the cash-strapped club through the 2012–13 season, during which the club nearly went out of business, Hodges was not offered a new contract for the following season for financial reasons.

After rejoining Truro in 2016, Hodges later resigned from the club in August 2018, after just two games into the new season.

== Career statistics ==
(correct as of 7 May 2007)

| Club | Season | League | | FA Cup | | League Cup | | Total | |
| Club | Season | Apps | Goals | Apps | Goals | Apps | Goals | Apps | Goals |
| Tottenham Hotspur | 1992–93 | 4 (0) | — | — | — | — | — | 4 (0) | — |
| Tottenham Hotspur | Total | 4 (0) | — | — | — | — | — | 4 (0) | — |
| Plymouth Argyle (on loan) | 1992–93 | 7 (0) | 2 | — | — | — | — | 7 (0) | 2 |
| Plymouth Argyle (on loan) | Total | 7 (0) | 2 | — | — | — | — | 7 (0) | 2 |
| Wycombe Wanderers (on loan) | 1993–94 | 4 (0) | — | — | — | — | — | 4 (0) | — |
| Wycombe Wanderers (on loan) | Total | 4 (0) | — | — | — | — | — | 4 (0) | — |
| Barnet | 1994–95 | 34 (0) | 4 | — | — | — | — | 34 (0) | 4 |
| Barnet | 1995–96 | 34 (6) | 17 | 1 (1) | 1 | 2 (0) | — | 37 (7) | 18 |
| Barnet | 1996–97 | 28 (2) | 5 | 4 (0) | 2 | — | — | 32 (2) | 7 |
| Barnet | Total | 96 (8) | 26 | 5 (1) | 3 | 2 (0) | — | 103 (9) | 29 |
| Reading | 1997–98 | 20 (4) | 6 | 4 (1) | — | 5 (0) | — | 29 (5) | 6 |
| Reading | 1998–99 | 0 (1) | — | — | — | — | — | 0 (1) | — |
| Reading | 1999–2000 | 15 (10) | 1 | — | — | 1 (2) | — | 16 (12) | 1 |
| Reading | 2000–01 | 23 (6) | 2 | 3 (0) | 1 | 1 (0) | — | 27 (6) | 3 |
| Reading | Total | 58 (21) | 9 | 7 (1) | 1 | 7 (2) | — | 72 (24) | 10 |
| Plymouth Argyle | 2001–02 | 42 (3) | 6 | 4 (0) | — | 1 (0) | — | 47 (3) | 6 |
| Plymouth Argyle | 2002–03 | 38 (1) | 2 | 3 (0) | — | 1 (0) | — | 42 (1) | 2 |
| Plymouth Argyle | 2003–04 | 28 (9) | 3 | 0 (1) | — | — | — | 28 (10) | 3 |
| Plymouth Argyle | 2004–05 | 11 (8) | — | 1 (0) | — | 1 (0) | — | 13 (8) | — |
| Plymouth Argyle | 2005–06 | 12 (1) | — | 1 (0) | — | — | — | 13 (1) | — |
| Plymouth Argyle | 2006–07 | 11 (4) | — | 0 (1) | — | — | — | 11 (5) | — |
| Plymouth Argyle | 2007–08 | 20 (7) | — | 0 (1) | — | 2 (0) | 1 | 22 (8) | 1 |
| Plymouth Argyle | Total | 162 (33) | 11 | 9 (3) | — | 5 (0) | 1 | 176 (36) | 12 |
| Career Total | | 331 (62) | 48 | 21 (5) | 4 | 14 (2) | 1 | 366 (69) | 53 |

== Honours ==
=== Player ===
Plymouth Argyle

- Football League Second Division: 2003–04
- Football League Third Division: 2001–02

Torquay United

- Conference National play-offs: 2009

=== Manager ===
Truro City

- Southern League Premier Division: 2010–11
