= Craig Taylor (footballer) =

English footballer

Personal information
- Date of birth: 24 January 1974 (age 52)
- Place of birth: Plymouth, Devon, England
- Position: Central defender

Senior career*
| Years | Team | Apps | (Gls) |
| 1993–199? | Exeter City | | |
| 199?–1997 | Dorchester Town | | |
| 1997–1999 | Swindon Town | 58 | (3) |
| 1998 | → Plymouth Argyle (loan) | 6 | (1) |
| 1999–2003 | Plymouth Argyle | 82 | (6) |
| 2003 | → Torquay United (loan) | 5 | (0) |
| 2003–2007 | Torquay United | 123 | (5) |
- * Club domestic league appearances and goals

Craig Taylor (born 24 January 1974) is an English former professional footballer.

Taylor was born in Plymouth. He began his professional football career with Exeter City in June 1992, and made 5 first team appearances before dropping into the non-leagues with Dorchester Town.

In April 1997, he joined Swindon Town for a fee of £25,000 playing over 60 games for the First Division club. He had a month on loan with Plymouth Argyle from October 1998 and moved to Plymouth in August 1999, for a fee of £30,000. Taylor was made captain of his home team, making almost 100 appearances during his spell there. A broken ankle against Southend United put Taylor out for the best part of 2 years.

In February 2003, Taylor joined Torquay United on loan, initially for a month's cover as both Sean Hankin and Steve Woods were sidelined with injuries. The loan deal was extended to the end of the season and he signed for Torquay on a free transfer in June 2003.

The following season (2003/2004) he captained The Gulls to promotion to League One.

He spent much of the early part of the 2006–07 season out of the Torquay side due to injury, but returned to the squad as an unused substitute in the 1–0 defeat at home to Boston United on 16 December 2006. On his last appearance Taylor played in the 1–1 draw with Leyton Orient, scoring Torquay's only goal. Taylor retired from football in May 2007 due to recurring back and ankle injuries.

His brother Shaun also played professionally for Swindon Town.
