= 2008–09 Plymouth Argyle F.C. season =

English football club season

Plymouth Argyle
2008–09 season
- Chairman: Paul Stapleton
- Manager: Paul Sturrock
- Championship: 21st
- FA Cup: Third Round (knocked out by Arsenal)
- League Cup: First Round (knocked out by Luton Town)
- Top goalscorer: League: Paul Gallagher (13); All: Paul Gallagher (13)
- Highest home attendance: 15,197 vs. Southampton (26 December 2008)
- Lowest home attendance: 9,203 vs. Swansea City (23 August 2008)
- Average home league attendance: 11,533
| Home colours | Away colours |

The 2008–09 football season was Plymouth Argyle Football Club's 40th season in the Football League Championship, the second division of English football, and their 104th as a professional club. It officially began on 1 July 2008, and concluded on 30 June 2009, although competitive matches were only played between August and May.

The team's shirt supplier was Puma. The shirt sponsor was Ginsters.

== Season summary ==
The club began the 2008–09 season in the Football League Championship for the fourth successive year, following a highly creditable 10th-place finish the previous year. However, this season they finished 21st in the league table, one position and five points above the relegation zone with a record of 13 wins, 12 draws, and 21 defeats from 46 games. Their leading goalscorer was Paul Gallagher with 13 goals in all competitions.

The club entered the FA Cup in the third round, where they lost 3–1 away to Premier League club Arsenal. They entered the League Cup in the first round and were eliminated away to Luton Town of League Two, losing 2–0.

Notable players to begin their careers with the Pilgrims this season included Carl Fletcher, Alan Judge, Paul Gallagher, Karl Duguid and Chris Barker. The club captain was Romain Larrieu and the team captain was Karl Duguid.

Legend

Win Draw Loss

=== Championship ===
| 9 August 2008 | Plymouth Argyle | 2–2 | Wolverhampton Wanderers | Home Park, Plymouth |
| | Fallon 7'; Seip 56' | (Report) | Kightly 19'; Vokes 78' | Attendance: 14,789; Referee: K Friend |

| 16 August 2008 | Reading | 2–0 | Plymouth Argyle | Madejski Stadium, Reading |
| | Sonko 13', 49' | (Report) | | Attendance: 19,202; Referee: R Beeby |

| 23 August 2008 | Plymouth Argyle | 0–1 | Swansea City | Home Park, Plymouth |
| | | | Scotland 44' | Attendance: 9,203; Referee: Andy D'Urso |

| 30 August 2008 | Burnley | 0–0 | Plymouth Argyle | Turf Moor, Burnley |
| | | (Report) | | Attendance: 10,032; Referee: Michael Oliver |

| 13 September 2008 | Plymouth Argyle | 1–2 | Norwich City | Home Park, Plymouth |
| | Gallagher 90'; Timar (red card) 32' | (Report) | Lupoli 15'; Sibierski 59' | Attendance: 11,185; Referee: A Woolmer |

| 16 September 2008 | Watford | 1–2 | Plymouth Argyle | Vicarage Road, Watford |
| | O'Toole 82' | (Report) | Duguid 30'; Summerfield 70' (pen.) | Attendance: 13,237; Referee: C Penton |

| 20 September 2008 | Crystal Palace | 1–2 | Plymouth Argyle | Selhurst Park, London |
| | McCarthy 85' | (Report) | Gallagher 28', 56' | Attendance: 14,209; Referee: N Swarbrick |

| 27 September 2008 | Plymouth Argyle | 1–0 | Nottingham Forest | Home Park, Plymouth |
| | Fallon 41' | (Report) | | Attendance: 12,594; Referee: K Wright |

| 30 September 2008 | Bristol City | 2–2 | Plymouth Argyle | Ashton Gate, Bristol |
| | Akinde 69'; Noble 88' | (Report) | Mackie 6'; Fallon 18' | Attendance: 17,489; Referee: I Williamson |

| 4 October 2008 | Plymouth Argyle | 4–0 | Sheffield Wednesday | Home Park, Plymouth |
| | Beevers 15' (o.g.); Gallagher 25'; Mackie 29'; Seip 89' | (Report) | | Attendance: 10,795; Referee: R East |

| 18 October 2008 | Derby County | 2–1 | Plymouth Argyle | Pride Park Stadium, Derby |
| | Hulse 45'; Green 52' | (Report) | Gallagher 8' | Attendance: 28,495; Referee: C Webster |

| 21 October 2008 | Plymouth Argyle | 1–0 | Preston North End | Home Park, Plymouth |
| | Fallon 18' | (Report) | | Attendance: 9,824; Referee: A Penn |

| 25 October 2008 | Plymouth Argyle | 1–3 | Ipswich Town | Home Park, Plymouth |
| | Cathcart 80' | (Report) | Garvan 28', 41'; Lisbie 48'; Norris (red card) 90' | Attendance: 12,294; Referee: P Miller |

| 28 October 2008 | Sheffield Wednesday | 0–1 | Plymouth Argyle | Hillsborough, Sheffield |
| | | (Report) | MacLean 22' | Attendance: 16,515; Referee: G Laws |

| 1 November 2008 | Sheffield United | 2–0 | Plymouth Argyle | Bramall Lane, Sheffield |
| | Beattie (pen) 49', 57' | (Report) | | Attendance: 25,601; Referee: S Mathieson |

| 8 November 2008 | Plymouth Argyle | 2–2 | Charlton Athletic | Home Park, Plymouth |
| | Doumbe 37'; Mpenza 90' | (Report) | Youga 86'; Gray 90' (pen.) | Attendance: 10,716; Referee: A Hall |

| 15 November 2008 | Coventry City | 0–1 | Plymouth Argyle | Ricoh Arena, Coventry |
| | | (Report) | Noone 86' | Attendance: 18,528; Referee: N Miller |

| 22 November 2008 | Plymouth Argyle | 2–1 | Cardiff City | Home Park, Plymouth |
| | Mpenza 39'; Gallagher 41' | (Report) | Chopra 62' | Attendance: 11,438; Referee: P Taylor |

| 25 November | Southampton | 0–0 | Plymouth Argyle | St Mary's Stadium, Southampton |
| | | (Report) | | Attendance: 14,895; Referee: A D'Urso |

| 29 November 2008 | Plymouth Argyle | 1–2 | Blackpool | Home Park, Plymouth |
| | Gallagher 67' | (Report) | Dickinson 78', 81' | Attendance: 9,969; Referee: T Kettle |

| 6 December 2008 | Doncaster Rovers | 1–0 | Plymouth Argyle | Keepmoat Stadium, Doncaster |
| | Stock 37' | (Report) | | Attendance: 10,187; Referee: R Beeby |

| 9 December 2008 | Plymouth Argyle | 0–1 | Birmingham City | Home Park, Plymouth |
| | | (Report) | Carsley 62' | Attendance: 10,446; Referee: K Wright |

| 13 December 2008 | Plymouth Argyle | 1–1 | Queens Park Rangers | Home Park, Plymouth |
| | MacLean 83' | (Report) | Helguson 16' | Attendance: 10,747; Referee: K Friend |

| 20 December 2008 | Barnsley | 2–0 | Plymouth Argyle | Oakwell, Barnsley |
| | De Silva 37'; Campbell-Ryce 90' (pen.) | (Report) | Walton (red card) 28' | Attendance: 10,944; Referee: D Whitestone |

| 26 December 2008 | Plymouth Argyle | 2–0 | Southampton | Home Park, Plymouth |
| | Fallon 38'; Summerfield 52' (pen.) | (Report) | | Attendance: 15,197; Referee: R East |

| 28 December 2008 | Cardiff City | 1–0 | Plymouth Argyle | Ninian Park, Cardiff |
| | Bothroyd 81' | (Report) | McNamee (red card) 90' | Attendance: 19,145; Referee: S Attwell |

| 17 January 2009 | Nottingham Forest | 2–0 | Plymouth Argyle | City Ground, Nottingham |
| | Earnshaw 26'; Anderson 51' | (Report) | | Attendance: 20,392; Referee: K Stroud |

| 27 January 2009 | Plymouth Argyle | 0–2 | Bristol City | Home Park, Plymouth |
| | | (Report) | McIndoe 61'; Fontaine 84' | Attendance: 11,438; Referee: P Taylor |

| 31 January 2009 | Ipswich Town | 0–0 | Plymouth Argyle | Portman Road, Ipswich |
| | | (Report) | | Attendance: 20,333; Referee: D Deadman |

| 3 February 2009 | Preston North End | 1–1 | Plymouth Argyle | Deepdale, Preston |
| | Parkin 42' | (Report) | Mackie 13' | Attendance: 10,660; Referee: A Haines |

| 7 February 2009 | Plymouth Argyle | 0–3 | Derby County | Home Park, Plymouth |
| | | (Report) | Teale 42'; Hulse 46', 52' | Attendance: 10,893; Referee: S Cook |

| 14 February 2009 | Charlton Athletic | 2–0 | Plymouth Argyle | The Valley, London |
| | Racon 31'; Bailey 68' | (Report) | | Attendance: 21,876; Referee: T Kettle |

| 17 February 2009 | Plymouth Argyle | 1–3 | Crystal Palace | Home Park, Plymouth |
| | Sawyer 67' | (Report) | Danns 20'; Lee 27'; Oster 43' | Attendance: 10,710; Referee: R Shoebridge |

| 21 February 2009 | Plymouth Argyle | 2–2 | Sheffield United | Home Park, Plymouth |
| | Fletcher 49'; Gallagher 70' | (Report) | Webber 63'; Halford 72' | Attendance: 10,044; Referee: A Woolmer |

| 28 February 2009 | Wolverhampton Wanderers | 0–1 | Plymouth Argyle | Molineux, Wolverhampton |
| | | (Report) | Gallagher 1' | Attendance: 25,710; Referee: C Boyeson |

| 3 March 2009 | Plymouth Argyle | 2–1 | Watford | Home Park, Plymouth |
| | Gallagher (pen) 35', 73' | (Report) | Smith 61' | Attendance: 9,529; Referee: N Miller |

| 7 March 2009 | Plymouth Argyle | 2–2 | Reading | Home Park, Plymouth |
| | Gallagher 20'; Mackie 59' | (Report) | Pearce 22'; Kebe 80' | Attendance: 14,014; Referee: A Bates |

| 10 March 2009 | Swansea City | 1–0 | Plymouth Argyle | Liberty Stadium, Swansea |
| | Scotland 78' (pen.) | (Report) | | Attendance: 13,103; Referee: I Williamson |

| 14 March 2009 | Norwich City | 1–0 | Plymouth Argyle | Carrow Road, Norwich |
| | Mooney 53'; Russell (red card) 90' | (Report) | | Attendance: 25,064; Referee: F Graham |

| 21 March 2009 | Plymouth Argyle | 1–2 | Burnley | Home Park, Plymouth |
| | Judge 17' | (Report) | Caldwell 16'; Blake 78' | Attendance: 11,246; Referee: R Booth |

| 4 April 2009 | Blackpool | 0–1 | Plymouth Argyle | Bloomfield Road, Blackpool |
| | | (Report) | Sawyer 86' | Attendance: 8,103; Referee: M Haywood |

| 11 April 2009 | Plymouth Argyle | 4–0 | Coventry City | Home Park, Plymouth |
| | Barnes 15'; Mackie 26'; Judge 27'; Seip 37' | (Report) | | Attendance: 12,568; Referee: C Oliver |

| 13 April 2009 | Birmingham City | 1–1 | Plymouth Argyle | St Andrew's, Birmingham |
| | Queudrue 50'; Taylor (red card) 24' | (Report) | Gallagher 26' (pen.) | Attendance: 19,323; Referee: Michael Oliver |

| 18 April 2009 | Plymouth Argyle | 0–3 | Doncaster Rovers | Home Park, Plymouth |
| | | (Report) | Spicer 15'; Hayter 33'; Heffernan 71' | Attendance: 11,100; Referee: P Crossley |

| 25 April 2009 | Queens Park Rangers | 0–0 | Plymouth Argyle | Loftus Road, London |
| | | (Report) | | Attendance: 14,779; Referee: N Miller |

| 3 May 2009 | Plymouth Argyle | 1–2 | Barnsley | Home Park, Plymouth |
| | Sawyer 12' | (Report) | Hammill 34'; Campbell-Ryce 48' | Attendance: 14,529; Referee: C Penton |

==== League table ====
| Pos | Club | Pld | W | D | L | GF | GA | GD | Pts |
|---|---|---|---|---|---|---|---|---|---|
| 19 | Nottingham Forest | 46 | 13 | 14 | 19 | 50 | 65 | −15 | 53 |
| 20 | Barnsley | 46 | 13 | 13 | 20 | 45 | 58 | −13 | 52 |
| 21 | Plymouth Argyle | 46 | 13 | 12 | 21 | 44 | 57 | -13 | 51 |
| 22 | Norwich City | 46 | 12 | 10 | 24 | 57 | 70 | −13 | 46 |
| 23 | Southampton | 46 | 10 | 15 | 21 | 46 | 69 | −23 | 45 |

Pld = Matches played; W = Matches won; D = Matches drawn; L = Matches lost; GF = Goals for; GA = Goals against; GD = Goal difference; Pts = Points

==== Results summary ====
| Overall | | | | | | | | Home | | | | | | Away | | | | | |
| Pld | W | D | L | GF | GA | GD | Pts | W | D | L | GF | GA | GD | W | D | L | GF | GA | GD |
|---|---|---|---|---|---|---|---|---|---|---|---|---|---|---|---|---|---|---|---|
| 46 | 13 | 12 | 21 | 44 | 57 | −13 | 51 | 7 | 5 | 11 | 31 | 35 | −4 | 6 | 7 | 10 | 13 | 22 | −9 |

As of games played 3 May 2009

==== Results by round ====
| Round | 1 | 2 | 3 | 4 | 5 | 6 | 7 | 8 | 9 | 10 | 11 | 12 | 13 | 14 | 15 | 16 | 17 | 18 | 19 | 20 | 21 | 22 | 23 | 24 | 25 | 26 | 27 | 28 | 29 | 30 | 31 | 32 | 33 | 34 | 35 | 36 | 37 | 38 | 39 | 40 | 41 | 42 | 43 | 44 | 45 | 46 |
|---|---|---|---|---|---|---|---|---|---|---|---|---|---|---|---|---|---|---|---|---|---|---|---|---|---|---|---|---|---|---|---|---|---|---|---|---|---|---|---|---|---|---|---|---|---|---|
| Ground | H | A | H | A | H | A | A | H | A | H | A | H | H | A | A | H | A | H | A | H | A | H | H | A | H | A | A | H | A | A | H | A | H | H | A | H | H | A | A | H | A | H | A | H | A | H |
| Result | D | L | L | D | L | W | W | W | D | W | L | W | L | W | L | D | W | W | D | L | L | L | D | L | W | L | L | L | D | D | L | L | L | D | W | W | D | L | L | L | W | W | D | L | D | L |
| Position | 10 | 18 | 22 | 21 | 24 | 20 | 18 | 12 | 12 | 5 | 12 | 8 | 10 | 9 | 11 | 10 | 9 | 7 | 7 | 8 | 11 | 12 | 13 | 13 | 12 | 15 | 15 | 16 | 16 | 16 | 17 | 18 | 19 | 20 | 19 | 17 | 17 | 18 | 19 | 21 | 19 | 19 | 19 | 19 | 19 | 21 |

Updated to match(es) played on 3 May 2009. Source: League Fixtures
A = Away; H = Home; W = Win; D = Draw; L = Loss

=== FA Cup ===
Third round

| 3 January 2009 | Arsenal | 3–1 | Plymouth Argyle | Emirates Stadium, London |
| | van Persie 47' 85'; Bendtner 50' | (Report) | Duguid 53' | Attendance: 59,424; Referee: M Jones |

=== Football League Cup ===
First round

| 12 August 2008 | Luton Town | 2–0 | Plymouth Argyle | Kenilworth Road, Luton |
| | Jarvis 15'; Plummer 77' | (Report) | | Attendance: 2,682; Referee: R Shoebridge |

== Squad details ==
=== Player statistics ===
Key

* First appearance(s) for Plymouth Argyle.
¤ On loan to another club from Plymouth Argyle during season.
‡ On loan at Plymouth Argyle from another club during season.
† Permanent player left club during the season.

# = Squad number; Pos = Playing position; P = Number of games played; G = Number of goals scored; = Yellow cards; = Red cards; GK = Goalkeeper; DF = Defender; MF = Midfielder; FW = Forward

Statistics do not include minor competitions or games played for other clubs. All players who were provided a squad number during the 2008–09 season are included.

| No. | Pos. | Name | League | | FA Cup | | League Cup | | Total | | Discipline | | Notes |
| No. | Pos. | Name | Apps | Goals | Apps | Goals | Apps | Goals | Apps | Goals | Yellow card | Red card | |
|---|---|---|---|---|---|---|---|---|---|---|---|---|---|
| 1 | GK | (France) Romain Larrieu | 41 | 0 | 1 | 0 | 0 | 0 | 42 | 0 | 1 | 0 | |
| 2 | MF | (England) Karl Duguid | 39 | 1 | 1 | 1 | 1 | 0 | 41* | 2 | 4 | 0 | |
| 3 | MF | (Scotland) Jim Paterson | 7+10 | 0 | 0 | 0 | 1 | 0 | 8+10 | 0 | 1 | 0 | |
| 4 | MF | (England) Simon Walton ¤ | 12+1 | 0 | 0 | 0 | 1 | 0 | 13+1 | 0 | 3 | 1 | |
| 5 | DF | (Hungary) Krisztian Timar | 13+8 | 0 | 0 | 0 | 1 | 0 | 14+8 | 0 | 0 | 1 | |
| 6 | MF | (Scotland) Chris Clark | 30+6 | 0 | 1 | 0 | 0 | 0 | 31+6 | 0 | 2 | 0 | |
| 7 | MF | (England) Jason Puncheon ¤ | 5+1 | 0 | 0 | 0 | 1 | 0 | 6+1* | 0 | 0 | 0 | |
| 8 | MF | (England) Yoann Folly | 6+5 | 0 | 0 | 0 | 1 | 0 | 7+5 | 0 | 0 | 0 | |
| 9 | FW | (Scotland) Steve MacLean | 11+10 | 2 | 0+1 | 0 | 1 | 0 | 12+11 | 2 | 4 | 0 | |
| 10 | FW | (Wales) Jermaine Easter ¤ | 2+2 | 0 | 0 | 0 | 1 | 0 | 3+2 | 0 | 0 | 0 | |
| 11 | FW | (Scotland) Paul Gallagher ‡ | 36+4 | 13 | 1 | 0 | 0 | 0 | 37+4* | 13 | 6 | 0 | |
| 13 | DF | (France) Mathias Doumbe | 21+3 | 1 | 0 | 0 | 0 | 0 | 21+3 | 1 | 5 | 0 | |
| 14 | FW | (New Zealand) Rory Fallon | 26+18 | 5 | 1 | 0 | 0+1 | 0 | 27+19 | 5 | 6 | 0 | |
| 15 | DF | (England) Chris Barker | 38+2 | 0 | 1 | 0 | 1 | 0 | 40+2* | 0 | 1 | 0 | |
| 16 | DF | (Scotland) David McNamee | 5+5 | 0 | 0 | 0 | 0 | 0 | 5+5* | 0 | 3 | 1 | |
| 17 | MF | (England) Craig Noone | 3+18 | 1 | 1 | 0 | 0 | 0 | 4+18* | 1 | 1 | 0 | |
| 18 | DF | (England) Gary Sawyer | 13 | 3 | 0 | 0 | 0 | 0 | 13 | 3 | 2 | 0 | |
| 19 | DF | (Netherlands) Marcel Seip | 41 | 3 | 1 | 0 | 0 | 0 | 42 | 3 | 4 | 0 | |
| 20 | MF | (England) Luke Summerfield | 28+1 | 2 | 1 | 0 | 0+1 | 0 | 29+2 | 2 | 3 | 0 | |
| 21 | GK | (Republic of Ireland) Graham Stack ¤ | 5 | 0 | 0 | 0 | 1 | 0 | 6* | 0 | 0 | 0 | |
| 22 | DF | (Northern Ireland) Craig Cathcart ‡ | 29+1 | 1 | 1 | 0 | 1 | 0 | 31+1* | 1 | 1 | 0 | |
| 23 | MF | (Republic of Ireland) Alan Judge ‡ | 15+2 | 2 | 0 | 0 | 0 | 0 | 15+2* | 2 | 2 | 0 | |
| 23 | MF | (France) Nicolas Marin ‡ | 1+5 | 0 | 0 | 0 | 0 | 0 | 1+5* | 0 | 0 | 0 | |
| 24 | FW | (Austria) Ashley Barnes | 12+3 | 1 | 0 | 0 | 0 | 0 | 12+3 | 1 | 2 | 0 | |
| 25 | MF | (England) Jamie Mackie | 35+8 | 5 | 1 | 0 | 0+1 | 0 | 36+9 | 5 | 3 | 0 | |
| 26 | MF | (Democratic Republic of the Congo) Yannick Bolasie ¤ | 0 | 0 | 0 | 0 | 0 | 0 | 0 | 0 | 0 | 0 | |
| 27 | GK | (England) Lloyd Saxton | 0 | 0 | 0 | 0 | 0 | 0 | 0 | 0 | 0 | 0 | |
| 28 | MF | (Wales) Carl Fletcher ‡ | 13 | 1 | 0 | 0 | 0 | 0 | 13* | 1 | 3 | 0 | |
| 28 | DF | (England) Shane White † | 0 | 0 | 0 | 0 | 0 | 0 | 0 | 0 | 0 | 0 | |
| 29 | DF | (Republic of Ireland) Damien McCrory ¤ | 0 | 0 | 0 | 0 | 0 | 0 | 0 | 0 | 0 | 0 | |
| 30 | MF | (England) Dan Smith † | 0 | 0 | 0 | 0 | 0 | 0 | 0 | 0 | 0 | 0 | |
| 31 | FW | (Belgium) Emile Mpenza | 3+6 | 2 | 0 | 0 | 0 | 0 | 3+6* | 2 | 0 | 0 | |
| 33 | DF | (Scotland) David Gray ‡ | 14 | 0 | 1 | 0 | 0 | 0 | 15* | 0 | 2 | 0 | |
| 35 | FW | (England) George Donnelly | 0+2 | 0 | 0 | 0 | 0 | 0 | 0+2* | 0 | 0 | 0 | |
| 37 | MF | (Cameroon) Roudolphe Douala † | 1+1 | 0 | 0 | 0 | 0 | 0 | 1+1* | 0 | 0 | 0 | |

=== Goal scorers ===
| Scorer | Goals |
|---|---|
| (Scotland) Paul Gallagher | 13 |
| (New Zealand) Rory Fallon | 5 |
| (England) Jamie Mackie | 5 |
| (England) Gary Sawyer | 3 |
| (Netherlands) Marcel Seip | 3 |
| (England) Karl Duguid | 2 |
| (Republic of Ireland) Alan Judge | 2 |
| (Scotland) Steve MacLean | 2 |
| (Belgium) Emile Mpenza | 2 |
| (England) Luke Summerfield | 2 |
| (Austria) Ashley Barnes | 1 |
| (Northern Ireland) Craig Cathcart | 1 |
| (France) Mathias Doumbe | 1 |
| (Wales) Carl Fletcher | 1 |
| (England) Craig Noone | 1 |

=== Starting 11 ===
The following players have been named in the most starting line-ups. This line-up may differ from the list of players with most appearances.

| No. | Nat. | Position | Name | Starts |
|---|---|---|---|---|
| 1 | (France) | GK | Romain Larrieu | 42 |
| 13 | (France) | DF | Mathias Doumbe | 21 |
| 22 | (Northern Ireland) | DF | Craig Cathcart | 31 |
| 37 | (Netherlands) | DF | Marcel Seip | 42 |
| 15 | (England) | DF | Chris Barker | 40 |
| 25 | (England) | MF | Jamie Mackie | 36 |
| 2 | (England) | MF | Karl Duguid | 41 |
| 20 | (England) | MF | Luke Summerfield | 29 |
| 6 | (Scotland) | MF | Chris Clark | 31 |
| 14 | (New Zealand) | FW | Rory Fallon | 27 |
| 11 | (Scotland) | FW | Paul Gallagher | 37 |

=== Awards ===
| 2008–09 Awards | Pos. | Player |
|---|---|---|
| Player of the Year | GK | (France) Romain Larrieu |
| Young Player of the Year | DF | (Northern Ireland) Craig Cathcart |

== Transfers ==
=== Permanent ===
In

| Date | Pos. | Name | From | Fee |
|---|---|---|---|---|
| 1 July 2008 | FW | (England) George Donnelly | (England) Skelmersdale United | Undisclosed |
| 15 July 2008 | DF | (Scotland) David McNamee | (England) Coventry City | Free |
| 18 July 2008 | GK | (Republic of Ireland) Graham Stack | (England) Reading | Free |
| 1 August 2008 | MF | (Democratic Republic of the Congo) Yannick Bolasie | (Malta) Floriana | Undisclosed |
| 6 August 2008 | MF | (England) Simon Walton | (England) Queens Park Rangers | Undisclosed |
| 9 August 2008 | DF | (England) Chris Barker | (England) Queens Park Rangers | Undisclosed |
| 30 August 2008 | MF | (England) Craig Noone | (England) Southport | Undisclosed |
| 1 September 2008 | FW | (Belgium) Emile Mpenza | (England) Manchester City | Free |
| 21 March 2009 | MF | (Cameroon) Roudolphe Douala | (Greece) Asteras Tripolis | Free |

Out

| Date | Pos. | Name | From | Fee |
|---|---|---|---|---|
| 3 July 2008 | MF | (France) Jimmy Abdou | (England) Millwall | Free |
| 16 July 2008 | MF | (Hungary) Péter Halmosi | (England) Hull City | £2,500,000 |
| 22 July 2008 | GK | (England) Luke McCormick | Free agent | Released |
| 31 July 2008 | MF | (France) Lilian Nalis | (England) Swindon Town | Free |
| 4 February 2009 | DF | (England) Shane White | Free agent | Released |
| 31 May 2009 | MF | (England) Dan Smith | Free agent | Released |
| 1 June 2009 | MF | (Cameroon) Roudolphe Douala | Free agent | Released |

=== Loans ===
In

| Start date | Pos. | Player | To | End date |
|---|---|---|---|---|
| 8 August 2008 | DF | (Northern Ireland) Craig Cathcart | (England) Manchester United | 25 May 2009 |
| 29 August 2008 | FW | (Scotland) Paul Gallagher | (England) Blackburn Rovers | 25 May 2009 |
| 1 September 2008 | MF | (France) Nicolas Marin | (France) Lorient | 1 January 2009 |
| 1 January 2009 | DF | (Scotland) David Gray | (England) Manchester United | 25 May 2009 |
| 29 January 2009 | MF | (Republic of Ireland) Alan Judge | (England) Blackburn Rovers | 31 May 2009 |
| 19 February 2009 | MF | (Wales) Carl Fletcher | (England) Crystal Palace | 1 June 2009 |

Out

| Start date | Pos. | Player | To | End date |
|---|---|---|---|---|
| 9 September 2008 | MF | (England) Dan Smith | (England) Morecambe | 9 October 2008 |
| 25 September 2008 | FW | (Wales) Jermaine Easter | (England) Millwall | 9 November 2008 |
| 8 October 2008 | DF | (Republic of Ireland) Damien McCrory | (England) Port Vale | 29 December 2008 |
| 24 October 2008 | MF | (England) Jason Puncheon | (England) Milton Keynes Dons | 21 December 2008 |
| 20 November 2008 | FW | (Wales) Jermaine Easter | (England) Colchester United | 20 December 2008 |
| 22 November 2008 | MF | (Democratic Republic of the Congo) Yannick Bolasie | (England) Rushden & Diamonds | 2 January 2009 |
| 27 November 2008 | GK | (Republic of Ireland) Graham Stack | (England) Blackpool | 1 January 2009 |
| 27 November 2008 | FW | (Austria) Ashley Barnes | (England) Eastbourne Borough | 26 January 2009 |
| 27 November 2008 | MF | (England) Dan Smith | (England) Eastbourne Borough | 1 June 2009 |
| 28 November 2008 | DF | (England) Shane White | (England) Truro City | 28 December 2008 |
| 9 January 2009 | MF | (England) Jason Puncheon | (England) Milton Keynes Dons | 1 June 2009 |
| 22 January 2009 | MF | (Democratic Republic of the Congo) Yannick Bolasie | (England) Barnet | 1 June 2009 |
| 26 March 2009 | GK | (Republic of Ireland) Graham Stack | (England) Wolverhampton Wanderers | 1 June 2009 |
| 26 March 2009 | MF | (England) Simon Walton | (England) Blackpool | 1 June 2009 |

== See also ==
Plymouth Argyle seasons
