= 2007–08 Plymouth Argyle F.C. season =

English football club season

Plymouth Argyle
2007–08 season
- Chairman: Paul Stapleton
- Manager: Paul Sturrock
- League Championship: 10th
- FA Cup: Third round
- League Cup: Third round
- Top goalscorer: League: Ebanks-Blake (11); All: Ebanks-Blake (12)
- Highest home attendance: 17,511 vs. Watford (22 March 2008)
- Lowest home attendance: League: 10,451 vs. Crystal Palace (2 October 2007); All: 5,133 vs. Doncaster (28 August 2007)
Home colours	Away colours

The 2007–08 football season was Plymouth Argyle Football Club's 39th season in the Football League Championship, the second division of English football, and their 103rd as a professional club.

This article shows statistics of individual players for the football club Plymouth Argyle. It also lists all matches played by the club in the 2007–08 season.

== Review and events ==
This is a list of the significant events to occur at the club during the 2007–08 season, presented in chronological order. This list does not include transfers, which are listed in the transfers section below, or match results, which are in the results section.

- 5 July: Argyle target Kevin Gallen, who was previously on loan to Argyle, signs with MK Dons.
- 5 July: Gary Sawyer signs a three-year contract extension, keeping him at the club until summer 2010.
- 20 July: New kit is announced.
- 23 July: Argyle arrive in Austria for their pre-season tour.
- 3 August: Dan Gosling is called up the England U17 squad for the 2007 FIFA U-17 World Cup.
- 3 August: Damon Lenszner resigns from the board of directors.
- 18 August: Ian Holloway misses the home game against Ipswich Town after being rushed to hospital with kidney stones.
- 21 August: Club captain Paul Wotton returns to action after nearly nine months out through injury.
- 15 September: Dan Gosling signs a three-year contract extension, keeping him at the club until summer 2010.
- 8 October: On loan defender Larrys Mabiala returns to PSG for treatment on his injured kneed. Larrys had was still yet to make an appearance for Argyle.
- 19 October: Bojan Djordjic has his contract terminated with the club.
- 21 November: Manager Ian Holloway resigned from Plymouth Argyle, signing a contract with Leicester City F.C. days later.
- 27 November: Paul Sturrock is appointed manager of Plymouth Argyle for the second time.
- 13 December: Paul Wotton plays his first game on over a year, in a 2–0 win reserve team victory over Exeter City.
- 3 January: Dan Gosling's £1.5m transfer to Everton is a new club record fee received for a player. He is also Argyle's first 1 million pound player.

== Players ==
=== Squad information ===
N	Pos.	Nat.	Name	Age	EU	Since	App	Goals	Ends	Transfer fee	Notes
1	GK	(France)	Larrieu	50	EU	2000	214	0	2008	Free	
23	GK	(England)	McCormick	43	EU	1999	136	0	2009	Youth system	
13	CB	(France)	Doumbe	47	EU	2004	111	3	2008	Free	
19	CB	(Netherlands)	Seip	44	EU	2006	71	3	2009	Free	
5	CB	(Hungary)	Timár	47	EU	2007 (Winter)	35	4	2009	£75k	
18	LB	(England)	Sawyer	41	EU	2004	40	0	2010	Youth system	
26	CM	(France)	Abdou	42	EU	2007	15	1	2008	Free	
20	CM	(England)	Summerfield	38	EU	2004	31	2	2008	Youth system	
16	LM	(Hungary)	Halmosi	47	EU	2007 (Winter)	47	7	2010	£400k	
14	CF	(New Zealand)	Fallon	44	EU	2007 (Winter)	30	3	2009	£300k	
36	CF	(Wales)	Easter	44	EU	2008 (Winter)	14	2		£210k	
25	CF	(England)	Mackie	41	EU	2008 (Winter)	2	2	2010	£145k	

- Last updated: 2 January 2008
- Source: pafc.com, players' Wikipedia articles, ESPN (for appearances and goals)
- Ordered by position on pitch (from back right to front left).
- Player must own an EU passport or be a full, current, 'A' international to legally play in English football. (Source)
- Squad size is unlimited.

=== Squad stats ===
				Total			League Championship		FA Cup		Football League Cup		Notes
No.	Pos.	Nat.	Name	Sts	App	Gls	App	Gls	App	Gls	App	Gls	Notes
1	GK	(France)	Larrieu	15	15		15						
2	RB	(England)	Connolly	27	27	1	24	1			3		
19	CB	(Netherlands)	Seip	29	29	1	26	1			3		
5	CB	(Hungary)	Timár	24	24	3	21	3			3		
17	LB	(England)	Hodges	20	24	1	22				2	1	
7	RM	(England)	Norris	28	28	5	26	5			2		Transferred mid season
4	CM	(France)	Nalis	23	24		23				1		
8	CM	(Hungary)	Buzsáky	10	13		11				2		Transferred mid season
16	LM	(Hungary)	Halmosi	26	28	3	26	3			2		
10	CF	(Jamaica) (England)	Hayles	22	24	2	23	2			1		Transferred mid season
9	CF	(England)	Ebanks-Blake	22	28	12	25	11			3	1	Transferred mid season
23	GK	(England)	McCormick	14	14		11				3		
13	CB	(France)	Doumbe	5	7		7						
18	LB	(England)	Sawyer	11	14		12				2		
29	RM	(England)	Martin	10	12	2	12	2					Loan ended mid season
22	RM	(England)	Gosling	5	10		10						Transferred mid season
26	CM	(France)	Abdou	9	15	1	14	1			1		
28	CB	(Scotland)	Laird	1	1						1		
20	CM	(England)	Summerfield	1	2	1					2	1	
11	CF	(England)	Chadwick	5	12	2	9	2			3		
14	CF	(New Zealand)	Fallon	4	15	2	13	2			2		
36	CF	(Wales)	Easter	5	9	2	9	2					
37	CF	(England)	Jutkiewicz		1		1						
27	CF	(England)	Reid	1	2						2		
32	LM	(Sweden)	Djordjic	1	2		1				1		Released 19 October 2007
25	LM	(England)	Dickson		1						1		
24	CF	(England)	Barnes		1						1		
15	CM	(England)	Wotton										

Last updated: 2 January 2008
Source: Match reports in competitive matches
Ordered by start team and position on pitch
0 shown as blank

=== Goalscorers ===
Name	League	Cup	Total
Sylvan Ebanks-Blake	11	1	12
David Norris	5	0	5
Péter Halmosi	3	0	3
Krisztián Timár	3	0	3
Nick Chadwick	2	0	2
Lee Martin	2	0	2
Barry Hayles	2	0	2
Rory Fallon	2	0	1
Jermaine Easter	2	0	1
Marcel Seip	1	0	1
Paul Connolly	1	0	1
Jimmy Abdou	1	0	1
Lee Hodges	0	1	1
Luke Summerfield	0	1	1
Own goal	0	1	1

=== Discipline ===
Name	Red cards	Yellow cards
Barry Hayles	0	7
Krisztián Timár	0	6
Lilian Nalis	0	6
Paul Connolly	0	4
Sylvan Ebanks-Blake	0	4
David Norris	0	5
Lee Martin	0	4
Marcel Seip	0	3
Jermaine Easter	0	3
Gary Sawyer	0	2
Ákos Buzsáky	0	1
Péter Halmosi	0	1
Dan Gosling	0	1
Total:	0	46

== Transfers ==
=== In ===
No.	Pos.	Nat.	Name	Age	EU	Moving from	Type	Transfer window	Ends	Transfer fee	Source
26	DM	(France)	Abdou	42	EU	Sedan (France)	Signed ✓	Summer	2008	Free	
6	DF	(France)	Mabiala	39	EU	Paris Saint-Germain (France)	Loan ✓	Summer	2008	Loan	Source
29	MF	(England)	Martin	39	EU	Manchester United	Loan ✓	Summer	2008	Loan	Source
36	CF	(Wales)	Easter	44	EU	Wycombe Wanderers	Transfer ✓	w	2008	£210k	Source
37	CF	(England)	Jutkiewicz	37	EU	Everton	Loan ✓	w	2008	Loan	Source
8	CM	(France)	Folly	40	EU	Sheffield Wednesday	Transfer ✓	w	2008	£xxxk	Source

=== Out ===
No.	Pos.	Nat.	Name	Age	EU	Moving to	Type	Transfer window	Transfer fee	Source
27	CF	(England)	Reid	38	EU	Wycombe Wanderers	Loan ✓	Summer	Loan	Source
28	CB	(Scotland)	Laird	38	EU	Torquay United	Loan ✓	Summer	Loan	Source
1	GK	(France)	Larrieu	50	EU	Yeovil Town	Loan ✓	Summer	Loan	Source
32	MF	(Sweden)	Djordjic	44	EU		Released ✓	Summer	Released	Source
25	LM	(England)	Dickson	39	EU	Brentford	Loan ✓	Summer	Loan	Source
24	CF	(England)	Barnes	18	EU	Oxford United	Loan ✓	Summer	Loan	Source
8	CM	(Hungary)	Buzsáky	44	EU	Queens Park Rangers	Transfer ✓	w	£500k	Source
10	CF	(Jamaica) (England)	Hayles	54	EU	Leicester City	Transfer ✓	w	£150k	Source
22	RM	(England)	Gosling	36	EU	Everton	Transfer ✓	w	£1.5m	Source
9	CF	(England)	Ebanks-Blake	40	EU	Wolverhampton Wanderers	Transfer ✓	w	£1.5m	
7	RM	(England)	Norris	45	EU	Ipswich Town	Transfer ✓	w	£3.0m	

Last updated: 2 January 2008
EU = if holds or not a European Union passport; Country: when 2 flags, 1st flag = country that plays for internationally, 2nd flag = country of birth; N = number on jersey; P = Position (for position name, pause mouse pointer on abbreviation); Name = Name on jersey (for more extensive name, pause mouse pointer on name); Age = age on the day of the signing; Moving from = only indicate the club the player was playing before start playing for this club in this season, for the type of the moving see Status column; Moving to = only indicates the club the player is going to play next, for the type of the moving see Status column; Ends = when the player's current contract ends; n/a = Not applicable.

== Team Kit ==
Supplier: Puma
Sponsor(s): Ginsters

Home	Away

== Competitions ==
=== Overall ===
Competition	Started round	Current position / round	Final position / round	First match	Last match
League Championship	—	12th		11 August 2007	
Football League Cup	1st round	3rd round	3rd round	14 August 2007	26 September 2007
FA Cup	3rd round	3rd round		5 January 2008	

Updated to match played 24 October 2007
Source: Competitions

== Results ==
=== League ===
==== Results summary ====
Overall								Home						Away					
Pld	W	D	L	GF	GA	GD	Pts	W	D	L	GF	GA	GD	W	D	L	GF	GA	GD
26	10	8	8	35	29	+6	38	5	6	2	19	12	+7	5	2	6	16	17	−1

Last updated: 2 January 2008.
Source: The Football League

==== Results by round ====
Round	1	2	3	4	5	6	7	8	9	10	11	12	13	14	15	16	17	18	19	20	21	22	23	24	25	26	27	28	29	30	31	32	33	34	35	36	37	38	39	40	41	42	43	44	45	46
Ground	A	H	A	H	H	A	A	H	H	A	H	A	A	H	A	H	A	H	H	A	H	A	A	H	H	A	H	H	A	H	A	H	A	A	H											
Result	W	D	L	D	D	W	L	D	W	D	W	W	L	L	D	W	W	L	W	L	D	W	L	W	D	L	W	D	L	W	L	D	L	D	L											

Updated to match(es) played on 2 January 2008. Source: Match Results
A = Away; H = Home; W = Win; D = Draw; L = Loss

=== Matches ===
Game	Date	Tournament	Round	Ground	Opponent	Score^{1}	Report
1	11 August 2007	League Championship	1	A	Hull City	3 – 2	Attendance: 16,633; Referee: G Laws 15' Norris; 45' Fallon; 82' Ebanks-Blake; (yellow card) 48' Halmosi
2	14 August 2007	Football League Cup	1st round	H	Wycombe Wanderers	2 – 1	Attendance: 5,474; Referee: C Penton 41' (o.g.) Bullock; 44' Hodges; (yellow card) 54' Connolly
3	18 August 2007	League Championship	2	H	Ipswich Town	1 – 1	Attendance: 13,260; Referee: K Friend 85' (pen.) Ebanks-Blake
4	25 August 2007	League Championship	3	A	Barnsley	2 – 3	Attendance: 9,240; Referee: B Knight 61' Hayles; 67' Chadwick; (yellow card) 45' Seip; (yellow card) 88' Hayles
5	28 August 2007	Football League Cup	2nd round	H	Doncaster Rovers	2 – 0	Attendance: 5,133; Referee: L Probert 15' Ebanks-Blake; 90' Summerfield
6	1 September 2007	League Championship	4	H	Leicester City	0 – 0	Attendance: 11,850; Referee: P Taylor
7	15 September 2007	League Championship	5	H	Cardiff City	2 – 2	Attendance: 11,951; Referee: R Beeby 31' Ebanks-Blake; 58' Ebanks-Blake; (yellow card) 63' Seip; (yellow card) 74' Ebanks-Blake
8	18 September 2007	League Championship	6	A	Queens Park Rangers	2 – 0	Attendance: 10,850; Referee: A Marriner 49' Halmosi; 62' Norris; (yellow card) 56' Seip; (yellow card) 70' Timár
9	22 September 2007	League Championship	7	A	Stoke City	2 – 3	Attendance: 12,533; Referee: N Miller 50' Seip; 59' Fallon; (yellow card) 36' Timár; (yellow card) 75' Nalis; (yellow card) 79' Buzsáky
10	26 September 2007	Football League Cup	3rd round	A	West Ham United	0 – 1	Attendance: 25,774; Referee: P Dowd 90+2' Ashton; (yellow card) 74' Timár
11	29 September 2007	League Championship	8	H	Wolverhampton Wanderers	1 – 1	Attendance: 13,638; Referee: P Joslin 61' Chadwick; (yellow card) 10' Hayles; (yellow card) 76' Sawyer
12	2 October 2007	League Championship	9	H	Crystal Palace	1 – 0	Attendance: 10,451; Referee: R Shoebridge 50' Halmosi; (yellow card) 81' Norris
13	6 October 2007	League Championship	10	A	Blackpool	0 – 0	Attendance: 8,784; Referee: J Moss (yellow card) 67' Nalis
14	20 October 2007	League Championship	11	H	Coventry City	1 – 0	Attendance: 11,576; Referee: K Hill 16' Martin; (yellow card) 17' Timár; (yellow card) 40' Norris; (yellow card) 71' Connolly; (yellow card) 90' Hayles
15	23 October 2007	League Championship	12	A	Charlton Athletic	2 – 1	Attendance: 22,123; Referee: R Styles 6' Ebanks-Blake; 40' Hayles; (yellow card) 35' Hayles; (yellow card) 45' Martin; (yellow card) 54' Connolly
16	27 October 2007	League Championship	13	A	Preston North End	0 – 2	Attendance: 11,055; Referee: M Pike
17	3 November 2007	League Championship	14	H	Sheffield Wednesday	1 – 2	Attendance: 12,145; Referee: A D'Urso 47' (pen.) Ebanks-Blake; (yellow card) 79' Martin
18	6 November 2007	League Championship	15	A	Colchester United	1 – 1	Attendance: 4,833; Referee: G Hegley 88' Norris
19	10 November 2007	League Championship	16	H	Norwich City	3 – 0	Attendance: 11,222; Referee: D Drysdale 26' Martin; 47' Connolly; 49' Norris; (yellow card) 8' Timár
20	24 November 2007	League Championship	17	A	Sheffield United	1 – 0	Attendance: 23,811; Referee: M Russell 24' Halmosi; (yellow card) 90' Norris
21	28 November 2007	League Championship	18	H	West Bromwich Albion	1 – 2	Attendance: 14,348; Referee: S Bennett 84' Easter; (yellow card) 30' Hayles; (yellow card) 47' Nalis
22	1 December 2007	League Championship	19	H	Scunthorpe United	3 – 0	Attendance: 10,520; Referee: F Graham 51' Ebanks-Blake; 64' Timár; 77' Abdou; (yellow card) 26' Martin; (yellow card) 32' Timár
23	4 December 2007	League Championship	20	A	Norwich City	1 – 2	Attendance: 25,434; Referee: P Taylor 89' Timár; (yellow card) 38' Hayles; (yellow card) 47' Nalis; (yellow card) 86' Connolly; (yellow card) 90+4' Ebanks-Blake
24	8 December 2007	League Championship	21	H	Bristol City	1 – 1	Attendance: 16,530; Referee: P Dowd 23' (pen.) Ebanks-Blake; (yellow card) 13' Nalis; (yellow card) 55' Connolly
25	15 December 2007	League Championship	22	A	Watford	1 – 0	Attendance: 18,532; Referee: D Deadman 88' Norris; (yellow card) 38' Gosling; (yellow card) 63' Timár
26	22 December 2007	League Championship	23	A	Crystal Palace	1 – 2	Attendance: 15,097; Referee: M Jones 47' Easter; (yellow card) 31' Hayles; (yellow card) 90' Sawyer
27	26 December 2007	League Championship	24	H	Queens Park Rangers	2 – 1	Attendance: 16,502; Referee: S Bratt 49' (pen.) Ebanks-Blake; 90' Ebanks-Blake; (yellow card) 53' Ebanks-Blake; (yellow card) 86' Nalis; (yellow card) 88' Easter
28	29 December 2007	League Championship	25	H	Stoke City	2 – 2	Attendance: 13,692; Referee: S Tanner 44' Ebanks-Blake; 67' Timár; (yellow card) 78' Norris
29	1 January 2008	League Championship	26	A	Cardiff City	0 – 1	Attendance: 14,965; Referee: A Wiley (yellow card) 12' Martin; (yellow card) 73' Easter; (yellow card) 85' Norris
30	5 January 2008	FA Cup	3rd round	H	Hull City	3 – 2	
31	12 January 2008	League Championship	27	A	Burnley	0 – 1	
32	19 January 2008	League Championship	28	H	Southampton	1 – 1	
33	26 January 2008	FA Cup	4R	A	Portsmouth	1 – 2	
34	29 January 2008	League Championship	29	A	Ipswich Town	0 – 0	
35	2 February 2008	League Championship	30	H	Hull City	0 – 1	
36	9 February 2008	League Championship	31		Leicester City	1 – 0	
37	12 February 2008	League Championship	32	H	Barnsley	3 – 0	
38	19 February 2008	League Championship	33	A	Southampton	2 – 0	
39	23 February 2008	League Championship	34	H	Burnley	3 – 1	
40	1 March 2008	League Championship	35	A	West Bromwich Albion	0 – 3	
41	4 March 2008	League Championship	36	H	Colchester United	4 – 1	
42	8 March 2008	League Championship	37	H	Sheffield United	0 – 1	
43	11 March 2008	League Championship	38		Scunthorpe United	0 – 1	
44	15 March 2008	League Championship	39	A	Bristol City	2 – 1	
45	22 March 2008	League Championship	40	H	Watford	1 – 1	
46	29 March 2008	League Championship	41	A	Coventry City	1 – 3	
47	5 April 2008	League Championship	42	H	Charlton Athletic	1 – 2	
48	14 April 2008	League Championship	43	A	Sheffield Wednesday	1 – 1	
49	19 April 2008	League Championship	44	H	Preston North End	2 – 2	
50	26 April 2008	League Championship	45	H	Blackpool	3 – 0	
51	4 May 2008	League Championship	46		Wolverhampton Wanderers	0 – 1	

Last updated: 2 January 2008
Source: The Football League, 2007–08 FA Cup and League Cup 2007–08
^{1}Plymouth Argyle goals come first.
National flags for Ground and Opponent columns are only shown when different from that of Plymouth Argyle.
M = Match; Ground: H = Home, A = Away, N = Neutral, HR = Home replacement, AR = Away replacement.

=== Pre-season ===
Match	Date	Competition or tour	Ground	Opponent	Score^{1}	Scorers	GD
1	11 July 2007	—	A	Weston-super-Mare A.F.C.	1 - 0	Hodges 19'	1
2	14 July 2007	—	A	Torquay United	0 - 1		-1
3	17 July 2007	—	A	Yeovil Town	2 - 1	Buzsáky 7'; Ebanks-Blake 55' (pen)	1
4	18 July 2007	—	A	Liskeard Athletic	5 - 0	Chadwick 5', 11'; Kendall 16'; Fallon 45'; Samba 75'	5
5	21 July 2007	—	A	Cambridge United	2 - 1	Norris 19'; Ebanks-Blake 78'	1
6	24 July 2007	Austria	N (Austria)	Gençlerbirliği (Turkey)	1 - 1	Reid 86'	0
7	27 July 2007	Austria	N (Austria)	Hapoel Tel Aviv (Israel)	1 - 1	Buzsáky 69'	0
8	31 July 2007	—	A	Paulton Rovers	4 - 0	Dickson 37'; Chadwick 48', 73'; McVeigh 84'	4
9	1 August 2007	—	A	Truro City	4 - 0	Halmosi; Reid (2); Buzsáky	4
10	4 August 2007	—	H	Bristol Rovers	7 - 3	Halmosi 6'; Fallon 23', 25'; Norris 31'; Buzsáky 53'; McVeigh 68, 83'	4

Last updated: 7 August 2007
^{1}Plymouth Argyle goals come first.
Country's flag depict country of foreign team to that of Plymouth Argyle.
Ground: H = Home; A = Away; N = Neutral; HR = Home replacement; AR = Away replacement; GD = Goal difference
