= Mathias Kouo-Doumbé =

French footballer (born 1979)

Mathias Doumbé
Personal information
- Full name: Mathias Kouo-Doumbé
- Date of birth: 28 October 1979 (age 46)
- Place of birth: Drancy, France
- Height: 6 ft 1 in (1.85 m)
- Position: Defender

Youth career
- 1992–1999: A.A.S. Sarcelles
- 1999–2001: Paris Saint-Germain

Senior career*
| Years | Team | Apps | (Gls) |
| 2001–2004 | Hibernian | 46 | (2) |
| 2004–2009 | Plymouth Argyle | 134 | (4) |
| 2009–2013 | Milton Keynes Dons | 121 | (11) |
| 2013–2014 | Northampton Town | 32 | (3) |
| Total | | 331 | (19) |

International career
- France U21
- * Club domestic league appearances and goals

Mathias Kouo-Doumbé (born 28 October 1979), often known simply as Mat or Mathias Doumbé, is a French former footballer.

He began his career in his native France, where he was on the books of Paris Saint-Germain and was capped by the French under-21 team. He moved to Scotland in 2001 to play for Premier League club Hibernian, and went on to spend three years with the club, playing in the 2004 Scottish League Cup Final. He switched to English club Plymouth Argyle in May 2004, and spent five seasons playing in the Championship. He dropped down a division when he joined Milton Keynes Dons for a four-year spell in August 2009. After a four-year spell with the Dons, he signed with League Two side Northampton Town in September 2013.

== Playing career ==
Doumbé, the son of a Cameroonian father, was offered a place at INF Clairefontaine at the age of 13 alongside his friend Philippe Christanval, but his parents turned down the offer as they wanted him to focus on his schoolwork. Nevertheless, he won a contract at Paris Saint-Germain and was capped by the French under-21 team against Romania, only to be shown the door at the Parc des Princes after picking up a serious ankle injury.

=== Hibernian ===
Doumbé was signed by Alex McLeish at Scottish Premier League club Hibernian in October 2001. He did not feature in the "Hibs" side in the 2001–02 season, but was still handed a new one-year deal in June 2002.

He made his debut on 18 August 2002, conceding a penalty in a 4–2 defeat to Rangers at Easter Road. He made a further 14 appearances in the 2002–03 season, as new boss Bobby Williamson searched for a solution to the club's poor defensive record.

In August 2003, it was reported that Dundee United boss Ian McCall had offered a cash sum plus David McCracken in exchange for Doumbé. He scored his first senior goal on 27 September, in a 2–1 home defeat to Celtic. He established himself at centre-back during the 2003–04 season, and played in the League Cup final defeat to Livingston at Hampden Park. At the end of the campaign he rejected the offer of a new contract after being linked with a move to Rangers.

=== Plymouth Argyle ===
Doumbé turned down a three-year deal at Hibernian when he joined his former manager Bobby Williamson at Plymouth Argyle on a free transfer in May 2004. He enjoyed an impressive start to the 2004–05 season, and was soon linked with a move to Premier League side Everton. Days after being linked with a move away from Home Park, he was described by Williamson as being "very committed and very brave, or foolish, whatever way you want to look at it" after he required 24 stitches in his head after challenging for the ball in a 2–1 defeat to Leicester City at the Walkers Stadium.

He firmly established himself in the first team in the 2005–06 campaign, making a total of 43 Championship appearances as new boss Tony Pulis focused on shoring up the defence. He signed a new two-year contract in May 2006.

He continued to be an important player after Ian Holloway replaced Pulis as manager, and he played 30 games in the 2006–07 season.

Doumbé featured just 14 times for the "Pilgrims" in the 2007–08 season, with Paul Sturrock (yet another new manager) generally preferring the central defensive partnership of Marcel Seip and Krisztián Timár. In May 2008, Doumbé signed a two-year extension to his contract, as he became Argyle's longest-serving outfield player, second only to goalkeeper Romain Larrieu.

Loan signing Craig Cathcart was generally preferred to play alongside Marcel Seip in the 2008–09 season, limiting Doumbé to 24 appearances. Doumbé had a trial with Millwall in July 2009 after "Lions" boss Kenny Jackett admitted that he was short on defenders. His contract with Argyle was cancelled by mutual consent the following month.

=== Milton Keynes Dons ===
Doumbé signed with Milton Keynes Dons on 7 August 2009. He played his first game for The Dons the following day at Stadium mk in a 0–0 draw with Hartlepool United. He went on to play 39 games in the 2009–10 campaign as Paul Ince led the club to a 12th-place finish in League One.

He made 51 appearances in the 2010–11 campaign as new boss Karl Robinson took MK to the play-off semi-finals, where they were knocked out by Peterborough United. He signed a new two-year contract in June 2011.

He missed the first six weeks of the 2011–12 season with an ankle injury picked up in a friendly defeat to Oxford United. He went on to score five goals despite featuring in just 23 games, and was absent from the end-of-season run-in that ended with a play-off semi-final defeat to Huddersfield Town.

Doumbé featured 28 times in the 2012–13 campaign and was released in May 2013.

He went on trial at Port Vale in July 2013, but did not sign a contract; manager Micky Adams said that "It's well documented that I would have liked to have brought in Matt Doumbe, but that's not been possible."

=== Northampton Town ===
In September 2013, Doumbé joined League Two side Northampton Town until the end of the 2013–14 season. Manager Aidy Boothroyd said that "He's got more cuts and bruises on his head than I've ever seen in a centre-half, which is a good sign. He's brave, he's calm under pressure and he'll get his share of goals."

On 21 September 2013, Doumbé made his debut for Northampton in a 3–0 defeat at Mansfield Town, with the third of Mansfield's goals being an own-goal by Doumbé. Doumbé was used regularly in central defence as Northampton's form improved after new manager Chris Wilder arrived at Sixfields in January. However, despite chipping in with three goals in the second half of the season, including the winner in the final game against Oxford - a win which ultimately secured Northampton's safety in League Two, Doumbé was not offered a new contract for the 2014–15 season.

== Style of play ==
Doumbé prefers to play on the right-side of central defence. He is a speedy player with good heading and marking abilities.

== Statistics ==
As of 1 September 2013.

| Season | Club | Division | League | | FA Cup | | League Cup | | Other | | Total | |
| Season | Club | Division | Apps | Goals | Apps | Goals | Apps | Goals | Apps | Goals | Apps | Goals |
|---|---|---|---|---|---|---|---|---|---|---|---|---|
| 2001–02 | Hibernian | SPL | 0 | 0 | 0 | 0 | 0 | 0 | 0 | 0 | 0 | 0 |
| 2002–03 | Hibernian | SPL | 13 | 0 | 2 | 0 | 0 | 0 | 0 | 0 | 15 | 0 |
| 2003–04 | Hibernian | SPL | 33 | 2 | 1 | 0 | 5 | 0 | 0 | 0 | 39 | 2 |
| Total | | | 46 | 2 | 3 | 0 | 5 | 0 | 0 | 0 | 54 | 2 |
| 2004–05 | Plymouth Argyle | Championship | 26 | 2 | 1 | 0 | 1 | 0 | 0 | 0 | 28 | 2 |
| 2005–06 | Plymouth Argyle | Championship | 43 | 1 | 1 | 0 | 2 | 0 | 0 | 0 | 46 | 1 |
| 2006–07 | Plymouth Argyle | Championship | 29 | 0 | 0 | 0 | 1 | 0 | 0 | 0 | 30 | 0 |
| 2007–08 | Plymouth Argyle | Championship | 12 | 0 | 2 | 0 | 0 | 0 | 0 | 0 | 14 | 0 |
| 2008–09 | Plymouth Argyle | Championship | 24 | 1 | 0 | 0 | 0 | 0 | 0 | 0 | 24 | 1 |
| Total | | | 134 | 4 | 4 | 0 | 4 | 0 | 0 | 0 | 142 | 4 |
| 2009–10 | Milton Keynes Dons | League One | 33 | 1 | 2 | 0 | 1 | 0 | 3 | 0 | 39 | 1 |
| 2010–11 | Milton Keynes Dons | League One | 44 | 5 | 2 | 0 | 2 | 0 | 3 | 0 | 51 | 5 |
| 2011–12 | Milton Keynes Dons | League One | 20 | 4 | 3 | 1 | 0 | 0 | 0 | 0 | 23 | 5 |
| 2012–13 | Milton Keynes Dons | League One | 24 | 1 | 4 | 0 | 0 | 0 | 0 | 0 | 28 | 1 |
| Total | | | 121 | 11 | 11 | 1 | 3 | 0 | 6 | 0 | 141 | 12 |
| 2013–14 | Northampton Town | League Two | 32 | 3 | 2 | 0 | 0 | 0 | 0 | 0 | 34 | 2 |
| Total | | | 32 | 2 | 2 | 0 | 0 | 0 | 0 | 0 | 34 | 2 |
| Career total | | | 333 | 19 | 20 | 1 | 12 | 0 | 6 | 0 | 371 | 20 |

== Honours ==
=== Club ===
Hibernian

- Scottish League Cup runner-up: 2004

=== Individual ===
- Milton Keynes Dons Player's Player of the Year: 2010–11
