= 2006–07 Plymouth Argyle F.C. season =

English football club season

Plymouth Argyle
- Manager: Ian Holloway
- Stadium: Home Park
- Championship: 11th
- FA Cup: Quarter-finals
- League Cup: 1st round
- Top goalscorer: League: All: Barry Hayles (14)
Home colours	Away colours

The 2007–08 football season was Plymouth Argyle Football Club's 38th season in the Football League Championship, the second division of English football, and their 102nd as a professional club.

== Summary of the 2006–07 season ==
After only eight months as manager, during which he was credited with saving Argyle from relegation, Tony Pulis returned to Stoke City in mid-June. Two weeks later, former Queens Park Rangers (QPR) manager Ian Holloway, was appointed manager.

Holloway quickly added the team's only striker, Nick Chadwick, with veteran Barry Hayles from Millwall and 20-year-old Sylvan Ebanks-Blake from Manchester United who became the leading scorers of the season with 14 and 10 goals respectively. The addition of Dutch defender Marcel Seip, ultimately displaced Aljofree in central defence. In goal, Luke McCormick got first team action with Romain Larrieu out sick and kept his place.

Several young players established themselves in the first team especially Gary Sawyer who became a regular on the left of defense, especially after Tony Capaldi appeared set to leave at the end of the season. Luke Summerfield and Dan Gosling also impressed.

The first third of the season saw a fairly good start, where Holloway's signings, enthusiasm and more attacking style appeared to be lifting team performances from the previous season and to 6th place after 15 games. The possibility play-off and even promotion began to be talked about. However, the lack of depth showed mid-season as the accumulation of suspensions and injuries (including Paul Wotton out for the season with a knee injury) forced Holloway to draw ever deeper into reserves, and with a slide in results and position.

Holloway moved aggressively during the January transfer window, bringing in loanees Kevin Gallen (striker, QPR), Hungarians Péter Halmosi (midfield) and Krisztián Timár (defence), and 17-year-old Scott Sinclair (left wing, Chelsea) and permanent signing Rory Fallon (Halmosi and Timár became permanent signings at the end of the season). Settling the new players in took time and though performances improved, it was not sufficiently to boost Argyle far up the table.

However, Argyle had an excellent FA Cup run making it into the quarter finals before losing 1–0 against Watford, the farthest any non-premiership team made it. It was, however, a game that they should have won and the lack of killer instinct showed in this game and others. The team seemed to go into a funk after the Watford loss with a string of mediocre results which saw them drifting in mid-table. However, the team rallied at the end of the season with five successive wins and its best finish in 50 years.

Season	Wins	Losses	Draws	Points	Position
2006–07	17	13	16	67	11
2005–06	13	16	17	56	14
2004–05	14	21	11	53	17

Midfielder Lilian Nalis was voted player of the year and defender Gary Sawyer young player of the year.

While Argyle ended the season with no financial troubles, a big question remains over the ability of the team to attract the investment likely needed to lift the team to the Premiership with investments in players, stadium, and training facilities.

== Team ==
The 2006–07 Plymouth Argyle first-team squad: Note: Flags indicate national team as defined under FIFA eligibility rules; some limited exceptions apply. Players may hold more than one non-FIFA nationality.

No.	Pos.	Nation	Player
1	GK	FRA	Romain Larrieu
2	DF	ENG	Anthony Barness
4	MF	FRA	Lilian Nalis
5	DF	HUN	Krisztián Timár (on loan from Ferencvárosi TC)
6	DF	ENG	Hasney Aljofree
7	MF	ENG	David Norris
8	MF	HUN	Ákos Buzsáky
9	FW	ENG	Sylvan Ebanks-Blake
10	FW	JAM	Barry Hayles
11	FW	ENG	Nick Chadwick
12			Green Army
13	DF	FRA	Mathias Doumbe
14	DF	NIR	Tony Capaldi
15	DF	ENG	Paul Wotton (captain)
16	MF	HUN	Péter Halmosi (on loan from Debreceni VSC)
17	FW	ENG	Kevin Gallen (on loan from QPR)

No.	Pos.	Nation	Player
18	DF	ENG	Gary Sawyer
19	DF	NED	Marcel Seip
20	MF	ENG	Lee Hodges
21	FW	ENG	Cherno Samba
22	DF	ENG	Paul Connolly
23	GK	ENG	Luke McCormick
24	GK	ENG	Josh Clapham
27	FW	ENG	Reuben Reid
28	DF	SCO	Scott Laird
29	MF	ENG	Luke Summerfield
30	MF	ENG	Dan Gosling
31	FW	IRL	Anthony Mason
32	MF	SWE	Bojan Djordjic
33	FW	NZL	Rory Fallon
34	FW	ENG	Ashley Barnes

12 Green Army is not a real player, but was registered by the club as a tribute to the supporters. The idea behind assigning the number 12 was that the great support from fans gives Argyle a similar advantage to having an extra (twelfth) player.

== Transfers ==
=== Out ===
Date	Player	Transfer	To	Fee
18 August 2006	Chris Zebroski	Released	Free Agent	Released after being found guilty of gross misconduct
18 May 2007	Josh Clapham	Released	Free Agent	
25 May 2007	Tony Capaldi	Contract Expired	Free Agent	Signed for Cardiff

=== In ===
Date	Player	Transfer	From	Fee
14 July 2006	Sylvan Ebanks-Blake	Buy	Manchester United	£200,000 + £100,000 if plays enough matches
19 July 2006	Barry Hayles	Buy	Millwall	£100,000
4 August 2006	Josh Clapham	Free	Trial	N/A
30 August 2006	Marcel Seip	Free	Heerenveen	N/A
30 August 2006	Cherno Samba	Free	Cádiz	N/A
11 January 2007	Kevin Gallen	Loan	QPR	N/A
11 January 2007	Péter Halmosi	Loan	Debreceni VSC	N/A
11 January 2007	Krisztián Timár	Loan	Ferencváros	N/A
17 January 2007	Scott Sinclair	Loan	Chelsea F.C.	N/A
19 January 2007	Rory Fallon	Buy	Swansea City F.C.	£300,000
16 March 2007	Ashley Barnes	Free	Paulton Rovers	N/A
16 May 2007	Péter Halmosi	Buy	Debreceni VSC	£400,000
16 May 2007	Krisztián Timár	Buy	Ferencváros	£75,000

== Competitions ==
=== Championship ===
==== Table ====
Pos	Team	Pld	W	D	L	GF	GA	GD	Pts
9	Sheffield Wednesday	46	20	11	15	70	66	+4	**71**
10	Colchester United	46	20	9	17	70	56	+14	**69**
**11**	Plymouth Argyle	**46**	**17**	**16**	**13**	**63**	**62**	**+1**	**67**
12	Crystal Palace	46	18	11	17	59	51	+8	**65**
13	Cardiff City	46	17	13	16	57	53	+4	**64**

Source: RSSSF
Rules for classification: In the Football League goals scored (F) takes precedence over goal difference (GD).

==== Results ====
Date	Opposition	Venue	Result	Scorers (for Plymouth Argyle in bold)	Attend.	Pos.
5 Aug	Wolves	Home	Draw (1–1)	**Hayles 35**, Doumbe 47 (og)	15,964	9
8 Aug	Colchester	Away	Win (1–0)	**Summerfield 30**	4,627	7
12 Aug	Sunderland	Away	Win (2–3)	Murphy 1, **Norris 8**, **Hayles 39**, Elliott 67, **Chadwick 82**	24,377	2
19 Aug	Sheff. Weds.	Home	Loss (1–2)	**Wotton 43,** McAllister 52, O'Brien 83	14,507	9
26 Aug	Stoke	Away	Draw (1–1)	Sidibe 39, **Hayles** 78	11,626	8
9 Sept	QPR	Home	Draw (1–1)	Blackstock 17, **Ebanks-Blake** 31	12,138	9
12 Sept	Cardiff	Home	Draw (3–3)	Thompson 8, Chopra 29, 49, **McNaughton (og)** 69,**Hayles** 74, **Purse (og)** 88	11,655	11
16 Sept	Southampton	Away	Loss (0–1)	Rasiak 52	22,514	15
23 Sept	Norwich	Home	Win (3–1)	**Doherty 14 (og), Seip 47, Norris 74,** Earnshaw 94	11,813	9
30 Sept	Coventry	Away	Win (1–0)	**Samba 82**	19,545	8
14 Oct	Derby	Home	Win (3–1)	**Wotton 45 (pen)**, Lupoli 45+2, **Wotton 63 (pen)**, **Seip 79**	13,622	5
17 Oct	Barnsley	Away	Draw (2–2)	Kay 2, **Ebanks-Blake 29**, **Hayles 34**, Richards 50	9,479	6
21 Oct	Burnley	Home	Draw (0–0)	-	12,817	7
28 Oct	Crystal Palace	Away	Win (1–0)	**Chadwick 39**	17,084	5
31 Oct	Ipswich	Home	Draw (1–1)	Legwinski 1, **Wotton 22**	12,210	6
4 Nov	Birmingham	Home	Loss (0–1)	Jaidi 75,	17,008	7
11 Nov	Leicester	Away	Draw (2–2)	Hume 29, **Nalis 31**, Porter 75, **Hayles 90**	21,703	7
18 Nov	Southend	Away	Draw (1–1)	**Djordjic 5**, Gower 59,	9,469	9
25 Nov	Leeds	Home	Loss (1–2)	Blake 3, **Djordjic 40**, Lewis 61	17,088	12
28 Nov	Luton	Home	Win (1–0)	**Djordjic 61**	9,965	9
2 Dec	Birmingham	Away	Loss (0–3)	Bendtner 21, Upson 30, McSheffrey 41	22,592	11
9 Dec	Hull	Home	Win (1–0)	**Ebanks-Blake 71**	12,101	10
16 Dec	Preston	Away	Loss (0–3)	Pugh 12, Omerod 41, Alexander 56	13,171	12
23 Dec	West Brom	Home	Draw (2–2)	**Hayles 23, Nalis 40**, Phillips 45+1, 45+3	15,172	12
26 Dec	Cardiff	Away	Draw(2–2)	**Norris 34**, Thompson 47, 52, **Norris 59**	17,289	13
30 Dec	Derby	Away	Loss (0–1)	Bisgaard 81	25,775	13
1 Jan	Southampton	Home	Draw (1–1)	Rasiak 5, **Hayles 66**	15,377	13
13 Jan	Norwich	Away	Win (3–1)	Safri 45+1, **Hayles 59, Buzsaky 63, 57**	23,523	12
22 Jan	Coventry	Home	Win (3–2)	**Gallen 18**, Birchall 22, **Buzsaky 32, Hayles 48**, Mifsud 70	9,841	11
30 Jan	West Brom	Away	Loss (1–2)	Kamara 41(pen), 50, **Fallon 70**	19,894	11
3 Feb	Wolves	Away	Draw (2–2)	**Sinclair 27**, Ward 33, **Timar 36**, Olofinjana 69	19,082	11
10 Feb	Sunderland	Home	Loss (0–2)	Stokes 69, Connolly 71	15,247	11
20 Feb	Colchester	Home	Win (3–0)	**Norris 12, Ebanks-Blake 59 (pen), Gosling 67**	12,895	11
24 Feb	QPR	Away	Draw (1–1)	**Nalis 32**, Cook 59,	13,757	12
3 Mar	Stoke	Home	Draw (1–1)	**Ebanks-Blake 40 (pen)**, Russell 55	12,539	12
5 Mar	Sheff. Wed.	Away	Draw (1–1)	MacClean 21, **Gosling, 56**	19,449	12
14 Mar	Barnsley	Home	Loss (2–4)	**Nalis 15**, Nyatanga 20, Devaney 31, **Ebanks-Blake**, Devaney 61, Ferenczi 93	10,265	13
17 Mar	Crystal Palace	Home	Win (1–0)	**Sinclair 48**	11,239	13
31 Mar	Ipswich	Away	Loss (0–3)	Garvan 9, Lee 15, Haynes 90	21,078	13
3 Apr	Burnley	Away	Loss (0–4)	Duff 13, McVeigh 20, Jones 38, Elliot 61	9,793	13
7 Apr	Leeds	Away	Loss (1–2)	**Halmosi 36,** Healy 45, Michalik 87	30,034	15
9 Apr	Leicester	Home	Win (3–0)	**Halmosi 15, Ebanks-Blake 46, Hayles 62**	10,900	13
14 Apr	Luton	Away	Win (2–1)	**Norris 4, Halmosi 40**, O'Leary 51	7,601	13
21 Apr	Southend	Home	Win (2–1)	**Ebanks-Blake 6,** Clarke 25, **Hayles 89**	11,097	12
28 Apr	Preston	Home	Win (2–0)	**Ebanks-Blake 77, Hayles 85**	13,813	12
6 May	Hull	Away	Win (2–1)	**Halmosi 45+1, Ebanks-Blake 59** Elliot 61	20,661	11

=== FA Cup ===
Date	Opposition	Venue	Result	Scorers (for Plymouth Argyle in bold)	Attend.	Pos.
6 Jan	Peterborough	Away	Draw (1–1)	**Aljofree 74**, Mclean 78	6,255	-
16 Jan	Peterborough	Home	Win (2–1)	Mclean 13, **Hayles 18, Norris 27**	9,973	-
27 Jan	Barnet	Away	Win (2–0)	**Aljofree 67 (pen), Sinclair 83**	5,204	-
17 Feb	Derby	Home	Win (2–0)	**Gallen 14 (pen), Sinclair 83**	18,026	-
11 Mar	Watford	Home	Loss (0–1)	Bouazza 21	20,652	-

=== League Cup ===
Date	Opposition	Venue	Result	Scorers (for Plymouth Argyle in bold)	Attend.	Pos.
22 Aug	Walsall	Home	Loss (0–1)	Dann 85	6,407	-

== Pre-season results ==
The pre-season saw wins over Tiverton (4–0), Grays Athletic (3–0), FC Gratkorn (5–1), and Yeovil (2–0) and losses to Real Madrid (0–1) and Bristol Rovers (0–1). A pre-season altercation between first-year Chris Zebroski and team captain, mid-fielder Paul Wotton in an Austrian bar resulted in 100 stitches to Wotton's head and the sacking of Zebroski. Wotton recovered for the first game of the season.
