= Marcel Seip =

Dutch former professional footballer (born 1982)

Personal information
- Full name: Marcel Seip
- Date of birth: 5 April 1982 (age 44)
- Place of birth: Winschoten, Netherlands
- Position: Centre back

Team information
- Current team: ACV

Senior career*
Years	Team	Apps	(Gls)
1999–2001	Veendam	27	(0)
2001–2006	Heerenveen	95	(2)
2006–2011	Plymouth Argyle	134	(6)
2009	→ Blackpool (loan)	7	(2)
2010	→ Sheffield United (loan)	6	(0)
2010–2011	→ Charlton Athletic (loan)	0	(0)
2011–2012	Bradford City	23	(1)
2012–2013	VVV-Venlo	31	(5)
2013–2014	Central Coast Mariners	14	(0)
2014–2016	FC Emmen	52	(1)

International career
2003	Netherlands U21	1	(0)
- * Club domestic league appearances and goals as of 6 June 2016

Marcel Seip (Dutch pronunciation: [mɑrˌsɛl ˈsɛip]; born 5 April 1982) is a Dutch former professional footballer who plays as a centre back for ACV in the Dutch Hoofdklasse. He previously played for Veendam, Heerenveen, Plymouth Argyle, Blackpool, Sheffield United, Charlton Athletic, Bradford City, VVV Venlo, Central Coast Mariners and FC Emmen.

== Club career ==
=== Veendam ===
Born in Winschoten, Seip made his debut for Eerste Divisie side BV Veendam in 1999, making six appearances in the 1999–2000 season. The following season he played 18 league games. Seip made a total of 27 league appearances for Veendam.

=== Heerenveen ===
In 2001 Seip signed for Eredivisie club SC Heerenveen, making his debut in the 2002–03 season and went on to make six league appearances that season, as Heerenveen finished in seventh place, qualifying for the 2003 UEFA Intertoto Cup. Seip played in all five of the club's games in the Intertoto Cup, as they reached the finals, where they lost to Spanish La Liga side Villarreal.

In 2003–04, he made 31 league appearances and scored one goal as Heerenveen finished in fourth place, qualifying for the 2004–05 UEFA Cup. The following season he made 30 league appearances, scoring one goal and made six appearances in the UEFA Cup. Heerveneen qualified for the 2005–06 UEFA Cup in which he played seven games, whilst making a further 28 Eredivisie appearances.

Seip was though unable to keep a regular place in the starting line up and his contract expired during the summer of 2006. He made a total of 113 appearances, scoring 3 goals in five years with Heerenveen.

=== Plymouth Argyle ===
After a trial with Russian side Spartak Moscow, Seip moved to England on 7 September 2006 with Championship club Plymouth Argyle, initially on a three-month contract.

He made his debut for the Pilgrims on 16 September 2006, as a 31st-minute substitute in a 1–0 defeat to Southampton at St. Mary's Stadium. His first goal coincided with his full debut in a 3–1 victory over Norwich City at Home Park a week later.

In November, Seip agreed to a three-year contract, tying him to the club until the summer of 2009. Seip was an ever-present in the starting line-up, making 42 league and cup appearances, and scoring two goals, in his first season.

On 5 April 2008, Seip refused to be a substitute in a league fixture against Charlton Athletic, after having made four successive starts. He was subsequently fined two weeks wages, and placed on the transfer list, by manager Paul Sturrock.

On 4 July, Seip apologised to Sturrock and his teammates over the Charlton affair. As a result, the club removed him from the transfer list. In the 2008–09 season Seip was once again a regular in the first-team and in November 2008, renewed his contract with Argyle, tying him to the club until the summer of 2011. He made a total of 42 appearances that season, scoring three goals.

After a 1–3 defeat at home to Sheffield Wednesday on 29 August 2009, Seip was again placed on the transfer list after a "breach of discipline", reported to have been a "dressing room bust up with manager Paul Sturrock".

=== Loan moves ===
On 28 September it was reported that Seip was set to join fellow Championship side Blackpool on a one-month loan deal, where he would join up with his former manager Ian Holloway. The following day it was confirmed that Seip had signed for the Seasiders the previous evening, on loan until 31 October. Later that day he was an unused substitute in Blackpool's 2–0 defeat to Bristol City at Ashton Gate Stadium.

His first appearance was for the reserve team in their 4–3 Central League Division One West win over Preston North End on 14 October. After receiving clearance to play, three days later he made his first team debut, and scored the opening goal in a 2–0 win over his parent club, Plymouth Argyle, at Bloomfield Road. After the game Seip said of both his goal and Paul Sturrock, "I'm delighted to have scored. I was training on my own at Plymouth. I'll never play for that man again, and he'll never pick me. Yes, we have had a big fallout but Blackpool have given me a chance and I want to take it"

However, the goal and the fact that Plymouth allowed Seip to play in the game created controversy with Argyle club captain Carl Fletcher later saying, "Marcel playing for Blackpool should never have happened. It made the whole club look like a Mickey Mouse club, and players take that to heart. At the end of the season, if we get relegated by one goal, that's going to affect the livelihoods of 30-odd players here and people working at the club."

In his second game for the club Seip opened the scoring, in a 3–0 win at home to Sheffield United on 20 October. It was his second goal, both of them headers, in three days. He was named in The Championship "Team of the Week", along with teammates Stephen Crainey and Matthew Gilks, following his performance in Blackpool's 0–0 draw with Swansea City on 24 October at the Liberty Stadium. On 3 November his loan spell was extended by a further two months until 29 December. With his loan deal at Blackpool expired, Seip signed on loan for Sheffield United on 1 January 2010 until the end of the 2009–10 season. His time at Bramall Lane was interrupted by injuries however, and he made only eight appearances for the South Yorkshire club before his loan spell expired. In June 2011, Seip was awarded £70,000 in damages following a bonus dispute with Blackpool, due to Blackpool's promotion to the Premier League.

=== Bradford City ===
In October 2011, three months after being released by Plymouth Argyle, he joined Bradford City on a three-month contract. Seip made his debut, on 15 October 2011, in a 2–0 loss against Hereford United. He scored his first goal for the club in a 2–2 draw at home to Morecambe, scoring the rebound after a James Hanson shot was blocked. Shortly scoring his first goal for the club, Seip signed a new deal with Bradford City, keeping him until the end of the season. Seip continued to become a regular in the first team until on 17 March 2012, Seip suffered a shoulder injury in a 1–0 loss against Aldershot Town. Having missed three games, Seip's shoulder injury ruled him out for the rest of the season. At the end of the season, Seip was released by the club.

=== VVV-Venlo ===
After being released, Seip signed for Eredivisie club VVV-Venlo, on 16 July 2012, returning him to his homeland after six-years abroad, having trained with the club on trial, since 3 July 2012. In the opening game of the season, Seip made his debut, in a 1–1 draw against Heracles Almelo; weeks later, Seip scored his first goal in a 4–2 loss against ADO Den Haag. Seip since then established himself in the first team, forming a central partnership with Ismo Vorstermans. Seip also scored three goals against RKC Waalwijk and SC Heerenveen (both fixtures in the league). Seip became the highest scoring defender in the Eredivisie and quickly established himself as a fans favourite due to his no nonsense approach to defending.

=== Central Coast Mariners ===
On 8 June 2013 Seip signed for reigning A-League Champions Central Coast Mariners on a three-year deal. He made his Mariners debut as a substitute in the first round of the 2013–14 A-League, coming on with ten minutes remaining in a draw with Western Sydney Wanderers. Seip scored his first goal for the Mariners in the 2014 AFC Champions League against Beijing Guoan. His volley in the 73rd minute was the only goal of the game. Seip left Central Coast Mariners after the end of the 2013/14 A-League season, well short of his initial 3-year deal due to a change of ownership at the club nullifying all player contracts, and not being offered a continuation of the original term.

=== FC Emmen ===
On 28 July 2014, Seip joined FC Emmen, signing a 2-year contract with an option for a third year.

== Personal life ==
Seip married his longtime girlfriend Lucy, daughter of former Plymouth Argyle chairman Paul Stapleton, on 13 June 2009 in Gunnislake. The couple have a son called Walter Paul Seip, who was born on 22 July 2010, and a son called Sidney, who was born on 9 June 2012, both in Plymouth. His wife gained a 2.1 law degree from the University of Plymouth in 2009.

== Career statistics ==
Appearances and goals by club, season and competition
Club	Season	League			Cup		League Cup		Continental		Other		Total	
Club	Season	Division	Apps	Goals	Apps	Goals	Apps	Goals	Apps	Goals	Apps	Goals	Apps	Goals
Veendam	1999–00	Eerste Divisie	9	0	0	0	—		—		—		9	0
Veendam	2000–01	Eerste Divisie	18	0	0	0	—		—		—		18	0
Veendam	Total		27	0	0	0	—		—		—		27	0
Heerenveen	2002–03	Eredivisie	6	0	0	0	—		0	0	—		6	0
Heerenveen	2003–04	Eredivisie	31	1	1	0	—		5	0	—		37	1
Heerenveen	2004–05	Eredivisie	30	1	1	0	—		6	0	—		37	1
Heerenveen	2005–06	Eredivisie	28	0	2	0	—		7	0	3	0	40	0
Heerenveen	Total		122	2	4	0	—		18	0	3	0	147	2
Plymouth Argyle	2006–07	Championship	37	2	5	0	0	0	—		—		42	2
Plymouth Argyle	2007–08	Championship	34	1	1	0	3	0	—		—		38	1
Plymouth Argyle	2008–09	Championship	41	3	1	0	0	0	—		—		42	3
Plymouth Argyle	2009–10	Championship	5	0	—		1	0	—		—		6	0
Plymouth Argyle	2010–11	League One	17	0	1	0	0	0	—		2	0	20	0
Plymouth Argyle	Total		134	6	8	0	4	0	—		2	0	148	6
Blackpool (loan)	2009–10	Championship	7	2	—		0	0	—		—		7	2
Sheffield United (loan)	2009–10	Championship	6	0	2	0	—		—		—		8	0
Charlton Athletic (loan)	2010–11	League One	0	0	—		—		—		—		0	0
Bradford City	2011–12	League Two	23	1	2	0	—		—		2	0	27	1
VVV-Venlo	2012–13	Eredivisie	31	5	1	0	—		—		2	0	34	5
Central Coast Mariners	2013–14	A-League	14	0	—		—		2	1	—		16	1
FC Emmen	2014–15	Eerste Divisie	22	1	0	0	—		—		2	0	24	1
FC Emmen	2015–16	Eerste Divisie	30	0	2	1	—		—		1	0	33	1
FC Emmen	Total		52	1	2	1	—		—		3	0	57	2
Career total			416	17	19	1	4	0	20	1	12	0	471	19
