= Gary Sawyer =

English footballer (born 1985)

Personal information
- Full name: Gary Dean Sawyer
- Date of birth: 5 July 1985 (age 41)
- Place of birth: Enfield, London, England
- Height: 6 ft 0 in (1.83 m)
- Positions: Centre-back; left-back

Senior career*
Years	Team	Apps	(Gls)
2002–2010	Plymouth Argyle	95	(5)
2004–2006	→ Exeter City (loan)	62	(2)
2010	→ Bristol City (loan)	2	(0)
2010–2012	Bristol Rovers	61	(0)
2012–2015	Leyton Orient	69	(1)
2015–2021	Plymouth Argyle	171	(1)
Total		461	(9)
- * Club domestic league appearances and goals

Gary Dean Sawyer (born 5 July 1985) is an English former professional footballer who played as a defender.

He started his career at Plymouth Argyle, and in-between spells at Home Park has also played for Leyton Orient, Weymouth, Exeter City, Bristol City, Bristol Rovers before ending his career back at Plymouth Argyle. Upon finishing his career at Plymouth, Gary joined local North Devon Football League team, Park United.

== Career ==
=== Early career ===
Sawyer was born in Enfield, London, moving to Bideford, Devon at a young age, and developed his football career in the youth system at Plymouth Argyle. In the 2003–04 season, Sawyer had a loan spell with Weymouth, during which he made only one appearance. He joined Conference club Exeter City on loan for the 2004–05 season, appearing regularly in the first team and playing in the club's FA Cup ties against Manchester United, and remained at the club for the following season.

Sawyer made his debut in the Football League on 8 August 2006, as a second-half substitute as Plymouth won 1–0 against Colchester United in the Football League Championship. He signed a two-and-a-half-year deal in November 2006, and made his first start for Argyle later that month at home to Luton Town. His performances during the season earned him Argyle's Young Player of the Season award for 2006–07 and a new three-year deal, contracting him to the club until 2010.

Sawyer went on to be a regular starter for the Pilgrims throughout the 2007–08 season, and scored his first goal for the club, against Colchester United on 4 March 2008.

==== Departure from Plymouth ====
He started the 09–10 season as a regular, notably scoring the winning goal in a 1–0 win away to Cardiff City on Boxing Day, before losing his place in February and March to new loan signing Rickard Eckersley. In March 2010, Sawyer joined fellow Championship club Bristol City on loan for the remainder of the 2009–10 season. Sawyer would play twice for City, in a 2–1 win against Derby County, and then a 1–1 draw with Blackpool. Out of contract at the end of the season, Sawyer had turned down the offer of a contract extension from Argyle, who had been relegated from the Championship to League One, and said he hoped to earn himself a permanent deal with Bristol City.

=== Bristol Rovers ===
On 30 June 2010, Sawyer joined League One Club Bristol Rovers on a two-year deal. He got his first sending off for the Pirates on 11 September 2010, against Brentford, with two bookable offences.

=== Leyton Orient ===
On 12 May 2012, Sawyer signed for Leyton Orient, again on a two-year deal. On 14 August 2012, he played first game for Leyton Orient, in 1–1 draw against Charlton Athletic at The Valley. He scored his first and only goal for the club against MK Dons in April 2013.

=== Return to Argyle ===
Sawyer returned to his first club, Plymouth Argyle on 25 June 2015, after being released by Leyton Orient following their relegation from League One. He was Derek Adams' first signing as Argyle manager. He played every minute at Wembley in Argyle's 2–0 defeat to AFC Wimbledon in the 2016 League Two play-off final.

Sawyer was named vice captain to Luke McCormick for the 2016–17 season. In April 2017, Sawyer scored a rare goal for the club in an 8–0 win against Witheridge F.C. for Argyle's South West Peninsula League team. Argyle were promoted from League Two to League One at the end of the season.

For the majority of the first half of the 2017-18 season, due to injuries to Luke McCormick, Sawyer wore the captain's armband for Argyle. On Boxing Day 2017 Sawyer scored his first competitive goal for Argyle since his return to the club, the only goal in a 1–0 win away against MK Dons.

He signed a one-year contract extension with Plymouth in June 2018, and with Luke McCormick being released, Sawyer was named club captain. He was once again offered a new one-year contract by Plymouth Argyle at the end of the 2018–19 season, following relegation from League One back to League Two.

For the 19–20 season, Sawyer was retained as captain by Argyle's new manager Ryan Lowe. Under Lowe's management, Sawyer played predominantly as the left-sided centre half in a back three. On 1 February 2020, he was shown the first red card of his Argyle career, being sent off in the 85th minute of a 1–0 win at home to Newport County, for a poorly timed challenge on Jordan Green. During his time suspended, he served in a coaching capacity for Argyle's U-23 side for a Premier League Cup game against Everton. In just his third game back from suspension he was sent off again, this time in the 40th minute of a 2–1 defeat away to Bradford City, for a similarly mistimed challenge on Dylan Connolly. After 35 starts and 1 substitute appearance across the season, Sawyer was offered a new one-year contract extension with the club, and signed it on 15 June 2020, following the club's promotion back to League One.

== Retirement ==
On 6 May 2021 Plymouth Argyle announced Gary Sawyer has been forced to retire from professional football due to injury at the age of 35 after managing just one appearance in the 2020–21 season. It was also announced that Sawyer would take up an ambassadorial role with Plymouth Argyle upon the expiration of his contract in the summer of 2021. The role would include "elements of coaching in the Pilgrims' new-look and ambitious Academy set-up, outreach work with the Argyle Community Trust, and specific club duties both on match-days and throughout the week".

== Career statistics ==
As of 12 July 2019

Appearances and goals by club, season and competition
Club	Season	League			Cups (Note: includes FA Cup, EFL Cup, EFL Trophy & FA Trophy)		Total	
Club	Season	Division	Apps	Goals	Apps	Goals	Apps	Goals
Plymouth Argyle
Plymouth Argyle	2006–07	Championship	22	0	4	0	26	0
Plymouth Argyle	2007–08	Championship	31	1	4	0	35	1
Plymouth Argyle	2008–09	Championship	13	3	0	0	13	3
Plymouth Argyle	2009–10	Championship	29	1	3	0	32	1
Plymouth Argyle	Total		95	5	11	0	106	5
Weymouth (loan)
Weymouth (loan)	2003–04	Southern Football League	1	0	0	0	1	0
Exeter City (loan)
Exeter City (loan)	2004–05	Conference National	32	2	7	0	39	2
Exeter City (loan)	2005–06	Conference National	30	0	3	0	33	0
Bristol City (loan)	2009–10	Championship	2	0	0	0	2	0
Loans total			65	2	10	0	75	2
Bristol Rovers
Bristol Rovers	2010–11	League One	37	0	5	0	42	0
Bristol Rovers	2011–12	League Two	24	0	3	0	27	0
Bristol Rovers	Total		61	0	8	0	69	0
Leyton Orient
Leyton Orient	2012–13	League One	34	1	8	0	42	1
Leyton Orient	2013–14	League One	22	0	6	0	28	0
Leyton Orient	2014–15	League One	13	0	5	0	18	0
Leyton Orient	Total		69	1	19	0	88	1
Plymouth Argyle
Plymouth Argyle	2015–16	League Two	46	0	4	0	50	0
Plymouth Argyle	2016–17	League Two	21	0	1	0	22	0
Plymouth Argyle	2017–18	League One	46	1	3	0	49	1
Plymouth Argyle	2018–19	League One	33	0	1	0	34	0
Plymouth Argyle	2019–20	League Two	25	0	4	0	29	0
Plymouth Argyle	2020–21	League One	0	0	1	0	1	0
Plymouth Argyle	Total		171	1	14	0	185	1
Career total			461	9	62	0	523	9

== Honours ==
Plymouth Argyle

- EFL League Two runner-up: 2016–17; promotion: 2019–20
