= Luke Summerfield =

English footballer (born 1987)

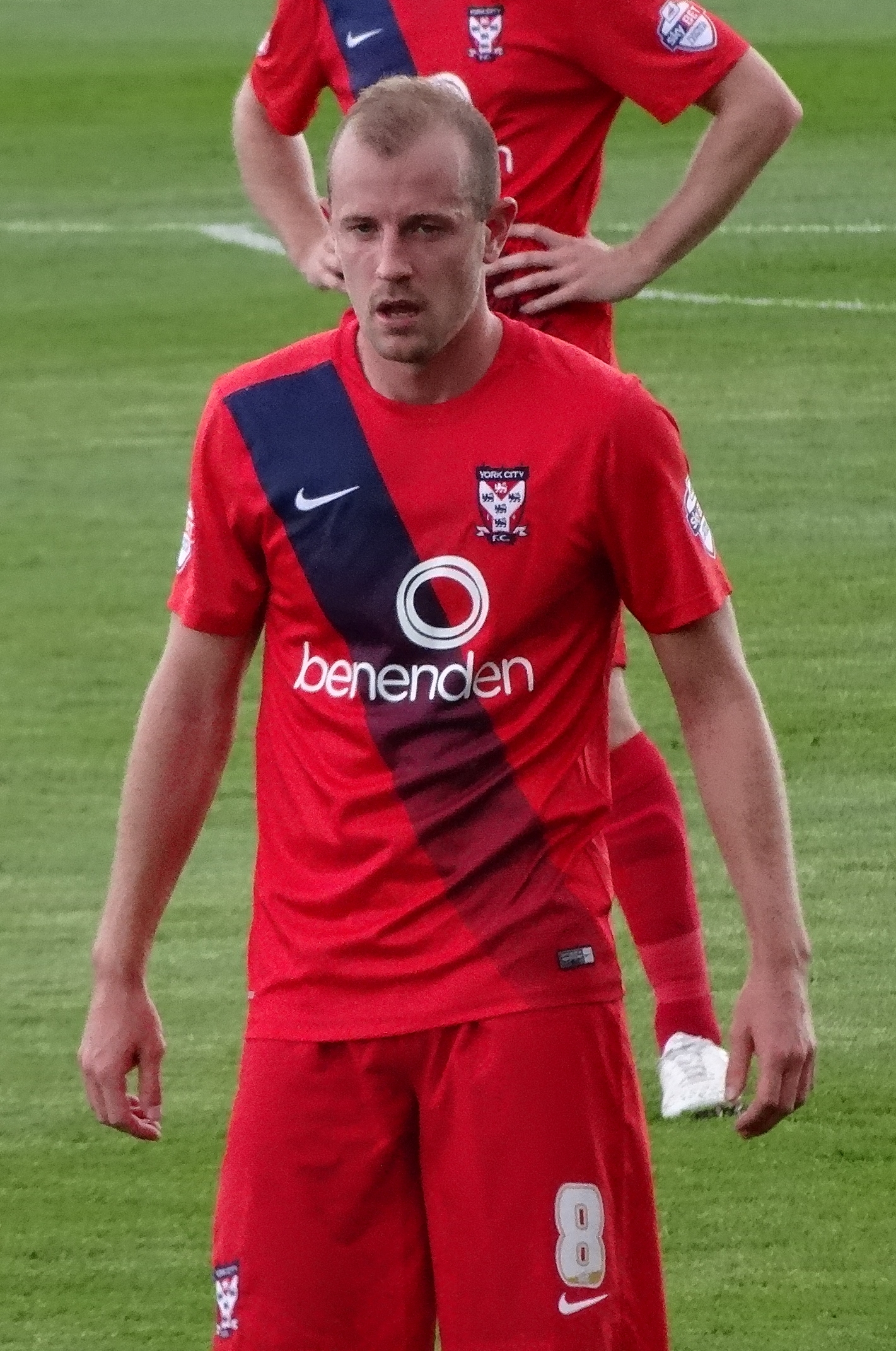
- Summerfield playing for York City in 2015

Personal information
- Full name: Luke John Summerfield
- Date of birth: 6 December 1987 (age 38)
- Place of birth: Ivybridge, England
- Height: 6 ft 0 in (1.83 m)
- Position: Central midfielder

Team information
- Current team: Chorley

Youth career
- 1998–2005: Plymouth Argyle

Senior career*
Years	Team	Apps	(Gls)
2005–2011	Plymouth Argyle	79	(4)
2007	→ AFC Bournemouth (loan)	8	(1)
2009	→ Leyton Orient (loan)	14	(0)
2011–2012	Cheltenham Town	41	(4)
2012–2014	Shrewsbury Town	64	(3)
2014–2016	York City	65	(11)
2016–2018	Grimsby Town	62	(1)
2017	→ Macclesfield Town (loan)	18	(0)
2018–2020	Wrexham	63	(3)
2020–2024	FC Halifax Town	99	(10)
2024–2025	Kidderminster Harriers	5	(0)
2025–	Chorley	0	(0)
- * Club domestic league appearances and goals as of 22.00, 26 August 2024 (UTC)

Luke John Summerfield (born 6 December 1987) is an English professional footballer who plays as a central midfielder for National League club Chorley. He has played in the English Football League for Plymouth Argyle, AFC Bournemouth, Leyton Orient, Cheltenham Town, Shrewsbury Town, York City and Grimsby Town.

== Early life ==
Summerfield was born in Ivybridge, Devon. His father, Kevin, is a former professional footballer and coach.

== Career ==
=== Plymouth Argyle ===
Summerfield joined the Plymouth Argyle Centre of Excellence aged 10. He made his first-team debut in the last match of the 2004–05 season, a 0–0 home draw with Leicester City on 8 May 2005, entering the match as a 77th minute substitute for David Worrell. He signed a two-year professional contract with Plymouth on 1 August 2005, before the start of 2005–06. He made two appearances in his first two seasons for Argyle (both as a substitute), once in the league and once in the League Cup. Summerfield made his debut for Argyle, as a substitute, on 8 May 2005, against Leicester City. On his first start for Argyle, against Colchester United in the Championship, on 8 August 2006, during 2006–07, Summerfield scored with a long-range volley. In January 2007, Summerfield was listed at number five in The Guardian's ten best prospects to watch out for in 2007. At the beginning of March 2007 he trained for a week with Premier League club Chelsea along with teammates Dan Gosling and Scott Sinclair.

Then Plymouth Argyle manager Ian Holloway said of Summerfield that "I see Luke doing things far beyond his tender years. The boy has a fine touch, he is typical of the talent that Plymouth will produce for the future." On 20 March 2007, Summerfield signed a loan deal with League One club AFC Bournemouth until the end of the season. On 25 September 2009, Summerfield moved to League One club Leyton Orient on a one-month loan, which was later extended to three months, before he returned to Plymouth on 19 December.

=== Cheltenham Town ===
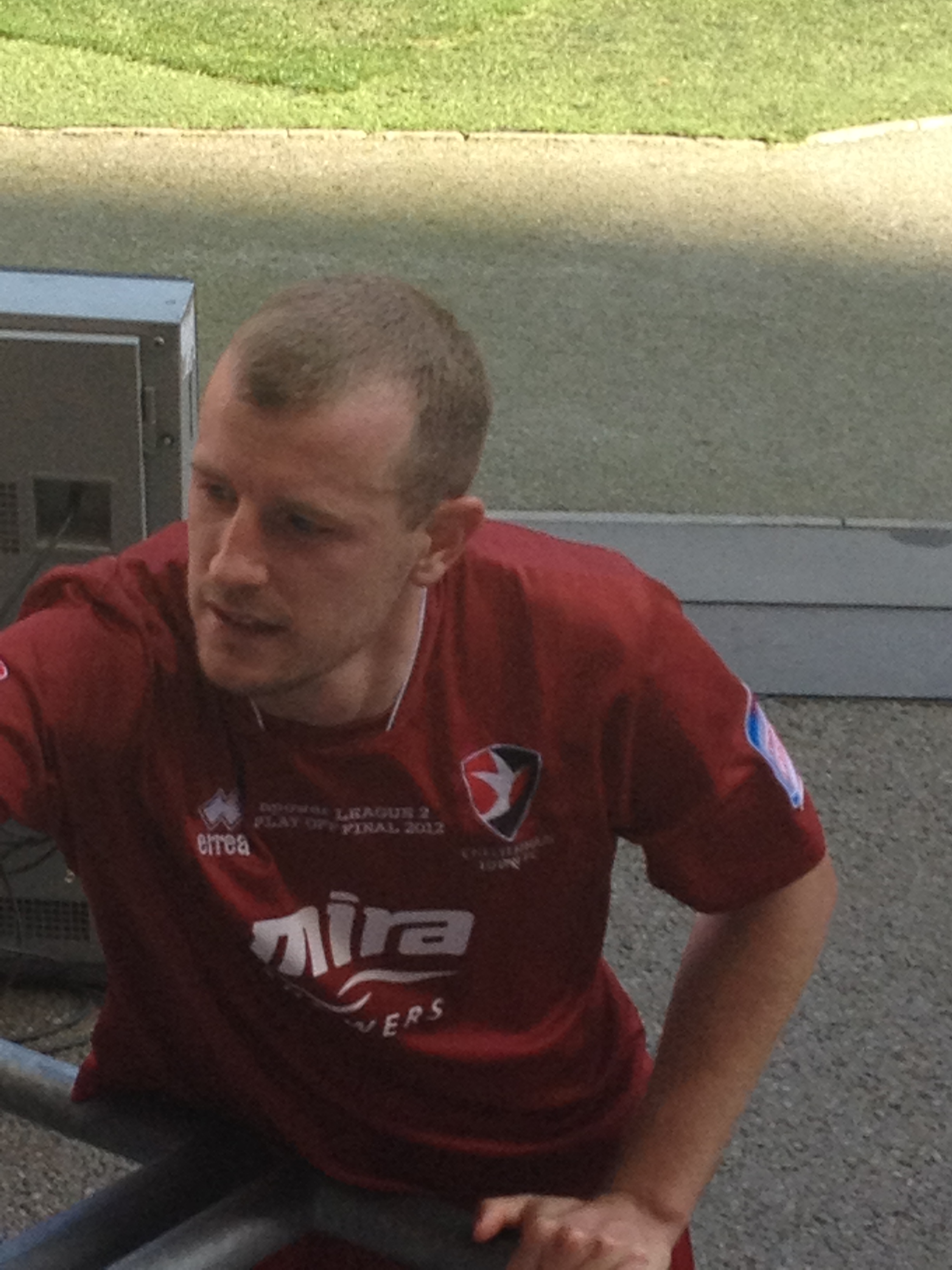
Summerfield after playing for Cheltenham Town in the 2012 League Two play-off final

Summerfield joined Shrewsbury Town on trial in July 2011 and played in a friendly against Manchester United, but he was not offered a contract and in August signed a one-year contract with Cheltenham Town. In July 2012, he rejected a new contract with the club.

=== Shrewsbury Town ===
Summerfield rejected a contract offer from Cheltenham Town to sign for League One club Shrewsbury Town on 3 July 2012. He scored his first goal for Shrewsbury in a 3–1 FA Cup defeat versus Hereford United at Edgar Street. He was released at the end of his contract in May 2014.

=== York City ===
Summerfield signed for League Two club York City on 30 June 2014 on a two-year contract. He made his debut in York's 1–1 away draw with Tranmere Rovers in the opening match of 2014–15 on 9 August 2014. He left York after rejecting a new contract in May 2016.

=== Grimsby Town ===
Summerfield signed a two-year contract with newly promoted League Two club Grimsby Town on 28 June 2016 on a free transfer. He scored his first goal for Grimsby in a 5–2 win against Stevenage on 27 August 2016.

On 6 February 2017, Summerfield joined National League club Macclesfield Town on loan until the end of 2016–17, with the option of a permanent transfer if Macclesfield were to earn promotion. He was offered a new contract by Grimsby at the end of the 2017–18 season, but left the club in June 2018 when it was withdrawn.

=== Wrexham ===
Summerfield signed for National League club Wrexham on 5 July 2018 on a one-year contract. He made his debut on 4 August on the opening day of the 2018–19 season, starting in a 1–0 away victory over Dover Athletic.

=== FC Halifax Town ===
On 20 August 2020, Summerfield signed for FC Halifax Town. On 11 January 2021, Summerfield was awarded with the league's Player of the Month award for December 2020.

=== Manchester United ===
In the summer of 2025 Luke announced his retirement from professional football and took up a position as assistant kit and equipment coordinator at Manchester United, working within the first team kit department.

== Career statistics ==
As of match played 20 March 2024

Appearances and goals by club, season and competition
Club	Season	League			FA Cup		League Cup		Other		Total	
Club	Season	Division	Apps	Goals	Apps	Goals	Apps	Goals	Apps	Goals	Apps	Goals
Plymouth Argyle	2004–05	Championship	1	0	0	0	0	0	—		1	0
Plymouth Argyle	2005–06	Championship	0	0	0	0	1	0	—		1	0
Plymouth Argyle	2006–07	Championship	23	1	3	0	0	0	—		26	1
Plymouth Argyle	2007–08	Championship	7	0	1	0	2	1	—		10	1
Plymouth Argyle	2008–09	Championship	29	2	1	0	1	0	—		31	2
Plymouth Argyle	2009–10	Championship	12	0	2	0	1	1	—		15	1
Plymouth Argyle	2010–11	League One	7	1	0	0	0	0	0	0	7	1
Plymouth Argyle	Total		79	4	7	0	5	2	0	0	91	6
AFC Bournemouth (loan)	2006–07	League One	8	1	—		—		—		8	1
Leyton Orient (loan)	2009–10	League One	14	0	—		—		1 (Note: Appearance in Football League Trophy)	0	15	0
Cheltenham Town	2011–12	League Two	41	4	3	1	1	1	6 (Note: Three appearances in Football League Trophy, three in League Two play-offs)	0	51	6
Shrewsbury Town	2012–13	League One	36	2	1	1	1	0	1	0	39	3
Shrewsbury Town	2013–14	League One	28	1	1	0	1	0	1	0	31	1
Shrewsbury Town	Total		64	3	2	1	2	0	2	0	70	4
York City	2014–15	League Two	31	4	1	0	0	0	1	0	33	4
York City	2015–16	League Two	34	7	0	0	2	1	0	0	36	8
York City	Total		65	11	1	0	2	1	1	0	69	12
Grimsby Town	2016–17	League Two	23	1	1	0	1	0	2 (Note: Appearance(s) in EFL Trophy)	1	27	2
Grimsby Town	2017–18	League Two	39	0	1	0	0	0	1	0	41	0
Grimsby Town	Total		62	1	2	0	1	0	3	1	68	2
Macclesfield Town (loan)	2016–17	National League	18	0	—		—		5 (Note: Appearances in FA Trophy)	2	23	2
Wrexham	2018–19	National League	33	1	4	1	—		3 (Note: Two appearances in FA Trophy, one in National League play-offs)	0	40	2
Wrexham	2019–20	National League	30	2	4	0	—		0	0	34	2
Wrexham	Total		63	3	8	1	0	0	3	0	74	4
FC Halifax Town	2020-21	National League	31	5	0	0	—		2 (Note: Appearances in FA Trophy)	1	33	6
FC Halifax Town	2021-22	National League	24	1	2	0	—		3 (Note: Appearances in FA Trophy)	1	29	2
FC Halifax Town	2022-23	National League	21	0	1	0	—		4 (Note: Appearances in FA Trophy)	0	26	0
FC Halifax Town	2023-24	National League	23	4	1	0	—		1 (Note: Appearance in FA Trophy)	0	25	4
FC Halifax Town	Total		99	10	4	0	—		10	2	113	12
Career total			513	37	27	3	11	4	31	5	582	49

== Honours ==
Macclesfield Town

- FA Trophy runner-up: 2016–17

FC Halifax Town

- FA Trophy: 2022–23
