= Romain Larrieu =

French footballer (born 1976)

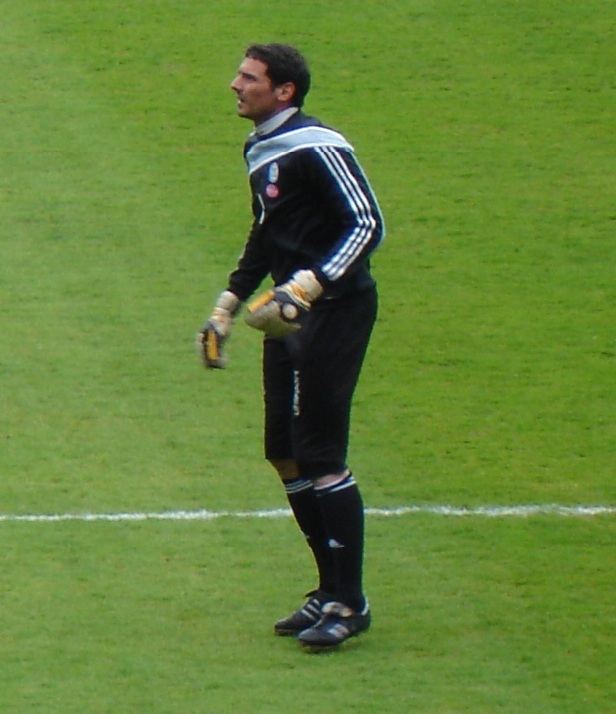
- Larrieu as a Plymouth Argyle player

Personal information
- Full name: Romain Larrieu
- Date of birth: 31 August 1976 (age 50)
- Place of birth: Mont-de-Marsan, France
- Height: 6 ft 3 in (1.91 m)
- Position: Goalkeeper

Senior career*
Years	Team	Apps	(Gls)
1994–1998	Montpellier	0	(0)
1998–2000	Valence	1	(0)
2000–2012	Plymouth Argyle	292	(0)
2007	→ Gillingham (loan)	14	(0)
2007	→ Yeovil Town (loan)	6	(0)
2013	Tiverton Town	0	(0)
2014	Camelford	1	(0)
Total		314	(0)

Managerial career
- 2012–2013: Plymouth Argyle (assistant manager)
- 2013: Plymouth Argyle (caretaker)
- * Club domestic league appearances and goals

Romain Larrieu (born 31 August 1976) is a French former professional footballer who played as a goalkeeper, most notably in the Football League for Plymouth Argyle. He started his career at Montpellier in 1994. After failing to make an appearance at Montpellier, he moved to Valence in 1998, where he played one match in the French Division 2. He joined Plymouth Argyle in 2000 staying at the club until 2012. During his time at Plymouth Argyle, he amassed almost 300 league appearances and went on loan twice, at Gillingham and Yeovil Town. Larrieu was last registered with semi-professional South West Peninsula League club Camelford in 2014.

== Playing career ==
=== Early career in France ===
Born in Mont-de-Marsan, Larrieu started his career in his native France at Montpellier, but finding it impossible to dislodge the experienced French international Bruno Martini, he decided to move on. His next club was ASOA Valence where he played with another future Plymouth Argyle player, David Friio, until their relegation into the French Third Division when Larrieu was released along with Friio in the summer of 2000.

=== Plymouth Argyle ===
Following a six-month break he was recommended to Plymouth Argyle's manager, Paul Sturrock and was signed on a one-month trial contract, making his debut on 6 December, in the Football League Trophy versus Bristol City. Having been signed as a back-up keeper, he played 14 league games following injury to regular goalkeeper Jon Sheffield and despite obvious rustiness and nerves he was rewarded with a permanent contract.

Larrieu was surprisingly made first choice for the 2001–02 season but this decision proved to be a masterstroke. Plymouth became champions of Division Three (now League 2) with Larrieu conceding only 28 goals, keeping 27 clean-sheets (a club record) and pulling off many a fine save. He was also named in the PFA Division Three team of the year. He was again first choice for the 2002–03 season as he became a fan favourite at Home Park. After that he was linked with a shock move to then Premiership champions Arsenal. But his 2003–04 season was cut short after 6 games after sustaining damaged knee ligaments. Argyle won promotion from Division 2 (now League 1) that season, and in 2004–05 he shared goalkeeping duties with Luke McCormick in the Championship.

The following 2005–06 season Larrieu resumed duties as first choice goalkeeper playing in 45 of the 46 league fixtures again putting in impressive displays. In the 2006–07 season, he suffered with testicular cancer, and after his recovery, he was allowed to go out on loan to Gillingham.

==== Gillingham loan ====
He made his debut for Gillingham in a 2–0 away defeat to Swansea City on 23 January 2007. What was originally intended to be a short-term loan was extended until mid-April, because of injury to Gillingham goalkeeper Kelvin Jack.

==== Yeovil Town loan ====
The 2007–08 season was another disappointment for Larrieu. With McCormick continuing to be the first choice goalkeeper, Larrieu was sent on loan to Yeovil Town for a month-long loan to cover for the injured Steve Mildenhall, where he made six appearances in the league for them.

==== Return to Plymouth Argyle ====
After some impressive form he returned to Plymouth and established himself as the number one goalkeeper until Christmas, where a second bout of ill health ended up ruling him out for the rest of the season, meaning he was only able to play 15 games for Plymouth all year.

Larrieu began the 2008–09 season behind former Arsenal man Graham Stack, but returned to the side in the 2–1 win at Watford and kept his place for the remainder of the season, proving to be as influential as ever in his 40 league appearances. In recognition of his performances throughout the season, Larrieu was voted as Plymouth Argyle Player of the Year by the club's supporters. As of the 2009–10 season he was appointed the club captain. Larrieu was sent off in the final game of the 2010-11 in English football season for deliberate handball. On 5 May 2012, Larrieu announced that the club's final match of the 2011–12 campaign against Cheltenham Town would be his last as a Plymouth Argyle player, allowing him to concentrate on his coaching duties.

=== Later career ===
At the beginning of the 2013–14 season it was rumoured that Larrieu was looking for a return to playing and appeared in a number trial matches and pre-season friendlies. He eventually signed for Tiverton Town to provide experienced cover, but did not make an appearance. In January 2014 Larrieu signed for South West Peninsula League club Camelford as cover for their regular 'keeper who was due to be unavailable for a short period. Larrieu played just one game for Camelford, a 4–0 loss to Torpoint Athletic.

== Coaching career ==
In September 2011, Larrieu was appointed first team player-coach to caretaker manager Carl Fletcher following the dismissal of Peter Reid on a temporary basis. The pair took over permanently in November. In May 2012, the club confirmed that Larrieu had signed a rolling 12-month contract to become the club's assistant manager. Larrieu served as caretaker manager for one game in January 2013 after Fletcher was sacked and continued as assistant manager when John Sheridan joined the club. He was released from his contract in May after more than 12 years of service to the club. Larrieu is now looking for offers from other clubs.

== Post-playing career ==
Now retired from playing, Larrieu retrained as a car mechanic, and in October 2015, was named as President of the Argyle Fans' Trust, a supporter group very highly respected by the Plymouth Argyle board.

== Career statistics ==
=== As a player ===
As of match played on 5 May 2012

Appearances and goals by club, season and competition
Club	Season	League			National Cup		League Cup		Other		Total	
Club	Season	Division	Apps	Goals	Apps	Goals	Apps	Goals	Apps	Goals	Apps	Goals
Montpellier	1996–97	French Division 1	0	0	0	0	0	0	0	0	0	0
Montpellier	1997–98	French Division 1	0	0	0	0	0	0	0	0	0	0
Montpellier	Total		0	0	0	0	0	0	0	0	0	0
ASOA Valence	1998–99	French Division 2	0	0	0	0	0	0	0	0	0	0
ASOA Valence	1999–2000	French Division 2	1	0	0	0	0	0	0	0	1	0
ASOA Valence	Total		1	0	0	0	0	0	0	0	1	0
Plymouth Argyle	2000–01	Third Division	15	0	0	0	0	0	2 (Note: Appearances in Football League Trophy)	0	17	0
Plymouth Argyle	2001–02	Third Division	45	0	4	0	1	0	1	0	51	0
Plymouth Argyle	2002–03	Second Division	43	0	4	0	1	0	0	0	48	0
Plymouth Argyle	2003–04	Second Division	6	0	0	0	1	0	0	0	7	0
Plymouth Argyle	2004–05	Championship	23	0	1	0	0	0	0	0	24	0
Plymouth Argyle	2005–06	Championship	45	0	1	0	0	0	0	0	46	0
Plymouth Argyle	2006–07	Championship	6	0	0	0	0	0	0	0	6	0
Plymouth Argyle	2007–08	Championship	15	0	0	0	0	0	0	0	15	0
Plymouth Argyle	2008–09	Championship	41	0	1	0	0	0	0	0	42	0
Plymouth Argyle	2009–10	Championship	25	0	2	0	1	0	0	0	28	0
Plymouth Argyle	2010–11	League One	18	0	1	0	1	0	2	0	22	0
Plymouth Argyle	2011–12	League Two	10	0	1	0	0	0	1	0	12	0
Plymouth Argyle	Total		292	0	15	0	5	0	6	0	318	0
Gillingham (loan)	2006–07	League One	14	0	0	0	0	0	0	0	14	0
Yeovil Town (loan)	2007–08	League One	6	0	0	0	0	0	1	0	7	0
Career total			313	0	15	0	5	0	7	0	340	0

=== As a manager ===
As of 5 June 2014.

Team	Nation	From	To	Record				
Team	Nation	From	To	G	W	D	L	Win %
Plymouth Argyle (Caretaker manager)	England	2 January 2013	6 January 2013	1	0	0	1	0.00
Total				1	0	0	1	0.00

== Honours ==
Plymouth Argyle

- Football League Second Division: 2003–04
- Football League Third Division: 2001–02

Individual

- PFA Team of the Year: 2001–02 Third Division
- Plymouth Argyle Player of the Year: 2008–09
