= Dan Smith (footballer, born 1989) =

British footballer (born 1989)

Personal information
- Full name: Daniel Philip Smith
- Date of birth: 5 October 1989 (age 37)
- Place of birth: Saltash, England
- Height: 5 ft 10 in (1.78 m)
- Position: Forward

Youth career
- 1999–2007: Plymouth Argyle

Senior career*
Years	Team	Apps	(Gls)
2007–2009	Plymouth Argyle	2	(0)
2008	→ Morecambe (loan)	2	(0)
2008–2009	→ Eastbourne Borough (loan)	13	(3)
2009–2010	Eastbourne Borough	15	(0)
2010	Weymouth		
2010–2012	Truro City		
2012	Bath City	3	(0)
2012–2013	Weymouth	37	(5)
2013–2014	Tiverton Town	39	(8)
2014–2015	Dorchester Town	44	(8)
2015–2016	Tiverton Town	39	(4)
2016	Weymouth	14	(1)
2016–2017	Truro City	15	(1)
- * Club domestic league appearances and goals

Daniel Philip Smith (born 5 October 1989) is an English former footballer who played as a forward for Plymouth Argyle, Morecambe, Eastbourne Borough, Truro City, Bath City, Weymouth and Tiverton.

== Career ==
Smith began his career at Plymouth Argyle's Centre of Excellence, having joined when he was a 9-year old. Smith made his first team debut for Argyle as a substitute in a Football League Championship match against Burnley in January 2008.

Smith also featured as a substitute in the final home game of the season against Blackpool before signing a new one-year contract in May 2008. He joined Morecambe on an initial one-month loan on 9 September 2008 to gain first team experience. Smith made two appearances for the Shrimps before returning to Argyle at the beginning of October.

With first team chances limited, Smith joined Conference National side Eastbourne Borough on 27 November 2008 for a one-month loan along with teammate Ashley Barnes. The loan was extended by a further three months which lasted until the end of February 2009. Smith made an impact for the Eastbourne Borough team, along with teammate Ashley Barnes, helped the team from balancing over the Conference National relegation zone to a comfortable mid table position with the scope of reaching the play-offs. In February 2009 when snow cut him off in Devon and took at flight to Manchester to join Eastbourne in an away game with Altrincham, a game that was called postponed two hours before kick off.

Smith scored three goals out of 14 games whilst playing for Eastbourne before returning to Plymouth Argyle at the end of February 2009.

Smith was released at the end of his contract and signed permanently for Eastbourne Borough on 15 May 2009. Smith stated that he jumped at the chance when Eastbourne were interested in signing him, despite other offers that were given to him. He believed that joining Eastbourne would kick-start his career again despite playing in non-League football. In February 2010, Smith signed for Conference South side Weymouth until the end of the season. He joined Truro City in July 2010 and helped the club win the Southern League in his first season. He was released in January 2012 to try and gain a full-time contract elsewhere.

Two months later, Smith joined Bath City on non-contract terms and made his debut the same day in a 1–0 defeat at Gateshead.

Smith signed for Southern Premier League side Weymouth in August 2012.

He joined Dorchester Town on 5 July 2014
