= David Norris (footballer) =

English footballer

Personal information
- Full name: David Martin Norris
- Date of birth: 20 February 1981 (age 45)
- Place of birth: Stamford, England
- Height: 5 ft 7 in (1.70 m)
- Position: Midfielder

Team information
- Current team: Daisy Hill

Senior career*
Years	Team	Apps	(Gls)
–1999	Stamford		
1999–2000	Boston United	26	(10)
2000–2002	Bolton Wanderers	0	(0)
2000–2001	→ Boston United (loan)	5	(4)
2002	→ Hull City (loan)	6	(1)
2002	→ Plymouth Argyle (loan)	7	(1)
2002–2008	Plymouth Argyle	219	(26)
2008–2011	Ipswich Town	106	(13)
2011–2012	Portsmouth	40	(8)
2012–2015	Leeds United	30	(3)
2015	Peterborough United	8	(0)
2015	Yeovil Town	1	(0)
2015–2016	Blackpool	38	(1)
2016	Leatherhead	1	(0)
2017	Salford City	3	(0)
2017–2018	Shaw Lane		
2018	Boston United	1	(0)
2018–2024	Lancaster City	124	(29)
2024–2025	Workington	10	(0)
2025–	Daisy Hill	0	(0)
- * Club domestic league appearances and goals as of 11:40, 5 July 2025 (UTC)

David Martin Norris (born 20 February 1981) is an English professional footballer who plays as a midfielder for North West Counties League Division One North club Daisy Hill.

Born in Stamford, he has played in the Football League for Hull City, Plymouth Argyle, Ipswich Town, Portsmouth, Leeds United, Peterborough United, Yeovil Town and Blackpool. Norris has made more than 400 Football League appearances.

== Club career ==
=== Early years ===
Having started his career at Southern League Midland Division club Stamford, Norris joined Boston United in 1999, who were playing one league higher at the time. He scored ten goals in 26 league appearances in his first season and one more in five cup matches. Boston won promotion to the Football Conference that season as Southern League Premier Division champions. Norris was transferred to First Division club Bolton Wanderers for a fee in excess of £50,000 in January 2000, which was a record transfer fee received by Boston at the time. He returned to Boston on loan in December and scored four goals in five league appearances. In March 2002, Norris joined Football League Third Division club Hull City on loan, where he played in six matches and scored once. In two and a half years with Bolton, he made one appearance in the FA Cup and four in the League Cup.

=== Plymouth Argyle ===
Norris initially joined Football League Second Division club Plymouth Argyle on loan for a month in October 2002. He scored the decisive goal on his debut in a 1–0 win at Crewe Alexandra, and made seven league appearances before joining the club permanently for an undisclosed fee in December. Argyle won promotion to the EFL Championship as Second Division champions in 2004 with Norris scoring five goals in 45 league appearances that season. He won the club's Player of the Year award in 2006 and, after more than five years at the club, Norris had made 243 appearances in all competitions, scoring 28 goals.

=== Ipswich Town ===
In the January 2008 transfer window Ipswich Town had two bids rejected by the Plymouth board despite Norris handing in a transfer request. Ipswich lodged one final, increased bid which was finally accepted after brokering a deal with Bolton that would allow Plymouth to receive more than the 50% Norris' clause initially gave them. Norris finally signed for Ipswich Town on 31 January 2008 for an undisclosed fee, signing a contract until 2011. He scored his first goal for the club in the 1–1 draw with Southampton away from home.

In November 2008, Norris was heavily criticised for a controversial goal celebration against Blackpool, interpreted as a show of support for jailed friend and former Plymouth goalkeeper Luke McCormick. McCormick was returning from Norris' wedding in June 2008 when he fell asleep at the wheel due to the effects of alcohol and caused the deaths of two young boys. He was sentenced to seven years and four months prison time in October of that year.

The family of the bereaved took offence at Norris' gesture and he was subsequently fined and warned by Ipswich. He was once again caught out when he told the Ipswich website he had not intended the celebration as a show of support to Luke McCormick and the statement was later changed by the club, adding further to the controversy. The statement now reads that the celebration was in fact a message to Luke McCormick. Later that week it was revealed that Norris was fined £25,000 by Ipswich and would make a face-to-face apology to Phil and Amanda Peak (the parents of the two boys).

Eventually, In August 2010, Norris became the Ipswich Town captain. Norris was handed the captain's armband by Manager Roy Keane after the departure of the then captain Jonathan Walters to Stoke City. In the summer of 2011 Norris turned down a new contract extension at Ipswich Town, with the club only prepared to offer him a two-year extension, a year short of the midfielders demands, with rival Championship club Leeds United heavily linked with signing him on a free transfer.

=== Portsmouth ===
On 15 June 2011, Norris signed for Portsmouth on a free transfer after turning down a new two-year deal with Ipswich. On 6 August, in his debut league appearance for Portsmouth, he scored against Middlesbrough in a game which ended 2–2. He scored his second goal for Portsmouth in a match away at West Ham United, which ended 4–3 to the home team. At first it was believed that Benjani Mwaruwari had scored the goal, but replays later showed that Norris had already put the ball over the line when Benjani headed in the rebound.

His first goal at Fratton Park came in a 2–0 home victory against Barnsley. With the match goalless, Karim Rekik headed the ball down to Norris, who controlled and then volleyed it into the net from the edge of the penalty area. On 7 April 2012, Norris scored a spectacular equalising goal against arch-rivals Southampton in the 93rd minute to secure Portsmouth a point.

=== Leeds United ===
In July 2012, Norris agreed the deal to join Leeds United from Portsmouth, to join his former teammates Jason Pearce, Luke Varney and Jamie Ashdown. Norris was allocated the number 19 shirt for the 2012–13 season on 3 August.

Norris made his competitive début for Leeds in the first game of the season against Shrewsbury Town in the League Cup on 11 August. Norris was also named the Leeds United captain for the match and also scored his first goal in the same game. Norris made his league début for Leeds in their 1–0 victory against Wolverhampton Wanderers. On 7 September, Norris was ruled out for a month after picking up a thigh injury, as a result of the injury, Leeds signed Michael Tonge on loan to help cover his absence. Norris made his first start since returning from injury against Charlton Athletic on 23 October, in the same game Norris scored his second goal of the season which was his first league goal for Leeds. Norris scored his third goal of the season for Leeds against Huddersfield Town to help earn Leeds a 4–2 victory on 1 December.

Norris missed the final three games of the season under new manager Brian McDermott due to a knee injury that required surgery, and on 15 August 2013, with Leeds needing to raise finances to help fund signings, he was made available for transfer alongside teammates El Hadji Diouf and Adam Drury.

Norris was out of favour throughout the 2013–2014 season under McDermott, making only one appearance in the League Cup. He featured in the development squad, but was also hampered by another knee injury that kept him out over the winter period.

Norris made his first appearance for Leeds in over a year in the last game of Head Coach Dave Hockaday against Bradford City in the League Cup, providing an assist for striker Matt Smith who opened the scoring in a 2–1 defeat on 27 August 2014.

He was finally released by Leeds United on 2 February 2015, when his contract was cancelled by mutual consent.

=== Peterborough United ===
Norris joined League One side Peterborough United on a short-term contract on 13 February 2015, until the end of the 2014–15 season. He was allocated the number 23 shirt for the club.

=== Yeovil Town ===
On 21 August 2015, Norris signed for League Two side Yeovil Town on non-contract terms, linking up with his former Plymouth manager Paul Sturrock. He made his only appearance in the 2–0 defeat against Oxford United, on 29 August 2015, and left the club on 1 September 2015.

=== Blackpool ===
Norris joined Blackpool on 3 September 2015, on a contract until the end of the season. He scored his first and only goal for Blackpool in a 5–0 win over Scunthorpe United on 16 January 2016.

=== Leatherhead ===
In September 2016 he signed for non-league Leatherhead.

=== Salford City ===
In February 2017 he signed for non-league Salford City.

=== Shaw Lane ===
In August 2017, Norris joined Shaw Lane.

=== Return to Boston ===
In September 2018, 18 years after initially leaving the club, Norris returned to Boston United.

=== Lancaster City ===
In December 2018 Norris signed for Northern Premier League club Lancaster City. His first appearance was on 1 December at North Ferriby United but North Ferriby left the league, with their record expunged in March 2019, so Norris's debut in real terms was the following week, when he appeared as a substitute in a home game against Gainsborough Trinity.

=== Daisy Hill ===
On 4 July 2025, Norris joined North West Counties Division One North side Daisy Hill.

== International career ==
Norris qualifies to play for the Republic of Ireland, through his mother, who has family in Kildare. Though he has never been selected to play for them, he was contacted by Steve Staunton (Ireland's former manager) about playing.

== Career statistics ==
As of end of 2024–25 season

Appearances and goals by club, season and competition
Club	Season	League			FA Cup		League Cup		Other		Total	
Club	Season	Division	Apps	Goals	Apps	Goals	Apps	Goals	Apps	Goals	Apps	Goals
Boston United	1999–2000	Southern League Premier Division	17	8	1	0	―		0	0	18	8
Bolton Wanderers	2000–01	First Division	0	0	0	0	2	0	0	0	2	0
Bolton Wanderers	2001–02	Premier League	0	0	1	0	2	0	―		3	0
Bolton Wanderers	Total		0	0	1	0	4	0	0	0	5	0
Boston United (loan)	2000–01	Conference	5	4	0	0	―		0	0	5	4
Boston United (loan)	Total		22	12	1	0	0	0	0	0	23	12
Hull City (loan)	2001–02	Third Division	6	1	0	0	0	0	0	0	6	1
Plymouth Argyle	2002–03	Second Division	33	6	3	0	0	0	0	0	36	6
Plymouth Argyle	2003–04	Second Division	45	5	1	0	1	0	1 (Note: Appearance in Football League Trophy)	0	48	5
Plymouth Argyle	2004–05	Championship	35	3	0	0	0	0	―		35	3
Plymouth Argyle	2005–06	Championship	45	2	1	0	1	0	―		47	2
Plymouth Argyle	2006–07	Championship	41	6	5	1	1	0	―		47	7
Plymouth Argyle	2007–08	Championship	27	5	1	0	2	0	―		30	5
Plymouth Argyle	Total		226	27	11	1	5	0	1	0	243	28
Ipswich Town	2007–08	Championship	9	1	0	0	0	0	―		9	1
Ipswich Town	2008–09	Championship	37	3	2	0	2	0	―		41	3
Ipswich Town	2009–10	Championship	24	1	1	0	0	0	―		25	1
Ipswich Town	2010–11	Championship	36	8	1	0	6	3	―		43	11
Ipswich Town	Total		106	13	4	0	8	3	0	0	118	16
Portsmouth	2011–12	Championship	40	8	1	0	1	0	―		42	8
Leeds United	2012–13	Championship	30	3	2	0	2	1	―		34	4
Leeds United	2013–14	Championship	0	0	0	0	1	0	―		1	0
Leeds United	2014–15	Championship	0	0	0	0	1	0	―		1	0
Leeds United	Total		30	3	2	0	4	1	0	0	36	4
Peterborough United	2014–15	League One	8	0	0	0	0	0	0	0	8	0
Yeovil Town	2015–16	League Two	1	0	0	0	0	0	0	0	1	0
Blackpool	2015–16	League Two	38	1	0	0	0	0	0	0	38	1
Lancaster City	2018–19	Northern Premier League Premier Division	18	2	0	0	—		0	0	18	2
Lancaster City	2019–20	Northern Premier League Premier Division	32	11	1	0	—		3 (Note: One appearance in FA Trophy, two appearances in Lancashire FA Challenge Trophy)	0	36	11
Lancaster City	2020–21	Northern Premier League Premier Division	6	3	1	0	—		1 (Note: Appearance(s) in FA Trophy)	0	8	3
Lancaster City	2021–22	Northern Premier League Premier Division	4	0	0	0	—		0	0	4	0
Lancaster City	2022–23	Northern Premier League Premier Division	34	7	4	0	—		2	1	40	8
Lancaster City	2023–24	Northern Premier League Premier Division	30	6	3	0	—		4 (Note: One appearance in FA Trophy, three appearances and one goal in Lancashire FA Challenge Trophy)	1	37	7
Lancaster City	Total		124	29	9	0	0	0	10	2	143	31
Workington	2024–25	Northern Premier League Premier Division	10	1	0	0	—		2	0	12	1
Career total			611	95	29	1	22	4	13	2	675	102

== Honours ==
Boston United

- Southern League Premier Division: 1999–2000

Plymouth Argyle

- Football League Second Division: 2003–04

Individual

- Plymouth Argyle Player of the Year: 2005–06
