= Paul Connolly (footballer) =

English footballer

- Connolly pictured in 2008

Personal information
- Full name: Paul Connolly
- Date of birth: 29 September 1983 (age 43)
- Place of birth: Liverpool, England
- Position: Right back

Senior career*
Years	Team	Apps	(Gls)
2000–2008	Plymouth Argyle	162	(1)
2002	→ Bideford (loan)	1	(0)
2008–2010	Derby County	61	(1)
2010	→ Sheffield United (loan)	7	(0)
2010–2013	Leeds United	58	(0)
2012	→ Portsmouth (loan)	4	(0)
2013	→ Preston North End (loan)	15	(0)
2013–2014	Millwall	4	(0)
2014	Crawley Town	7	(0)
2014–2015	Luton Town	4	(0)
2015–2016	Stockport County	28	(0)
2016–	Airbus UK Broughton	12	(0)
2016–2017	→ Bangor City (loan)	16	(1)
2017–2018	Bangor City	7	(0)
Total		386	(3)
- * Club domestic league appearances and goals

Paul Connolly (born 29 September 1983) is an English former professional footballer who plays as a right back. He played in the Football League for Plymouth Argyle, Derby County, Sheffield United, Leeds United, Portsmouth, Preston North End, Millwall, Crawley Town and Luton Town, and for Bangor City in the Welsh Premier League.

== Career ==
=== Plymouth Argyle ===
Connolly came through the youth ranks at Plymouth Argyle, and made his league debut in the final game of the 2000–01 season. Connolly was a first team regular from 2003 onwards, helping the team to gain promotion to the First Division in 2003–04. He scored his first and only goal for Plymouth against Norwich on 10 November 2007.

=== Derby County ===
Connolly's contract expired at the end of the 2007–08 season, and on 15 May 2008 he moved to Derby County on a free transfer. Connolly later revealed that "I was becoming stale, it's a lovely part of the world [Plymouth] but it's time to move on, the enjoyment was going... I left because I felt I was losing that edge, I've been in a comfort zone."

Connolly made his Derby debut as a substitute in an opening day home defeat to Doncaster Rovers. Despite initial being kept out of the starting line-up by Tyrone Mears, the latter's move to Marseille on loan ensure Connolly became the club's first choice right back and, later appointed team captain by manager Paul Jewell. He finished the season with 49 league and cup appearances, only behind Rob Hulse in terms of most appearances for the club during the 2008–09 campaign and scored one goal – a last minute header to equalise in a 1–1 draw with Burnley on 4 April. Connolly made his 200th career league appearance three weeks later in a 2–0 home defeat against Reading.

In August 2009, Robbie Savage was appointed Derby Captain by Nigel Clough, who had replaced Paul Jewell after he had resigned in December 2008. Clough stated that he wanted Connolly to "concentrate on his own game. (He) was quite relieved in some ways because it is a big responsibility, especially when you are at full-back and out of the action.". Although Connolly started the 2009–10 season as first choice right back he eventually fell down the pecking order as Clough deciding to bring in his own players and as a result bought in Premier League rightbacks from Fulham and Bolton Wanderers in the shape of Fredrik Stoor and Nicky Hunt respectively.

==== Sheffield United loan ====
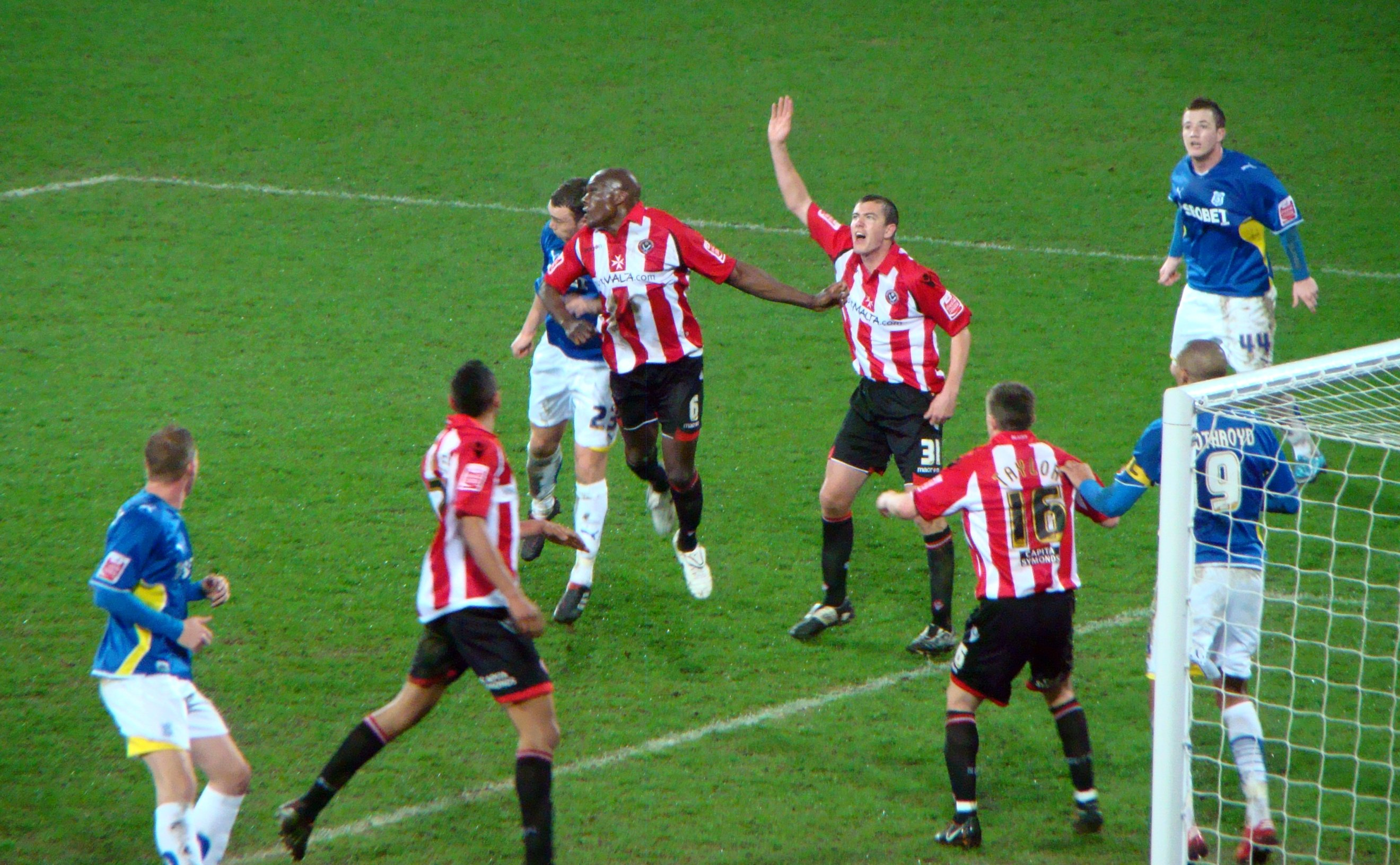
Connolly during his Blades loan spell.

To get some games under his belt Connolly joined Sheffield United on a monthlong emergency loan as defensive cover, making his debut the same evening in a 3–0 victory over Blackpool. The loan was initially extended for another week but, with it becoming mathematically impossible for Sheffield United to make the playoffs, he returned to Pride Park after having made seven appearances for The Blades.

=== Return to Derby ===
After returning to Derby, Connolly made the bench for the penultimate game of the season against Bristol City, coming on in the second half to make his first appearance in three months. Following the end of the season, Connolly was linked with moves to Leeds United and Sheffield United with Leeds agreeing a 3-year deal with the defender ahead of a medical on 2 June 2010.

=== Leeds United ===
On 10 June 2010, Leeds signed Connolly from Derby County on a free transfer. He joined on a three-year contract and was the third arrival of the summer, joining Kasper Schmeichel and Billy Paynter. Delighted United boss Simon Grayson said: "Paul brings plenty of experience and know-how to the squad." Connolly was given the number 2 shirt, displacing Jason Crowe who had previously occupied the shirt number. He made his Leeds debut in the first game of the season against his old club Derby County on 7 August 2010 which ended in a 2–1 defeat. Connolly missed his first game for Leeds when a hamstring injury ruled him out of the game against Doncaster Rovers. Manager Simon Grayson revealed in his pre match press conference against Sheffield United that Connolly would miss the match against Sheffield through injury, and also the matches against Preston and Ipswich. Connolly stepped up his comeback trail when he played for Leeds reserves against Scunthorpe reserves.

Connolly returned to Leeds' starting line-up after injury against Middlesbrough. On 8 January, Connolly helped earn Leeds a 1–1 draw against Arsenal, Leeds were 1–0 up when Robert Snodgrass scored a second half penalty, Arsenal equalised in the 90th minute when Cesc Fabregas scored a penalty. Connolly was ruled out for several games with injury and lost his place in the Leeds side to Eric Lichaj, however once Connolly recovered from injury he returned to the Leeds side and Lichaj was moved to the left back position.

Connolly started for Leeds the opening day of the season as they lost 3–1 against Southampton. Connolly was substituted against Bradford City and his replacement Tom Lees made an impressive impact, which meant that Connolly was dropped for the following matches.

After a spell out of the squad, Connolly returned to Leeds' starting 11 against Portsmouth on 1 October at right back with Tom Lees moving back into the centre back position, Leeds also kept their first clean sheet of the season in the same game. Connolly was sent off in Leeds' 2–0 defeat against Watford on 31 March 2012.

He was transfer listed by Neil Warnock at the end of the 2011–12 season. Connolly was allocated the number 24 shirt for the 2012–13 season on 3 August after previously having squad number 2 which means connolly may still have a future in the team.

After being placed on the transfer list and falling behind Lee Peltier and Sam Byram in the pecking order, Connolly joined Portsmouth on a one-month loan on 18 August.

On 15 January 2013, whilst still being transfer listed by Leeds United, it was announced that Connolly had joined Preston North End on loan.

Connolly left Leeds following the expiry of his contract at the end of the 2012–13 season. Following his release, Connolly was linked with a move to MLS side New York Red Bulls.

=== Millwall ===
On 12 September 2013, Connolly joined Championship side Millwall on a short-term deal running until January 2014. Two days later, on 14 September 2013, Connolly made his debut, playing in the right-back, in a 5–1 loss against Derby County. After five months at the club, Connolly was released.

=== Crawley Town ===
On 18 February 2014, Connolly joined Crawley Town on a deal until the end of the 2013–14 season.

In a match against Brentford, on 8 April 2014, Connolly was involved with an incident the opposition supporter and slapped the supporter. The incident led The FA investigate the incident. Connolly was charged by the FA and received a five match ban suspension, which kept him for the remainder of the season. At the end of the 2013–14 season, Connolly was among eleven players to be released by the club.

=== Luton Town ===
On 5 July 2014, Connolly signed for League Two club Luton Town on a one-year contract. He played in only six games in all competitions for the club, struggling with fitness and injuries throughout the season. He was released early from his contract in April 2015.

=== Stockport County ===
In August 2015, Connolly signed for Stockport County, having previously been a free agent.

=== Airbus UK Broughton ===
In June 2016, Connolly signed for Cymru Premier side Airbus UK Broughton. In November 2016, he signed on loan for Bangor City.

=== Bangor City ===
Connolly signed permanently for Bangor City in the January transfer window.

== Honours ==
Plymouth Argyle

- Football League Second Division: 2003–04
