= Paul Stapleton =

Paul Stapleton was a British accountant, businessman, and football administrator who the chairman of Plymouth Argyle from August 2001 to July 2009, and was a director of the club between 1998 and 2010.

== Career ==
In August 2001, Stapleton succeeded Dan McCauley as chairman of Plymouth Argyle, heading a consortium of local businessmen each with an equal share in the club.

Stapleton's tenure saw Argyle win two championships, in 2001/02 and 2003/04, which took them from the fourth division of English football to the second. Stapleton also presided over the Board's purchase of the freehold of Argyle's ground, Home Park, from Plymouth City Council in early 2007. During Stapleton's 11 years as Director then Chairman Plymouth Argyle had five managers, two caretaker managers, and broke the transfer record four times, rebuilt three-quarters of Home Park and purchased the freehold of the stadium.

In July 2009, Stapleton stepped down as the club's chairman following the completion of a takeover by a consortium led by Sir Roy Gardner.

In July 2020 he took over as chairman at Tavistock. He stood down in June 2022.
