= Krisztián Tímár =

Hungarian footballer

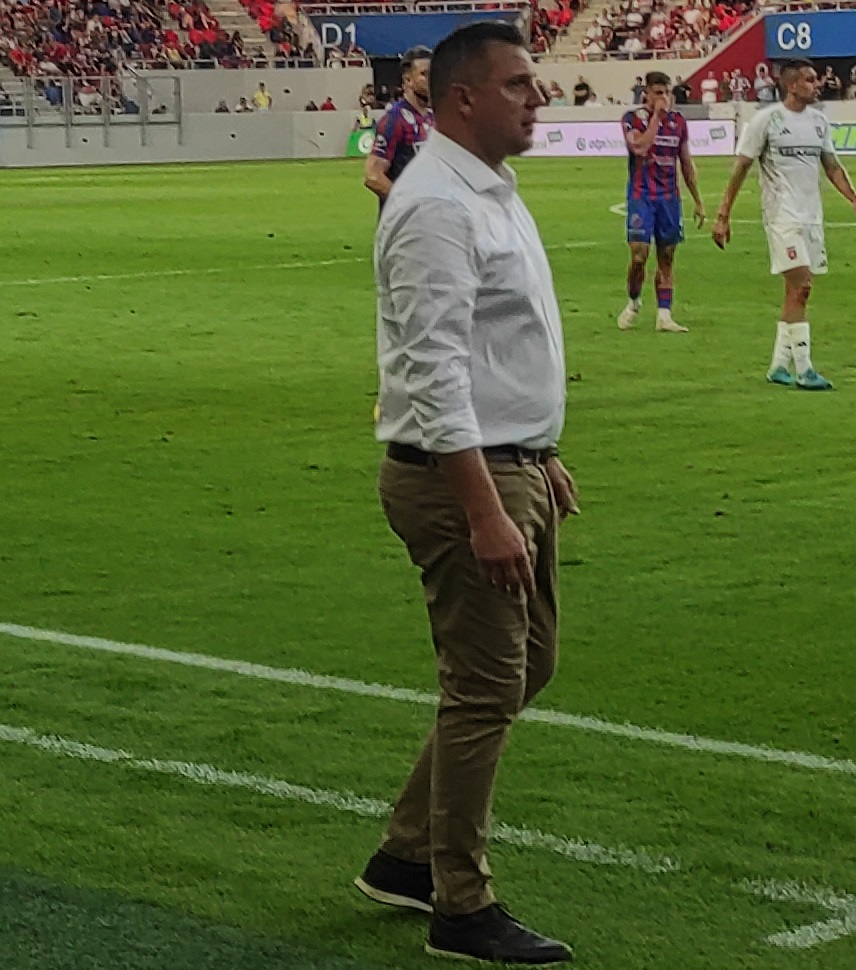
- Tímár with Nyíregyháza in 2024

Personal information
- Full name: Krisztián Tímár
- Date of birth: 4 October 1979 (age 47)
- Place of birth: Budapest, Hungary
- Height: 1.88 m (6 ft 2 in)
- Position: Centre back

Team information
- Current team: Kecskemét (manager)

Youth career
- 1995–1997: Ferencváros
- 1997–1999: MTK

Senior career*
Years	Team	Apps	(Gls)
1999–2001	BKV Előre	63	(8)
2001–2003	Videoton	46	(4)
2003	Jokerit	12	(1)
2003–2004	Tatabánya		
2004–2005	Nyíregyháza	12	(0)
2005–2007	Ferencváros	36	(6)
2007	→ Plymouth Argyle (loan)	9	(1)
2007–2011	Plymouth Argyle	75	(4)
2010	→ Oldham Athletic (loan)	2	(0)
2011–2012	SHB Đà Nẵng	21	(2)
2013	Siófok	20	(1)
2014	Szeged	4	(0)
Total		300	(27)

International career
1996–1997	Hungary U17	12	(1)
2008–2009	Hungary	4	(0)

Managerial career
- 2015–2017: Szeged-Csanád (youth)
- 2017–2020: Fehérvár II
- 2020–2021: Hungary U-18
- 2021–2022: Hungary U-19
- 2022–2023: Győr
- 2023–2025: Nyíregyháza
- 2025: Fehérvár
- 2025–: Kecskemét
- * Club domestic league appearances and goals

Krisztián Tímár (born 4 October 1979) is a Hungarian professional football manager and former player, who is currently the manager of Nemzeti Bajnokság II club Kecskemét.

He played in Nemzeti Bajnokság I for Videoton, Nyíregyháza Spartacus, Ferencváros and Siófok, and the Football League for Plymouth Argyle and Oldham Athletic. Tímár was capped four times by the Hungary national team.

== Playing career ==
Born in Budapest, Timár began his career with Ferencváros in 1995 before having two-year spells with MTK Hungária and BKV Előre. He spent the next four-years with four clubs in two countries before returning to his first club, Ferencváros. In early January 2007 his form for them attracted interest from Plymouth Argyle and he signed on loan for the Pilgrims for the remainder of the 2006–07 season, with compatriot Péter Halmosi. He made a great start to his loan period with a debut goal in the 2–2 draw with Wolves at Molineux.

The duo impressed and they both joined the club permanently in May 2007. During his time with the club Timár has built up a cult following, with his no-nonsense approach and 100% commitment endearing him greatly to the Argyle supporters who nicknamed him "The Beast" or "The Timarnator". Timár was voted as the club's Player of the Year for the 2007–08 season in April 2008 before he suffered an horrific head injury in the final game of the season at Wolves. He signed a new three-year contract, with the option of a fourth, in July 2008.

Upon his return he endured a frustrating 2008–09 season, losing his place in the team to Craig Cathcart. He made just 22 appearances, with 8 of them coming as a substitute, which prompted then manager Paul Sturrock to challenge him to put the season behind him and rediscover his form of 2007–08. He began the 2009–10 season strongly with a goal against Crystal Palace but soon found himself out of the team again, and upon the opening of the January transfer window he was sent out on-loan to Oldham Athletic for a month by Paul Mariner in order to gain first-team football.

In December 2011, Timár signed with Vietnamese V-League club SHB Đà Nẵng and V-league 2012 Champion .

== International career ==
Timár represented his country at youth level and was called up to the Hungarian senior team for the first time in March 2008 for the match against Slovenia. He made his long-awaited full international debut in that game as part of the starting eleven. He made his fourth appearance for the Magyars against Sweden in September 2009.

== Coaching career ==
Timár was hired as a manager of Győr on 30 June 2022 on a two-year deal.

On 7 April 2025, he was sacked the coach of Nyíregyháza.

On 27 August 2025, Tímár signed a contract as manager of Nemzeti Bajnokság II side Kecskemét.

== Honours ==
Plymouth Argyle

- Player of the Year: 2007–08

Individual

- Nemzeti Bajnokság I Manager of the Month: September 2024
