= 1991–92 Plymouth Argyle F.C. season =

English football club season

Plymouth Argyle
1991–92 season
- Chairman: Dan McCauley
- Manager: David Kemp (until 28 February); Gordon Nisbet/Alan Gillett (caretakers 28 February - 2 March); Peter Shilton (from 2 March)
- Stadium: Home Park
- Second Division: 22nd (relegated)
- FA Cup: Third round
- League Cup: First round
- Full Members Cup: Quarter finals
- Top goalscorer: League: Marshall (14); All: Marshall (15)
- Average home league attendance: 6,738
Home colours

During the 1991–92 English football season, Plymouth Argyle F.C. competed in the Football League Second Division.

== Season summary ==
In the 1991–92 season, businessman Dan McCauley became Plymouth's new chairman, and his first major decision was to sack David Kemp and appoint England's record cap holder Peter Shilton as player-manager. Shilton though was unable to prevent relegation as Argyle finished 22nd in Division Two.

== Final league table ==
| Pos | Team | Pld | W | D | L | GF | GA | GD | Pts | Qualification or relegation |
|---|---|---|---|---|---|---|---|---|---|---|
| 20 | Newcastle United | 46 | 13 | 13 | 20 | 66 | 84 | −18 | 52 | Qualification for the First Division (Note: From the 1992–93 season, the first tier became the Premier League, the second tier - then known as the Second Division - was renamed to the First Division, and the third tier - then known as the Third Division - was renamed to the Second Division.) |
| 21 | Oxford United | 46 | 13 | 11 | 22 | 66 | 73 | −7 | 50 | Qualification for the First Division |
| 22 | Plymouth Argyle (R) | 46 | 13 | 9 | 24 | 42 | 64 | −22 | 48 | Relegation to the Second Division |
| 23 | Brighton & Hove Albion (R) | 46 | 12 | 11 | 23 | 56 | 77 | −21 | 47 | Relegation to the Second Division |
| 24 | Port Vale (R) | 46 | 10 | 15 | 21 | 42 | 59 | −17 | 45 | Relegation to the Second Division |

Rules for classification: 1) Points; 2) Goal difference; 3) Goals scored
(R) Relegated

== Results ==
Plymouth Argyle's score comes first

=== Legend ===
| Win | Draw | Loss |

=== Football League Second Division ===
| Date | Opponent | Venue | Result | Attendance | Scorers |
|---|---|---|---|---|---|
| 17 August 1991 | Barnsley | H | 2–1 | 6,352 | Marshall, Turner |
| 24 August 1991 | Leicester City | A | 0–2 | 11,852 | |
| 31 August 1991 | Millwall | H | 3–2 | 5,369 | Marshall, Burrows, Wood (own goal) |
| 4 September 1991 | Newcastle United | A | 2–2 | 19,543 | Salman, Marshall |
| 7 September 1991 | Charlton Athletic | H | 0–2 | 5,602 | |
| 14 September 1991 | Grimsby Town | A | 1–2 | 5,432 | Burrows |
| 17 September 1991 | Southend United | A | 1–2 | 4,585 | Marshall |
| 21 September 1991 | Middlesbrough | H | 1–1 | 5,280 | Burrows |
| 28 September 1991 | Oxford United | A | 2–3 | 3,726 | Fiore, Barlow |
| 5 October 1991 | Swindon Town | H | 0–4 | 6,208 | |
| 12 October 1991 | Blackburn Rovers | A | 2–5 | 10,830 | Marshall, Barlow |
| 19 October 1991 | Bristol Rovers | A | 0–0 | 5,049 | |
| 26 October 1991 | Watford | H | 0–1 | 4,090 | |
| 2 November 1991 | Wolverhampton Wanderers | H | 1–0 | 4,200 | Marshall |
| 5 November 1991 | Bristol City | A | 0–2 | 7,735 | |
| 8 November 1991 | Tranmere Rovers | A | 0–1 | 7,490 | |
| 16 November 1991 | Port Vale | H | 1–0 | 4,363 | Marshall |
| 23 November 1991 | Sunderland | H | 1–0 | 6,007 | Fiore |
| 30 November 1991 | Brighton & Hove Albion | A | 0–1 | 6,713 | |
| 7 December 1991 | Ipswich Town | H | 1–0 | 4,986 | Fiore |
| 20 December 1991 | Newcastle United | H | 2–0 | 5,048 | Regis, Barlow |
| 26 December 1991 | Cambridge United | A | 1–1 | 7,105 | Turner |
| 28 December 1991 | Millwall | A | 1–2 | 6,980 | Morgan |
| 1 January 1992 | Portsmouth | H | 3–2 | 8,887 | Turner, Morrison, Marshall |
| 11 January 1992 | Leicester City | H | 2–2 | 5,846 | Witter, Fiore |
| 18 January 1992 | Barnsley | A | 3–1 | 5,322 | Marshall (3) |
| 1 February 1992 | Bristol Rovers | H | 0–0 | 6,631 | |
| 4 February 1992 | Portsmouth | A | 1–4 | 10,467 | Regis |
| 8 February 1992 | Watford | A | 0–1 | 7,260 | |
| 11 February 1992 | Cambridge United | H | 0–1 | 4,290 | |
| 22 February 1992 | Brighton & Hove Albion | H | 1–1 | 5,259 | Smith |
| 29 February 1992 | Ipswich Town | A | 0–2 | 12,852 | |
| 7 March 1992 | Derby County | H | 1–1 | 8,864 | Morrison |
| 10 March 1992 | Bristol City | H | 1–0 | 9,734 | Marshall |
| 14 March 1992 | Wolverhampton Wanderers | A | 0–1 | 11,556 | |
| 21 March 1992 | Tranmere Rovers | H | 1–0 | 7,447 | Morgan |
| 24 March 1992 | Derby County | A | 0–2 | 13,799 | |
| 28 March 1992 | Port Vale | A | 0–1 | 5,310 | |
| 31 March 1992 | Grimsby Town | H | 1–2 | 6,274 | McCall |
| 4 April 1992 | Charlton Athletic | A | 0–0 | 6,787 | |
| 11 April 1992 | Southend United | H | 0–2 | 7,060 | |
| 16 April 1992 | Sunderland | A | 1–0 | 28,813 | Marshall |
| 18 April 1992 | Middlesbrough | A | 1–2 | 15,086 | Marshall |
| 20 April 1992 | Oxford United | H | 3–1 | 9,735 | Morrison, Marker, Lee |
| 25 April 1992 | Swindon Town | A | 0–1 | 10,463 | |
| 2 May 1992 | Blackburn Rovers | H | 1–3 | 17,459 | Smith |

=== FA Cup ===
| Round | Date | Opponent | Venue | Result | Attendance | Goalscorers |
|---|---|---|---|---|---|---|
| R3 | 5 January 1992 | Bristol Rovers | A | 0–5 | 6,767 | |

=== League Cup ===
| Round | Date | Opponent | Venue | Result | Attendance | Goalscorers |
|---|---|---|---|---|---|---|
| R1 1st Leg | 20 August 1991 | Shrewsbury Town | A | 1–1 | 2,152 | Morrison |
| R1 2nd Leg | 27 August 1991 | Shrewsbury Town | H | 2–2 (lost on away goals) | 3,580 | Barlow, Turner |

=== Full Members Cup ===
| Round | Date | Opponent | Venue | Result | Attendance | Goalscorers |
|---|---|---|---|---|---|---|
| SR1 | 1 October 1991 | Portsmouth | H | 1–0 | 2,303 | Turner |
| SR2 | 22 October 1991 | Millwall | H | 4–0 | 2,022 | Fiore, Marker, Evans, Marshall |
| SQF | 26 November 1991 | Southampton | H | 0–1 | 5,578 | |

== Squad ==
Note: Flags indicate national team as defined under FIFA eligibility rules; some limited exceptions apply. Players may hold more than one non-FIFA nationality.

| Pos. | Nation | Player |
|---|---|---|
| GK | ENG | Peter Shilton |
| GK | WAL | Rhys Wilmot |
| GK | ENG | Dave Walter |
| DF | ENG | Adrian Burrows |
| DF | WAL | Andy Clement |
| DF | ENG | Ryan Cross |
| DF | ENG | Marc Edworthy |
| DF | WAL | Jeff Hopkins (on loan from Crystal Palace) |
| DF | ENG | David Lee (on loan from Chelsea) |
| DF | ENG | Nicky Marker |
| DF | ENG | Steve Morgan |
| DF | SCO | Andy Morrison |
| DF | WAL | Jason Rowbotham |
| DF | ENG | Danis Salman |
| DF | ENG | Tony Spearing |
| DF | NED | Eric van Rossum |
| DF | ENG | Tony Witter (on loan from Millwall) |

| Pos. | Nation | Player |
|---|---|---|
| MF | ENG | Martin Barlow |
| MF | ENG | Mark Damerell |
| MF | ENG | Mark Fiore |
| MF | ENG | Darren Garner |
| MF | ENG | Kevin Hodges |
| MF | ENG | Steve McCall |
| MF | WAL | Michael Meaker (on loan from QPR) |
| MF | ENG | Mark Quamina |
| MF | ENG | Dave Smith |
| FW | ENG | Paul Adcock |
| FW | IRL | Mickey Evans |
| FW | ENG | Stephen Jones |
| FW | JAM | Dwight Marshall |
| FW | ENG | Kevin Nugent |
| FW | ENG | Owen Pickard |
| FW | ENG | Dave Regis |
| FW | WAL | Morrys Scott |
| FW | ENG | Robbie Turner |
