= 2000–01 Plymouth Argyle F.C. season =

English football club season

Plymouth Argyle
2000–01 season
- Chairman: Dan McCauley
- Manager: Kevin Hodges; Paul Sturrock
- Stadium: Home Park
- Third Division: 12th
- FA Cup: First round
- League Cup: First round
- Football League Trophy: Second round
Home colours

The 2000–01 season was the 88th competitive season in the history of Plymouth Argyle Football Club.

== Third Division ==
=== Matches ===
12 August 2000 1	Plymouth Argyle	0–1	Leyton Orient	Home Park, Plymouth
15:00 BST		Report	Griffiths 27'	Attendance: 5,649; Referee: Paul Armstrong

19 August 2000 2	Hull City	1–1	Plymouth Argyle	Boothferry Park, Hull
15:00 BST	Whitmore 16'	Report	Gritton 90'	Attendance: 5,431; Referee: Anthony Bates

26 August 2000 3	Plymouth Argyle	2–0	Mansfield Town	Home Park, Plymouth
15:00 BST	Hicks 52' (o.g.); McGregor 71'	Report		Attendance: 4,069; Referee: Bill Jordan

29 August 2000 4	Darlington	1–0	Plymouth Argyle	Feethams, Darlington
19:30 BST	Kaak 4'	Report		Attendance: 4,415; Referee: Paul Robinson

2 September 2000 5	Plymouth Argyle	0–1	Macclesfield Town	Home Park, Plymouth
15:00 BST		Report	Barker 84'	Attendance: 3,888; Referee: Mike North

9 September 2000 6	Southend United	2–2	Plymouth Argyle	Roots Hall, Southend
15:00 BST	Fitzpatrick 9'; Houghton 73'	Report	McCarthy 13'; McGregor 38'	Attendance: 3,417; Referee: David Crick

12 September 2000 7	Shrewsbury Town	4–1	Plymouth Argyle	Gay Meadow, Shrewsbury
19:45 BST	McCarthy 9' (o.g.); Jemson 44', 65'; Brown 53'	Report	Peake 67'	Attendance: 2,361; Referee: Brian Curson

16 September 2000 8	Plymouth Argyle	2–0	Carlisle United	Home Park, Plymouth
15:00 BST	McCarthy 9'; Peake 17'	Report		Attendance: 3,378; Referee: Steve Dunn

23 September 2000 9	Cheltenham Town	5–2	Plymouth Argyle	Whaddon Road, Cheltenham
15:00 BST	Griffin 8'; Devaney 24', 41', 79' (pen.); Howells 36'	Report	McCarthy 45'; Mardon 55'	Attendance: 3,665; Referee: Phil Joslin

30 September 2000 10	Plymouth Argyle	2–3	Barnet	Home Park, Plymouth
15:00 BST	McCarthy 45'; Guinan 79'	Report	Richards 49', 59'; Arber 71'	Attendance: 3,423; Referee: Mark Cooper

7 October 2000 11	Chesterfield	2–1	Plymouth Argyle	Saltergate, Chesterfield
12:30 BST	Parrish 38'; Reeves 61' (pen.)	Report	McGregor 47'	Attendance: 4,285; Referee: Colin Webster

14 October 2000 12	Plymouth Argyle	2–0	Blackpool	Home Park, Plymouth
15:00 BST	Wotton 58' (pen.); McGregor 86'	Report		Attendance: 3,651; Referee: Mark Warren

17 October 2000 13	Plymouth Argyle	1–0	Scunthorpe United	Home Park, Plymouth
19:45 BST	McGregor 45'	Report		Attendance: 3,437; Referee: Peter Walton

21 October 2000 14	Hartlepool United	1–1	Plymouth Argyle	Victoria Park, Hartlepool
15:00 BST	Kevin Henderson 22'	Report	Nancekivell 69'	Attendance: 2,581; Referee: Eddie Wolstenholme

24 October 2000 15	Brighton & Hove Albion	2–0	Plymouth Argyle	Withdean Stadium, Brighton
19:45 BST	Carpenter 37'; Zamora 85'	Report		Attendance: 6,724; Referee: Rob Harris

4 November 2000 16	Torquay United	1–1	Plymouth Argyle	Plainmoor, Torquay
12:00 GMT	Williams 63'	Report	McCarthy 5'	Attendance: 3,936; Referee: Paul Danson

2 December 2000 17	Exeter City	0–2	Plymouth Argyle	St James Park, Exeter
13:00 GMT		Report	McCarthy 47', 75'	Attendance: 5,145; Referee: Paul Durkin

16 December 2000 18	Plymouth Argyle	1–0	York City	Home Park, Plymouth
15:00 GMT	Taylor 3'	Report		Attendance: 3,830; Referee: Mike Jones

23 December 2000 19	Halifax Town	2–0	Plymouth Argyle	The Shay, Halifax
15:00 GMT	Stoneman 6'; Kerrigan 65'	Report		Attendance: 1,670; Referee: Jeff Winter

26 December 2000 20	Plymouth Argyle	2–1	Cardiff City	Home Park, Plymouth
12:00 GMT	McCarthy 74', 86'	Report	Fortune-West 15'	Attendance: 8,543; Referee: David Crick

6 January 2001 21	Mansfield Town	0–0	Plymouth Argyle	Field Mill, Mansfield
15:00 GMT		Report		Attendance: 2,321; Referee: Mike Pike

13 January 2001 22	Plymouth Argyle	1–1	Darlington	Home Park, Plymouth
15:00 GMT	Taylor 39'	Report	Williams 68'	Attendance: 4,278; Referee: Dermot Gallagher

16 January 2001 23	Plymouth Argyle	1–0	Lincoln City	Home Park, Plymouth
19:45 GMT	Stonebridge 90'	Report		Attendance: 4,139; Referee: Keith Hill

20 January 2001 24	Cardiff City	4–1	Plymouth Argyle	Ninian Park, Cardiff
15:00 GMT	Earnshaw 38', 88'; Fortune-West 69'; McCulloch 90'	Report	Stonebridge 51'	Attendance: 9,157; Referee: Mark Cooper

27 January 2001 25	Plymouth Argyle	1–0	Halifax Town	Home Park, Plymouth
15:00 GMT	O'Sullivan 33'	Report		Attendance: 4,176; Referee: Anthony Bates

30 January 2001 26	Plymouth Argyle	4–0	Kidderminster Harriers	Home Park, Plymouth
19:45 GMT	Taylor 38'; Stonebridge 62', 80'; Wotton 90' (pen.)	Report		Attendance: 5,332; Referee: Richard Beeby

3 February 2001 27	Macclesfield Town	3–1	Plymouth Argyle	Moss Rose, Macclesfield
15:00 GMT	Priest 70', 90'; Whitehead 73'	Report	Stonebridge 50'	Attendance: 1,881; Referee: Roger Furnandiz

17 February 2001 28	Carlisle United	1–1	Plymouth Argyle	Brunton Park, Carlisle
15:00 GMT	Stevens 84'	Report	Friio 53'	Attendance: 3,592; Referee: Alan Kaye

20 February 2001 29	Plymouth Argyle	3–1	Shrewsbury Town	Home Park, Plymouth
19:45 GMT	Friio 56'; Stonebridge 73', 78'	Report	Rodgers 87'	Attendance: 5,007; Referee: Lee Cable

24 February 2001 30	Plymouth Argyle	0–0	Cheltenham Town	Home Park, Plymouth
15:00 GMT		Report		Attendance: 5,209; Referee: Paul Taylor

3 March 2001 31	Barnet	1–1	Plymouth Argyle	Underhill Stadium, Barnet
15:00 GMT	Currie 61'	Report	Wotton 13'	Attendance: 2,879; Referee: Chris Foy

6 March 2001 32	Blackpool	1–0	Plymouth Argyle	Bloomfield Road, Blackpool
19:45 GMT	Walker 90'	Report		Attendance: 4,570; Referee: Mark Clattenburg

10 March 2001 33	Plymouth Argyle	3–0	Chesterfield	Home Park, Plymouth
15:00 GMT	Friio 20'; Phillips 61'; McCarthy 80'	Report		Attendance: 5,399; Referee: Mark Cowburn

13 March 2001 34	Plymouth Argyle	1–1	Hull City	Home Park, Plymouth
19:45 GMT	McGregor 3'	Report	Elliott 84' (o.g.)	Attendance: 5,482; Referee: Rob Styles

17 March 2001 35	Scunthorpe United	4–1	Plymouth Argyle	Glanford Park, Scunthorpe
15:00 GMT	Calvo-García 7'; Torpey 31'; Quailey 62', 90'	Report	Stonebridge 90'	Attendance: 3,844; Referee: Howard Webb

24 March 2001 36	Plymouth Argyle	0–2	Hartlepool United	Home Park, Plymouth
12:00 GMT		Report	Miller 28'; Lormor 43'	Attendance: 4,226; Referee: Mike North

31 March 2001 37	York City	1–2	Plymouth Argyle	Bootham Crescent, York
15:00 BST	Bower 34'	Report	Evans 45', 51'	Attendance: 3,083; Referee: John Brandwood

7 April 2001 38	Plymouth Argyle	1–0	Exeter City	Home Park, Plymouth
15:00 BST	Friio 20'	Report		Attendance: 8,671; Referee: George Cain

10 April 2001 39	Leyton Orient	1–1	Plymouth Argyle	Brisbane Road, Leyton
19:45 BST	Watts 51'	Report	Meaker 27'	Attendance: 4,520; Referee: Andy Hall

14 April 2001 40	Plymouth Argyle	0–2	Brighton & Hove Albion	Home Park, Plymouth
15:00 BST		Report	Brooker 3'; Zamora 16'	Attendance: 7,490; Referee: George Stretton

16 April 2001 41	Kidderminster Harriers	3–0	Plymouth Argyle	Aggborough, Kidderminster
15:00 BST	Hadley 5'; MacKenzie 21'; Skovbjerg 43'	Report		Attendance: 3,321; Referee: Paul Armstrong

21 April 2001 42	Plymouth Argyle	3–1	Torquay United	Home Park, Plymouth
15:00 BST	Stonebridge 52', 60'; Wills 54'	Report	Kell 21' (pen.)	Attendance: 5,711; Referee: Steve Bennett

24 April 2001 43	Plymouth Argyle	3–3	Southend United	Home Park, Plymouth
19:45 BST	Friio 2'; Evans 23'; Wotton 86' (pen.)	Report	Webb 45'; Maher 77' (pen.); Newman 90'	Attendance: 3,619; Referee: Mike Dean

28 April 2001 44	Lincoln City	2–1	Plymouth Argyle	Sincil Bank, Lincoln
15:00 BST	Thorpe 24'; Dudgeon 84'	Report	Stonebridge 25'	Attendance: 4,277; Referee: Trevor Parkes

1 May 2001 45	Rochdale	2–1	Plymouth Argyle	Spotland, Rochdale
19:45 BST	Elliott 54' (o.g.); Connor 58'	Report	Evans 34'	Attendance: 4,027; Referee: Phil Joslin

5 May 2001 46	Plymouth Argyle	0–0	Rochdale	Home Park, Plymouth
15:00 BST		Report		Attendance: 5,125; Referee: Phil Dowd

=== Standings ===
Pos	Club	Pld	W	D	L	GF	GA	GD	Pts
10	Scunthorpe United	46	18	11	17	62	52	+10	65
11	Southend United	46	15	18	13	55	53	+2	63
12	Plymouth Argyle	46	15	13	18	54	61	–7	58
13	Mansfield Town	46	15	13	18	64	72	–8	58
14	Macclesfield Town	46	14	14	18	51	62	–11	56

== FA Cup ==
=== Matches ===
18 November 2000 First round	Chester City	1–1	Plymouth Argyle	Deva Stadium, Chester
15:00 GMT	Wright 78'	Report	Peake 87'	Attendance: 2,393; Referee: Phil Prosser

28 November 2000 First round	Plymouth Argyle	1–2	Chester City	Home Park, Plymouth
19:45 GMT	McGregor 73'	Report	Whitehall 42'; Ruscoe 107'	Attendance: 3,264; Referee: Phil Prosser

== League Cup ==
=== Matches ===
23 August 2000 First round	Plymouth Argyle	1–2	Bristol Rovers	Home Park, Plymouth
19:45 BST	McGregor 72'	Report	Bignot 32'; Cameron 41'	Attendance: 3,498; Referee: Trevor Parkes

5 September 2000 First round	Bristol Rovers	1–1	Plymouth Argyle	Memorial Stadium, Bristol
19:45 BST	Ellington 48'	Report	McCarthy 47'	Attendance: 5,228; Referee: John Brandwood

== League Trophy ==
=== Matches ===
5 December 2000 First round	Plymouth Argyle	3–0	Bristol City	Home Park, Plymouth
19:45 GMT	Stonebridge 26' (pen.); Gritton 65'; Taylor 74'	Report		Attendance: 1,364; Referee: Paul Rejer

9 January 2001 Second round	Bristol Rovers	3–0	Plymouth Argyle	Memorial Stadium, Bristol
19:45 GMT	Astafjevs 8', 82'; Evans 87' (pen.)	Report		Attendance: 3,781; Referee: Paul Alcock

== Players ==
=== First-team squad ===
Squad at end of season

Note: Flags indicate national team as defined under FIFA eligibility rules; some limited exceptions apply. Players may hold more than one non-FIFA nationality.

No.	Pos.	Nation	Player
1	GK	ENG	Jon Sheffield
2	DF	IRL	Wayne O'Sullivan (Note: O'Sullivan was born in Akrotiri, Cyprus, but also qualified to represent the Republic of Ireland internationally and represented the Republic of Ireland at U-21 level.)
3	DF	ENG	Jon Beswetherick
4	MF	ENG	Chris Leadbitter
5	DF	ENG	Mick Heathcote (captain)
6	DF	ENG	Craig Taylor
7	MF	ENG	Martin Barlow
8	MF	ENG	Sean Evers
9	FW	WAL	Sean McCarthy
10	FW	ENG	Paul McGregor
11	FW	IRL	Mickey Evans (Note: Evans was born in Plymouth, England, but also qualified to represent the Republic of Ireland internationally and made his international debut for the Republic of Ireland in October 1997.)
12	FW	ENG	Lee Phillips
13	GK	ENG	John Hodges
14	FW	ENG	Ian Stonebridge
15	DF	ENG	Paul Wotton
16	GK	FRA	Romain Larrieu

No.	Pos.	Nation	Player
17	FW	SCO	Martin Gritton
18	MF	ENG	Steve Adams
19	MF	ENG	Kevin Wills
20	MF	WAL	Michael Meaker (Note: Meaker was born in Ealing, England, but also qualified to represent Wales internationally and represented Wales at U-21 level.)
21	FW	ENG	Steve Guinan
22	MF	ENG	Steve McCall
23	MF	ENG	Martin Phillips
24	MF	ENG	Danny Bance
25	DF	IRL	David Worrell
26	MF	FRA	David Friio
27	DF	NIR	Brian McGlinchey
28	MF	FRA	Jean-Philippe Javary
29	GK	ENG	Luke McCormick
30	MF	ENG	Stuart Elliott
31	DF	ENG	Paul Connolly
32	FW	ENG	Ryan Trudgian

=== Left club during season ===
Note: Flags indicate national team as defined under FIFA eligibility rules; some limited exceptions apply. Players may hold more than one non-FIFA nationality.

No.	Pos.	Nation	Player
8	MF	ENG	Terry Fleming (to Cambridge United)
11	MF	ENG	Jason Peake (to Nuneaton Borough)
16	DF	ENG	Adam Barrett (to Mansfield Town)
20	MF	ENG	Jamie Morrison-Hill (released)
20	DF	SCO	Lee Wilkie (on loan from Dundee)

No.	Pos.	Nation	Player
22	MF	ENG	Robert Betts (on loan from Coventry City)
24	MF	ENG	Kevin Nancekivell (on loan to Tiverton Town)
25	DF	WAL	Paul Mardon (Note: Mardon was born in Bristol, England, but also qualified to represent Wales internationally and made his international debut for Wales in October 1995.) (on loan from West Bromwich Albion)
28	DF	FRA	Sacha Opinel (released)

== Squad statistics ==
=== Appearances and goals ===
Pos.	Name	League		FA Cup		League Cup		League Trophy		Total	
Pos.	Name	Apps	Goals	Apps	Goals	Apps	Goals	Apps	Goals	Apps	Goals
GK	(England) John Hodges	2	0	2	0	0	0	0	0	4	0
GK	(France) Romain Larrieu	15	0	0	0	0	0	2	0	17	0
GK	(England) Luke McCormick	1	0	0	0	0	0	0	0	1	0
GK	(England) Jon Sheffield	29	0	0	2	0	0	0	0	31	0
DF	(England) Danny Bance	1	0	0	0	0	0	0	0	1	0
DF	(England) Adam Barrett	9	0	0	0	2	0	0	0	11	0
DF	(England) Jon Beswetherick	45	0	2	0	2	0	1	0	50	0
DF	(England) Paul Connolly	1	0	0	0	0	0	0	0	1	0
DF	(England) Michael Heathcote	5	0	0	0	0	0	1	0	6	0
DF	(Wales) Paul Mardon	3	1	0	0	0	0	0	0	3	1
DF	(Northern Ireland) Brian McGlinchey	20	0	0	0	0	0	2	0	22	0
DF	(France) Sacha Opinel	0	0	0	0	0	0	1	0	1	0
DF	(Republic of Ireland) Wayne O'Sullivan	40	1	0	0	2	0	0	0	42	1
DF	(England) Craig Taylor	39	3	2	0	2	0	1	1	44	4
DF	(Scotland) Lee Wilkie	2	0	0	0	0	0	0	0	2	0
DF	(Republic of Ireland) David Worrell	14	0	0	0	0	0	2	0	16	0
DF	(England) Paul Wotton	42	4	2	0	1	0	1	0	46	4
MF	(England) Steve Adams	17	0	1	0	0	0	1	0	19	0
MF	(England) Martin Barlow	20	0	2	0	2	0	0	0	24	0
MF	(England) Robert Betts	4	0	0	0	0	0	0	0	4	0
MF	(England) Stuart Elliott	12	0	0	0	0	0	0	0	12	0
MF	(England) Sean Evers	7	0	0	0	0	0	0	0	7	0
MF	(England) Terry Fleming	17	0	2	0	2	0	2	0	23	0
MF	(France) David Friio	26	5	0	0	0	0	1	0	27	5
MF	(France) Jean-Philippe Javary	4	0	0	0	0	0	0	0	4	0
MF	(England) Chris Leadbitter	9	0	2	0	0	0	1	0	12	0
MF	(Wales) Michael Meaker	11	1	0	0	0	0	0	0	11	1
MF	(England) Kevin Nancekivell	6	1	0	0	1	0	0	0	7	1
MF	(England) Jason Peake	10	2	2	1	1	0	0	0	13	3
MF	(England) Martin Phillips	42	1	2	0	2	0	2	0	48	1
MF	(England) Kevin Wills	10	1	2	0	0	0	2	0	14	1
FW	(Republic of Ireland) Mickey Evans	10	4	0	0	0	0	0	0	10	4
FW	(Scotland) Martin Gritton	10	1	1	0	2	0	2	1	15	2
FW	(England) Steve Guinan	22	1	2	0	2	0	1	0	27	1
FW	(Wales) Sean McCarthy	37	10	0	0	2	1	0	0	39	11
FW	(England) Paul McGregor	33	6	2	1	1	1	1	0	37	8
FW	(England) Lee Phillips	6	0	0	0	1	0	1	0	8	0
FW	(England) Ian Stonebridge	31	11	2	0	0	0	2	1	35	12
FW	(England) Ryan Trudgian	1	0	0	0	0	0	0	0	1	0
