= Plymouth Argyle F.C. Player of the Year =

English football award voted by its supporters

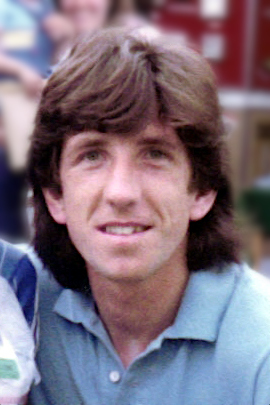
Paul Mariner, winner of the Player of the Year award in 1975 and 1976.

Plymouth Argyle Football Club is an English association football club based in Plymouth, Devon. Founded in 1886 as Argyle Football Club, they became a professional club in January 1903, and were elected to the Southern League ahead of the 1903–04 season. The club won the Southern League championship in 1913 and finished as runners-up on two occasions, before being elected to the Football League in 1920, where they compete to this day, as a founder member of the Third Division. Argyle won their first Football League championship, and promotion to the Second Division for the first time, ten years later in 1930. As of 2010, the club has won five championships in the Football League, gained promotion on eight occasions, and been relegated eight times. Four of those league championships were won in the third tier, which is a divisional record. Argyle have made one appearance at Wembley Stadium, in which they won the 1996 Third Division play-off final. The club has also achieved moderate success in domestic cup competitions; they reached the semi-finals of the FA Cup in 1984, and the quarter-finals in 2007. Argyle have also reached the semi-finals of the League Cup twice, in 1965 and 1974.

The Plymouth Argyle Player of the Year award is voted for annually by the club's supporters. It recognises the best overall performance by an individual player through the course of the season. Each year, the winner is presented with the trophy on the pitch at Home Park before the club's last home game of the season. This is the more prestigious of the two awards made by Plymouth Argyle itself, with the other being the Young Player of the Year accolade. Since its inception in 1966, thirty-nine different players have won the award. Six of these players have lifted the award for a second time, the most recent being Welsh international Carl Fletcher. As of the 2010–11 season, only striker Tommy Tynan has received the award for a third time. Three players have lifted the trophy in consecutive seasons; the first was Paul Mariner in 1976. Steve McCall matched that feat in the 1994, and Carl Fletcher became the third in 2011. Seven winners of the award have represented their country at international level. Six winners have gone on to become the club's manager. The 2012–13 winner was Onismor Bhasera, who made 46 appearances in all competitions during the campaign. Top goalscorer Reuben Reid won the award the following season, becoming the first forward to win the award since Mickey Evans.

== Table key ==
^{¤}	Denotes divisional change due to promotion or relegation
*	Elected to the Plymouth Argyle Hall of Fame
^{†}	Denotes player who has won full international caps

Player (X)	Denotes the number of times a player has won the award
Div 2	Second Division (1892–1992), First Division (1992–2004), Championship (2004–)
Div 3	Third Division (1958–1992), Second Division (1992–2004), League One (2004–)
Div 4	Fourth Division (1958–1992), Third Division (1992–2004), League Two (2004–)

== Winners ==
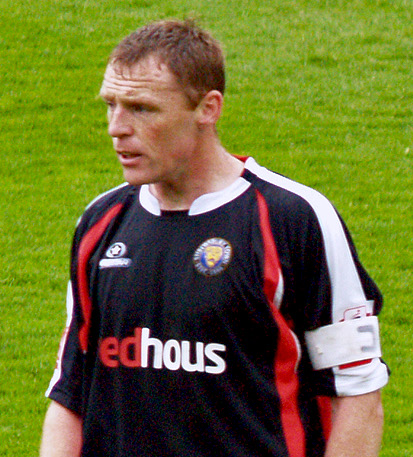
Graham Coughlan was the club's top league scorer in 2001–02.

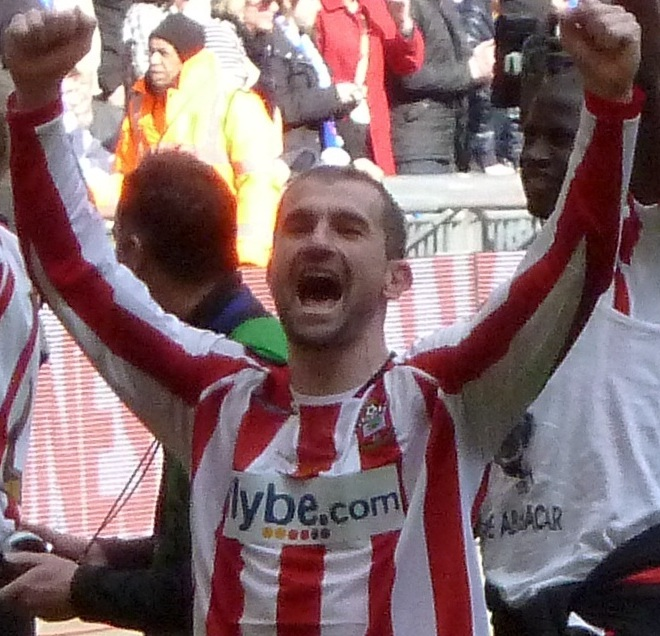
Paul Wotton captained the club to league titles in 2002 and 2004.

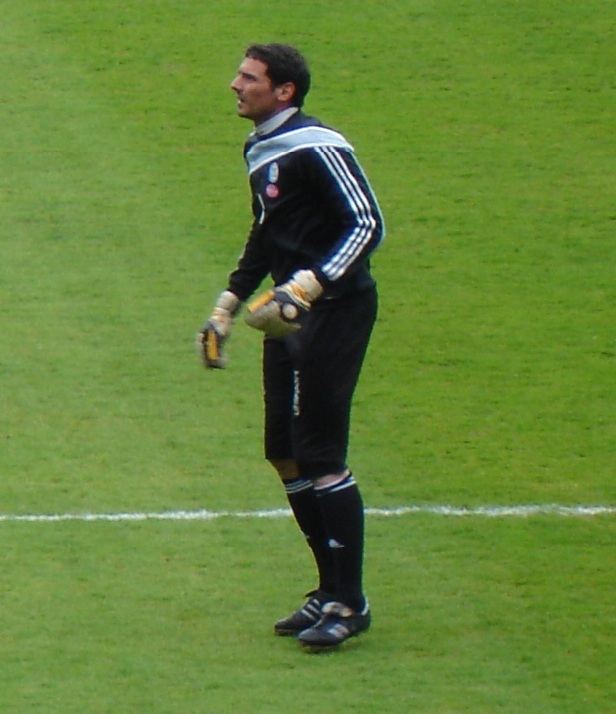
Romain Larrieu won the award in his ninth season with the club.

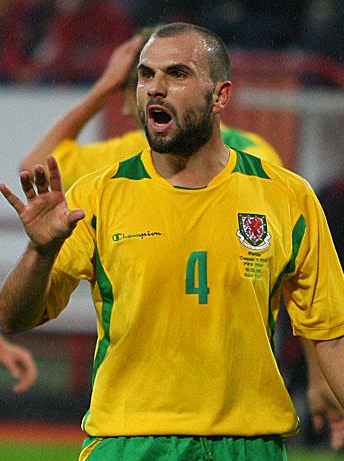
Carl Fletcher was the first Welsh player to win the award in 2010.

As of end of 2021–22 season.

Plymouth Argyle F.C. Player of the Year winners
Season	Level^{[A]}	Player^{[B]}	Position^{[C]}	Nationality	Apps^{[D]}	Goals^{[D]}	Caps^{[E]}	Notes
1965–66	Div 2	Johnny Newman	Defender	England	328	11	0	^{[F]}
1966–67	Div 2	Norman Piper	Midfielder	England	233	37	0	^{[G]}
1967–68	Div 2	Pat Dunne	Goalkeeper	Republic of Ireland	164	0	5^{†}	—
1968–69	Div 3^{¤}	David Burnside	Midfielder	England	113	17	0	^{[H]}
1969–70	Div 3	Derek Rickard	Forward	England	121	42	0	—
1970–71	Div 3	Jim Furnell*	Goalkeeper	England	207	0	0	—
1971–72	Div 3	David Provan	Defender	Scotland	139	10	5^{†}	—
1972–73	Div 3	Neil Hague	Defender	England	113	17	0	—
1973–74	Div 3	Ernie Machin*	Midfielder	England	70	7	0	—
1974–75	Div 3	Paul Mariner*	Forward	England	155	61	35^{†}	—
1975–76	Div 2^{¤}	Paul Mariner* (2)	Forward	England	155	61	35^{†}	^{[I]}^{[J]}
1976–77	Div 2	Neil Ramsbottom	Goalkeeper	England	41	0	0	—
1977–78	Div 3^{¤}	George Foster	Defender	England	248	6	0	—
1978–79	Div 3	Fred Binney	Forward	England	81	42	0	—
1979–80	Div 3	George Foster (2)	Defender	England	248	6	0	^{[J]}
1980–81	Div 3	David Kemp	Forward	England	95	45	0	—
1981–82	Div 3	John Sims	Forward	England	185	49	0	—
1982–83	Div 3	Gordon Nisbet*	Defender	England	334	17	0	—
1983–84	Div 3	Gordon Staniforth	Forward	England	114	25	0	—
1984–85	Div 3	Tommy Tynan*	Forward	England	310	145	0	—
1985–86	Div 3	Kevin Hodges*	Midfielder	England	620	87	0	^{[K]}
1986–87	Div 2^{¤}	Tommy Tynan* (2)	Forward	England	310	145	0	—
1987–88	Div 2	Steve Cherry	Goalkeeper	England	102	0	0	—
1988–89	Div 2	Tommy Tynan* (3)	Forward	England	310	145	0	^{[L]}
1989–90	Div 2	Nicky Marker	Defender	England	237	18	0	—
1990–91	Div 2	Kenny Brown	Defender	England	144	4	0	—
1991–92	Div 2	Dwight Marshall	Forward	Jamaica	155	48	0	—
1992–93	Div 3^{¤}	Steve McCall	Midfielder	England	160	6	0	^{[J]}
1993–94	Div 3	Steve McCall (2)	Midfielder	England	160	6	0	—
1994–95	Div 3	Marc Edworthy	Defender	England	87	1	0	—
1995–96	Div 4^{¤}	Michael Heathcote	Defender	England	235	17	0	—
1996–97	Div 3^{¤}	Chris Billy	Midfielder	England	137	9	0	—
1997–98	Div 3	Martin Barlow	Midfielder	England	377	26	0	^{[M]}
1997–98	Div 3	Carlo Corazzin	Forward	Canada	85	24	59^{†}	^{[M]}
1998–99	Div 4^{¤}	Michael Heathcote (2)	Defender	England	235	17	0	^{[J]}
1999–00	Div 4	Paul McGregor	Forward	England	90	24	0	—
2000–01	Div 4	Wayne O'Sullivan	Midfielder	Republic of Ireland	97	3	0	—
2001–02	Div 4	Graham Coughlan*	Defender	Republic of Ireland	193	26	0	^{[N]}
2002–03	Div 3^{¤}	Paul Wotton*	Defender	England	476	66	0	^{[O]}
2003–04	Div 3	Mickey Evans*	Forward	Republic of Ireland	432	81	1^{†}	^{[P]}
2004–05	Div 2^{¤}	Paul Wotton* (2)	Midfielder	England	476	66	0	^{[J]}
2005–06	Div 2	David Norris	Midfielder	England	243	28	0	—
2006–07	Div 2	Lilian Nalis	Midfielder	France	111	6	0	—
2007–08	Div 2	Krisztián Timár	Defender	Hungary	91	5	4^{†}	—
2008–09	Div 2	Romain Larrieu	Goalkeeper	France	318	0	0	—
2009–10	Div 2	Carl Fletcher	Midfielder	Wales	107	9	36^{†}	—
2010–11	Div 3^{¤}	Carl Fletcher (2)	Midfielder	Wales	107	9	36^{†}	^{[J]}
2011–12	Div 4^{¤}	Maxime Blanchard	Defender	France	115	4	—	—
2012–13	Div 4	Onismor Bhasera	Defender	Zimbabwe	114	4	19^{†}	—
2013–14	Div 4	Reuben Reid	Forward	England	89	24	—	—
2014–15	Div 4	Luke McCormick	Goalkeeper	England	227	0	—	—
2015–16	Div 4	Graham Carey	Midfielder	Republic of Ireland	39	11	—	—
2017–18	Div 3^{¤}	Graham Carey (2)	Midfielder	Republic of Ireland	47	15	—	^{[J]}
2018–19	Div 3	Rúben Lameiras	Midfielder	Portugal	82	18	—	—
2019–20	Div 4^{¤}	Antoni Sarcevic	Midfielder	England	132	20	—	—
2020–21	Div 3^{¤}	Joe Edwards	Defender	England	137	16	—	—
2021–22	Div 3	Michael Cooper	Goalkeeper	England	111	0	—	—

=== By player ===
Plymouth Argyle F.C. Player of the Year winners by player
Player	Total	Years
(England) Tommy Tynan	3	1985, 1987, 1989
(England) Paul Mariner	2	1975, 1976
(England) George Foster	2	1978, 1980
(England) Steve McCall	2	1993, 1994
(England) Michael Heathcote	2	1996, 1999
(England) Paul Wotton	2	2003, 2005
(Wales) Carl Fletcher	2	2010, 2011
(Republic of Ireland) Graham Carey	2	2016, 2018

=== By country ===
Plymouth Argyle F.C. Player of the Year winners by nationality
Country	Players	Total
England	32	39
Republic of Ireland	4	5
France	3	3
Wales	1	2
Canada	1	1
Hungary	1	1
Jamaica	1	1
Portugal	1	1
Scotland	1	1
Zimbabwe	1	1

== Footnotes ==
A.: The official level of competition in the structure of the English football league system.
B.: Winning players are sourced to Danes (2009), up to and including the 2008–09 season, and to the official Plymouth Argyle website as appropriate thereafter. Players that have been inducted into the club's Hall of Fame, created in 2004 to mark their 100th season as a professional club, are sourced to Cowdery & Curno (2009), up to and including the 2008–09 season, and to the official Plymouth Argyle website as appropriate thereafter.
C.: For a detailed description of playing positions, see Association football positions.
D. ^{a} ^{b} : Appearances made and goals scored are sourced to Danes (2009), up to and including the 2008–09 season, and Soccerbase as appropriate thereafter. All appearances made and goals scored during their career with the club are included.
E.: Caps earned at international level are sourced to Danes (2009), up to and including the 2008–09 season, and the relevant player reference thereafter.

F.: The first winner of the award in 1966.
G.: Piper won four caps for the England U23 team, and two caps for England B.
H.: Burnside earned one cap for England at U23 level.
I.: Mariner was the first player to win the award twice, and in consecutive seasons.
J. ^{a} ^{b} ^{c} ^{d} ^{e} ^{f} ^{g} : Won the award on two occasions.
K.: Holds club record for appearances made; eighth overall for goals scored.
L.: The first player to lift the trophy on three occasions.
M. ^{a} ^{b} : Shared award.
N.: Included in the Team of the Century while still a member of the squad.
O.: 2009 Hall of Fame inductee.
P.: 2010 Hall of Fame inductee.
