= Paul McGregor =

Paul McGregor may refer to:

- Paul McGregor (rugby league) (born 1967), Australian rugby league footballer
- Paul McGregor (footballer) (born 1974), English footballer
