= Ulterior (band) =

English post-punk band

- Origin: England
- Genres: Post-punk
- Years active: 2006-present
- Label: Disc Error Recordings
- Members: Simmons (Paul Simmons); Honey (Paul McGregor); Mickey (Michael Ellis); MCG (Benn McGregor)
- Past members: Karl Januskevicius
- Website: www.ulteriorlondon.com

Ulterior are an English post-punk band formed in 2006 and are based in London, signed to independent record label Disc Error Recordings. They consist of band members Simmons, Honey, Mickey and MCG.

== History ==
Former professional footballer Paul McGregor (Honey), his brother Benn (MCG), and guitarist Paul Simmons (Simmons) began as a three-piece band in late 2006. Shortly after, in 2007, Karl Januskevicius, (Motorcycle Boy), joined Ulterior full time on synthesizer.

After some performances in London and their debut single "Weapons", Ulterior were asked to support The Horrors at the Shockwaves NME Awards 2008 at The London Astoria.

In 2008 the band was mentioned by The Quietus as "consistently playing some of the most intense gigs in the past couple of years".

2008 saw Januskevicius move onto bass guitar. In February 2009 Januskevicius quit the band citing health and personal problems on the eve of their European tour with The Sisters Of Mercy. Januskevicius was replaced by Michael Ellis (Mickey). The tour with The Sisters Of Mercy in February / March 2009 was followed by a UK tour with White Rose Movement in May.

Ulterior then released their third single, a 10" double AA side vinyl entitled "Sister Speed / Aporia" supported by a promotional video that features live footage from the show with The Sisters Of Mercy at Razzmattaz, Barcelona. A German limited edition of the vinyl single features an enhanced bonus CD with multiple remixes and the video.

Ulterior have featured in printed press such as NME, The Stool Pigeon, Vice Magazine and Artrocker.

Ulterior recorded all Disc Error Recordings releases and debut studio album 'Wild In Wildlife' at Studio 150 in Amsterdam with Zlaya Hadzic, a Bosnian born music producer. Zlaya previously recorded and mixed Sonic Youth and Tortoise. The album cover features work by Guy Denning, who let the band use his piece ‘Where's Your Famous Golden Touch?’ The 2011 release was preceded by single "Sex War Sex Cars Sex" which features a remix by The March Violets where Ulterior's trademark drum machines are replaced by acoustic drums.

For second album 'The Bleach Room' (2013) Ulterior worked with producer Robert Harder at Harder Sounds Studio in Acton, London. Robert's previous studio credits include production for Whitey, Sohodolls, The Slits, Neneh Cherry and work with Kylie Minogue, Babyshambles, David Byrne & Brian Eno, No Bra and The Sunshine Underground.

Ulterior's third album 'Aversion' was a digital only release for Christmas 2013, featuring 5 covers (songs by Rowland S Howard, Bruce Springsteen, Lou Reed, Manic Street Preachers & Madonna) plus 8 remixed versions of songs from The Bleach Room. 'Aversion' was later released on compact disc in Japan.

== Publishing ==
On 28 October 2009 Ulteriors debut single "Weapons" was featured on the PlayStation 3 game MotorStorm: Pacific Rift alongside David Bowie, Nine Inch Nails, Primal Scream, Nirvana, Megadeth, Slipknot, and Queens Of The Stone Age. "Weapons" was also used online for a McLaren Mercedes podcast in 2007.

== Live ==
Ulterior have supported The Sisters Of Mercy, UK Decay, The Horrors, Echo & The Bunnymen, These New Puritans, A.R.E. Weapons, Black Strobe, White Rose Movement, Tuxedo Moon, The March Violets, O Children and Sonic Boom. In addition to headline tours in UK and Europe and major festival appearances (Wave Gotik Treffen, Leipzig 2011 main stage with Fields Of The Nephlim & Killing Joke, Summer Darkness, Utrecht 2011 with Killing Joke & Nitzer Ebb, Shadowplay, Kortrijk 2011 with Clan Of Xymox, Peter Hook & The Light, Grauzone, Amsterdam 2013), Ulterior's headline touring includes Japan (April 2014, with Plasticzooms) and South Africa.

== Music videos ==
- Weapons, directed by The Turrell Brothers
- 15, directed by Aram Garriga and The Visual Suspects
- Sister Speed, directed by Aram Garriga and The Visual Suspects
- Sex War Sex Cars Sex, directed by John & Tom Turrell
- Big City Black Rain, directed by The Turrell Brothers
- The Locus Of Control, directed by Ben Robinson

== Discography ==
=== Albums ===
- Wild In Wildlife (Speed Records - 2011) (Compact Disc and Download)
- The Bleach Room (Speed Records - 7 January 2013) (Vinyl, Compact Disc and Download)
- The Bleach Room (51 Records - 7 January 2013) (Japan only, Compact Disc includes exclusive bonus track 'Miss America')
- Aversion (51 Records - 16 April 2014) (5 covers & 8 remixes, originally a Christmas 2013 Download, later a Japan only Compact Disc)

Compilations

- Kempers Heads (Killer Pimp - 31 March 2009) (Enhanced Compact Disc and Download; USA only)
- Kempers Heads (Knew Noise Recordings - 10 June 2009) (Same as 'Kempers Heads USA' Compact Disc without the multimedia; Japan only)

Others

- Live URA (URA Gallery Bootleg - 9 January 2008) CD-R in black paper sleeve with 4 live tracks as one MP3 file, limited to 300 copies; available through Rough Trade UK

=== EPs and singles ===
- "Weapons" (Disc Error Recordings - 17 December 2007) (12" Vinyl & Download)
- 15 EP (Disc Error Recordings - July 2008) (12" Vinyl in three colour-ways and Download)
- "Sister Speed" / "Aporia" (Disc Error Recordings - June 2009) (10" AA Vinyl and Download)
- "Sex War Sex Cars Sex" (Speed Records - 1 November 2010) (7" vinyl in three sleeve variants 'Sex', 'War' & 'Cars' and Download)
