= 2004–05 Norwich City F.C. season =

Norwich City
2004–05 season
- Chairman: Roger Munby
- Manager: Nigel Worthington
- Stadium: Carrow Road
- FA Premier League: 19th (relegated to the Championship)
- FA Cup: Third round proper
- League Cup: Third round
- Top goalscorer: League: Dean Ashton; Damien Francis; Leon McKenzie (7); All: Dean Ashton; Damien Francis; Darren Huckerby; Leon McKenzie (7)
- Highest home attendance: 25,522 (vs. Manchester United, 9 April 2005)
- Lowest home attendance: 23,549 (vs. Bolton Wanderers, 11 December 2004)
- Average home league attendance: 24,350
Home colours	Away colours

The 2004–05 season was the 103rd season in the history of Norwich City. It was the club's first season in the Premier League for nine years, following promotion from the First Division in 2003–04. However, they were immediately relegated back to the second tier, notably without having won a competitive match away from home during the whole season. Despite being in pole position to stay up going into the final match of the season against Fulham, a 6–0 defeat at Craven Cottage sealed their fate. This article shows statistics and lists all matches played by the club during the season.

== Statistics ==
=== Appearances, goals and cards ===
(Substitute appearances in brackets)

No.	Pos.	Name	League		FA Cup		League Cup		Total		Discipline	
No.	Pos.	Name	Apps	Goals	Apps	Goals	Apps	Goals	Apps	Goals	Yellow card	Red card
1	GK	(England) Robert Green	38	0	1	0	2	0	41	0	0	0
3	DF	(England) Adam Drury	31 (2)	1	0	0	2	0	33 (2)	1	2	0
4	MF	(England) Graham Stuart	7 (1)	0	0	0	0	0	7 (1)	0	1	0
5	DF	(England) Craig Fleming	38	1	1	0	2	0	41	1	2	0
6	FW	(England) Darren Huckerby	36 (1)	6	1	0	2	1	39 (1)	7	1	0
7	MF	(Northern Ireland) Philip Mulryne	8 (2)	0	0 (1)	0	0	0	8 (3)	0	?	0
8	MF	(Scotland) Gary Holt	21 (6)	0	0	0	2	0	23 (6)	0	?	0
9	MF	(Sweden) Mattias Jonson	19 (9)	0	1	0	1	0	21 (9)	0	2	1
10	FW	(England) David Bentley	22 (4)	2	1	0	0 (1)	0	23 (5)	2	?	0
11	DF	(Canada) Jim Brennan	6 (4)	0	1	0	0	0	7 (4)	0	0	0
12	GK	(Wales) Darren Ward	0 (1)	0	0	0	0	0	0 (1)	0	0	0
14	FW	(England) Leon McKenzie	24 (13)	7	0	0	0	0	24 (13)	7	4	0
15	MF	(Morocco) Youssef Safri	13 (5)	1	0	0	1 (1)	1	14 (6)	2	4	0
16	DF	(England) Simon Charlton	22 (2)	1	1	0	1	0	24 (2)	1	1	0
17	DF	(England) Marc Edworthy	27 (1)	0	1	0	1 (1)	0	29 (2)	0	?	1
18	FW	(Northern Ireland) Paul McVeigh	3 (14)	1	0	0	1	0	4 (14)	1	0	0
19	FW	(Sweden) Mathias Svensson	10 (12)	4	0	0	1 (1)	0	11 (13)	4	?	0
20	MF	(Jamaica) Damien Francis	32	7	1	0	2	0	35	7	3	0
21	GK	(Scotland) Paul Gallacher	0	0	0	0	0	0	0	0	0	0
22	FW	(England) Ian Henderson	0 (3)	0	0	0	0 (1)	0	0 (4)	0	0	0
23	FW	(England) Ryan Jarvis	1 (3)	1	0 (1)	0	0	0	1 (4)	1	0	0
24	DF	(England) Jason Shackell	11	0	0	0	1	0	12	0	1	0
26	DF	(Denmark) Thomas Helveg	16 (4)	0	1	0	1 (1)	0	18 (5)	0	?	0
27	DF	(Republic of Ireland) Gary Doherty	17 (3)	2	1	0	2	0	20 (3)	2	0	0
28	FW	(England) Danny Crow	0 (3)	0	0	0	0	0	0 (3)	0	0	0
30	GK	(England) Joe Lewis	0	0	0	0	0	0	0	0	0	0
36	FW	(England) Dean Ashton	16	7	0	0	0	0	16	7	0	0

== Matches ==
Win Draw Loss

=== League ===
Round	1	2	3	4	5	6	7	8	9	10	11	12	13	14	15	16	17	18	19
Result	1–1	2–1	1–1	1–4	0–0	0–0	0–3	2–2	0–0	2–3	1–1	1–1	0–4	2–1	1–1	0–1	3–2	0–4	0–2
Position	11	17	16	17	17	18	19	19	17	18	19	19	20	18	19	19	15	17	17

Round	20	21	22	23	24	25	26	27	28	29	30	31	32	33	34	35	36	37	38
Result	0–2	1–1	1–2	0–3	4–4	0–1	3–2	0–3	2–3	1–3	0–1	1–4	2–0	3–3	2–1	1–0	3–4	1–0	0–6
Position	18	17	18	18	19	19	18	18	19	19	20	20	20	20	20	18	20	17	19

==== August ====
14 August 2004	Norwich City	1–1	Crystal Palace	Norwich, Norfolk
15:00 BST	Huckerby 16'	Report	Johnson 73'	Stadium: Carrow Road; Attendance: 23,717; Referee: Peter Walton

21 August 2004	Manchester United	2–1	Norwich City	Old Trafford, Greater Manchester
17:15 BST	Bellion 32'; Smith 50'	Report	McVeigh 75'	Stadium: Old Trafford; Attendance: 67,812; Referee: Neale Barry

25 August 2004	Newcastle United	2–2	Norwich City	Newcastle upon Tyne, Tyne and Wear
20:00 BST	Bellamy 40'; Hughes 50'	Report	Bentley 52'; Doherty 74'	Stadium: St James' Park; Attendance: 51,574; Referee: Mark Halsey

28 August 2004	Norwich City	1–4	Arsenal	Norwich, Norfolk
17:15 BST	Huckerby 50' (pen.)	Report	Reyes 22'; Henry 36'; Pires 40'; Bergkamp 90'	Stadium: Carrow Road; Attendance: 23,944; Referee: Graham Poll

==== September ====
12 September 2004	Tottenham Hotspur	0–0	Norwich City	Tottenham, London
16:05 BST		Report		Stadium: White Hart Lane; Attendance: 36,095; Referee: Howard Webb

18 September 2004	Norwich City	0–0	Aston Villa	Norwich, Norfolk
15:00 BST		Report		Stadium: Carrow Road; Attendance: 23,805; Referee: Barry Knight

25 September 2004	Liverpool	3–0	Norwich City	Liverpool, Merseyside
15:00 BST	Baroš 23'; Luis García 26'; Cissé 64'	Report		Stadium: Anfield; Attendance: 43,152; Referee: Alan Wiley

==== October ====
2 October 2004	Norwich City	2–2	Portsmouth	Norwich, Norfolk
15:00 BST	Huckerby 63'; Charlton 67'	Report	Yakubu 37'; Berger 65'	Stadium: Carrow Road; Attendance: 23,853; Referee: Matt Messias

16 October 2004	West Bromwich Albion	0–0	Norwich City	West Bromwich, West Midlands
15:00 BST		Report		Stadium: The Hawthorns; Attendance: 26,257; Referee: Phil Crossley

23 October 2004	Norwich City	2–3	Everton	Norwich, Norfolk
12:45 BST	McKenzie 48'; Francis 57'	Report	Kilbane 10'; Bent 40'; Ferguson 73'	Stadium: Carrow Road; Attendance: 23,871; Referee: Mark Clattenburg

==== November ====
1 November 2004	Manchester City	1–1	Norwich City	Bradford, Greater Manchester
20:00 GMT	Flood 11'	Report	Francis 46'	Stadium: City of Manchester Stadium; Attendance: 42,803; Referee: Steve Bennett

6 November 2004	Norwich City	1–1	Blackburn Rovers	Norwich, Norfolk
15:00 GMT	Svensson 56'	Report	Bothroyd (red card) 44'; Dickov 86'	Stadium: Carrow Road; Attendance: 23,834; Referee: Steve Dunn

13 November 2004	Charlton Athletic	4–0	Norwich City	Charlton, London
15:00 GMT	Johansson 15', 21'; Konchesky 75'; Euell 88'	Report		Stadium: The Valley; Attendance: 27,057; Referee: Andre Marriner

20 November 2004	Norwich City	2–1	Southampton	Norwich, Norfolk
15:00 GMT	Francis 28', 52'	Report	Beattie 24'	Stadium: Carrow Road; Attendance: 23,706; Referee: Mike Riley

27 November 2004	Birmingham City	1–1	Norwich City	Birmingham, West Midlands
15:00 GMT	Morrison 9'	Report	Huckerby 64'	Stadium: St Andrew's; Attendance: 29,120; Referee: Graham Poll

==== December ====
4 December 2004	Norwich City	0–1	Fulham	Norwich, Norfolk
15:00 GMT		Report	Cole 7'	Stadium: Carrow Road; Attendance: 23,755; Referee: Alan Wiley

11 December 2004	Norwich City	3–2	Bolton Wanderers	Norwich, Norfolk
15:00 GMT	Svensson 20', 84'; Huckerby 69' (pen.)	Report	Okocha 19' (pen.); Hierro 23'	Stadium: Carrow Road; Attendance: 23,549; Referee: Barry Knight

18 December 2004	Chelsea	4–0	Norwich City	Fulham, London
15:00 GMT	Duff 10'; Lampard 34'; Robben 44'; Drogba 83'	Report		Stadium: Stamford Bridge; Attendance: 42,071; Referee: Mike Dean

26 December 2004	Norwich City	0–2	Tottenham Hotspur	Norwich, Norfolk
15:00 GMT		Report	Keane 73'; Brown 77'	Stadium: Carrow Road; Attendance: 24,508; Referee: Mike Riley

28 December 2004	Middlesbrough	2–0	Norwich City	Middlesbrough, North Yorkshire
15:00 GMT	Job 52', 54'	Report		Stadium: Riverside Stadium; Attendance: 34,836; Referee: Howard Webb

==== January ====
1 January 2005	Portsmouth	1–1	Norwich City	Portsmouth, Hampshire
15:00 GMT	Yakubu 61' (pen.)	Report	Edworthy (red card) 5'; Francis 9'	Stadium: Fratton Park; Attendance: 20,015; Referee: Phil Dowd

3 January 2005	Norwich City	1–2	Liverpool	Norwich, Norfolk
12:45 GMT	Jarvis 88'	Report	Luis García 58'; Riise 64'	Stadium: Carrow Road; Attendance: 24,503; Referee: Howard Webb

15 January 2005	Aston Villa	3–0	Norwich City	Birmingham, West Midlands
15:00 GMT	Ridgewell 9'; Hendrie 27'; Solano 76'	Report		Stadium: Villa Park; Attendance: 38,172; Referee: Mike Riley

22 January 2005	Norwich City	4–4	Middlesbrough	Norwich, Norfolk
15:00 GMT	Francis 18'; Ashton 80'; McKenzie 90'; Drury 90'	Report	Hasselbaink 34', 78'; Queudrue 49', 55'	Stadium: Carrow Road; Attendance: 24,574; Referee: Matt Messias

==== February ====
2 February 2005	Everton	1–0	Norwich City	Liverpool, Merseyside
19:45 GMT	Ferguson 78'	Report		Stadium: Goodison Park; Attendance: 37,485; Referee: Alan Wiley

5 February 2005	Norwich City	3–2	West Bromwich Albion	Norwich, Norfolk
15:00 GMT	Fleming 45'; Doherty 62'; Francis 85'	Report	Earnshaw 41'; Richardson 49'	Stadium: Carrow Road; Attendance: 24,292; Referee: Chris Foy

12 February 2005	Blackburn Rovers	3–0	Norwich City	Blackburn, Lancashire
15:00 GMT	Pedersen 17'; Dickov 39', 62'	Report		Stadium: Ewood Park; Attendance: 20,923; Referee: Steve Dunn

28 February 2005	Norwich City	2–3	Manchester City	Norwich, Norfolk
20:00 GMT	Ashton 12'; McKenzie 16'; Jonson (yellow card) 55' (yellow-red card) 66'	Report	Sibierski 25'; Fowler 37', 90'	Stadium: Carrow Road; Attendance: 24,302; Referee: Rob Styles

==== March ====
5 March 2005	Norwich City	1–3	Chelsea	Norwich, Norfolk
17:15 GMT	McKenzie 64'	Report	Cole 22'; Kežman 71'; Carvalho 79'	Stadium: Carrow Road; Attendance: 24,506; Referee: Mark Halsey

19 March 2005	Bolton Wanderers	1–0	Norwich City	Bolton, Greater Manchester
17:15 GMT	Giannakopoulos 42'	Report		Stadium: Reebok Stadium; Attendance: 25,081; Referee: Peter Walton

==== April ====
2 April 2005	Arsenal	4–1	Norwich City	Highbury, London
15:00 BST	Henry 19', 22', 66'; Ljungberg 50'	Report	Huckerby 30'	Stadium: Arsenal Stadium; Attendance: 38,066; Referee: Alan Wiley

9 April 2005	Norwich City	2–0	Manchester United	Norwich, Norfolk
17:15 BST	Ashton 55'; McKenzie 66'	Report		Stadium: Carrow Road; Attendance: 25,522; Referee: Howard Webb

16 April 2005	Crystal Palace	3–3	Norwich City	South Norwood, London
15:00 BST	Kolkka 5'; Hughes 73'; Johnson 83' (pen.)	Report	Ashton 22', 46'; McKenzie 53'	Stadium: Selhurst Park; Attendance: 25,754; Referee: Rob Styles

20 April 2005	Norwich City	2–1	Newcastle United	Norwich, Norfolk
19:45 BST	Safri 68'; Ashton 90'	Report	Kluivert 90'	Stadium: Carrow Road; Attendance: 25,503; Referee: Andre Marriner

23 April 2005	Norwich City	1–0	Charlton Athletic	Norwich, Norfolk
15:00 BST	Svensson 88'	Report		Stadium: Carrow Road; Attendance: 25,459; Referee: Martin Atkinson

30 April 2005	Southampton	4–3	Norwich City	Southampton, Hampshire
15:00 BST	Oakley 7'; Crouch 20'; Le Saux 39'; Camara 88'	Report	Bentley 3'; Higginbotham 31' (o.g.); McKenzie 45'	Stadium: St Mary's Stadium; Attendance: 31,944; Referee: Graham Poll

==== May ====
7 May 2005	Norwich City	1–0	Birmingham City	Norwich, Norfolk
15:00 BST	Ashton 45' (pen.)	Report	Johnson (red card) 31'	Stadium: Carrow Road; Attendance: 25,477; Referee: Steve Bennett

15 May 2005	Fulham	6–0	Norwich City	Fulham, London
15:00 BST	McBride 10', 86'; Diop 35'; Knight 54'; Malbranque 72'; Cole 90'	Report		Stadium: Craven Cottage; Attendance: 21,927; Referee: Steve Dunn

=== FA Cup ===
Round	3
Result	0–1

8 January 2005 Round 3	West Ham United	1–0	Norwich City	Upton Park, London
15:00 GMT	Harewood 81'	Report		Stadium: Boleyn Ground; Attendance: 23,389; Referee: Uriah Rennie

=== League Cup ===
Round	2	3
Result	1–0	1–2

21 September 2004 Round 2	Norwich City	1–0	Bristol Rovers	Norwich, Norfolk
19:45 BST	Safri 45'	Report	Elliott (yellow card) 87' (yellow-red card) 90'	Stadium: Carrow Road; Attendance: 18,658; Referee: Kevin Friend

27 October 2004 Round 3	Newcastle United	2–1	Norwich City	Newcastle upon Tyne, Tyne and Wear
19:45 BST	Jenas 2'; Ameobi 42' (pen.)	Report	Huckerby 56' (pen.)	Stadium: St James' Park; Attendance: 42,153; Referee: Phil Dowd

== First team squad ==
Note: Flags indicate national team as defined under FIFA eligibility rules; some limited exceptions apply. Players may hold more than one non-FIFA nationality.

No.	Pos.	Nation	Player
1	GK	ENG	Robert Green
3	DF	ENG	Adam Drury
4	MF	ENG	Graham Stuart
5	DF	ENG	Craig Fleming (captain)
6	FW	ENG	Darren Huckerby
7	MF	NIR	Philip Mulryne
8	MF	SCO	Gary Holt
9	MF	SWE	Mattias Jonson
10	FW	ENG	David Bentley (on loan from Arsenal)
11	DF	CAN	Jim Brennan
14	FW	ENG	Leon McKenzie
15	MF	MAR	Youssef Safri
16	DF	ENG	Simon Charlton

No.	Pos.	Nation	Player
17	DF	ENG	Marc Edworthy
18	FW	NIR	Paul McVeigh
19	FW	SWE	Mathias Svensson
20	MF	JAM	Damien Francis (Note: Francis was born in Wandsworth, England, but also qualified to represent Jamaica internationally and made his international debut for Jamaica in 2003.)
21	GK	WAL	Darren Ward (Note: Ward was born in Worksop, England, but also qualified to represent Wales internationally and made his international debut for Wales in June 2000.)
22	MF	ENG	Ian Henderson
23	FW	ENG	Ryan Jarvis
24	DF	ENG	Jason Shackell
26	DF	DEN	Thomas Helveg
27	DF	IRL	Gary Doherty
30	GK	ENG	Joe Lewis
36	FW	ENG	Dean Ashton

=== Out on loan ===
Note: Flags indicate national team as defined under FIFA eligibility rules; some limited exceptions apply. Players may hold more than one non-FIFA nationality.

No. / Pos. / Nation / Player; 12 / GK / SCO / Paul Gallacher (on loan to Sheffield Wednesday)	No. / Pos. / Nation / Player; 28 / FW / ENG / Danny Crow (on loan to Northampton Town)

=== Left club during season ===
Note: Flags indicate national team as defined under FIFA eligibility rules; some limited exceptions apply. Players may hold more than one non-FIFA nationality.

No.	Pos.	Nation	Player
2	DF	ENG	Keith Briggs (to Stockport County)
4	DF	SCO	Malky Mackay (to West Ham United)

No.	Pos.	Nation	Player
25	FW	ENG	Zema Abbey (to Wycombe Wanderers)
—	MF	ENG	Lee Blackburn (to Cambridge United)

== Transfers ==
=== In ===
Date	Nation	Position	Name	Club From	Fee
3 June 2004	(England)	MF	David Bentley	Arsenal	Season-long loan
25 June 2004	(Morocco)	MF	Youssef Safri	Coventry City	£500,000
13 July 2004	(England)	DF	Simon Charlton	Bolton Wanderers	£250,000
22 July 2004	(Denmark)	DF	Thomas Helveg	Inter Milan	Free
5 August 2004	(Sweden)	MF	Mattias Jonson	Brøndby	Undisclosed
6 August 2004	(Wales)	GK	Darren Ward	Nottingham Forest	undisclosed
20 August 2004	(Republic of Ireland)	DF	Gary Doherty	Tottenham Hotspur	£1,000,000
10 January 2005	(England)	FW	Dean Ashton	Crewe Alexandra	£4,450,000
31 January 2005	(England)	MF	Graham Stuart	Charlton Athletic	Undisclosed

=== Out ===
Date	Nation	Position	Name	Club From	Fee
29 April 2004	(Wales)	FW	Iwan Roberts	Released (Note: Roberts later joined Gillingham on 28 June)	Free
23 July 2004	(England)	MF	Mark Rivers	Crewe Alexandra	Free
5 August 2004	(England)	DF	Keith Briggs	Crewe Alexandra	One-month loan
10 September 2004	(Scotland)	DF	Malky Mackay	West Ham United	£300,000
25 September 2004	(England)	DF	Keith Briggs	Released (Note: Briggs later joined Stockport County on 14 January 2005)	Free
7 October 2004	(England)	FW	Zema Abbey	Wycombe Wanderers	Free
15 February 2005	(England)	FW	Danny Crow	Northampton Town	One-month loan (extended 23 March)
18 March 2005	(Scotland)	GK	Paul Gallacher	Sheffield Wednesday	One-month loan

== Final league table ==
Pos	Team	Pld	W	D	L	GF	GA	GD	Pts	Qualification or relegation
16	Portsmouth	38	10	9	19	43	59	−16	39	
17	West Bromwich Albion	38	6	16	16	36	61	−25	34	
18	Crystal Palace (R)	38	7	12	19	41	62	−21	33	Relegation to the Football League Championship
19	Norwich City (R)	38	7	12	19	42	77	−35	33	Relegation to the Football League Championship
20	Southampton (R)	38	6	14	18	45	66	−21	32	Relegation to the Football League Championship

Rules for classification: 1) points; 2) goal difference; 3) number of goals scored.
(R) Relegated
