= Bance =

Bance is a Swedish, French and English surname. Notable people with the surname include:

- Aristide Bancé (born 1984), Burkinabé footballer
- Danny Bance (born 1982), English footballer
- Libby Bance, English footballer
- Peter Bance, British Sikh historian, author, and art collector
