= Mark Fiore =

Mark Fiore may refer to:

- Mark Fiore (cartoonist) (born 1970), American cartoonist
- Mark Fiore (footballer) (born 1969), English footballer
