= Stuart Elliott =

Stuart or Stewart Elliott may refer to:

- Stuart Elliott (footballer, born 1977), English footballer
- Stuart Elliott (footballer, born 1978), Northern Ireland international footballer
- Stuart Elliott (drummer) (born 1965), English rock and session drummer

== See also ==
- Stewart Elliott, Canadian-American jockey
