= Stuart Elliott (footballer, born 1977) =

English association football player and manager

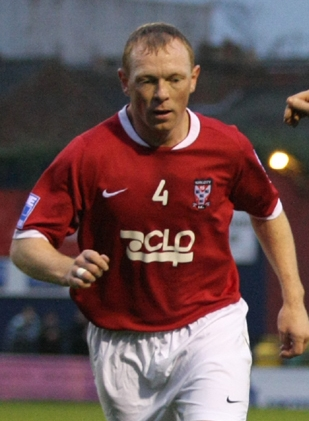
- Elliott playing for York City in 2007

Personal information
- Full name: Stuart Thomas Elliott
- Date of birth: 27 August 1977 (age 49)
- Place of birth: Hendon, England
- Height: 5 ft 9 in (1.75 m)
- Positions: Defender; midfielder

Team information
- Current team: Newcastle Benfield (manager)

Youth career
- 1993–1995: Arsenal
- 1995–1996: Newcastle United

Senior career*
Years	Team	Apps	(Gls)
1996–2000	Newcastle United	0	(0)
1997	→ Hull City (loan)	3	(0)
1998	→ Swindon Town (loan)	2	(0)
1998	→ Gillingham (loan)	5	(0)
1999	→ Hartlepool United (loan)	5	(0)
1999	→ Wrexham (loan)	9	(0)
1999–2000	→ AFC Bournemouth (loan)	8	(0)
2000	→ Stockport County (loan)	5	(0)
2000–2001	Darlington	24	(0)
2001	Plymouth Argyle	12	(0)
2001	Carlisle United	6	(0)
2001	Durham City		
2001–2002	Scarborough	8	(1)
2002	Exeter City	1	(0)
2002	Merthyr Tydfil	0	(0)
2002–2003	Halifax Town	12	(0)
2003	Harrogate Town	8	(0)
2003–2004	Harrow Borough	14	(1)
2004–2005	Waltham Forest		
2005	Gateshead	5	(1)
2005–2007	Northwich Victoria	64	(4)
2007–2008	York City	36	(3)
2008–2009	Grays Athletic	26	(1)
2009	Durham City		
2009–2013	Bedlington Terriers		
2013–2014	Newcastle Benfield		
2014–?	Ashington		
Total		253	(11)

Managerial career
- 2019–: Newcastle Benfield
- * Club domestic league appearances and goals

Stuart Thomas Elliott (born 27 August 1977) is an English football manager and former professional player who played as a defender or midfielder in the Football League for 11 clubs. He is the manager of Northern League Division One club Newcastle Benfield.

Elliott started his career as a schoolboy at Arsenal, and after being released by the club he signed an apprenticeship with Newcastle United in 1995. He spent five years with the club, during which time he was loaned out seven times. He never made a first-team appearance for Newcastle, but appeared on the substitutes' bench on six occasions and eventually became captain of the reserve team.

He left the club in 2000 to join Darlington, where he played for most of the 2000–01 season before joining Plymouth Argyle in 2001. He eventually dropped down to non-League football with Durham City and Scarborough, before making a brief return to the Football League with Exeter City in 2002. Since then, he has played in non-League football, mostly with Northwich Victoria and York City before joining Grays Athletic in 2008.

== Playing career ==
=== Early life and career ===
Born in Hendon, Greater London, Elliott started his career as a schoolboy with Arsenal's youth system in 1993 before being released by the club. He was then offered an apprenticeship with Newcastle United in August 1995, and on 29 August signed a professional contract with the club. He was promoted to the first-team squad at Newcastle in the 1996–97 season. He was named on the substitutes' bench for the first time for Newcastle in an away match against Southampton in the Premier League in January 1997, which was Kenny Dalglish's first match as manager. His first loan came on 28 February 1997 when he joined Hull City, and was sent off in the 90th minute of his debut in a 1–1 draw with Northampton Town on 1 March. He made three appearances for Hull before returning to Newcastle on 31 March 1997.

He joined Swindon Town on loan on 20 February 1998, making his debut in a 3–1 defeat away to Manchester City in the First Division the following day. He made two appearances during this spell with Swindon. The 1998–99 season saw Elliott loaned out to three clubs, the first being Gillingham for a one-month period on 23 October 1998. He made five appearances in the Second Division for them before his loan ended on 23 November 1998. A loan spell at Hartlepool United in the Third Division followed, whom he joined on 29 January 1999. He made five appearances for the club before returning to Newcastle on 1 March 1999. He joined Wrexham of the Second Division on loan on 22 March 1999, and on the following day made his debut in their 3–2 home defeat by Wigan Athletic in the Football League Trophy Northern final second leg. He made 10 appearances for the club before returning to his parent club at the end of 1998–99.

AFC Bournemouth signed him on loan on 3 December 1999, who he made eight Second Division appearances for in 1999–2000, having returned to Newcastle on 26 January 2000. His final loan spell was with Stockport County, whom he joined on 25 February 2000, where he played until the end of 1999–2000, making five First Division appearances. During his time at Newcastle, he was named as a first-team substitute on six occasions, but never made it onto the pitch. Elliott, however, was a regular in the Newcastle reserve team and eventually became the team's captain. His final Newcastle reserve appearance saw him win the Northumberland Senior Cup for the second time, after scoring a goal from 35 yards in the final against Newcastle Blue Star in May 2000.

=== 2000–2005 ===
After failing to break into the Newcastle first team, Elliott joined Third Division club Darlington on 21 July 2000. He made his debut in a 1–1 draw with Rochdale on 12 August 2000. His first goal in the professional game came against First Division team Nottingham Forest in a first round first-leg League Cup tie on 22 August 2000 after scoring a penalty kick. In the second-leg on 6 September 2000, Elliott scored with a 50-yard strike from the centre circle in the 85th minute, which gave Darlington a 2–1 away win over Forest, and 4–3 on aggregate. He made 33 appearances and scored four goals before moving to Plymouth Argyle on a free transfer on 8 March 2001. Elliott's debut came in a 3–0 home win over Third Division league leaders Chesterfield on 10 March 2001 and he finished 2000–01 with 12 appearances for Plymouth.

Following an impressive trial with Scarborough of the Football Conference during the 2001–02 pre-season, he was offered a contract by the club in August 2001. However, he instead joined Carlisle United for a one-month trial in August 2001, signing a short-term contract on 16 August. His debut came in a 0–0 away draw with Leyton Orient in the Third Division on 18 August 2001. After making seven appearances for the team, Elliott was released after not being offered a new contract and signed for non-League club Durham City, of the Northern League Division One, on 2 October 2001. Only several days later, he signed for Scarborough on 5 October 2001 as a replacement for Denny Ingram, making his debut in a 2–2 away draw against Boston United a day later. After making 10 appearances and scoring one goal for Scarborough he was offered a week-long trial with Exeter City in January 2002. After impressing for the reserves against Yeovil Town he signed for the club on 1 February 2002, but on a non-contract basis due to financial constraints at the club. He made one appearance for Exeter, as a substitute in a 2–1 away victory against Macclesfield Town in the Third Division on 2 February 2002.

Elliott again dropped down to non-League football when he signed for Merthyr Tydfil of the Southern League Premier Division on non-contract terms in April 2002, but did not feature for the team during the remainder of 2001–02. He spent the 2002–03 pre-season with newly promoted Northern Premier League Premier Division club Harrogate Town, playing in pre-season friendlies against Manchester United and former club Newcastle. Elliott signed for Halifax Town of the Football Conference on 14 August 2002, making 12 appearances before being released and joining Harrogate in March 2003. His first appearance came in a 4–1 home victory over Colwyn Bay on 8 March 2003 and he finished the season with eight appearances for Harrogate. Elliott spent the pre-season ahead of 2003–04 training with Harrow Borough of the Isthmian League Premier Division, before signing in August 2003. He made his debut in a 3–2 away defeat against Hitchin Town on 16 August 2003 and after making 14 appearances and scoring one goal for Harrow was released in January 2004, later that month signing for Isthmian League Division One North club Waltham Forest.

=== 2005–2007 ===
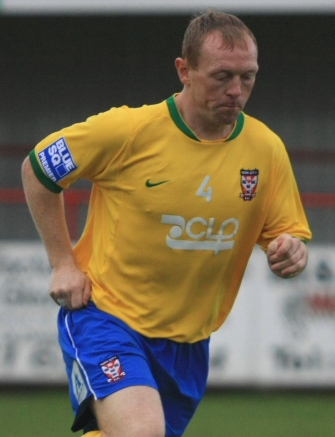
Elliott playing for York City in 2008

He signed for Northern Premier League Premier Division club Gateshead on 9 April 2005, making his debut a week later as a substitute in a 1–0 defeat away to Farsley Celtic. Elliott finished 2004–05 with five appearances and one goal for Gateshead before joining newly relegated Conference North club Northwich Victoria in June 2005. During a 2–1 win over Woking, Elliott scored the first goal, a victory which ensured a lucrative FA Cup tie with Premier League club Sunderland. The 2005–06 season saw him finally complete an entire season with one team, in which he made 46 appearances and scored three goals. Elliott was appointed club captain for 2006–07, after assisting the club in their instant return to the Conference National as Conference North champions. He was charged in December 2006 of using racially aggravated abusive language towards Halifax Town midfielder Tyrone Thompson in a match on 4 November, which he was later cleared of in April 2007. Following the completion of 2006–07, he was not named on the club's retained list, in which he made 32 appearances and scored two goals.

The opportunity arose to join York City in June 2007, and despite the efforts of Northwich chairman Mike Connett, Elliott signed for the Conference Premier club, along with former Northwich teammate Paul Brayson, on 25 June. He was sent off during his York debut, a 2–1 home defeat by Cambridge United on 11 August 2007, which resulted in him receiving a three-match ban. He was also sent off on 12 April 2008 against Woking along with Tom Evans and Darren Craddock; this proved to be his final appearance for York. Having made 46 appearances and scored three goals for York, Elliott was released at the end of 2007–08.

=== Later career ===
Elliott signed for Conference Premier club Grays Athletic on 7 May 2008. He was booked on his debut, a 3–1 away defeat by Weymouth on the opening day of 2008–09 on 9 August 2008, and picked up yellow cards in the two following matches. However, he scored a goal from 25 yards in the third match on 16 August 2008, which finished as a 2–1 home victory against Northwich Victoria. He picked up a hernia injury, which required him to undergo surgery in December 2008. He was transfer listed by the club in January 2009, with financial pressures and manager Wayne Burnett's plans cited as the reason. Following the departure of Burnett, Elliott took the role of assistant manager at Grays, alongside Jamie Stuart. He made his return from injury in a 2–1 home win over Altrincham on 7 March 2009. Elliott finished the season with 29 appearances and two goals.

He rejoined former club Durham City, newly promoted into the Northern Premier League Premier Division, in June 2009 along with Brayson. After Durham's financial problems led to all players being made available for transfer, he signed for Northern League Division One club Bedlington Terriers in September 2009, making a winning debut in the first qualifying round of the FA Vase. He was later appointed captain. He suffered a cruciate ligament injury before signing for Newcastle Benfield of the Northern League Division One in 2013. He returned to playing after a year out injured, and signed for Northern League Division One club Ashington on 3 August 2014.

== Managerial career ==
Elliott was announced as manager of Northern League Division One club Newcastle Benfield on 10 February 2019, before officially taking charge on 16 February. Previous manager Brayson remaining in charge until then, at which point he became Elliott's assistant. His first match in charge came on 16 February, with Benfield beating Ashington 1–0 away in the league. Elliott signed a new one-year contract on 26 April 2019 after leading Benfield to a 10th-place finish in the 2018–19 Northern League Division One. His contract was extended again on 31 October, to the end of the 2020–21 season.

== Style of play ==
Elliott started his career as a defender, but during his loan spells from Newcastle, he started to play as a midfielder. He was rated by former teammate Brayson as being "a tough-tackling midfielder whose attributes are winning the ball, passing it and talking."

== Career statistics ==
Appearances and goals by club, season and competition
Club	Season	League			FA Cup		League Cup		Other		Total	
Club	Season	Division	Apps	Goals	Apps	Goals	Apps	Goals	Apps	Goals	Apps	Goals
Newcastle United	1996–97	Premier League	0	0	0	0	0	0	0	0	0	0
Newcastle United	1997–98	Premier League	0	0	0	0	0	0	0	0	0	0
Newcastle United	1998–99	Premier League	0	0	0	0	—		0	0	0	0
Newcastle United	1999–2000	Premier League	0	0	0	0	0	0	0	0	0	0
Newcastle United	Total		0	0	0	0	0	0	0	0	0	0
Hull City (loan)	1996–97	Third Division	3	0	—		—		—		3	0
Swindon Town (loan)	1997–98	First Division	2	0	—		—		—		2	0
Gillingham (loan)	1998–99	Second Division	5	0	0	0	—		—		5	0
Hartlepool United (loan)	1998–99	Third Division	5	0	—		—		—		5	0
Wrexham (loan)	1998–99	Second Division	9	0	—		—		1 (Note: Appearance(s) in Football League Trophy)	0	10	0
AFC Bournemouth (loan)	1999–2000	Second Division	8	0	—		—		0	0	8	0
Stockport County (loan)	1999–2000	First Division	5	0	—		—		—		5	0
Darlington	2000–01	Third Division	24	0	2	0	4	3	3	1	33	4
Plymouth Argyle	2000–01	Third Division	12	0	—		—		—		12	0
Carlisle United	2001–02	Third Division	6	0	—		1	0	—		7	0
Scarborough	2001–02	Football Conference	8	1	1	0	—		1	0	10	1
Exeter City	2001–02	Third Division	1	0	—		—		—		1	0
Halifax Town	2002–03	Football Conference	12	0	0	0	—		0	0	12	0
Harrogate Town	2002–03	Northern Premier League; Premier Division	8	0	—		—		—		8	0
Harrow Borough	2003–04	Isthmian League Premier Division	14	1	1	0	—		—		15	1
Gateshead	2004–05	Northern Premier League; Premier Division	5	1	—		—		—		5	1
Northwich Victoria	2005–06	Conference North	38	3	5	0	—		3 (Note: Appearances in FA Trophy)	0	46	3
Northwich Victoria	2006–07	Conference National	26	1	2	0	—		4	0	32	1
Northwich Victoria	Total		64	4	7	0	—		7	0	78	4
York City	2007–08	Conference Premier	36	3	2	0	—		8 (Note: Six appearances in FA Trophy, two in Conference League Cup)	0	46	3
Grays Athletic	2008–09	Conference Premier	26	1	2	1	—		1 (Note: Appearance in Conference League Cup)	0	29	2
Career total			253	11	15	1	5	3	21	1	294	16

== Honours ==
Northwich Victoria

- Conference North: 2005–06
