= Paul McGregor (footballer) =

English footballer and singer (born 1974)

Personal information
- Full name: Paul Anthony McGregor
- Date of birth: 17 December 1974 (age 51)
- Place of birth: Liverpool, England
- Position: Striker

Youth career
- Nottingham Forest

Senior career*
Years	Team	Apps	(Gls)
1991–1999	Nottingham Forest	30	(3)
1998	→ Carlisle United (loan)	10	(3)
1999	→ Preston North End (loan)	3	(0)
1999–2001	Plymouth Argyle	77	(19)
2001–2003	Northampton Town	62	(5)
Total		182	(30)
- * Club domestic league appearances and goals

Paul Anthony McGregor (born 17 December 1974) is an English musician and former professional footballer, who is lead singer of the London-based punk band Ulterior where he is known under the stage name Honey.

As a footballer he was a striker from 1991 to 2003, notably playing in the Premier League and UEFA Cup for Nottingham Forest. He also appeared in the Football League for Carlisle United, Preston North End, Plymouth Argyle and Northampton Town before retiring from professional football at the age of 29 to take up a career in music.

== Football career ==
A product of the youth system at Nottingham Forest, McGregor made a number of first team appearances, although he did not quite manage to cement a regular spot in the line-up. Despite this he made some impact on the first team and is well remembered by the club's supporters for scoring the winning goal in a match against Olympique Lyonnais in the 1995–96 UEFA Cup, a goal which put Forest in the quarter-finals of the competition. Whilst at the club McGregor also sang with Britpop band Merc, although the group did not have any success.

Falling out of favour at Forest, McGregor spent spells on loan at Carlisle United and Preston North End before completing a permanent move to Plymouth Argyle in 1999. McGregor enjoyed a rich vein of form at Argyle and was the club's top scorer in the 1999–2000 season, hitting 16 goals in all competitions, including two hat-tricks. His form earned him the Plymouth Argyle F.C. Player of the Year award for 2000. The following season, however, the goals dried up and he moved on a free transfer to Northampton Town for a spell that was blighted by injury. Making his final appearance for the Cobblers as a substitute in a 2–0 defeat to Oldham in March 2003, McGregor left the game at the end of the 2002–3 season.

== Music career ==
Whilst a player with Nottingham Forest, he was part of a Britpop band called Merc, who played a gig at Rock City in Nottingham which was meant to be attended by Alan McGee, however he failed to turn up.

McGregor, now nicknamed "Honey", his brother, Benn (MCG), and guitarist Paul Simmons (Simmons) formed a three-piece band in late 2006, calling themselves Ulterior. Shortly after in 2007, Karl Januskevicius (Motorcycle Boy) joined Ulterior full-time on synthesizer helping to develop the band's sound.

After emerging onto the London scene with a string of live warehouse performances and their debut single "Weapons" in tow, Ulterior achieved a cult underground following. They were asked to support The Horrors at the Shockwaves NME Awards 2008 at The London Astoria. Ulterior followed up their hype with the collectable EP entitled 15, a limited edition 12" vinyl released in three different colours: white, cream and neon orange.

After having gained notoriety across Europe and the UK music scene for their live shows, "consistently playing some of the most intense gigs in the past couple of years" – The Quietus, and having also garnered attention from the gothic rock scene after touring throughout Europe with The Sisters of Mercy (9–23 March 2009), Ulterior released their follow-up single, a 10" double A side vinyl entitled "Sister Speed"/"Aporia".

2008 saw Januskevicius move onto bass guitar as the band's direction further evolved. In February 2009, Januskevicius quit the band citing health and personal problems on the eve of their European tour with The Sisters of Mercy. Januskevicius was replaced by Michael Ellis (Mickey).

Ulterior have featured in printed press such as NME, Stool Pigeon, Vice Magazine and Artrocker. They have worked with Zlaya Hadzic, a Bosnian born music producer based at Amsterdam's Studio 150. Hadzic has recorded and mixed for Sonic Youth and Tortoise.
