= Lee Blackburn =

English footballer

Personal information
- Full name: Lee Charles Blackburn
- Date of birth: 1 October 1985 (age 41)
- Place of birth: Hornchurch, England
- Height: 5 ft 8 in (1.73 m)
- Position: Midfielder

Senior career*
Years	Team	Apps	(Gls)
2005	Cambridge United	3	(0)
2005–2008	Crawley Town	98	(5)
- * Club domestic league appearances and goals

Lee Blackburn (born 1 October 1985) is an English footballer who plays for Isthmian League Division One North club Maldon & Tiptree.

== Career ==
Born in Hornchurch, Blackburn joined Crawley Town in 2005 from Cambridge United, where he made three appearances in League Two, having previously had spells at the Chelsea and Norwich City academies. Blackburn was released by Crawley in 2008.

== Career statistics ==
Appearances and goals by club, season and competition
Club	Season	League			FA Cup		League Cup		Other		Total	
Club	Season	Division	Apps	Goals	Apps	Goals	Apps	Goals	Apps	Goals	Apps	Goals
Cambridge United	2004–05	League Two	3	0	0	0	0	0	0	0	3	0
Crawley Town	2005–06	Conference Premier	34	0	0	0	—		1 (Note: Appearance(s) in EFL Trophy)	0	35	0
Crawley Town	2006–07	Conference Premier	41	4	0	0	—		0	0	41	4
Crawley Town	2007–08	Conference Premier	23	1	0	0	—		0	0	23	1
Crawley Town	Total		98	5	0	0	0	0	1	0	99	5
Career total			101	5	0	0	0	0	1	0	102	5
