= John Hodges (footballer) =

English footballer (born 1980)

Personal information
- Date of birth: 22 January 1980 (age 46)
- Place of birth: Leicester, England
- Position: Goalkeeper

Senior career*
Years	Team	Apps	(Gls)
1998–2000	Leicester City	0	(0)
2000–2001	Plymouth Argyle	2	(0)
Total		2	(0)
- * Club domestic league appearances and goals

John Hodges (born 22 January 1980) is an English retired footballer who played as a goalkeeper.

He began his career with Leicester City but did not make a first team appearance before being allowed to leave by new Leicester manager Peter Taylor. Hodges joined Plymouth Argyle on a free transfer in the summer of 2000, as back-up for first choice goalkeeper Jon Sheffield.

He made his league debut on 24 October 2000 against Brighton & Hove Albion, and went on to make another three appearances for the club during November, including two against Chester City in the FA Cup. He endured a season marred by injury and the emergence of Romain Larrieu, who would go on to become the club's first choice goalkeeper under new manager Paul Sturrock. He was released from his contract with the club at the end of the 2000–01 season, and retired from the professional game that summer due to injury.
