= Alan Gillett (football) =

English footballer and manager

Personal information
- Date of birth: c. 1948 (age 77–78)
- Place of birth: Kenya

Managerial career
- Years: Team
- 1977: Yemen
- 1992: Plymouth Argyle (caretaker)
- 2003: Malawi (caretaker)
- 2004–2005: Solomon Islands
Medal record
Men's football
Representing Solomon Islands (as manager)
OFC Nations Cup
Runner-up	2004 Australia

Alan Gillett is an English football coach who has worked primarily in England for The Football Association and a number of club sides.

== Career ==
Gillett has been involved in the management of Watford, Crystal Palace and Wimbledon, and was caretaker manager of Plymouth Argyle, alongside Gordon Nisbet, for two games in 1992. Gillett was later sacked by Plymouth Argyle, and launched a successful legal challenge to his dismissal. Gillett has also coached in Japan, Yemen and the United States.

Gillett was appointed caretaker manager of the Malawi national side in 2003. Gillett was manager of the Solomon Islands from 2004 to 2005.

He has also worked with the England under 18s squad.

== Honours ==
=== Manager ===
Solomon Islands

- OFC Nations Cup: runner-up 2004
