= Tom Kaak =

Dutch footballer

Personal information
- Full name: Anton Christian Kaak
- Date of birth: 31 March 1978 (age 48)
- Place of birth: Winterswijk, Netherlands
- Position: Forward

Senior career*
Years	Team	Apps	(Gls)
1996–1998	De Graafschap	0	(0)
1998–2000	Heracles Almelo	16	(1)
2000–2001	Darlington	8	(2)
2001	Clydebank	2	(1)
2001–2003	IJsselmeervogels		
2003–2005	DVS '33		
2005–2012	SV Grol		
- * Club domestic league appearances and goals

Anton Christian "Tom" Kaak (born 31 March 1978) is a Dutch former professional footballer who played in The Football League for Darlington. He also played for Clydebank in Scotland.
