= Marc Edworthy =

English footballer (born 1972)

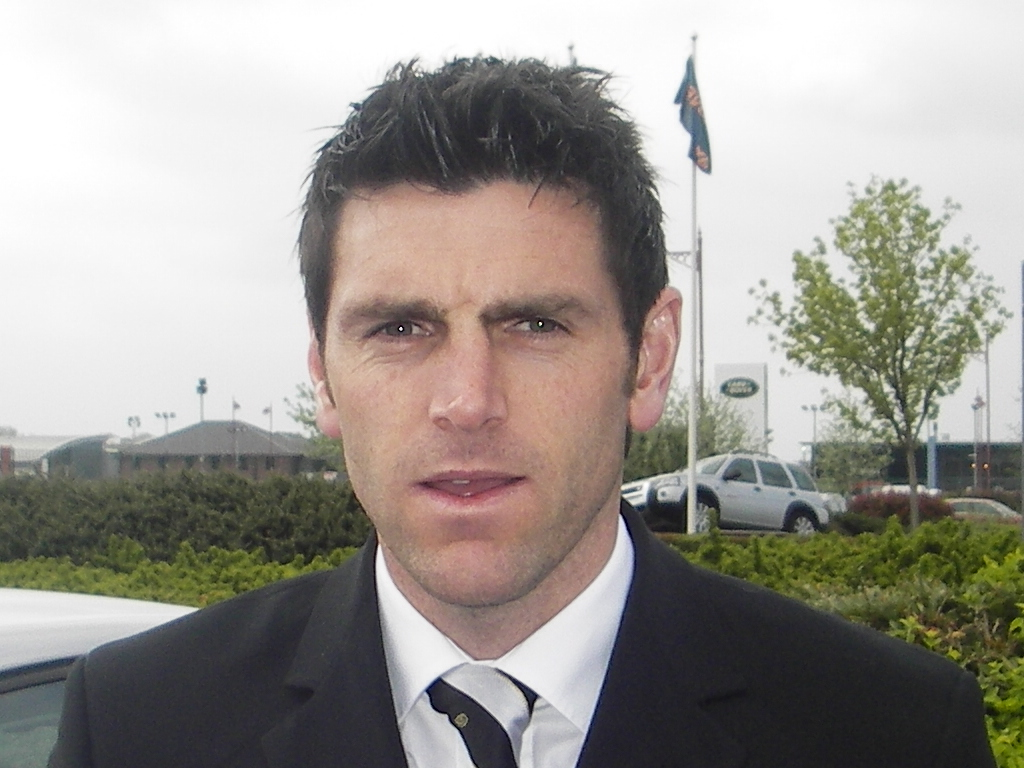
- Edworthy with Derby County in 2006

Personal information
- Date of birth: 24 December 1972 (age 53)
- Place of birth: Barnstaple, England
- Height: 1.79 m (5 ft 10 in)
- Position: Defender

Senior career*
Years	Team	Apps	(Gls)
1991–1995	Plymouth Argyle	69	(1)
1995–1998	Crystal Palace	126	(0)
1998–2002	Coventry City	76	(1)
2002–2003	Wolverhampton Wanderers	22	(0)
2003–2005	Norwich City	71	(0)
2005–2008	Derby County	77	(0)
2008–2009	Leicester City	5	(0)
2009	Burton Albion	1	(0)
Total		447	(2)
- * Club domestic league appearances and goals

Marc Edworthy (born 24 December 1972) is an English former professional footballer. He started out playing as a right winger before being moved to right-back. He was also occasionally deployed at left back and in central defence.

== Career ==
=== Plymouth Argyle ===
Edworthy was born in Barnstaple. He began his career with Plymouth Argyle in the 1991–92 season.

=== Crystal Palace ===
Edworthy joined Crystal Palace who had just been relegated from the Premiership on 9 June 1995 for £350,000, and in his second season with the Eagles played an integral role in winning promotion to the Premier League. However, the next season Palace finished bottom and were relegated once more; in spite of this the Palace fans acknowledged Edworthy's performances and rewarded him with the supporters player of the year award. He scored once during his spell at Palace, his strike coming against Bury in the League Cup in September 1996.

=== Coventry City ===
On 26 August 1998, he was bought by Premiership side Coventry City for £1,200,000. He scored his first and what turned out to be only goal for Coventry in a 1–1 draw with Manchester City on 1 January 2001. With the Sky Blues he again suffered relegation, this time from the Premiership. He left at the end of the 2001–02 season to join Wolverhampton Wanderers.

=== Wolverhampton Wanderers ===
Edworthy started his Wolves career on 31 August 2002, helping them earn promotion to the Premier League via the playoffs, but left after just one season to join Norwich City on a free transfer.

=== Norwich City ===
In his first season with Norwich City he helped the Canaries win promotion to the Premier League. But again, he suffered relegation when Norwich finished in 19th place. He left in the summer of 2005 to join Derby County, after a contract dispute with Norwich manager Nigel Worthington led to him becoming a free agent when his two-year deal expired.

=== Derby County ===
He was a member of the Derby squad that won promotion to the Premier League via the play-offs at the end of the 2006–07 season, being voted second in the Player of the Season contest along the way. He was appointed as a club ambassador at Pride Park in 2017.

=== Leicester City ===
Edworthy signed for Leicester City on 7 November 2008, signing a two-month contract that will see him stay at the club until 6 January 2009. He made his debut in Leicester's 3–0 FA Cup first round victory over Stevenage Borough, playing the full 90 minutes. On 6 January 2009 Edworthy agreed to stay at Leicester until the end of the 2008–09 season.

On 29 May, he was released at the end of his contract by Leicester alongside Paul Henderson, Patrick Kisnorbo, Bruno Ngotty and Barry Hayles.

=== Burton Albion ===
Edworthy was signed for Football League new boys Burton Albion on 4 August 2009, on a one-month contract by former Derby teammate Paul Peschisolido. He played in Burton's first ever Football League match at Shrewsbury Town but did not play again and was released after his contract expired. In October 2009, Edworthy announced his retirement after playing over 500 senior games in his 18-year career.

== Career statistics ==
Appearances and goals by club, season and competition
Season	Club	League			FA Cup		League Cup		Europe		Other (Note: Includes EFL Trophy & the play-offs.)		Total	
Season	Club	Division	Apps	Goals	Apps	Goals	Apps	Goals	Apps	Goals	Apps	Goals	Apps	Goals
Plymouth Argyle	1991–92	Second Division	15	0	1	0	0	0	—		0	0	16	0
Plymouth Argyle	1992–93	Second Division	15	0	0	0	4	0	—		1	0	20	0
Plymouth Argyle	1993–94	Second Division	12	0	3	0	1	0	—		1	0	17	0
Plymouth Argyle	1994–95	Second Division	27	1	3	0	2	0	—		1	0	34	1
Plymouth Argyle	Total		69	1	7	0	7	0	0	0	3	0	86	1
Crystal Palace	1995–96	First Division	44	0	2	0	4	0	—		3	0	53	0
Crystal Palace	1996–97	First Division	45	0	2	0	3	1	—		3	0	53	1
Crystal Palace	1997–98	Premier League	34	0	4	0	1	0	—		—		39	0
Crystal Palace	1998–99	First Division	3	0	—		1	0	2	0	—		6	0
Crystal Palace	Total		126	0	8	0	9	1	2	0	6	0	151	1
Coventry City	1998–99	Premier League	22	0	1	0	—		—		—		23	0
Coventry City	1999–2000	Premier League	10	0	0	0	2	0	—		—		12	0
Coventry City	2000–01	Premier League	24	1	2	0	2	0	—		—		28	1
Coventry City	2001–02	First Division	20	0	1	0	1	0	—		—		22	0
Coventry City	Total		76	1	4	0	5	0	0	0	0	0	85	1
Wolverhampton Wanderers	2002–03	First Division	22	0	0	0	1	0	—		0	0	23	0
Norwich City	2003–04	First Division	43	0	1	0	1	0	—		—		45	0
Norwich City	2004–05	Premier League	28	0	1	0	1	0	—		—		30	0
Norwich City	Total		71	0	2	0	2	0	0	0	0	0	75	0
Derby County	2005–06	Championship	30	0	1	0	1	0	—		—		32	0
Derby County	2006–07	Championship	38	0	1	0	1	0	—		1	0	41	0
Derby County	2007–08	Premier League	9	0	2	0	0	0	—		—		11	0
Derby County	Total		77	0	4	0	2	0	0	0	1	0	84	0
Leicester City	2008–09	League One	5	0	3	0	—		—		—		8	0
Burton Albion	2009–10	League Two	1	0	—		0	0	—		1	0	2	0
Career total			447	2	28	0	26	1	2	0	11	0	514	3

== Honours ==
Crystal Palace

- Football League First Division play-offs: 1997

Wolverhampton Wanderers

- Football League First Division play-offs: 2003

Norwich City

- Football League First Division: 2003–04

Derby County

- Football League Championship play-offs: 2007
