= Mark Fiore (footballer) =

English footballer (born 1969)

Personal information
- Full name: Mark Joseph Fiore
- Date of birth: 18 November 1969 (age 56)
- Place of birth: Southwark, England
- Position: Midfielder

Senior career*
Years	Team	Apps	(Gls)
1988–1990	Wimbledon	1	(0)
1990–1992	Plymouth Argyle	83	(8)
1992–1999	Slough Town	176	(19)
1999	Walton & Hersham		
1999–2000	Chesham United		
2000	Chalfont St Peter		
2000–2002	Windsor & Eton		
2002–2004	Flackwell Heath		
Total		260	(27)
- * Club domestic league appearances and goals

Mark Fiore (born 18 November 1969) in Southwark, Greater London, is an English former professional footballer who played in the Football League as a midfielder.

== Sources ==
- Mark Fiore at Slough Town
- Profile at PlayerHistory
