= The Stool Pigeon (newspaper) =

UK magazine

- Cover of the July 2012 issue of The Stool Pigeon
- Editor: Phil Hebblethwaite
- Frequency: Bimonthly
- Circulation: 53,676
- Publisher: Junko Partners Publishing
- Founder: Mickey Gibbons, Phil Hebblethwaite
- First issue: January 2005
- Final issue: December/January 2013
- Country: United Kingdom
- Based in: London
- Language: English
- Website: thestoolpigeon.co.uk

The Stool Pigeon was an independent bi-monthly free UK music newspaper, printed in the format of a Victorian tabloid. It was founded in 2005 by designer Mickey Gibbons and editor Phil Hebblethwaite and had a circulation of more than 50,000.

== Description ==
The Stool Pigeon was founded in 2005, with £10,000 in start-up funds provided by a Levi's marketing executive and former house music producer who liked the name, because he had once made a successful record sampling Stool Pigeon by Kid Creole and the Coconuts. The initial print run of 10,000 had grown to 60,000 copies after five years, with five issues appearing per year, distributed free in 72 towns and cities. The paper's articles are written by established music journalists (some contributing pseudonymously), industry figures and musicians.

Founded by magazine designer Mickey Gibbons, The Stool Pigeon had a strong print identity that was modelled on Victorian tabloids. According to editor Hebblethwaite, "This is a love affair with the printed word. We go to libraries to study old newspapers – we will never just be a website, and I've never thought of the internet as a threat. In a way, Stool Pigeon is the equivalent of a vinyl record." As for its editorial philosophy, Hebblethwaite has said, "It will never follow hype, shake the oily hands of those who wish to influence her, lick the arses of musicians, or print top 10 lists."

The Stool Pigeon also contained a pull-out comics section, which featured early work by Luke Pearson, Ben Jennings, and Krent Able.

Stool Pigeon ceased publication with its last issue December/January 2013.

== Reception ==
Michael Hann, writing for The Guardian, said that what set the paper apart was its unconventional presentation style, with word plays in headlines such as "Wet Paint dripping in confidence at dry run for Bloc Party tour" or "Wolf People as good as a bit of howl's your father". According to TransitionTradition, The Stool Pigeon offered "a candid, if not sometimes ruthless, response to the music industry from the inside outwards".

A 2011 article in Music Week reported that The Stool Pigeon had an average readership in excess of 50,000 readers in the UK and Ireland, putting it ahead of titles like Kerrang! and NME. The paper was also available in Berlin.

== Other Publications ==
Two books were made and published as side products to the paper. "We Need You Lazzaro, You Lazy, Greasy Bastard" which was a collection of pieces by their longest running columnist Son Of Dave. A collection of their feature interviews with celebrities such as Grace Jones and Sir Paul McCartney was titled "Grace Under Pressure"
