= Martin Barlow =

English footballer

Personal information
- Full name: Martin David Barlow
- Date of birth: 25 June 1971 (age 55)
- Place of birth: Barnstaple, England
- Position: Midfielder

Senior career*
Years	Team	Apps	(Gls)
1989–2001	Plymouth Argyle	328	(24)
2001	→ Yeovil Town (loan)	1	(0)
2001–2002	Exeter City	30	(0)
2002	Weymouth	0	(0)
2002–2003	Telford United	30	(2)
Total		389	(26)
- * Club domestic league appearances and goals

Martin David Barlow (born 25 June 1971) is an English former footballer who played in the Football League for Plymouth Argyle and Exeter City. He also played in the Football Conference for Yeovil Town and Telford United. He was a midfielder.

== Life and career ==
Barlow was born in Barnstaple. He began his career as an apprentice with Football League club Plymouth Argyle and progressed through the club's youth system to make his first team debut on 6 May 1989 in a 3–1 win against Oxford United. Barlow signed his first professional contract in July 1989. He spent the next 12 years at Home Park, helping the club reach the play-offs for the first time in 1994. He won promotion with the club in 1996 at Wembley Stadium, and shared the club's Player of the Year award, in recognition of his performances that season, in 1998 with Carlo Corazzin. He appeared in the match where goalkeeper Jimmy Glass scored a stoppage-time goal to keep Carlisle United in the Football League in 1999. He spent time on loan with Football Conference side Yeovil Town in 2001 before being released. Barlow spent one season with Exeter City, making 30 league appearances, and then joined Weymouth on a short-term contract. He retired in 2003 after playing in the Football Conference for one season with Telford United. He is an active member of Argyle Legends.

Martin Barlow is currently a successful car salesperson within the City he played for so many years at Murray Hyundai.

== Honours ==
Plymouth Argyle

- Football League Third Division play-offs: 1996

Individual

- Plymouth Argyle Player of the Year: 1997–98
