= Steve McCall =

English footballer (born 1960)

Personal information
- Full name: Stephen Harold McCall
- Date of birth: 15 October 1960 (age 66)
- Place of birth: Carlisle, England
- Height: 5 ft 11 in (1.80 m)
- Position: Defensive midfielder

Team information
- Current team: Carlisle United (scout)

Youth career
- 1978–1979: Ipswich Town

Senior career*
Years	Team	Apps	(Gls)
1979–1987	Ipswich Town	257	(7)
1987–1992	Sheffield Wednesday	29	(2)
1990	→ Carlisle United (loan)	6	(0)
1992–1996	Plymouth Argyle	100	(5)
1996–1998	Torquay United	39	(1)
1998–2000	Plymouth Argyle	33	(1)
2000–2001	Workington	?	(?)
Total		464	(16)

International career
1978	England Youth	4	(0)
1981–1982	England U21	6	(0)
1984	England B	1	(0)
- * Club domestic league appearances and goals

Stephen Harold McCall (born 15 October 1960) is an English retired footballer who now works as a scout for Carlisle United.

A defensive midfielder during his playing days, McCall built a reputation as a cultured midfield player, with immaculate passing ability. He began his career with Ipswich Town and quickly progressed to the first team under the management of Bobby Robson. McCall helped the club win the UEFA Cup in 1981, and he went on to win six England U21 caps during the next year. He left Portman Road in 1987, having made more than 300 appearances for the club, to join Sheffield Wednesday. His time with them was blighted by injury, and he spent time on loan with his home town club, Carlisle United in 1990. Two years later, he joined Plymouth Argyle and became a key player for Peter Shilton's side. He won the club's Player of the Year award in his first two full seasons at Home Park.

He briefly managed the club in 1995 following the departure of Shilton and stayed on as a member of the playing squad when Neil Warnock was appointed. He then moved to Torquay United in 1996 as a player-coach for Kevin Hodges and returned to Home Park two years later with Hodges. He went into non-league football in 2000 with Workington, where he finished his playing career. Following retirement, he returned to Ipswich Town, initially as a scout and then as a coach. Under the management of Paul Jewell, he was made chief scout but left the club in July 2014. In September 2014 he joined Colchester United in a similar role.

In February 2022, he was appointed as a scout for Carlisle United.

== Playing career ==
=== Ipswich Town ===
He made his name at Ipswich Town, where his greatest achievement was winning the UEFA Cup in the 1980/81 season, beating AZ Alkmaar 5–4 on aggregate, with McCall playing an influential part in his team's victory. He grabbed his opportunity in the 1st team, when George Burley was side-lined through injury for several months. He joined Ipswich in 1978 as an apprentice, being scouted from the north-west where Town legend Kevin Beattie was also born, and went on to make 329 appearances for Town, standing as a club record of consecutive appearances until 2001, being beaten by the goalkeeper Richard Wright. During this time he received one B cap against New Zealand. McCall scored 11 goals in his 9 seasons at Ipswich before he was sold for £300,000 to Sheffield Wednesday.

=== Sheffield Wednesday ===
His time at Sheffield Wednesday was less successful, as he spent much of his 4 seasons sidelined with a range of injuries, limiting his collection of appearances to only 36, scoring only 2 goals. In the midst of an unfortunate run at Wednesday, McCall achieved a childhood dream by being loaned to his hometown team Carlisle United, where he spent only a few months making 6 appearances without a goal. He contributed 5 appearances to Wednesday's run in the 1990–91 Football League Cup, but was not part of the match day squad as they won the final.

=== Plymouth Argyle ===
Towards the end of the 1991–92 season, McCall was sold to Plymouth Argyle for £25,000. He was named the club's player of the season two consecutive times (1993 and 1994), only the second player in Argyle's history to achieve such a title (the other being Paul Mariner, one of McCall's ex-teammates). As if given a new lease of life, McCall enjoyed a period of rich form in his two occasions at Plymouth, making 275 appearances in 6 years at the club. In 1995 McCall enjoyed a short reign as Plymouth's caretaker manager before he was replaced by Neil Warnock.

=== Torquay United ===
Sandwiched between his two spells at Plymouth, McCall joined Torquay United for free from 12 July 1996 to 24 June 1998, joining his former Plymouth teammate and manager Kevin Hodges in Torquay United's management team. In the 1997–98 season, McCall lived another childhood ambition – to play at Wembley, when Torquay played out a close fought match against Colchester United. The dream of playoff glory was short lived however, as the favourites for promotion were beaten 1–0 by a Colchester penalty. The close season saw Plymouth's manager Mick Jones lose his job, and Hodges and McCall took the position at their former club, in a reign that lasted a further two years.

=== Return to Plymouth Argyle ===
McCall's playing career ended in 2000 at Plymouth Argyle. He appeared in the famous Jimmy Glass game against his hometown club Carlisle, in which the goalkeeper scored in the 94th minute to keep Carlisle United in the Football League.

== Coaching career ==
In 2001, McCall hooked up with his former teammate and close friend George Burley as a European scouting co-ordinator at Ipswich Town, and progressed through the ranks initially as a scout, and when Joe Royle took over, became the Reserve Team Manager and the First Team Coach. He works as a chief scout for Colchester United working for another ex-Ipswich Town player John McGreal.

== Career statistics ==
Club	Joined	Left	Joining Fee	League		FA Cup		League Cup		Other	
Club	Joined	Left	Joining Fee	Apps.	Goals	Apps.	Goals	Apps.	Goals	Apps.	Goals
Ipswich Town	5 October 1978	3 June 1987	Apprentice	249 (8)	7	23 (1)	1	29 (0)	0	18 (1)	3
Sheffield Wednesday	3 June 1987	26 March 1992	£300,000	21 (8)	2	1 (0)	0	2 (3)	0	0 (1)	0
Carlisle United	8 February 1990		LOAN	6 (0)	0	0 (0)	0	0 (3)	0	0 (1)	0
Plymouth Argyle	26 March 1992	12 July 1996	£25,000	97 (3)	4	6 (0)	0	5 (0)	0	6 (0)	0
Torquay United	12 July 1996	24 June 1998	Free	32 (7)	1	0 (0)	0	3 (1)	0	2 (0)	1
Plymouth Argyle	24 June 1998	4 October 2000	Free	125 (8)	5	10 (2)	0	8 (1)	0	6 (0)	1

=== International ===
GAME	DATE	VENUE	TYPE
England U21 vs Switzerland	31 May 1981	Neuenburg, Switzerland	EC Qualifier
England U21 vs Hungary	5 June 1981	Keszthely, Hungary	Friendly
England U21 vs Hungary	17 November 1981	City Ground, Nottingham	EC Qualifier
England U21 vs Scotland	28 April 1982	Maine Round, Manchester	EC Qualifier
England U21 vs West Germany	21 September 1982	Bramall Lane, Sheffield	EC Qualifier
England U21 vs West Germany	12 October 1982	Weser Stadium, Bremen	EC Qualifier
England B vs New Zealand	13 November 1984	City Ground, Nottingham	

== Honours ==
=== As a player ===
Ipswich Town

- UEFA Cup: 1981

Sheffield Wednesday

- Football League Cup: 1991

Individual

- Plymouth Argyle Player of the Year: 1992–93, 1993–94
- Ipswich Town Hall of Fame: Inducted 2017
