= Danny Bance =

English footballer

Personal information
- Full name: Daniel Robert Bance
- Date of birth: 27 September 1982 (age 44)
- Place of birth: Plymouth, England
- Position: Midfielder

Senior career*
Years	Team	Apps	(Gls)
2000–2002	Plymouth Argyle	1	(0)
2002–2003	Taunton Town		
2003–2010	St Blazey		
2010	Liskeard Athletic		
2010–2013	Bodmin Town		
2026–	Liskeard Athletic Reserves		
- * Club domestic league appearances and goals

Daniel Robert Bance (born 27 September 1982) is an English footballer who plays as a midfielder for Liskeard Athletic Reserves.

Bance was born in Plymouth. He began his career as an apprentice with Football League club Plymouth Argyle and progressed through the club's youth system to make his first team debut on 16 April 2001 in a 3–0 defeat at Kidderminster Harriers. He was substituted after 49 minutes and it proved to be his only appearance in the professional game. Bance joined Southern League side Weymouth on trial in July 2001 with a view to joining the club on loan. He was released by Plymouth Argyle in the summer of 2002 and then signed a two-year contract with Taunton Town. He then joined St Blazey, where he won the South Western League championship in 2005 and 2007, and later captained the side. Bance moved to Liskeard Athletic in January 2010. Seven months later, he signed for Bodmin Town.

== Honours ==
St Blazey

- South Western League: 2004–2005, 2006–2007
