= Gordon Nisbet =

English footballer and manager

Personal information
- Full name: Gordon James Mackay Nisbet
- Date of birth: 18 September 1951 (age 75)
- Place of birth: Wallsend, England
- Height: 5 ft 10 in (1.78 m)
- Position: Right back

Youth career
- Northumberland Schools

Senior career*
Years	Team	Apps	(Gls)
1969–1976	West Bromwich Albion	136	(0)
1976–1980	Hull City	193	(1)
1980–1987	Plymouth Argyle	281	(14)
1987–1988	Exeter City	12	(0)
Total		622	(15)

International career
1972	England U23	1	(0)

Managerial career
- 1992: Plymouth Argyle (caretaker)
- * Club domestic league appearances and goals

Gordon James Mackay Nisbet (born 18 September 1951) is an English retired professional footballer who made over 600 league appearances in English football. Nisbet began his career as a goalkeeper but was later converted into a right back.

== Club career ==
Born in Wallsend, Nisbet played youth football for Northumberland Schools. When he left school at the age of eighteen in 1969, he signed for West Bromwich Albion, and also played league football for Hull City, Plymouth Argyle and Exeter City.

== International career ==
Nisbet earned one cap for the England under-23 team in 1972.

== Coaching career ==
Nisbet was caretaker manager of Plymouth Argyle, alongside Alan Gillett, for two games in 1992.

== After football ==
After finishing his professional football career in 1988, Nisbet continued to play non-League football, and later joined the Devon and Cornwall Police.
