= 2011–12 Plymouth Argyle F.C. season =

English football club season

Plymouth Argyle F.C.
2011–12 season
- Chairman: James Brent
- Manager: Peter Reid (sacked 18 September 2011); Carl Fletcher
- Stadium: Home Park
- League Two: 21st
- FA Cup: First Round (knocked out by Stourbridge)
- League Cup: First Round (knocked out by Millwall)
- League Trophy: First Round (knocked out by Exeter)
- Top goalscorer: League: Simon Walton (9); All: Simon Walton (9)
- Highest home attendance: 12,386 vs. Torquay United (2 January 2012)
- Lowest home attendance: League: 5,018 vs. Port Vale (20 September 2011); All: 4,781 vs. Millwall (9 August 2011)
- Average home league attendance: 6,915
Home colours	Away colours

The 2011–12 season was Plymouth Argyle's 100th as a professional football club, their 87th as a member of the Football League and their sixth in Football League Two, the fourth tier of the English football league system. The season marked Argyle's 125th anniversary since founding in 1886.

== Background ==
The 2010–11 season was the club's 39th in the third tier of the English football league system, having been relegated from the Football League Championship the previous season. It was their first campaign at that level for six years and Peter Reid's first season in charge since becoming the club's manager. Argyle began the season by picking up four points from their opening two matches, but they struggled for consistency over the next two months, winning four of their next 15 league matches. The club was firmly established in mid-table when they received a winding-up petition from HM Revenue & Customs over unpaid taxes in November, the third in the space of a year. A number of players were sold in January to raise funds, including top goalscorer Bradley Wright-Phillips, midfielder Craig Noone and defender Réda Johnson for six-figure fees. As a result, the team's form dipped and they lost nine of their next ten matches. The club was docked ten points by the Football League in February for issuing a notice of intention to appoint an administrator, which left Argyle bottom of the table.

Two weeks later, the club's directors put the club into administration. The team won six of their next 11 matches, but relegation to League Two was confirmed at the start of May in their penultimate match of the season. Argyle finished 23rd in the league table, having taken 42 points from 46 matches. They finished above Swindon Town, but were six points below Walsall, who stayed up on the last day of the season. Having been in negotiations over a takeover with interested parties, nine first team players out of contract at the end of June were released by the club. They included defenders Marcel Seip and Krisztián Timár, Scottish players Chris Clark, Steve MacLean and Jim Paterson, midfielders Anton Peterlin and Luke Summerfield, forward Rory Fallon and Karl Duguid. The only player to be offered a new contract was Frenchman Stéphane Zubar, while captain Carl Fletcher agreed to stay by taking up the option of a further 12 months on his deal. First year professional Ryan Leonard was also released, and among the apprentices that were allowed to leave was Matt Rickard, who made one appearance for the first team in 2010–11. In June, Yannick Bolasie was transferred to Bristol City, and Kári Árnason was released after refusing to sign a wage deferral.

== Review ==
=== Pre-season ===
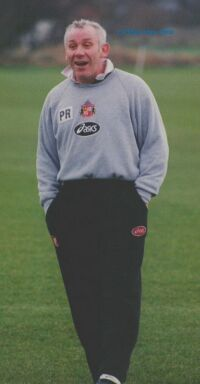
The 2011–12 season was Peter Reid's second as the club's manager.

The squad returned for pre-season training on 4 July. They were joined by defenders Durrell Berry and Robbie Williams, who agreed to join the club having been released by Aston Villa and Rochdale respectively at the end of last season, and two trialists; former Oldham Athletic forward Andy Crompton and Norwich City player Luke Daley. Later that day, defender Bondz N'Gala completed a transfer to Yeovil Town. Liam Dickinson, a former Barnsley striker, joined the squad on 5 July after agreeing to join the club on a free transfer. On 10 July, forward Joe Mason joined Cardiff City for an undisclosed fee. Two more trialists took part in training the next day; goalkeeper Jake Cole and French defender Ladjie Soukouna, while youngsters Jamie Richards and Luke Young signed their first professional contracts. Reid chose against pursuing his interest in Crompton. Argyle began their schedule of nine pre-season friendlies by defeating South West Peninsula League side Torpoint Athletic by two goals to one on 12 July. Winger Jed Harper-Penman scored both goals for a young Argyle team.

The contract of Dickinson was cancelled the next day for personal reasons. Argyle faced Championship club Bristol City at Home Park on 15 July. Included in the team were three more trialists; former Millwall player Kiernan Hughes-Mason, Rochdale forward Anthony Elding and Blackburn Rovers striker Tom Hitchcock. The visitors won 3–2, with Hughes-Mason and Hitchcock scoring for Argyle. A team made up solely of the club's youth system played Western League side Barnstaple Town the next day. A brace from Matt Lecointe and further goals from Tyler Harvey and Ben Clarvis earned a 4–4 draw for the away side. Northern Irish forward Rory Patterson left the club later in the day to join Linfield on loan until the end of the season. Four new trialists joined the squad on 18 July; Argentine winger Andrés Gurrieri, former Everton and Birmingham City youngsters Gerard Kinsella and Shane Williams, and former Preston North End player Simon Whaley, while Hughes-Mason was allowed to leave. Stéphane Zubar returned to the club on 19 July after accepting the offer of a new contract.

Terms were agreed with trialists Daley and Soukouna, and an agreement was reached with Blackburn Rovers to sign Hitchcock on loan for three months. Midfielder Damien Johnson completed a return to Huddersfield Town on a season-long loan, while former Barnet player Cole agreed to sign. Romain Larrieu's testimonial match took place on 20 July 2011 against Premier League club Queens Park Rangers. Argyle lost 1–0 in an even contest at Home Park. Two days later, a young team defeated local South West Peninsula League side Elburton Villa 3–1 at Haye Road, with LeCointe, Isaac Vassell and Harvey scoring for Argyle. Three trialists joined the squad on 25 July: French striker Joseph Mendes, and midfielders Joe Holt and Conor Hourihane, while Elding, Whaley and Shane Williams departed. A hat-trick from LeCointe earned a youthful Argyle side a 3–3 draw at Western League club Bridport on 26 July.

The next day, Conference South side Truro City were defeated 2–1 at Home Park, with Fletcher and Hourihane scoring the goals for the hosts. Goals from Mendes and youth team player Colin Watson helped Argyle defeat Tavistock of the South West Peninsula League by three goals to one at Langsford Park on 29 July; the third was an own goal. Hourihane joined the club permanently the next day, signing from Ipswich Town on a free transfer. Holt, Mendes and Nikolaj Misiuk, a Lithuanian striker who had played against Tavistock, were informed that they would not be offered contracts. Kinsella's trial was ended due to a knee injury that required surgery. Argyle defeated South West Peninsula League side Saltash United 1–0 in their final pre-season friendly at Kimberly Stadium on 1 August. The only goal of the game was scored by Hitchcock. Middlesbrough defender Ben Gibson joined the club on loan for three months. Northern Ireland international Warren Feeney joined the club on a free transfer on 4 August after being released by Oldham Athletic.

=== August ===
Argyle began the season with a 1–1 draw at Shrewsbury Town on 6 August. A late goal from Carl Fletcher cancelled out James Collins' opener for the home side. Three days later, the club took on Millwall in the first round of the League Cup at Home Park. Dany N'Guessan scored the only goal of the game to eliminate Argyle from the competition. Hull City midfielder Will Atkinson joined the club on loan for the rest of the season. He scored the opening goal in a 4–1 defeat against Rotherham United on 13 August. Gareth Evans and Adam Le Fondre both scored twice for Rotherham. A third consecutive defeat followed as Argyle lost 2–0 at home to AFC Wimbledon. Two second half goals from Jack Midson was the difference between the teams. Gillingham scored three late goals at Priestfield Stadium on 20 August after Gibson was sent off for two bookable offences. Danny Kedwell converted two penalties and Luke Rooney added the other.

Zubar's contract was cancelled on 25 August after he asked to leave the club for personal reasons. Two days later, Argyle replaced Crewe Alexandra at the bottom of the league table after a 1–0 home defeat. Shaun Miller scored the winning goal for Crewe just before half time. Argyle were eliminated from the Football League Trophy in the first round by Exeter City after losing a penalty shoot-out. The match ended in a 1–1 draw, with a goal from Daley cancelling out James Dunne's effort for Exeter, before the home side won 3–0 in the shoot-out. Defender Simon King and midfielder Jamie Griffiths joined the club on loan for one month from Gillingham and Ipswich Town respectively. Richards was loaned out to Barnstaple Town for a month.

=== September ===
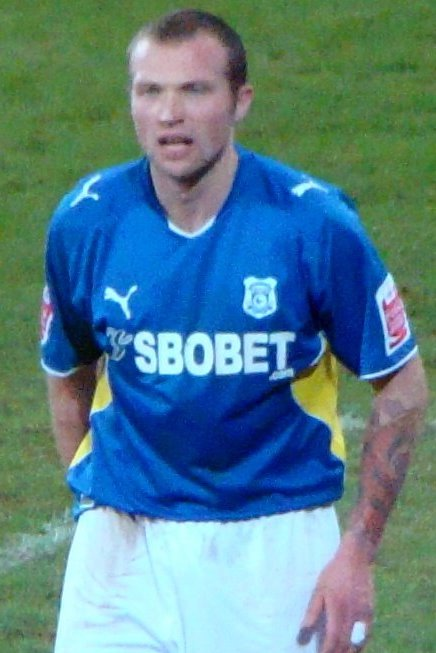
Warren Feeney joined the club on a free transfer from Oldham Athletic.

Having threatened to strike in protest about money owed to staff days beforehand, Argyle lost 2–1 at Burton Albion on 3 September. Justin Richards and Calvin Zola gave Burton a two-goal lead before Atkinson's injury-time consolation. A brace from Gary Roberts consigned Argyle to a sixth consecutive defeat as Port Vale won 2–0 at Home Park. Both sides finished the match with ten men after Marc Richards and Soukouna were sent off. The club's losing streak was extended at Barnet after a 2–0 defeat at Underhill Stadium on 13 September. Izale McLeod and Daniel Leach scored either side of half time for Barnet. The club lost again four days later at Southend United. Fletcher was sent off in the 2–0 defeat and two former players scored Southend's goals – Liam Dickinson and Peter Gilbert. The next day, manager Peter Reid was relieved of his duties after 15 months in charge. The next day, Carl Fletcher was appointed as caretaker manager with Romain Larrieu as his assistant.

The loan deals of Simon King and Jamie Richards were extended until 7 November and 1 December respectively. A first victory of the campaign was secured on 24 September against Macclesfield Town. Warren Feeney and Robbie Williams scored either side of half time to give Argyle a 2–0 win at Home Park.

=== October ===
October began with a 2–0 defeat at Crawley Town. Striker Matt Tubbs scored both goals for the home side. Jamie Griffiths' loan from Ipswich Town was extended for a further month. The team threw away a two-goal lead to draw 2–2 with ten-man Accrington Stanley on 8 October. Simon Walton and Ladjie Soukouna scored before half-time after Sean Hessey was sent-off. Despite that, Accrington came back to earn a point thanks to goals from Kevin Long and Pádraig Amond. Argyle claimed their first away win of the season a week later at Dagenham & Redbridge. Matt Lecointe and Conor Hourihane gave the club a two-goal lead before Scott Doe and Jon Nurse scored for Dagenham. Simon Walton converted a stoppage time penalty to give Argyle a 3–2 victory. A late goal from Raffaele De Vita gave Swindon Town a 1–0 win at Home Park on 22 October. A 5–1 defeat at Oxford United three days later was their eleventh of the season. Robert Hall and James Constable both scored twice, with Peter Leven scoring Oxford's third. Argyle were briefly level in the second half after Simon Walton converted a penalty. Jamie Griffiths was sent off as Argyle lost 2–1 at Cheltenham Town on 29 October. An effort on goal by Jared Sims was turned in by Cheltenham defender Steve Elliott and Argyle retained the lead for an hour before Darryl Duffy scored from the penalty spot. Griffiths was sent off two minutes later and then Duffy scored the winner in stoppage time.

=== November ===
Having guided Argyle to two wins and a draw since the departure of Peter Reid, new owner James Brent appointed Carl Fletcher as the club's player-manager on a full-time basis. Defender Ben Gibson's loan from Middlesbrough was extended until 29 January. Blackpool defender Paul Bignot joined the club on loan for three months on 4 November. An injury-time equaliser from Nick Fenton denied Argyle their third league win of the season as they drew 1–1 with Morecambe. Simon Walton gave the home side the lead in the first half and looked like picking up three much-needed points before Fenton's equaliser in the 94th minute. The club were held to a 3–3 draw by Stourbridge of the Southern League Premier Division in the first round of the FA Cup. Warren Feeney gave Argyle an early lead before Aaron Drake and Ryan Rowe scored either side of half-time for the visitors. Carl Fletcher equalised for Argyle, who then conceded a penalty and had Robbie Williams sent-off. Sean Geddes converted the penalty before a goal from Onismor Bhasera meant a replay was required. Argyle were reduced to nine-men in stoppage time when Connor Hourihane was sent-off for two bookable offences. Striker Craig Sutherland became the second Blackpool player to join the club in November when he signed a two-month loan deal.

French player Maxime Blanchard joined the club on a short-term contract having impressed manager Carl Fletcher while on trial. A brace from Eunan O'Kane helped Torquay United defeat Argyle 3–1 and claim their first league win against them since 1972. After a goalless first half, O'Kane scored twice in quick succession and Danny Stevens gave them a three-goal lead. Will Atkinson's third of the season for Argyle was merely a consolation. Three days later, Argyle lost their FA Cup first round play at Stourbridge. Paul Bignot was sent off in the first half while the game was goalless for kicking Sean Evans. The home side made their numerical advantage count after the break, with Paul McCone and Evans making it 2–0 to the Southern League side. Millwall defender Darren Purse was the first of three players to join the club on loan on 24 November. Former Argyle forward Nick Chadwick arrived from Stockport County, along with Wolverhampton Wanderers player Ashley Hemmings. Argyle moved within three points of safety after defeating Northampton Town 4–1 at Home Park. A Simon Walton gave them the lead and a minute later Nick Chadwick scored his 11th goal for the club. Will Atkinson made it 3–0 and fellow debutant Ashley Hemmings scored a fourth before half-time. Northampton scored a late consolation through Adebayo Akinfenwa.

=== December ===
Argyle resumed their league campaign on 10 December after a two-week break, having failed to reach the second round of the FA Cup. The team gained a point at Bradford City after a 1–1 draw to move above Dagenham & Redbridge at the bottom of the table. Simon Walton scored his sixth goal of the season after 59 minutes before Bradford equalised thanks to James Hanson late in the game. Onismor Bhasera was sent off in stoppage time for a second bookable offence. Argyle were held to a 1–1 draw by Hereford United on 17 December. Thomas Barkhuizen gave the visitors the lead midway through the second-half before Nick Chadwick equalised from the penalty spot after 81 minutes. Both sides finished the game with ten-men after Hereford's Michael Townsend received a second yellow card and Argyle's Darren Purse was given a straight red card. The team came from two goals behind to win 3–2 at Bristol Rovers on Boxing Day. The home side went ahead when Matt Harrold converted a penalty, and he added a second two minutes later before Warren Feeney scored for Argyle. Nick Chadwick's third goal in four games brought the scores level and Ashley Hemmings scored the decisive goal in the 93rd minute. A penalty save from Jake Cole earned Argyle a point in a 0–0 draw at Aldershot Town which lifted the club off the foot of the table as the year came to a close.

=== January ===
On the 2nd, Argyle hosted local Devon rivals Torquay United in front of 12,836 at Home Park, which at the time was the highest League Two attendance of the season. The Gulls scored two second half goals through Billy Bodin and Lee Mansell, meaning that Luke Young's first Argyle goal was nothing but a consolation in a 2–1 defeat. With the January transfer window now open, Argyle confirmed the permanent signings of Nick Chadwick and Darren Purse, who had previously only been on loan from Stockport County and Millwall respectively, as well as signing former youth goalkeeper Ollie Chenoweth from Bideford. Crewe Alexandra won all three points when Argyle travelled to Gresty Road, a brace from Luke Murphy and a penalty scored by Ashley Westwood meant that Simon Walton's penalty and Matt Lecointe's second goal of the season were once again, nothing but consolations. Conor Hourihane was sent off late on in the game for two bookable offences, which was Argyle's tenth and final red card of the season, whilst first team coach Kevin Nancekivell was sent to the stands.

Will Atkinson's loan from Hull City expired, so Argyle extended Ashley Hemmings' loan deal from Wolves and the contract of Maxime Blanchard until the end of the season, along with signing former Argyle captain Paul Wotton on a free transfer from Yeovil Town, and young winger Joe Lennox from Bristol City. Argyle played two home games in a row, the first seeing the team's first win of 2012, with a 2–1 win over Burton Albion, where two goals from Simon Walton either side of a goal from Calvin Zola sealed the points. The second game saw Argyle rescue a late point thanks to Maxime Blanchard's first goal in English football, the goal lifted Argyle out of the bottom two with the French defender scoring an overhead kick to cancel out Pablo Mills' first half stoppage time goal for high flying Crawley Town. The last game of the month saw the Greens travel to Port Vale's Vale Park, where an 86th minute Tom Pope goal saw the hosts win 1–0. Youth goalkeeper Ollie Chenoweth left to join Truro City on loan, whilst striker Rory Patterson returned from his loan at Linfield and was immediately released. On the transfer deadline day, strikers Juvhel Tsoumou and Alex MacDonald joined on loan deals from Preston North End and Burnley respectively.

=== February ===
The first game of February was the only League Two game to go ahead that weekend, with adverse weather affecting the majority of the country. Former Argyle manager Paul Sturrock's Southend United were visitors to Home Park, and went 2–0 up in the first half through Michael Timlin and Dave Martin. Argyle's resurgent attitude however saw them pull level late on, with goals from Nick Chadwick and debutant Alex MacDonald denying Southend from going top of the table. A series of 0–0 draws at home to Barnet and Dag & Red surrounded Argyle's biggest win of the season, a 4–0 triumph away to Accrington Stanley in which Alex MacDonald's first half brace was added to by Darren Purse and Paul Bignot. Argyle travelled to Macclesfield Town's Moss Rose looking to go the whole of February unbeaten, but were disappointed when Conor Hourihane's 71st-minute goal was cancelled out by former Pilgrim Georgie Donnelly in the 95th minute.

=== March ===
Postponements through the winter saw a fixture packed March in which Argyle played seven games. Gillingham came to Home Park for the first of the seven games, with Joe Martin giving them a 23rd-minute lead, before being sent off for a second bookable offence just eight minutes later. Argyle pushed the 10 men of Gillingham for the next hour but failed to score, losing 1–0. Three days later, Argyle had better fortunes on the road, beating AFC Wimbledon 2–1 with goals from Onismor Bhasera, just 12 seconds into the game, and Nick Chadwick either side of a Jack Midson goal for the Dons. A visit to the Don Valley Stadium was next, where a penalty given away by Darren Purse saw Lewis Grabban score to earn Rotherham United all three points. The next week, the pendulum swung once again, with Paul Wotton scoring his first goal since returning to Argyle in a 1–0 win over Shrewsbury Town, lifting the Greens out of the bottom two once again. Next up was the visit of Bristol Rovers, who took a first half lead through Matt Harrold, only for Maxime Blanchard to equalise late on for the hosts, which saw Argyle rise to 21st position in the table. Argyle completed the loan signing of Steve Fletcher from AFC Bournemouth, who sat out Argyle's 0–0 draw away to Northampton Town, before making his debut as a substitute in a 1–0 win at home to Bradford City, where Juvhel Tsoumou's goal saw Argyle claim the three points, to sit on forty points for the season.

=== April ===
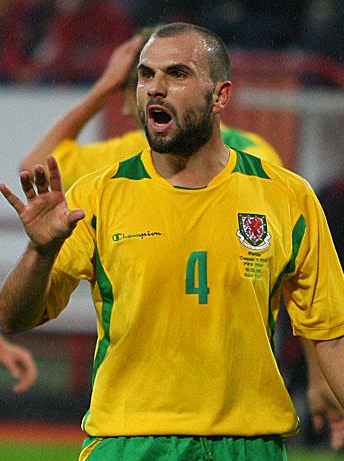
Manager Carl Fletcher guided Argyle to Football League survival

Argyle's form had significantly improved compared to fellow relegation battlers Hereford United, who Argyle travelled to on the 6th of April. An own goal from Dutch defender Stefan Stam gave Argyle the lead, but the Greens failed to extend their lead after a missed penalty from Simon Walton and the inevitable happened when Hereford's Tom Barkhuizen equalised in the second half. An injury to goalkeeper Jake Cole saw Romain Larrieu start and saw Ollie Chenoweth recalled from his loan at Truro City to sit on the bench in a 1–0 win at home to Aldershot Town; Alex MacDonald the goalscorer. A visit to historical rivals Swindon Town was next, and despite losing 1–0 through an 84th minute Alan Connell goal, results elsewhere meant that Argyle were nearly safe from relegation, with seven points separating them from the bottom two and with three games left to play.

It was in Argyle's very next game in which they secured their Football League survival, a 1–1 draw with Oxford United at Home Park. Robbie Williams' free kick had given Argyle the lead, before Asa Hall equalised for the visitors. Macclesfield's and Hereford's results elsewhere meant that Argyle were safe. With league survival now secured, Argyle travelled to Morecambe and gave a debut to goalkeeper Ollie Chenoweth. Luke Young's fourth-minute goal was cancelled out by Jordan Burrow and Lewis Alessandra, before captain-for-the-day Darren Purse headed home a late equaliser for Argyle.

=== May ===
Argyle played their final game of the season at home to Cheltenham Town, who had already secured a play-off spot. Former Argyle striker Steven MacLean gave the visitors the lead with a deflected free kick, before Juvhel Tsoumou equalised in the second half and the Robins then instantly took the lead again through Marlon Pack. With the score at 2–1 and neither side having anything to play for, manager Carl Fletcher substituted soon-to-retire goalkeeper Romain Larrieu on for Jake Cole in the 85th minute. Argyle finished the season with 46 points and in 21st place, ahead of Barnet on goal difference.

== Match results ==
=== Football League Two ===
6 August 2011 Match 1	Shrewsbury Town	1–1	Plymouth Argyle	Shrewsbury, Shropshire
15:00 BST	Collins 69'		Fletcher 90'	Stadium: New Meadow; Attendance: 6,421; Referee: Geoff Eltringham

13 August 2011 Match 2	Plymouth Argyle	1–4	Rotherham United	Plymouth, Devon
15:00 BST	Atkinson 49'		Evans 52', 59'; Le Fondre 82', 87'	Stadium: Home Park; Attendance: 6,015; Referee: Darren Sheldrake

16 August 2011 Match 3	Plymouth Argyle	0–2	AFC Wimbledon	Plymouth, Devon
19:45 BST			Midson 54', 60'	Stadium: Home Park; Attendance: 5,900; Referee: Mark Heywood

20 August 2011 Match 4	Gillingham	3–0	Plymouth Argyle	Gillingham, Kent
15:00 BST	Kedwell 74' (pen.), 90+4' (pen.); Rooney 86'			Stadium: Priestfield Stadium; Attendance: 5,053; Referee: Rob Lewis

27 August 2011 Match 5	Plymouth Argyle	0–1	Crewe Alexandra	Plymouth, Devon
15:00 BST			Miller 42'	Stadium: Home Park; Attendance: 5,720; Referee: Lee Collins

3 September 2011 Match 6	Burton Albion	2–1	Plymouth Argyle	Burton upon Trent, Staffordshire
15:00 BST	Richards 45+2'; Zola 57'		Atkinson 90+1'	Stadium: Pirelli Stadium; Attendance: 3,042; Referee: Andrew Madley

10 September 2011 Match 7	Plymouth Argyle	0–2	Port Vale	Plymouth, Devon
15:00 BST			Roberts 26', 84' (pen.)	Stadium: Home Park; Attendance: 5,018; Referee: Craig Pawson

13 September 2011 Match 8	Barnet	2–0	Plymouth Argyle	Barnet, Greater London
19:45 BST	McLeod 7'; Leach 64'			Stadium: Underhill Stadium; Attendance: 1,849; Referee: Mark Brown

17 September 2011 Match 9	Southend United	2–0	Plymouth Argyle	Southend-on-Sea, Essex
15:00 BST	Dickinson 64' (pen.); Gilbert 80'			Stadium: Roots Hall; Attendance: 4,984; Referee: Michael Naylor

24 September 2011 Match 10	Plymouth Argyle	2–0	Macclesfield Town	Plymouth, Devon
15:00 BST	Feeney 20'; Williams 53'			Stadium: Home Park; Attendance: 6,005; Referee: Roger East

1 October 2011 Match 11	Crawley Town	2–0	Plymouth Argyle	Crawley, West Sussex
15:00 BST	Tubbs 5', 61'			Stadium: Broadfield Stadium; Attendance: 3,175; Referee: Gary Sutton

8 October 2011 Match 12	Plymouth Argyle	2–2	Accrington Stanley	Plymouth, Devon
15:00 BST	Walton 27' (pen.); Soukouna 45+3'		Long 56'; Amond 67'	Stadium: Home Park; Attendance: 8,013; Referee: David Coote

15 October 2011 Match 13	Dagenham & Redbridge	2–3	Plymouth Argyle	Dagenham, Greater London
15:00 BST	Doe 58'; Nurse 68'		Lecointe 20'; Hourihane 52'; Walton 90+3' (pen.)	Stadium: Victoria Road; Attendance: 2,025; Referee: Chris Sarginson

22 October 2011 Match 14	Plymouth Argyle	0–1	Swindon Town	Plymouth, Devon
15:00 BST			De Vita 82'	Stadium: Home Park; Attendance: 6,872; Referee: Andy Woolmer

25 October 2011 Match 15	Oxford United	5–1	Plymouth Argyle	Oxford, Oxfordshire
19:45 BST	Hall 15', 67'; Constable 71', 90+3'; Leven 77'		Walton 55' (pen.)	Stadium: Kassam Stadium; Attendance: 7,802; Referee: Phil Gibbs

29 October 2011 Match 16	Cheltenham Town	2–1	Plymouth Argyle	Cheltenham, Gloucestershire
15:00 BST	Duffy 83', 90+3'		Elliott 26' (o.g.)	Stadium: Whaddon Road; Attendance: 4,026; Referee: Jon Moss

5 November 2011 Match 17	Plymouth Argyle	1–1	Morecambe	Plymouth, Devon
15:00 GMT	Walton 31'		Fenton 90+4'	Stadium: Home Park; Attendance: 5,409; Referee: Fred Graham

19 November 2011 Match 18	Torquay United	3–1	Plymouth Argyle	Torquay, Devon
15:00 GMT	O'Kane 47', 49'; Stevens 69'		Atkinson 78'	Stadium: Plainmoor; Attendance: 3,983; Referee: Jock Waugh

26 November 2011 Match 19	Plymouth Argyle	4–1	Northampton Town	Plymouth, Devon
15:00 GMT	Walton 8' (pen.); Chadwick 9'; Atkinson 17'; Hemmings 44'		Akinfenwa 90+3'	Stadium: Home Park; Attendance: 5,762; Referee: Oliver Langford

10 December 2011 Match 20	Bradford City	1–1	Plymouth Argyle	Bradford, West Yorkshire
15:00 GMT	Hanson 86'		Walton 59'	Stadium: Valley Parade; Attendance: 10,143; Referee: Brendan Malone

17 December 2011 Match 21	Plymouth Argyle	1–1	Hereford United	Plymouth, Devon
15:00 GMT	Chadwick 81' (pen.)		Barkhuizen 67'	Stadium: Home Park; Attendance: 6,531; Referee: James Linington

26 December 2011 Match 22	Bristol Rovers	2–3	Plymouth Argyle	Bristol, City of Bristol
12:00 GMT	Harrold 30' (pen.), 32'		Feeney 52'; Chadwick 79'; Hemmings 90+3'	Stadium: Memorial Stadium; Attendance: 8,090; Referee: Roger East

31 December 2011 Match 23	Aldershot Town	0–0	Plymouth Argyle	Aldershot, Hampshire
13:00 GMT				Stadium: Recreation Ground; Attendance: 3,886; Referee: David Coote

2 January 2012 Match 24	Plymouth Argyle	1–2	Torquay United	Plymouth, Devon
15:00 GMT	Young 72'		Bodin 58'; Mansell 64'	Stadium: Home Park; Attendance: 12,836; Referee: Anthony Bates

7 January 2012 Match 25	Crewe Alexandra	3–2	Plymouth Argyle	Crewe, Cheshire
15:00 GMT	Murphy 20', 44'; Westwood 53' (pen.)		Walton 50' (pen.); Lecointe 66'	Stadium: Alexandra Stadium; Attendance: 3,707; Referee: Andrew Madley

14 January 2012 Match 26	Plymouth Argyle	2–1	Burton Albion	Plymouth, Devon
15:00 GMT	Walton 47', 89' (pen.)		Zola 73'	Stadium: Home Park; Attendance: 6,082; Referee: James Adcock

21 January 2012 Match 27	Plymouth Argyle	1–1	Crawley Town	Plymouth, Devon
15:00 GMT	Blanchard 90'		Mills 45+1'	Stadium: Home Park; Attendance: 6,417; Referee: Phil Gibbs

28 January 2012 Match 28	Port Vale	1–0	Plymouth Argyle	Stoke-on-Trent, Staffordshire
15:00 GMT	Pope 86'			Stadium: Vale Park; Attendance: 4,375; Referee: Iain Williamson

4 February 2012 Match 29	Plymouth Argyle	2–2	Southend United	Plymouth, Devon
15:00 GMT	Chadwick 86'; MacDonald 88'		Timlin 1'; Martin 34'	Stadium: Home Park; Attendance: 6,328; Referee: Chris Sarginson

14 February 2012 Match 30	Plymouth Argyle	0–0	Barnet	Plymouth, Devon
19:45 GMT				Stadium: Home Park; Attendance: 5,879; Referee: Brendan Malone

18 February 2012 Match 31	Accrington Stanley	0–4	Plymouth Argyle	Accrington, Lancashire
15:00 GMT			MacDonald 3', 25'; Purse 72'; Daley 90+1'	Stadium: Crown Ground; Attendance: 2,186; Referee: Mark Heywood

25 February 2012 Match 32	Plymouth Argyle	0–0	Dagenham & Redbridge	Plymouth, Devon
15:00 GMT				Stadium: Home Park; Attendance: 7,804; Referee: Dean Whitestone

28 February 2012 Match 33	Macclesfield Town	1–1	Plymouth Argyle	Macclesfield, Cheshire
19:45 GMT	Donnelly 90+6'		Hourihane 71'	Stadium: Moss Rose; Attendance: 1,888; Referee: Andy Haines

3 March 2012 Match 34	Plymouth Argyle	0–1	Gillingham	Plymouth, Devon
15:00 GMT			Martin 23'	Stadium: Home Park; Attendance: 6,382; Referee: Mark Brown

6 March 2012 Match 35	AFC Wimbledon	1–2	Plymouth Argyle	Kingston upon Thames, Greater London
19:45 GMT	Midson 41'		Bhasera 1'; Chadwick 49'	Stadium: Kingsmeadow; Attendance: 4,578; Referee: Danny McDermid

10 March 2012 Match 36	Rotherham United	1–0	Plymouth Argyle	Sheffield, South Yorkshire
15:00 GMT	Grabban 70' (pen.)			Stadium: Don Valley Stadium; Attendance: 3,475; Referee: Carl Berry

17 March 2012 Match 37	Plymouth Argyle	1–0	Shrewsbury Town	Plymouth, Devon
15:00 GMT	Wotton 21'			Stadium: Home Park; Attendance: 5,931; Referee: Jock Waugh

20 March 2012 Match 38	Plymouth Argyle	1–1	Bristol Rovers	Plymouth, Devon
19:45 GMT	Blanchard 84'		Harrold 14'	Stadium: Home Park; Attendance: 7,531; Referee: Mark Haywood

24 March 2012 Match 39	Northampton Town	0–0	Plymouth Argyle	Northampton, Northamptonshire
15:00 GMT				Stadium: Sixfields Stadium; Attendance: 6,718; Referee: David Phillips

31 March 2012 Match 40	Plymouth Argyle	1–0	Bradford City	Plymouth, Devon
15:00 BST	Tsoumou 4'			Stadium: Home Park; Attendance: 6,933; Referee: Andy D'Urso

6 April 2012 Match 41	Hereford United	1–1	Plymouth Argyle	Hereford, Herefordshire
15:00 BST	Barkhuizen 52'		Stam 30' (o.g.)	Stadium: Edgar Street; Attendance: 4,597; Referee: Oliver Langford

9 April 2012 Match 42	Plymouth Argyle	1–0	Aldershot Town	Plymouth, Devon
15:00 BST	MacDonald 14'			Stadium: Home Park; Attendance: 8,677; Referee: James Linington

14 April 2012 Match 43	Swindon Town	1–0	Plymouth Argyle	Swindon, Wiltshire
15:00 BST	Connell 84'			Stadium: County Ground; Attendance: 10,422; Referee: Scott Mathieson

21 April 2012 Match 44	Plymouth Argyle	1–1	Oxford United	Plymouth, Devon
15:00 BST	Williams 2'		Hall 36'	Stadium: Home Park; Attendance: 8,668; Referee: Gary Sutton

28 April 2012 Match 45	Morecambe	2–2	Plymouth Argyle	Morecambe, Lancashire
15:00 BST	Burrow 51'; Alessandra 70'		Young 4'; Purse 83'	Stadium: Globe Arena; Attendance: 2,313; Referee: Trevor Kettle

5 May 2012 Match 46	Plymouth Argyle	1–2	Cheltenham Town	Plymouth, Devon
15:00 BST	Tsoumou 54'		MacLean 23'; Pack 55'	Stadium: Home Park; Attendance: 8,342; Referee: Phil Gibbs

=== FA Cup ===
12 November 2011 First round	Plymouth Argyle	3–3	Stourbridge	Plymouth, Devon
15:00 GMT	Feeney 4'; Fletcher 70'; Bhasera 88'		Drake 37'; Rowe 53'; Geddes 82' (pen.)	Stadium: Home Park; Attendance: 6,173; Referee: Simon Hooper

22 November 2011 Replay	Stourbridge	2–0	Plymouth Argyle	Stourbridge, West Midlands
19:15 GMT	McCone 52'; Evans 73'			Stadium: War Memorial Athletic Ground; Attendance: 2,519; Referee: Scott Mathieson

=== Football League Cup ===
9 August 2011 First round	Plymouth Argyle	0–1	Millwall	Plymouth, Devon
19:45 BST			N'Guessan 14'	Stadium: Home Park; Attendance: 4,781; Referee: Keith Stroud

=== Football League Trophy ===
30 August 2011 First round	Exeter City	1–1 (3–0 p)	Plymouth Argyle	Exeter, Devon
19:45 BST	Dunne 42'		Daley 60'	Stadium: St James Park; Attendance: 3,940; Referee: Kevin Wright
	Penalties
	Nardiello (penalty scored); Noble (penalty scored); Shephard (penalty missed); Dunne (penalty scored)		(penalty missed) Williams; (penalty missed) Fletcher; (penalty missed) Hitchcock

== League table ==
Pos	Team	Pld	W	D	L	GF	GA	GD	Pts	Promotion, qualification or relegation
19	Dagenham & Redbridge	46	14	8	24	50	72	−22	50	
20	Northampton Town	46	12	12	22	56	79	−23	48	
21	Plymouth Argyle	46	10	16	20	47	64	−17	46	
22	Barnet	46	12	10	24	52	79	−27	46	
23	Hereford United (R)	46	10	14	22	50	70	−20	44	Relegation to the Conference Premier

Updated to match(es) played on 5 May 2012. Source: BBC Sport
Rules for classification: 1) Points; 2) Goal difference; 3) Number of goals scored
(R) Relegated

== Player details ==
No.	Pos.	Name	League		FA Cup		League Cup		Other		Total		Discipline	
No.	Pos.	Name	Apps	Goals	Apps	Goals	Apps	Goals	Apps	Goals	Apps	Goals	Yellow card	Red card
1	GK	Romain Larrieu	10	0	1	0	0	0	1	0	12	0	1	0
2	DF	Durrell Berry	35	0	1	0	0	0	0	0	36	0	8	0
3	DF	Robbie Williams	27	2	1	0	1	0	1	0	30	2	5	1
4	MF	Carl Fletcher	9	1	2	1	0	0	1	0	12	2	5	1
5	DF	Simon King	6	0	0	0	0	0	0	0	6	0	2	0
5	DF	Darren Purse	24	2	0	0	0	0	0	0	24	2	2	1
5	DF	Stéphane Zubar	4	0	0	0	1	0	0	0	5	0	2	0
6	DF	Curtis Nelson	17	0	2	0	1	0	1	0	21	0	2	0
7	MF	Luke Daley	18	1	1	0	1	0	1	1	21	2	0	0
8	MF	Simon Walton	41	9	2	0	1	0	1	0	45	9	7	0
9	FW	Juvhel Tsoumou	11	2	0	0	0	0	0	0	11	2	2	0
10	FW	Steve Fletcher	6	0	0	0	0	0	0	0	6	0	0	0
10	FW	Tom Hitchcock	8	0	0	0	1	0	1	0	10	0	2	0
10	FW	Craig Sutherland	9	0	0	0	0	0	0	0	9	0	0	0
11	FW	Warren Feeney	28	2	2	1	0	0	0	0	30	3	5	0
13	DF	Ladjie Soukouna	20	1	0	0	1	0	1	0	22	1	4	1
14	DF	Onismor Bhasera	27	1	2	1	0	0	0	0	29	2	6	1
15	MF	Luke Young	28	2	0	0	0	0	0	0	28	2	1	0
17	FW	Jared Sims	3	0	0	0	1	0	0	0	4	0	0	0
18	MF	Jordan Copp	0	0	0	0	1	0	0	0	1	0	0	0
19	DF	Ben Gibson	13	0	1	0	1	0	1	0	16	0	5	1
19	MF	Paul Wotton	18	1	0	0	0	0	0	0	18	1	4	0
20	MF	Conor Hourihane	38	2	2	0	1	0	1	0	42	2	9	2
21	MF	Will Atkinson	22	4	2	0	0	0	1	0	25	4	6	0
21	MF	Joe Lennox	8	0	0	0	0	0	0	0	8	0	0	0
22	DF	Maxime Blanchard	28	2	0	0	0	0	0	0	28	2	5	0
22	MF	Jamie Griffiths	9	0	0	0	0	0	0	0	9	0	0	1
23	GK	Jake Cole	37	0	1	0	1	0	0	0	39	0	0	0
24	FW	Isaac Vassell	6	0	2	0	0	0	0	0	8	0	0	0
27	FW	Matt Lecointe	19	2	2	0	1	0	0	0	22	2	0	0
28	DF	Paul Bignot	14	0	2	0	0	0	0	0	16	0	1	1
29	FW	Nick Chadwick	22	5	0	0	0	0	0	0	22	5	4	0
31	MF	Ashley Hemmings	23	2	0	0	0	0	0	0	23	2	1	0
32	FW	Alex MacDonald	18	4	0	0	0	0	0	0	18	4	4	0
33	GK	Ollie Chenoweth	1	0	0	0	0	0	0	0	1	0	0	0

Updated to game played on 5 May 2012
Source: Soccerbase
No. = Squad number; Pos. = Playing position; Apps = Appearances made.

== Transfers ==
=== In ===
Date	Pos.	Name	From	Fee
4 July 2011	DF	Durrell Berry	Aston Villa	Free transfer
4 July 2011	DF	Robbie Williams	Rochdale	Free transfer
5 July 2011	FW	Liam Dickinson	Barnsley	Free transfer
19 July 2011	MF	Luke Daley	Norwich City	Free transfer
19 July 2011	DF	Ladjie Soukouna	Créteil	Free transfer
20 July 2011	GK	Jake Cole	Barnet	Free transfer
30 July 2011	MF	Conor Hourihane	Ipswich Town	Free transfer
4 August 2011	FW	Warren Feeney	Oldham Athletic	Free transfer
18 November 2011	DF	Maxime Blanchard	Tranmere Rovers	Free transfer
4 January 2012	FW	Nick Chadwick	Stockport County	Free transfer
5 January 2012	DF	Darren Purse	Millwall	Free transfer
12 January 2012	MF	Paul Wotton	Yeovil Town	Free transfer
12 January 2012	MF	Joe Lennox	Bristol City	Free transfer

=== Out ===
Date	Pos.	Name	To	Fee
6 June 2011	MF	Yannick Bolasie	Bristol City	Undisclosed
24 June 2011	MF	Kári Árnason	Aberdeen	Released
1 July 2011	MF	Chris Clark	Aberdeen	Released
1 July 2011	DF	Karl Duguid	Colchester United	Released
1 July 2011	FW	Rory Fallon	Yeovil Town	Released
1 July 2011	DF	Ryan Leonard	Southend United	Released
1 July 2011	FW	Steve MacLean	Yeovil Town	Released
1 July 2011	MF	Jim Paterson	Shamrock Rovers	Released
1 July 2011	MF	Anton Peterlin	Walsall	Released
1 July 2011	FW	Matt Rickard	Michigan Wolverines	Released
1 July 2011	DF	Marcel Seip	Bradford City	Released
1 July 2011	MF	Luke Summerfield	Cheltenham Town	Released
1 July 2011	DF	Krisztián Timár	SHB Da Nang	Released
4 July 2011	DF	Bondz N'Gala	Yeovil Town	Free transfer
10 July 2011	FW	Joe Mason	Cardiff City	Undisclosed
13 July 2011	FW	Liam Dickinson	Southend United	Released
25 August 2011	DF	Stéphane Zubar	Bournemouth	Released
January 2012	FW	Rory Patterson	Derry City	Undisclosed

=== Loans in ===
Start date	End date	Pos.	Name	From
19 July 2011	19 October 2011	FW	Tom Hitchcock	Blackburn Rovers
2 August 2011	December 2012	DF	Ben Gibson	Middlesbrough
12 August 2011	January 2012	MF	Will Atkinson	Hull City
31 August 2011	7 November 2011	DF	Simon King	Gillingham
31 August 2011	5 November 2011	MF	Jamie Griffiths	Ipswich Town
4 November 2011	4 February 2012	DF	Paul Bignot	Blackpool
16 November 2011	28 January 2012	FW	Craig Sutherland	Blackpool
24 November 2011	January 2012	DF	Darren Purse	Millwall
24 November 2011	January 2012	FW	Nick Chadwick	Stockport County
24 November 2011	June 2012	MF	Ashley Hemmings	Wolverhampton Wanderers
31 January 2012	May 2012	FW	Alex MacDonald	Burnley
31 January 2012	May 2012	FW	Juvhel Tsoumou	Preston North End
22 March 2012	May 2012	FW	Steve Fletcher	Bournemouth

=== Loans out ===
Start date	End date	Pos.	Name	To
16 July 2011	January 2012	FW	Rory Patterson	Linfield
20 July 2011	30 June 2012	MF	Damien Johnson	Huddersfield Town
31 August 2011	1 December 2011	DF	Jamie Richards	Barnstaple Town
28 January 2012	June 2012	GK	Ollie Chenoweth	Truro City
13 March 2012	June 2012	FW	Isaac Vassell	Truro City

== Awards ==
End of Season Awards	Winner
Player of the Season	Maxime Blanchard
Young Player of the Season	Luke Young

== See also ==
- List of Plymouth Argyle F.C. seasons
