= 2012–13 Plymouth Argyle F.C. season =

English football club season

Plymouth Argyle F.C.
2012–13 season
- Chairman: James Brent
- Manager: Carl Fletcher (until 1 January 2013); John Sheridan (from 6 January 2013)
- Stadium: Home Park
- Football League Two: 21st
- FA Cup: First Round (knocked out by Dorchester)
- Football League Cup: Second Round (knocked out by Burnley)
- Football League Trophy: Quarter-Finals (Southern) (knocked out by Oxford)
- Top goalscorer: League: Jason Banton (6); All: Jason Banton (6)
- Highest home attendance: 13,251 vs. Exeter City (30 March 2013)
- Lowest home attendance: League: 5,219 vs. Burton Albion (7 November 2012); All: 2,383 vs. Oxford (4 December 2012)
- Average home league attendance: 7,096
Home colours	Away colours

The 2012–13 season was the 99th season of competitive association football played by Plymouth Argyle Football Club, an English team based in Plymouth. The season was the club's 86th in the Football League and seventh in the fourth tier of the English football league system.

== Match details ==
=== Football League Two ===
18 August 2012 Match 1	Plymouth Argyle	0–2	Aldershot Town	Home Park, Plymouth
15:00 BST			Brown 5'; Payne 54' (pen.)	Attendance: 7,020; Referee: Simon Hooper

21 August 2012 Match 2	Dagenham & Redbridge	0–0	Plymouth Argyle	Victoria Road, Dagenham
19:45 BST				Attendance: 1,878; Referee: Graham Scott

25 August 2012 Match 3	Oxford United	2–1	Plymouth Argyle	Kassam Stadium, Oxford
15:00 BST	Smalley 20', 23'		Williams 74'	Attendance: 6,906; Referee: Stephen Bratt

1 September 2012 Match 4	Plymouth Argyle	3–2	Northampton Town	Home Park, Plymouth
15:00 BST	Feeney 47'; R. Griffiths 59'; Nelson 74'		Nicholls 26'; Artell 90'	Attendance: 6,037; Referee: Andy Davies

8 September 2012 Match 5	Torquay United	0–0	Plymouth Argyle	Plainmoor, Torquay
15:00 BST				Attendance: 4,932; Referee: Roger East

15 September 2012 Match 6	Plymouth Argyle	1–3	Port Vale	Home Park, Plymouth
15:00 BST	Williams 18'		Myrie-Williams 66' (pen.); Vincent 74'; Williamson 78'	Attendance: 6,080; Referee: Darren Sheldrake

18 September 2012 Match 7	Plymouth Argyle	1–1	Bristol Rovers	Home Park, Plymouth
19:45 BST	Hourihane 35'		Parkes 70'	Attendance: 6,303; Referee: Darren Deadman

22 September 2012 Match 8	Morecambe	2–3	Plymouth Argyle	Globe Arena, Morecambe
15:00 BST	Redshaw 4'; Brodie 51' (pen.)		Jenkins 72'; Feeney 80' (pen.), 87' (pen.)	Attendance: 1,865; Referee: Tony Harrington

29 September 2012 Match 9	Plymouth Argyle	1–1	Southend United	Home Park, Plymouth
15:00 BST	MacDonald 50'		Assombalonga 54'	Attendance: 6,269; Referee: Steven Rushton

2 October 2012 Match 10	Wycombe Wanderers	1–1	Plymouth Argyle	Adams Park, High Wycombe
19:45 BST	McClure 12'		Madjo 50'	Attendance: 3,161; Referee: Gavin Ward

6 October 2012 Match 11	Plymouth Argyle	1–2	AFC Wimbledon	Home Park, Plymouth
15:00 BST	R. Griffiths 89'		Harrison 13'; Yussuff 90'	Attendance: 6,271; Referee: Keith Stroud

13 October 2012 Match 12	Barnet	1–4	Plymouth Argyle	Underhill Stadium, Barnet
15:00 BST	Stephens 16'		R. Griffiths 2' (pen.); Blanchard 11'; Cowan-Hall 62'; Young 90'	Attendance: 3,229; Referee: Fred Graham

20 October 2012 Match 13	Plymouth Argyle	3–1	Rochdale	Home Park, Plymouth
15:00 BST	Madjo 4' (pen.), 90' (pen.); Gurrieri 7'		Adebola 76'	Attendance: 6,261; Referee: Gary Sutton

23 October 2012 Match 14	Cheltenham Town	2–1	Plymouth Argyle	Whaddon Road, Cheltenham
19:45 BST	Elliott 37'; Mohamed 78'		Hourihane 30'	Attendance: 3,058; Referee: Stephen Martin

27 October 2012 Match 15	Rotherham United	1–0	Plymouth Argyle	New York Stadium, Rotherham
15:00 BST	Agard 73'			Attendance: 6,938; Referee: Darren Bond

7 November 2012 Match 16	Plymouth Argyle	1–2	Burton Albion	Home Park, Plymouth
19:45 GMT	Cowan-Hall 49'		Stanton 74'; Weir 79'	Attendance: 5,219; Referee: Mick Russell

10 November 2012 Match 17	Plymouth Argyle	2–2	Gillingham	Home Park, Plymouth
15:00 GMT	Nelson 33'; Young 79'		Strevens 38'; Barrett 88'	Attendance: 6,396; Referee: Andy D'Urso

17 November 2012 Match 18	Fleetwood Town	3–0	Plymouth Argyle	Highbury Stadium, Fleetwood
15:00 GMT	Ball 2'; Nelson 83' (o.g.); Brown 90'			Attendance: 2,657; Referee: David Webb

20 November 2012 Match 19	Bradford City	1–0	Plymouth Argyle	Valley Parade, Bradford
19:45 GMT	Jones 21'			Attendance: 8,843; Referee: Anthony Bates

24 November 2012 Match 20	Plymouth Argyle	0–1	Chesterfield	Home Park, Plymouth
15:00 GMT			Richards 66'	Attendance: 5,711; Referee: Graham Scott

8 December 2012 Match 21	Plymouth Argyle	2–0	York City	Home Park, Plymouth
15:00 GMT	Fyfield 45' (o.g.); Chadwick 90'			Attendance: 5,881; Referee: Tim Robinson

15 December 2012 Match 22	Exeter City	1–1	Plymouth Argyle	St James Park, Exeter
12:00 GMT	Sercombe 34'		Lennox 73'	Attendance: 6,447; Referee: Andy Woolmer

22 December 2012 Match 23	Accrington Stanley	1–1	Plymouth Argyle	Crown Ground, Accrington
15:00 GMT	Beattie 52'		Bhasera 27'	Attendance: 2,012; Referee: Mick Russell

26 December 2012 Match 24	Plymouth Argyle	1–1	Torquay United	Home Park, Plymouth
13:00 GMT	Harvey 90'		Downes 78'	Attendance: 10,003; Referee: Graham Salisbury

29 December 2012 Match 25	Plymouth Argyle	0–1	Wycombe Wanderers	Home Park, Plymouth
15:00 GMT			McClure 11'	Attendance: 6,983; Referee: Brendan Malone

1 January 2013 Match 26	Bristol Rovers	2–1	Plymouth Argyle	Memorial Stadium, Bristol
13:00 GMT	Anyinsah 19'; Lund 25'		Hourihane 62'	Attendance: 7,332; Referee: Mark Heywood

5 January 2013 Match 27	Port Vale	4–0	Plymouth Argyle	Vale Park, Stoke-on-Trent
15:00 GMT	Myrie-Williams 32'; Pope 55', 83'; Williamson 77'			Attendance: 5,139; Referee: Scott Mathieson

12 January 2013 Match 28	Plymouth Argyle	2–1	Morecambe	Home Park, Plymouth
15:00 GMT	Hourihane 10'; Cowan-Hall 16'		Williams 80'	Attendance: 6,401; Referee: Tim Robinson

26 January 2013 Match 29	Plymouth Argyle	0–0	Accrington Stanley	Home Park, Plymouth
15:00 GMT				Attendance: 6,509; Referee: Mick Russell

2 February 2013 Match 30	Plymouth Argyle	0–0	Dagenham & Redbridge	Home Park, Plymouth
15:00 GMT				Attendance: 6,234; Referee: Stephen Martin

9 February 2013 Match 31	Aldershot Town	1–2	Plymouth Argyle	Recreation Ground, Aldershot
15:00 GMT	Vincenti 11'		Banton 5', 40'	Attendance: 3,241; Referee: Fred Graham

16 February 2013 Match 32	Plymouth Argyle	0–1	Oxford United	Home Park, Plymouth
15:00 GMT			Constable 16'	Attendance: 7,189; Referee: Chris Sarginson

23 February 2013 Match 33	Northampton Town	1–0	Plymouth Argyle	Sixfields Stadium, Northampton
15:00 GMT	Platt 72'			Attendance: 5,382; Referee: David Phillips

26 February 2013 Match 34	AFC Wimbledon	1–1	Plymouth Argyle	Kingsmeadow, Kingston upon Thames
19:45 GMT	Pell 28'		Banton 26'	Attendance: 4,480; Referee: Tim Robinson

2 March 2013 Match 35	Plymouth Argyle	2–1	Barnet	Home Park, Plymouth
15:00 GMT	Hourihane 36'; Murray 49'		Hyde 21'	Attendance: 8,210; Referee: Dean Whitestone

9 March 2013 Match 36	Gillingham	2–1	Plymouth Argyle	Priestfield Stadium, Gillingham
15:00 GMT	German 31'; Whelpdale 62'		Banton 77'	Attendance: 10,260; Referee: Craig Pawson

12 March 2013 Match 37	Plymouth Argyle	0–0	Bradford City	Home Park, Plymouth
19:45 GMT				Attendance: 5,609; Referee: Andy Davies

16 March 2013 Match 38	Plymouth Argyle	2–1	Fleetwood Town	Home Park, Plymouth
15:00 GMT	Wotton 25' (pen.); Banton 39'		Ball 75'	Attendance: 6,776; Referee: Trevor Kettle

19 March 2013 Match 39	Southend United	0–2	Plymouth Argyle	Roots Hall, Southend-on-Sea
19:45 GMT			Wotton 57' (pen.); Reid 75'	Attendance: 4,674; Referee: James Linington

30 March 2013 Match 40	Plymouth Argyle	1–0	Exeter City	Home Park, Plymouth
13:00 GMT	Banton 45'			Attendance: 13,251; Referee: Darren Drysdale

1 April 2013 Match 41	York City	2–0	Plymouth Argyle	Bootham Crescent, York
15:00 BST	Chambers 20'; Cresswell 29'			Attendance: 4,682; Referee: Tony Harrington

6 April 2013 Match 42	Plymouth Argyle	2–0	Cheltenham Town	Home Park, Plymouth
15:00 BST	Reid 40'; Hector 54' (o.g.)			Attendance: 7,941; Referee: Carl Berry

13 April 2013 Match 43	Burton Albion	1–0	Plymouth Argyle	Pirelli Stadium, Burton upon Trent
15:00 BST	Paterson 90'			Attendance: 4,392; Referee: Keith Hill

16 April 2013 Match 44	Chesterfield	1–2	Plymouth Argyle	Proact Stadium, Chesterfield
19:45 BST	Branston 57' (o.g.)		Bryan 21'; Nelson 26'	Attendance: 4,988; Referee: Nigel Miller

20 April 2013 Match 45	Plymouth Argyle	0–1	Rotherham United	Home Park, Plymouth
15:00 BST			Agard 75'	Attendance: 10,648; Referee: David Coote

27 April 2013 Match 46	Rochdale	1–0	Plymouth Argyle	Spotland Stadium, Rochdale
15:00 BST	Bunney 78'			Attendance: 4,272; Referee: Geoff Eltringham

=== FA Cup ===
4 November 2012 First round	Dorchester Town	1–0	Plymouth Argyle	The Avenue Stadium, Dorchester
16:30 GMT	Gosling 49'			Attendance: 3,196; Referee: Lee Collins

=== Football League Cup ===
14 August 2012 First round	Plymouth Argyle	3–0	Portsmouth	Home Park, Plymouth
19:45 BST	Gorman 45'; Cowan-Hall 86'; Chadwick 87'			Attendance: 5,318; Referee: Brendan Malone

28 August 2012 Second round	Burnley	1–1 (a.e.t.) (3–2 p)	Plymouth Argyle	Turf Moor, Burnley
19:45 BST	Austin 37'		Williams 90' (pen.)	Attendance: 4,119; Referee: Andrew Madley
	Penalties
	Wallace (penalty missed); Vokes (penalty scored); Stanislas (penalty missed); Hewitt (penalty scored); Stock (penalty scored)		Williams (penalty missed); Young (penalty missed); Lecointe (penalty scored); Hourihane (penalty missed); Blanchard (penalty scored)

=== Football League Trophy ===
9 October 2012 Second round (southern area)	Plymouth Argyle	2–1	Aldershot Town	Home Park, Plymouth
19:00 BST	Cowan-Hall 1'; Gurrieri 30'		Reid 12'	Attendance: 2,590; Referee: Dean Whitestone

4 December 2012 Quarter-finals (southern area)	Plymouth Argyle	1–1 (a.e.t.) (1–3 p)	Oxford United	Home Park, Plymouth
19:00 GMT	MacDonald 20'		Constable 62'	Attendance: 2,383; Referee: Roger East
	Penalties
	R. Griffiths (penalty scored); Gurrieri (penalty missed); Lowry (penalty missed); Blanchard (penalty missed)		Rigg (penalty scored); Chapman (penalty scored); Davis (penalty scored)

== Squad statistics ==
Appearances and goals are sourced from Soccerbase. For a description of playing positions, see association football positions.

First team players to have made at least one appearance
Squad number	Name	Position	League		FA Cup		League Cup		FL Trophy		Total	
Squad number	Name	Position	Apps	Goals	Apps	Goals	Apps	Goals	Apps	Goals	Apps	Goals
1	Jake Cole	Goalkeeper	34	0	0	0	2	0	0	0	36	0
2	Durrell Berry	Defender	28	0	1	0	1	0	2	0	32	0
3	Robbie Williams	Defender	15	2	0	0	1	1	0	0	16	3
4	Maxime Blanchard	Defender	40	1	1	0	2	0	1	0	44	1
5	Guy Branston	Defender	19	0	0	0	0	0	0	0	19	0
5	Darren Purse	Defender	21	0	0	0	1	0	0	0	22	0
6	Conor Hourihane	Midfielder	42	5	1	0	2	0	2	0	47	5
7	Paris Cowan-Hall	Forward	40	3	1	0	2	1	2	1	45	5
8	Luke Young	Midfielder	32	2	1	0	2	0	1	0	36	2
9	Nick Chadwick	Forward	28	1	0	0	2	1	2	0	32	2
10	Lee Cox	Midfielder	10	0	0	0	0	0	0	0	10	0
10	Rhys Griffiths	Forward	14	3	1	0	0	0	2	0	17	3
11	Warren Feeney	Forward	21	3	1	0	0	0	0	0	22	3
14	Onismor Bhasera	Defender	42	1	1	0	2	0	1	0	46	1
15	Paul Wotton	Midfielder	19	2	0	0	1	0	0	0	20	2
16	Jamie Lowry	Midfielder	9	0	1	0	0	0	1	0	11	0
17	Curtis Nelson	Defender	27	3	1	0	2	0	2	0	32	3
18	Joe Bryan	Midfielder	10	1	0	0	0	0	0	0	10	1
18	Guy Madjo	Forward	14	3	0	0	0	0	0	0	14	3
18	Gozie Ugwu	Forward	6	0	0	0	0	0	0	0	6	0
19	Jason Banton	Midfielder	14	6	0	0	0	0	0	0	14	6
19	Joe Lennox	Midfielder	11	1	1	0	2	0	1	0	15	1
20	Rene Gilmartin	Goalkeeper	13	0	1	0	0	0	2	0	16	0
21	Matt Lecointe	Forward	6	0	0	0	2	0	0	0	8	0
22	Jared Sims	Forward	0	0	0	0	1	0	1	0	2	0
23	Jamie Richards	Defender	1	0	0	0	0	0	1	0	2	0
24	Reuben Reid	Forward	18	2	0	0	0	0	0	0	18	2
26	Anthony Charles	Defender	11	0	0	0	0	0	0	0	11	0
27	Andres Gurrieri	Midfielder	28	1	1	0	1	0	2	1	32	2
28	Johnny Gorman	Midfielder	2	0	0	0	2	1	0	0	4	1
28	Ronan Murray	Forward	13	1	0	0	0	0	0	0	13	1
29	Tyler Harvey	Forward	10	1	0	0	0	0	1	0	11	1
30	Ross Jenkins	Midfielder	2	1	0	0	0	0	0	0	2	1
30	Mark Molesley	Midfielder	5	0	0	0	0	0	1	0	6	0
32	Alex MacDonald	Forward	16	1	0	0	0	0	1	1	17	2
33	Scott Griffiths	Defender	4	0	1	0	0	0	1	0	6	0

== Transfers ==
=== In ===
Players joining the club
Date	Name	From†	Fee	Ref
1 July 2012	Paris Cowan-Hall	Woking	Undisclosed	
4 July 2012	Rene Gilmartin	(Watford)	Free	
11 July 2012	Jamie Lowry	(Chesterfield)	Free	
3 August 2012	Andres Gurrieri	(Burton Albion)	Free	
6 August 2012	Rhys Griffiths	Port Talbot Town	Free	
11 January 2013	Guy Branston	(Aldershot Town)	Free	
17 January 2013	Anthony Charles	(Northampton Town)	Free	

† Brackets around club names indicate the player's contract with that club had expired before he joined Plymouth Argyle.

=== Out ===
Players leaving the club
Date	Name	To	Fee	Ref
6 July 2012	Simon Walton	Hartlepool United	Free	
31 August 2012	Ladjie Soukouna	Unattached	Released	
31 December 2012	Jordan Copp	Unattached	Released	
31 December 2012	Jed Harper-Penman	Unattached	Released	
4 January 2013	Darren Purse	Unattached	Released	
31 January 2013	Joe Lennox	Unattached	Released	
31 January 2013	Robbie Williams	Unattached	Released	
31 January 2013	Rhys Griffiths	Unattached	Released	

=== Loans in ===
Players joining the club on loan
Date	Name	From	Until	Ref
6 August 2012	Johnny Gorman	Wolverhampton Wanderers	22 September 2012	
31 August 2012	Alex MacDonald	Burnley	4 December 2012	
8 September 2012	Guy Madjo	Aldershot Town	15 December 2012	
21 September 2012	Ross Jenkins	Watford	27 October 2012	
9 October 2012	Scott Griffiths	Peterborough United	20 November 2012	
22 November 2012	Mark Molesley	Bournemouth	1 January 2013	
10 January 2013	Ronan Murray	Ipswich Town	30 June 2013	
17 January 2013	Gozie Ugwu	Reading	11 March 2013	
25 January 2013	Reuben Reid	Yeovil Town	30 June 2013	
31 January 2013	Jason Banton	Crystal Palace	13 April 2013	
8 February 2013	Lee Cox	Swindon Town	30 June 2013	
12 March 2013	Joe Bryan	Bristol City	30 June 2013	

=== Loans out ===
Players leaving the club on loan
Date	Name	To	Until	Ref
4 August 2012	Jed Harper-Penman	Bideford	4 November 2012	
31 August 2012	Isaac Vassell	Bideford	1 December 2012	
2 November 2012	Ollie Chenoweth	Frome Town	2 December 2012	
28 March 2013	Jamie Richards	Weymouth	30 June 2013	

== See also ==
- List of Plymouth Argyle F.C. seasons
