= 2010–11 Plymouth Argyle F.C. season =

English football club season

Plymouth Argyle
2010–11 season
- Chairman: Roy Gardner (until 27 December); James Brent
- Manager: Peter Reid
- Stadium: Home Park
- League One: 23rd (relegated)
- FA Cup: First round (eliminated by Swindon)
- League Cup: First round (eliminated by Notts County)
- League Trophy: Quarter-finals (eliminated by Exeter)
- Top goalscorer: League: Bradley Wright-Phillips (13); All: Bradley Wright-Phillips (13)
- Highest home attendance: 14,347 vs. Exeter City (11 December 2010)
- Lowest home attendance: 4,960 vs. Dagenham & Redbridge (23 November 2010)
- Average home league attendance: League: 8,613
Home colours	Away colours

Plymouth Argyle Football Club is an English association football club based in Plymouth, Devon. The 2010–11 season is their 108th as a professional club, their 86th as a member of the Football League and 39th in the third tier of the English football league system. The club's 23rd-place finish in the 2009–10 Championship season means they are competing in League One for the first time since 2004, when they were promoted as champions. It officially began on 1 July 2010 and ends on 30 June 2011, with competitive fixtures taking place between August and May.

== Background ==
The 2009–10 season was the club's sixth consecutive season back in the second tier of English football, known as the Championship. It was manager Paul Sturrock's third season back at the club after returning to Home Park from Swindon Town. He was replaced by Paul Mariner in December 2009 due to poor results, which had seen the club drop into the relegation zone. Argyle were relegated with two matches still to play after a defeat at home to Newcastle United, which saw the visitors claim the league title. Yoann Folly, David McNamee, and Lloyd Saxton were released after being informed that their contracts weren't being renewed, and defender Gary Sawyer also departed. A statement in May said that the club would seek a new manager and Paul Mariner would revert to his previous role as head coach. Jamie Mackie joined Queens Park Rangers two weeks later for an undisclosed fee. Bondz N'Gala joined the club from West Ham United on a free transfer, and Rory Patterson was signed for an undisclosed fee from Glentoran, before the club confirmed Peter Reid as their new manager in June 2010.

== Review ==
=== Pre-season ===
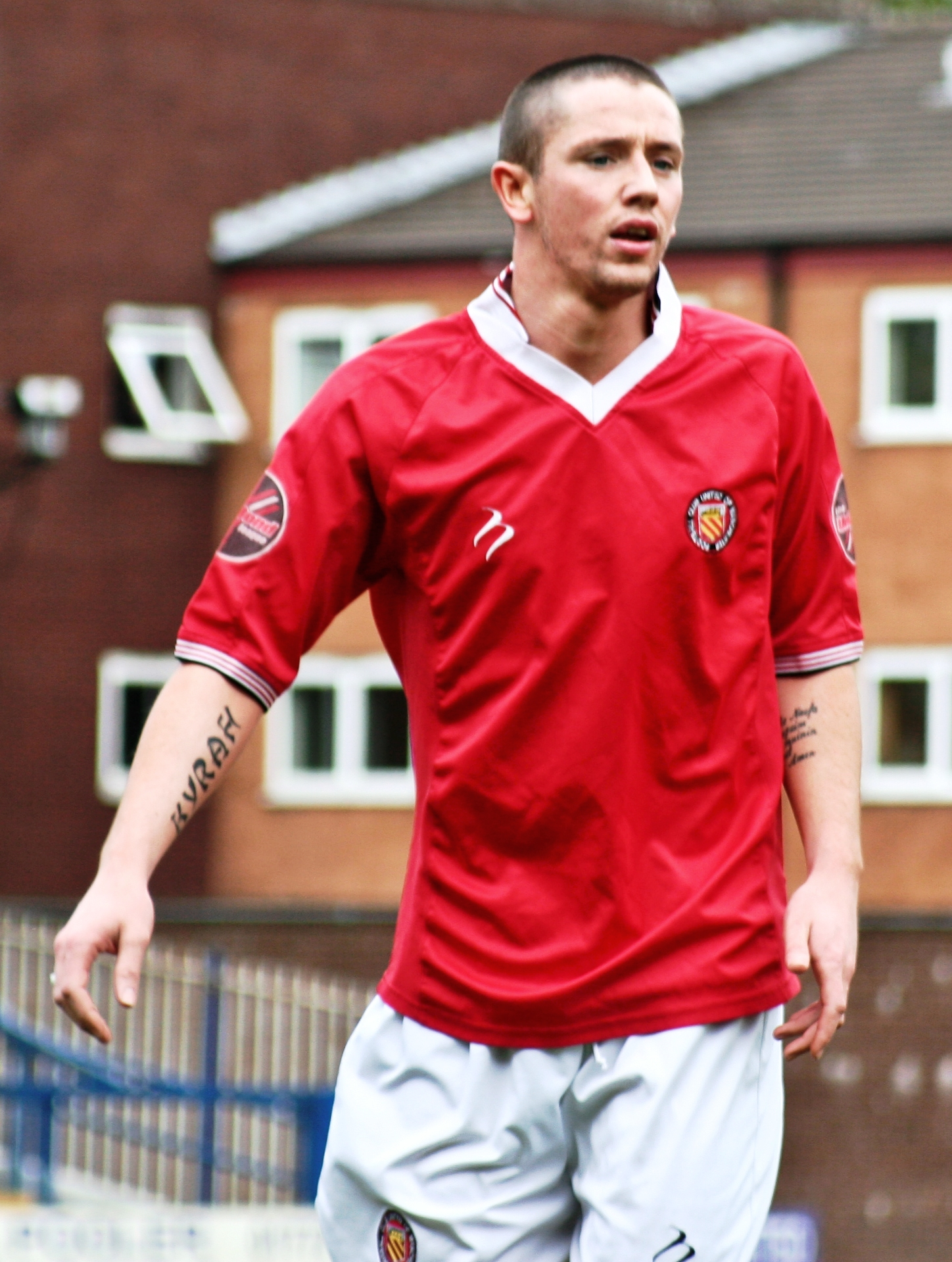
Rory Patterson joined the club in June from Glentoran.

Midfielder Simon Walton joined Sheffield United on a season-long loan. He was followed by Ashley Barnes, who joined Brighton & Hove Albion for an undisclosed fee, and Alan Gow, who was released. The club's first pre-season friendly ended in a 2–0 win at Southern League team Truro City thanks to goals from Yannick Bolasie and Steve MacLean. This was followed by a defeat at League Two club Torquay United. The visitors took an early lead through Craig Noone, but the home side responded with goals from Lloyd Macklin, Elliot Benyon and Nicky Wroe to secure a 3–1 win. Manager Peter Reid then selected a 26-man squad to travel to the Netherlands to play three matches against Dutch opposition. Included in the squad were three trialists, including former player Tony Capaldi. A headed goal from Joe Mason gave Argyle a 1–0 victory against Eredivisie side NAC Breda. They suffered a defeat by the same scoreline against fellow Eredivisie side AZ in their next friendly. An early penalty from Nick van der Velden was the difference between the two sides in a match which saw Steve MacLean sent off in the second half.

Argyle took a three-goal lead against Eerste Divisie club SC Cambuur, but eventually had to settle for a 3–3 draw. A brace from Reza Ghoochannejhad and an equaliser from Robert van Boxel cancelled out Argyle's lead, which was given to them by Craig Noone and a brace from Joe Mason. Having featured in all of the club's pre-season matches, midfielder Anton Peterlin signed a permanent contract. Argyle won their next friendly later that day against Hereford United of League Two. Steve MacLean was on target to secure a 1–0 win for the visitors. Striker George Donnelly returned to Stockport County on a six-month loan. A penalty from Luke Summerfield earned the club a draw against Championship side Queens Park Rangers. Former player Jamie Mackie scored the equaliser for the hosts. Argyle completed their pre-season campaign with an 8–0 win against South West Peninsula League team Saltash United. Strikers Bradley Wright-Phillips and Rory Patterson both scored twice while trialist Owain Tudur-Jones, Craig Noone, Joe Mason and Curtis Nelson also found the back of the net.

=== August ===
Goalkeeper David Button joined the club on a season-long loan from Tottenham Hotspur, and defender Lee Molyneux signed a permanent contract after impressing on trial. Two other players left the club on loan. Defender Chris Barker joined Southend United for one month, and midfielder Damien Johnson signed a season-long deal with Huddersfield Town. The club started the season with a 1–0 win at Southampton. Luke Summerfield scored the winning goal in a match which was broadcast live on Sky Sports. They were knocked out of the League Cup by Notts County three days later. A second half goal from John Spicer eliminated Argyle at the first round stage for the third year in row. Midfielder Dean Parrett arrived on a season-long loan from Tottenham Hotspur. A late goal from Rory Patterson earned the club a share of the points at Home Park against Carlisle United in a 1–1 draw, having fallen behind to an Ian Harte goal. This was followed by a 2–1 defeat at Walsall. Joe Mason gave Argyle the lead, but second half goals from Paul Marshall and former player Reuben Reid won the game for the home side. Kári Árnason was shown a straight red card in stoppage time. Sean Kinsella and Jordan Trott were loaned out to Bridgwater Town for one month. Argyle were defeated 3–0 at home by Peterborough United, who scored three second-half goals thanks to strikers Craig Mackail-Smith, who scored twice, and Aaron McLean. The club completed two transfers before the summer transfer window closed. Defender Stéphane Zubar arrived from Vaslui on a free transfer, and Chris Barker joined Southend United permanently, also on a free transfer, after spending a month with them on loan.

=== September ===
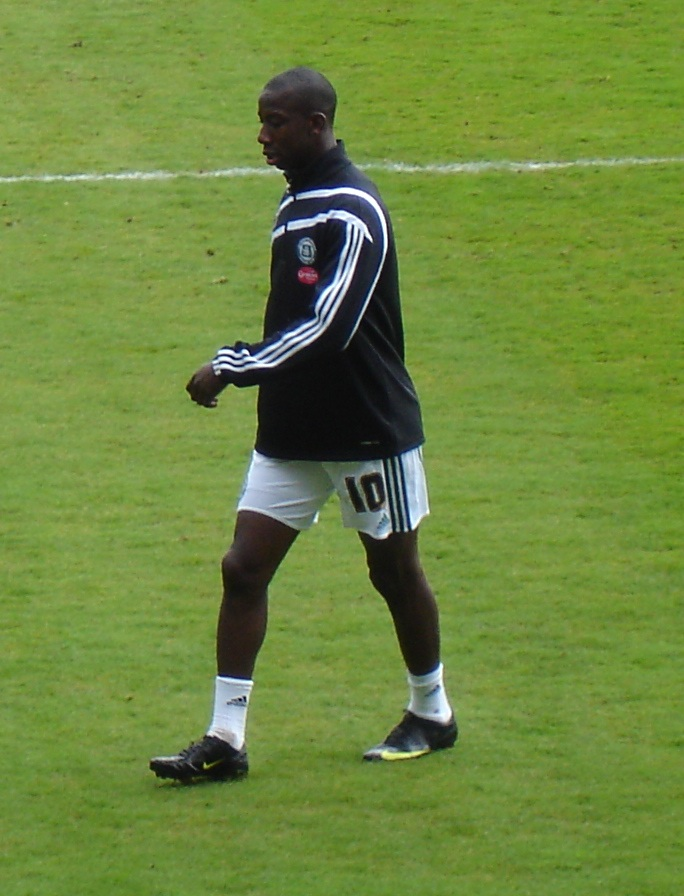
Bradley Wright-Phillips scored 4 goals in September.

Simon Walton had his season-long loan with Sheffield United cancelled after sustaining a cruciate knee ligament injury during a pre-season game. Réda Johnson scored his first goal for the club in a 1–1 draw at Colchester United. Having fallen behind to a goal from Andy Bond, the visitors equalised in the second half before Lee Molyneux was sent off for two bookable offences. Argyle won their next game 3–2 at home against Sheffield Wednesday despite being reduced to 10-men again. Captain Carl Fletcher and James O'Connor scored before Bondz N'Gala was shown a straight red card on the stroke of half time. The away side's Tommy Miller cancelled out Bradley Wright Phillips' first goal of the season before a Craig Noone header won the game. Three days later, the club suffered a 2–0 home defeat by Brighton & Hove Albion. Tommy Elphick and former player Ashley Barnes scored the goals. Bradley Wright-Phillips gave Argyle the lead at Rochdale, but the home side salvaged a 1–1 draw thanks to a goal from Craig Dawson. The club took an early two-goal lead in their next game at Swindon Town through Réda Johnson and Bradley Wright-Phillips. Swindon drew level after goals from David Prutton and Michael Rose before Prutton and Johnson were both sent off. Argyle won the game 3–2 in stoppage time thanks to a header from Wright-Phillips, giving the club their second away win of the campaign.

=== October ===
A 1–0 defeat at home to Hartlepool United followed, with Leon McSweeney scoring the winning goal late in the game. Argyle won 2–0 at Cheltenham Town in the second round of the Football League Trophy, having received a bye in the first round. Steve MacLean and Craig Noone scored the goals either side of half time. Argyle took the lead twice at home against Charlton Athletic through goals from Bradley Wright-Phillips and Yannick Bolasie before having to settle for a 2–2 draw. Striker Paul Benson scored both goals for Charlton. Liam Head joined Forest Green Rovers on loan for one month. The club were defeated 2–0 at Notts County, with Craig Westcarr and John Spicer scoring for the home side. Chelsea midfielder Conor Clifford arrived at the club on a one-month loan deal. Bradley Wright-Phillips scored twice to secure a 2–1 win at home to Huddersfield Town. The winning goal was scored after Anthony Pilkington had equalised for the visitors. Argyle played half of the game with Oldham Athletic with nine-men and looked likely to earn a point before two stoppage time goals consigned them to a 4–2 defeat. Bondz N'Gala and Kári Árnason were both sent off for the second time this season before Bradley Wright-Phillips added to Craig Noone's equaliser to give the away side the lead. Late goals from Jean-Yves Mvoto and Dean Kelly won the game for Oldham, who had scored earlier on through Dale Stephens and Oumare Tounkara.

=== November ===
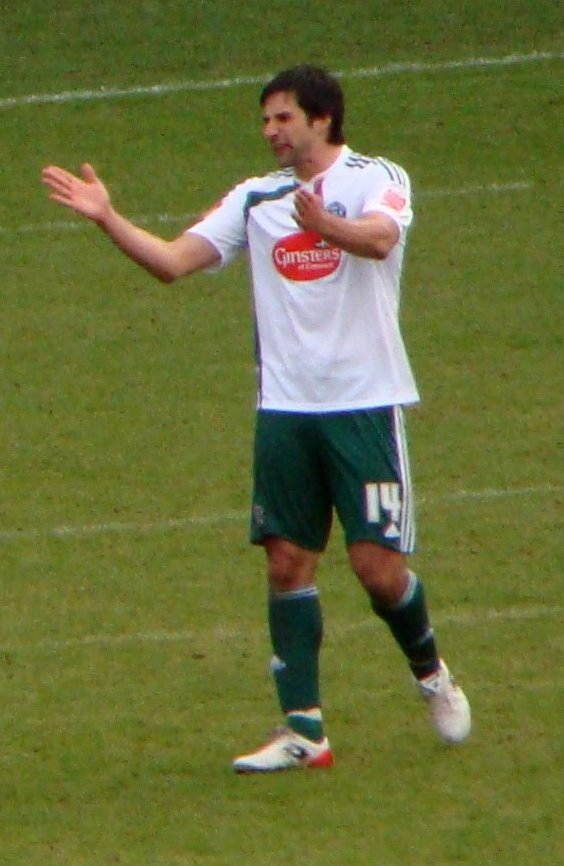
Rory Fallon joined Ipswich Town on loan in November.

Jordan Trott joined Tiverton Town on loan for one month. A volley from Dean Parrett and a brace from Bradley Wright-Phillips earned the club a 3–1 home win against Bristol Rovers. The visitors goal was scored by Will Hoskins. A 4–0 defeat by Swindon Town followed, which eliminated Argyle from the FA Cup in the first round. Sean Morrison, Charlie Austin, Vincent Péricard and Matt Ritchie scored the goals against an Argyle side which had Dean Parrett sent off on the stroke of half time. Three days later, the midfielder returned to his parent club after his season-long loan was cancelled. Argyle were then knocked out of the Football League Trophy after a 2–1 home defeat against Exeter City. A second half strike from Chris Clark cancelled out Ryan Harley's early goal before Daniel Nardiello scored the winner in stoppage time. Steve MacLean signed on loan with Oxford United for one month. A goal from Dale Jennings consigned Argyle to a 1–0 defeat at Tranmere Rovers. The loan deal for Conor Clifford from Chelsea was extended for a second month. The club suffered a fourth successive defeat at home to Brentford. Goals from Marcus Bean and Charlie MacDonald, either side of Rory Fallon's first of the season, secured a 2–1 win for the away side.

Defender Marcel Seip left the club on loan, joining Charlton Athletic until January. An early goal from striker Gavin Tomlin gave Dagenham & Redbridge the lead in the club's next game before second half goals from Craig Noone and Rory Patterson earned Argyle a 2–1 win. It was confirmed that the club had been presented with a winding-up petition from HM Revenue and Customs in October relating to unpaid tax debts. Former Leeds United and Cardiff City chairman Peter Ridsdale confirmed that he was in talks with the club regarding possible investment. "I must point out that I am not the only person in discussion with the Argyle board, there are plenty of other interested parties," he said in an interview with the BBC. "But I am certainly not in a position to announce anything at the moment as negotiations are ongoing." On the same day, Rory Fallon signed for Ipswich Town on loan until January, with a view to a permanent transfer. Midfielder Sean Kinsella signed for Stafford Rangers on loan for one month. Having not received their salaries for November, along with the playing squad, the club's staff released a statement declaring that they would do "everything they can to help the club during this difficult period."

=== December ===
Steve MacLean's loan spell with Oxford United was extended for a further month. The club's league match at Milton Keynes Dons was postponed because of a frozen pitch. Argyle were given 63 days to clear their debts with HM Revenue & Customs by a High Court judge. Ryan Leonard signed on loan with Weston-super-Mare for one month. Bradley Wright-Phillips scored two goals, either side of half time, as Argyle defeated Exeter City 2–0 in the first league meeting between the clubs since 2002. Following further wintry weather across the country, the club's next two games at Leyton Orient and Bournemouth were postponed because of frozen pitches. The club was unable to extend the loan of Conor Clifford from Chelsea when his registration was rejected by the Football League. An early goal from Stéphane Zubar was cancelled out by Lee Hughes as the club drew 1–1 with Notts County. After a week of boardroom upheaval, which included the departure of Roy Gardner as the club's chairman, Peter Ridsdale joined on a full-time basis as a football consultant. "From what I have seen the situation is precarious. No-one should underestimate the challenge that faces this club in surviving the short-term pressures," he said. "I ask everyone connected with Plymouth Argyle: the political and business communities, our creditors and anyone else who feels they can contribute to work with us." On the same day, head coach Paul Mariner was released from his contract, enabling him to pursue an opportunity abroad. "I have known Paul for a long time and working with him has been fantastic," said Peter Reid. "I'm sure he will be successful in everything he does in the future."

=== January ===
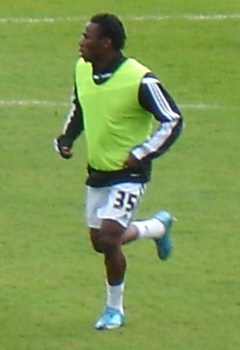
Onismor Bhasera scored his first goal for the club in January at Milton Keynes.

Midfielder Craig Noone joined Brighton & Hove Albion for an undisclosed fee. Lee Molyneux and Jordan Trott were released after being told that their contracts weren't being renewed. The club's first match of the new year ended in a 0–0 draw with Yeovil Town, which was the first ever league meeting between the two clubs. Defender Réda Johnson was transferred to Sheffield Wednesday for an undisclosed fee. Will Hoskins gave Bristol Rovers a two-goal lead in Argyle's next game before they responded through Bradley Wright-Phillips, Joe Mason and Stéphane Zubar to claim a 3–2 win. Peter Ridsdale confirmed that the tax debt which led to the club being presented with a winding-up petition had been paid. A 3–0 defeat by Bournemouth followed, who scored goals either side of half time through Danny Hollands, Liam Feeney and Marc Pugh. The loan deal for Sean Kinsella with Stafford Rangers was extended until the end of April. The club had two players sent off for the second time this season as they were defeated 3–2 at Huddersfield Town. Defenders Curtis Nelson and Stéphane Zubar were dismissed in a match which saw Argyle take a two-goal lead thanks to Joe Mason. The home side scored three before half time thanks to an own goal from Kári Árnason, Jordan Rhodes and Peter Clarke.

The club slipped to a 2–0 defeat at home to Oldham Athletic. Dale Stephens and Oumare Tounkara scored the goals. Onismor Bhasera scored at either end as Argyle claimed a 3–1 win at Milton Keynes Dons in the first ever match between the two sides. Kári Árnason and Chris Clark also scored for the visitors. Steve MacLean's stay on loan with Oxford United was extended until the end of the season. Argyle lost 2–0 at Charlton Athletic, with Scott Wagstaff and Nathan Eccleston on target for the home side. Top goalscorer Bradley Wright-Phillips was sold two days later, joining Charlton Athletic for an undisclosed fee. Ryan Leonard joined Tiverton Town on loan for one month. The club were defeated 2–1 at home to Bournemouth. Marc Pugh's opening goal was cancelled out by Rory Fallon before Steve Fletcher came off the bench to score the winner. Sean Kinsella had his contract terminated by mutual consent, allowing him to sign for Hibernians.

=== February ===
Argyle lost 1–0 to Yeovil Town in their first visit to Huish Park. The winning goal was scored by Andy Williams against an Argyle side which had Yannick Bolasie sent off in stoppage time. A fourth straight defeat followed at Brentford, who won 2–0 thanks to a brace from Myles Weston. A winding-up petition issued to the club in October 2010 was dismissed in the High Court after Argyle cleared their debts with HM Revenue & Customs. "Clearly there is still a long way to go for the football club. It still has a number of creditors. We ask for their patience," said Peter Ridsdale. "The club will be working tirelessly to make sure the creditors are paid in full and the club is restored to its full financial health." Joe Mason scored a late consolation in a 3–1 defeat at home to Tranmere Rovers. Lateef Elford-Alliyu scored twice and Enoch Showunmi added a third for the visitors. Having not received their wages on time for a third month, the Professional Footballers' Association confirmed that it was providing financial support to the club's players. On 21 February, the club issued a notice of intention to appoint an administrator and were immediately docked 10 points by the Football League which dropped them to the bottom of the League One table. "We are going to have to produce Championship form to stay up. It's going to be a battle, I don't mind a battle," said Peter Reid. "There are people worse off than us, we have to get on with it."

One day later, the club were defeated 4–0 at Brighton & Hove Albion. The home side were two goals ahead at half time thanks to goals from Glenn Murray and Chris Wood. Murray scored again in the second half before Francisco Sandaza added a late fourth. Ryan Leonard's loan spell with Tiverton Town was extended until the end of April. A penalty from Yannick Bolasie secured a 2–1 win over Colchester United. Rory Fallon's early goal was cancelled out by an own goal from Stéphane Zubar before Chris Clark was sent off. Bolasie's second half goal secured the club's first win in seven matches. "There will be light at the end of the tunnel," said Romain Larrieu, who made his 300th appearance for Argyle. "We all believe that. But it needs to be every game. This can't be a one-off. That's the standard now. We need to keep it there."

=== March ===
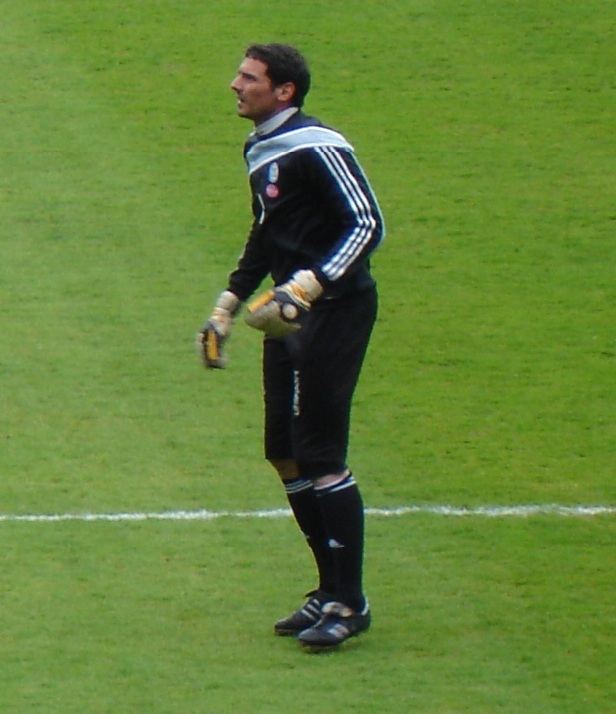
Romain Larrieu made his 300th appearance for the club at the end of February.

Having issued a notice of intention to appoint an administrator in February, the club officially went into administration on 4 March. Brendan Guilfoyle of P&A Partnership was appointed to run the club and search for a buyer. A brace from Joe Mason and one each from Bondz N'Gala and Yannick Bolasie earned Argyle a 4–2 win at Sheffield Wednesday. Giles Coke and former player Réda Johnson scored for the home side. Argyle moved off the bottom of the League One table after winning their third match in a row. They were replaced by Swindon Town, who they defeated 1–0 at home. The winning goal was scored by Rory Fallon in the tenth minute. The club's run of wins came to an end at Hartlepool United as Antony Sweeney and Sam Collins scored either side of half time in a 2–0 win for the home side. A late goal from Yannick Bolasie earned Argyle a 1–1 draw at Carlisle United, who had taken the lead in the first half through James Berrett.

As negotiations continued with potential buyers, the club's players, staff and management agreed to defer their wages for March and April until a deal was struck. "If it helps the football club to stay in existence it's not a problem. The future of Plymouth Argyle is the most important thing," said Peter Reid. "I feel for them [the office staff]. Some of the sacrifices they are having to make are incredible. But the spirit among the staff is brilliant." A second half goal from Gary Jones saw Argyle return to the foot on the table as they lost 1–0 at home to Rochdale. The club's match at home to Southampton was rearranged for 2 May due to international call-ups involving Onismor Bhasera, Rory Fallon and Joe Mason.

=== April ===
Early goals from Scott McGleish and Dean Cox saw Argyle fall nine points adrift of safety after a 2–0 defeat at Leyton Orient. The club secured their first win in five games against Walsall on 9 April at Home Park. Yannick Bolasie and Rory Patterson scored in a 2–0 win. On 16 April, Argyle took on Peterborough United at London Road. The away side led at half time thanks to a goal from captain Carl Fletcher in the 38th minute. Peterborough equalised ten minutes into the second half through Ryan Bennett before Craig Mackail-Smith won the game 2–1 for the hosts. Argyle moved off the bottom of the table on 22 April after a 1–0 win at Dagenham & Redbridge. The decisive goal was scored by Rory Patterson, who converted a 25-yard free-kick in the 48th minute. Patterson was sent off late in the game for a second bookable offence. Three days later, a goal from Simon Walton earned a 1–0 win at home against Milton Keynes Dons. A 1–0 defeat at Exeter City on 30 April meant Argyle needed to win their last two matches of the season to have a chance of avoiding relegation. James Dunne's first goal of the campaign earned all three points for the home side.

=== May ===
On 2 May, Argyle were relegated to League Two after a 3–1 defeat at home to Southampton, with 13,118 in attendance. Rickie Lambert gave the visitors the lead just before half time and they increased their lead soon after the restart through former Argyle player Ryan Dickson. Lambert scored his second goal of the game from the penalty spot before Yannick Bolasie scored a consolation goal in stoppage time. The club's last game of the season was on 7 May and they were defeated 4–1 at Home Park. Goals from Scott McGleish and Dean Cox gave the visitors a two-goal lead at half time. Yannick Bolasie reduced the deficit after 63 minutes, but two further goals from Alex Revell ensured that Argyle finished 23rd in the table.

== Match results ==
=== League One ===
7 August 2010 Match 1	Southampton	0–1	Plymouth Argyle	Southampton, Hampshire
12:15 BST		Report	Summerfield 47'	Stadium: St Mary's Stadium; Attendance: 21,727; Referee: Jon Moss

14 August 2010 Match 2	Plymouth Argyle	1–1	Carlisle United	Plymouth, Devon
15:00 BST	Patterson 90+4'	Report	Harte 68'	Stadium: Home Park; Attendance: 7,782; Referee: Roger East

21 August 2010 Match 3	Walsall	2–1	Plymouth Argyle	Walsall, West Midlands
15:00 BST	Marshall 53'; Reid 69'	Report	Mason 29'	Stadium: Bescot Stadium; Attendance: 3,966; Referee: Keith Hill

28 August 2010 Match 4	Plymouth Argyle	0–3	Peterborough United	Plymouth, Devon
15:00 BST		Report	Mackail-Smith 61', 75'; McLean 77'	Stadium: Home Park; Attendance: 7,712; Referee: Andy Haines

11 September 2010 Match 5	Colchester United	1–1	Plymouth Argyle	Colchester, Essex
15:00 BST	Bond 22'	Report	Johnson 48'	Stadium: Colchester Community Stadium; Attendance: 4,201; Referee: Danny McDermid

18 September 2010 Match 6	Plymouth Argyle	3–2	Sheffield Wednesday	Plymouth, Devon
15:00 BST	Fletcher 19'; Wright-Phillips 46'; Noone 77'	Report	O'Connor 38'; Miller 75'	Stadium: Home Park; Attendance: 7,916; Referee: Andy Penn

21 September 2010 Match 7	Plymouth Argyle	0–2	Brighton & Hove Albion	Plymouth, Devon
19:45 BST		Report	Elphick 22'; Barnes 42'	Stadium: Home Park; Attendance: 7,079; Referee: Brendan Malone

25 September 2010 Match 8	Rochdale	1–1	Plymouth Argyle	Rochdale, Greater Manchester
15:00 BST	Dawson 64'	Report	Wright-Phillips 18'	Stadium: Spotland Stadium; Attendance: 3,294; Referee: Peter Quinn

28 September 2010 Match 9	Swindon Town	2–3	Plymouth Argyle	Swindon, Wiltshire
19:45 BST	Prutton 37'; Rose 74'	Report	Johnson 4'; Wright-Phillips 8', 90+6'	Stadium: County Ground; Attendance: 9,346; Referee: Oliver Langford

2 October 2010 Match 10	Plymouth Argyle	0–1	Hartlepool United	Plymouth, Devon
15:00 BST		Report	McSweeney 87'	Stadium: Home Park; Attendance: 7,333; Referee: Simon Hooper

9 October 2010 Match 11	Plymouth Argyle	2–2	Charlton Athletic	Plymouth, Devon
15:00 BST	Wright-Phillips 4'; Bolasie 82'	Report	Benson 35', 90'	Stadium: Home Park; Attendance: 7,738; Referee: Chris Sarginson

16 October 2010 Match 12	Notts County	2–0	Plymouth Argyle	Nottingham, Nottinghamshire
15:00 BST	Westcarr 35'; Spicer 51'	Report		Stadium: Meadow Lane; Attendance: 6,333; Referee: Rob Lewis

23 October 2010 Match 13	Plymouth Argyle	2–1	Huddersfield Town	Plymouth, Devon
15:00 BST	Wright-Phillips 16', 66'	Report	Pilkington 19'	Stadium: Home Park; Attendance: 7,048; Referee: Mick Russell

30 October 2010 Match 14	Oldham Athletic	4–2	Plymouth Argyle	Oldham, Greater Manchester
15:00 BST	Stephens 5' (pen.); Tounkara 64'; Mvoto 90+3'; Kelly 90+4'	Report	Noone 7'; Wright-Phillips 48'	Stadium: Boundary Park; Attendance: 4,080; Referee: Eddie Ilderton

2 November 2010 Match 15	Plymouth Argyle	3–1	Bristol Rovers	Plymouth, Devon
19:45 GMT	Parrett 64'; Wright-Phillips 77', 90'	Report	Hoskins 67'	Stadium: Home Park; Attendance: 7,413; Referee: Rob Shoebridge

13 November 2010 Match 16	Tranmere Rovers	1–0	Plymouth Argyle	Birkenhead, Merseyside
15:00 GMT	Jennings 60'	Report		Stadium: Prenton Park; Attendance: 4,840; Referee: Bobby Madley

20 November 2010 Match 17	Plymouth Argyle	1–2	Brentford	Plymouth, Devon
15:00 GMT	Fallon 38'	Report	Bean 26'; MacDonald 67'	Stadium: Home Park; Attendance: 6,939; Referee: Phil Gibb

23 November 2010 Match 18	Plymouth Argyle	2–1	Dagenham & Redbridge	Plymouth, Devon
19:45 GMT	Noone 62'; Patterson 83'	Report	Tomlin 9'	Stadium: Home Park; Attendance: 4,960; Referee: Roger East

11 December 2010 Match 19	Plymouth Argyle	2–0	Exeter City	Plymouth, Devon
15:00 GMT	Wright-Phillips 28', 57'	Report		Stadium: Home Park; Attendance: 14,347; Referee: Grant Hegley

28 December 2010 Match 20	Plymouth Argyle	1–1	Notts County	Plymouth, Devon
15:00 GMT	Zubar 4'	Report	Hughes 7'	Stadium: Home Park; Attendance: 9,822; Referee: Steve Tanner

1 January 2011 Match 21	Plymouth Argyle	0–0	Yeovil Town	Plymouth, Devon
15:00 GMT		Report		Stadium: Home Park; Attendance: 9,720; Referee: Brendan Malone

4 January 2011 Match 22	Bristol Rovers	2–3	Plymouth Argyle	Bristol, Greater Bristol
19:45 GMT	Hoskins 8', 11'	Report	Wright-Phillips 58'; Mason 69'; Zubar 81'	Stadium: Memorial Stadium; Attendance: 5,943; Referee: Russell Booth

8 January 2011 Match 23	Bournemouth	3–0	Plymouth Argyle	Bournemouth, Dorset
15:00 GMT	Hollands 4'; Feeney 38'; Pugh 55' (pen.)	Report		Stadium: Dean Court; Attendance: 7,589; Referee: Kevin Wright

11 January 2011 Match 24	Huddersfield Town	3–2	Plymouth Argyle	Huddersfield, West Yorkshire
19:45 GMT	Árnason 18' (o.g.); Rhodes 29'; Clarke 32'	Report	Mason 1', 15'	Stadium: Galpharm Stadium; Attendance: 11,462; Referee: Paul Tierney

15 January 2011 Match 25	Plymouth Argyle	0–2	Oldham Athletic	Plymouth, Devon
15:00 GMT		Report	Stephens 47'; Tounkara 72'	Stadium: Home Park; Attendance: 8,106; Referee: Pat Miller

18 January 2011 Match 26	Milton Keynes Dons	1–3	Plymouth Argyle	Milton Keynes, Buckinghamshire
19:45 GMT	Bhasera 39' (o.g.)	Report	Bhasera 22'; Árnason 29'; Clark 80'	Stadium: Stadium:mk; Attendance: 7,189; Referee: Geoff Eltringham

22 January 2011 Match 27	Charlton Athletic	2–0	Plymouth Argyle	Charlton, Greater London
15:00 GMT	Wagstaff 55'; Eccleston 90'	Report		Stadium: The Valley; Attendance: 16,607; Referee: Fred Graham

29 January 2011 Match 28	Plymouth Argyle	1–2	Bournemouth	Plymouth, Devon
15:00 GMT	Fallon 71'	Report	Pugh 19'; Fletcher 84'	Stadium: Home Park; Attendance: 8,836; Referee: Andy D'Urso

1 February 2011 Match 29	Yeovil Town	1–0	Plymouth Argyle	Yeovil, Somerset
19:45 GMT	Williams 66'	Report		Stadium: Huish Park; Attendance: 5,208; Referee: James Linington

5 February 2011 Match 30	Brentford	2–0	Plymouth Argyle	Brentford, Greater London
15:00 GMT	Weston 35', 56'	Report		Stadium: Griffin Park; Attendance: 5,613; Referee: Darren Drysdale

12 February 2011 Match 31	Plymouth Argyle	1–3	Tranmere Rovers	Plymouth, Devon
15:00 GMT	Mason 90'	Report	Elford-Alliyu 22', 64'; Showunmi 80'	Stadium: Home Park; Attendance: 8,015; Referee: Graham Horwood

22 February 2011 Match 32	Brighton & Hove Albion	4–0	Plymouth Argyle	Brighton, East Sussex
19:45 GMT	Murray 28', 48'; Wood 41'; Sandaza 90+3'	Report		Stadium: Withdean Stadium; Attendance: 7,261; Referee: Geoff Russell

26 February 2011 Match 33	Plymouth Argyle	2–1	Colchester United	Plymouth, Devon
15:00 GMT	Fallon 8'; Bolasie 74' (pen.)	Report	Zubar 41' (o.g.)	Stadium: Home Park; Attendance: 8,982; Referee: Oliver Langford

5 March 2011 Match 34	Sheffield Wednesday	2–4	Plymouth Argyle	Sheffield, South Yorkshire
15:00 GMT	Coke 61'; Johnson 83'	Report	N'Gala 12'; Mason 31', 65'; Bolasie 79'	Stadium: Hillsborough Stadium; Attendance: 18,474; Referee: Iain Williamson

8 March 2011 Match 35	Plymouth Argyle	1–0	Swindon Town	Plymouth, Devon
19:45 GMT	Fallon 10'	Report		Stadium: Home Park; Attendance: 8,830; Referee: Phil Crossley

12 March 2011 Match 36	Hartlepool United	2–0	Plymouth Argyle	Hartlepool, County Durham
15:00 GMT	Sweeney 20'; Collins 64'	Report		Stadium: Victoria Park; Attendance: 3,059; Referee: Craig Pawson

15 March 2011 Match 37	Carlisle United	1–1	Plymouth Argyle	Carlisle, Cumbria
19:45 GMT	Berrett 34'	Report	Bolasie 84'	Stadium: Brunton Park; Attendance: 3,354; Referee: Neil Swarbrick

19 March 2011 Match 38	Plymouth Argyle	0–1	Rochdale	Plymouth, Devon
15:00 GMT		Report	Jones 49'	Stadium: Home Park; Attendance: 8,361; Referee: Simon Hooper

5 April 2011 Match 39	Leyton Orient	2–0	Plymouth Argyle	Leyton, Greater London
19:45 BST	McGleish 4'; Cox 13'	Report		Stadium: Brisbane Road; Attendance: 3,255; Referee: Michael Naylor

9 April 2011 Match 40	Plymouth Argyle	2–0	Walsall	Plymouth, Devon
15:00 BST	Bolasie 51'; Patterson 88'	Report		Stadium: Home Park; Attendance: 7,995; Referee: Keith Stroud

16 April 2011 Match 41	Peterborough United	2–1	Plymouth Argyle	Peterborough, Cambridgeshire
15:00 BST	Bennett 55'; Mackail-Smith 70'	Report	Fletcher 38'	Stadium: London Road; Attendance: 6,723; Referee: Nigel Miller

22 April 2011 Match 42	Dagenham & Redbridge	0–1	Plymouth Argyle	Dagenham, Greater London
15:00 BST		Report	Patterson 48'	Stadium: Victoria Road; Attendance: 3,559; Referee: James Linington

25 April 2011 Match 43	Plymouth Argyle	1–0	Milton Keynes Dons	Plymouth, Devon
15:00 BST	Walton 21'	Report		Stadium: Home Park; Attendance: 8,553; Referee: Steve Tanner

30 April 2011 Match 44	Exeter City	1–0	Plymouth Argyle	Exeter, Devon
12:00 BST	Dunne 46'	Report		Stadium: St James Park; Attendance: 7,869; Referee: Mark Halsey

2 May 2011 Match 45	Plymouth Argyle	1–3	Southampton	Plymouth, Devon
15:00 BST	Bolasie 90+3'	Report	Lambert 45', 59' (pen.); Dickson 49'	Stadium: Home Park; Attendance: 13,118; Referee: Andy Woolmer

7 May 2011 Match 46	Plymouth Argyle	1–4	Leyton Orient	Plymouth, Devon
15:00 BST	Bolasie 63'	Report	McGleish 13' (pen.); Cox 15'; Revell 77', 89'	Stadium: Home Park; Attendance: 11,501; Referee: Dean Whitestone

=== FA Cup ===
6 November 2010 First round	Plymouth Argyle	0–4	Swindon Town	Plymouth, Devon
15:00 GMT		Report	Morrison 23'; Austin 41'; Péricard 52'; Ritchie 69'	Stadium: Home Park; Attendance: 5,226; Referee: Darren Sheldrake

=== League Cup ===
10 August 2010 First round	Plymouth Argyle	0–1	Notts County	Plymouth, Devon
19:45 BST		Report	Spicer 52'	Stadium: Home Park; Attendance: 5,454; Referee: Steve Tanner

=== League Trophy ===
5 October 2010 Second round	Cheltenham Town	0–2	Plymouth Argyle	Cheltenham, Gloucestershire
19:45 BST		Report	MacLean 10'; Noone 46'	Stadium: Whaddon Road; Attendance: 1,597; Referee: Pat Miller

9 November 2010 Quarter-finals	Plymouth Argyle	1–2	Exeter City	Plymouth, Devon
19:45 GMT	Clark 52'	Report	Harley 2'; Nardiello 90+3'	Stadium: Home Park; Attendance: 9,431; Referee: James Linington

== League table ==
Pos	Team	Pld	W	D	L	GF	GA	GD	Pts	Promotion, qualification or relegation
20	Walsall	46	12	12	22	56	75	−19	48	
21	Dagenham & Redbridge (R)	46	12	11	23	52	70	−18	47	Relegation to Football League Two
22	Bristol Rovers (R)	46	11	12	23	48	82	−34	45	Relegation to Football League Two
23	Plymouth Argyle (R)	46	15	7	24	51	74	−23	42 (Note: Plymouth Argyle deducted 10 points for insolvency.)	Relegation to Football League Two
24	Swindon Town (R)	46	9	14	23	50	72	−22	41	Relegation to Football League Two

Updated to match(es) played on 2 May 2011. Source: BBC
Rules for classification: 1) points; 2) goal difference; 3) number of goals scored.
(R) Relegated

== Player details ==
No.	Pos.	Name	League		FA Cup		League Cup		Other		Total		Discipline	
No.	Pos.	Name	Apps	Goals	Apps	Goals	Apps	Goals	Apps	Goals	Apps	Goals	Yellow card	Red card
1	GK	(France) Romain Larrieu	18	0	1	0	1	0	2	0	22	0	1	1
2	DF	(England) Karl Duguid	26	0	1	0	1	0	1	0	29	0	0	0
3	DF	(England) Bondz N'Gala	26	1	0	0	0	0	2	0	28	1	3	2
4	MF	(Wales) Carl Fletcher	38	2	0	0	0	0	1	0	39	2	10	0
5	DF	(Benin) Réda Johnson	17	2	0	0	1	0	1	0	19	2	3	1
6	MF	(Scotland) Chris Clark	22	1	1	0	1	0	2	1	26	2	1	1
8	FW	(Northern Ireland) Rory Patterson	35	4	0	0	0	0	0	0	35	4	8	1
10	FW	(England) Bradley Wright-Phillips	17	13	1	0	1	0	2	0	21	13	1	0
10	MF	(England) Jed Harper-Penman	2	0	0	0	0	0	0	0	2	0	0	0
11	MF	(Iceland) Kári Árnason	40	1	0	0	1	0	0	0	41	1	10	2
14	FW	(New Zealand) Rory Fallon	28	4	1	0	1	0	1	0	31	4	2	0
15	DF	(Zimbabwe) Onismor Bhasera	29	1	1	0	1	0	1	0	32	1	5	0
16	FW	(Republic of Ireland) Joe Mason	34	7	1	0	0	0	1	0	36	7	0	0
17	MF	(England) Craig Noone	17	3	1	0	1	0	2	1	21	4	4	0
18	DF	(England) Jack Stephens	5	0	0	0	0	0	1	0	6	0	1	0
19	MF	(Democratic Republic of the Congo) Yannick Bolasie	35	7	1	0	0	0	2	0	38	7	5	1
20	MF	(England) Luke Summerfield	7	1	0	0	0	0	0	0	7	1	0	0
21	MF	(United States) Anton Peterlin	12	0	1	0	1	0	0	0	14	0	1	0
23	DF	(Hungary) Krisztián Timár	9	0	0	0	0	0	0	0	9	0	2	0
28	MF	(England) Simon Walton	7	1	0	0	0	0	0	0	7	1	2	0
29	DF	(Scotland) Jim Paterson	28	0	0	0	1	0	0	0	29	0	2	0
30	DF	(Netherlands) Marcel Seip	17	0	1	0	0	0	2	0	20	0	1	0
31	GK	(England) David Button	30	0	0	0	0	0	0	0	30	0	2	0
32	FW	(Scotland) Steve MacLean	7	0	0	0	1	0	1	1	9	1	1	0
34	DF	(England) Lee Molyneux	9	0	1	0	1	0	1	0	12	0	4	1
34	MF	(England) Luke Young	5	0	0	0	0	0	0	0	5	0	0	0
35	DF	(England) Curtis Nelson	35	0	1	0	1	0	1	0	38	0	4	1
36	MF	(England) Dean Parrett	8	1	1	0	0	0	1	0	10	1	1	1
36	DF	(France) Stéphane Zubar	29	2	0	0	0	0	0	0	29	2	7	1
37	MF	(Republic of Ireland) Conor Clifford	7	0	0	0	0	0	1	0	8	0	1	0
37	FW	(England) Matt Rickard	1	0	0	0	0	0	0	0	1	0	0	0

Updated to games played on 7 May 2011.
Source: Official website, Soccerbase, ESPNsoccernet
Apps = Appearances made; Goals = Goals scored.

== Transfers ==
=== In ===
Date	Pos.	Name	From	Fee
1 July 2010	DF	(England) Bondz N'Gala	(England) West Ham United	Free transfer
1 July 2010	FW	(Northern Ireland) Rory Patterson	(Northern Ireland) Glentoran	Undisclosed
28 July 2010	MF	(United States) Anton Peterlin	(England) Everton	Free transfer
3 August 2010	DF	(England) Lee Molyneux	(England) Southampton	Free transfer
31 August 2010	DF	(France) Stéphane Zubar	(Romania) Vaslui	Free transfer

=== Out ===
Date	Pos.	Name	To	Fee
1 July 2010	FW	(Scotland) Jamie Mackie	(England) Queens Park Rangers	Undisclosed
1 July 2010	MF	(Togo) Yoann Folly	(Scotland) Aberdeen	Released
1 July 2010	DF	(Scotland) David McNamee	(Scotland) Aberdeen	Released
1 July 2010	GK	(England) Lloyd Saxton	(England) Bradford City	Released
1 July 2010	DF	(England) Gary Sawyer	(England) Bristol Rovers	Free transfer
8 July 2010	FW	(Austria) Ashley Barnes	(England) Brighton & Hove Albion	Undisclosed
9 July 2010	FW	(Scotland) Alan Gow	(Scotland) Motherwell	Released
31 August 2010	DF	(England) Chris Barker	(England) Southend United	Free transfer
1 January 2011	MF	(England) Craig Noone	(England) Brighton & Hove Albion	Undisclosed
1 January 2011	DF	(England) Lee Molyneux	Unattached	Released
1 January 2011	DF	(England) Jordan Trott	(England) Elburton Villa	Released
4 January 2011	DF	(Benin) Réda Johnson	(England) Sheffield Wednesday	Undisclosed
7 January 2011	FW	(England) George Donnelly	(England) Fleetwood Town	Undisclosed
24 January 2011	FW	(England) Bradley Wright-Phillips	(England) Charlton Athletic	Undisclosed
31 January 2011	MF	(Republic of Ireland) Sean Kinsella	(Malta) Hibernians	Released
5 April 2011	DF	(England) Jack Stephens	(England) Southampton	Undisclosed

=== Loans in ===
Start date	End date	Pos.	Name	From
3 August 2010	30 June 2011	GK	(England) David Button	(England) Tottenham Hotspur
12 August 2010	9 November 2010	MF	(England) Dean Parrett	(England) Tottenham Hotspur
22 October 2010	21 December 2010	MF	(Republic of Ireland) Conor Clifford	(England) Chelsea

=== Loans out ===
Start date	End date	Pos.	Name	To
6 July 2010	4 September 2010	MF	(England) Simon Walton	(England) Sheffield United
29 July 2010	25 January 2011	FW	(England) George Donnelly	(England) Stockport County
5 August 2010	31 August 2010	DF	(England) Chris Barker	(England) Southend United
5 August 2010	30 June 2011	MF	(Northern Ireland) Damien Johnson	(England) Huddersfield Town
27 August 2010	26 September 2010	MF	(Republic of Ireland) Sean Kinsella	(England) Bridgwater Town
27 August 2010	26 September 2010	DF	(England) Jordan Trott	(England) Bridgwater Town
15 October 2010	21 November 2010	FW	(England) Liam Head	(England) Forest Green Rovers
2 November 2010	2 December 2010	DF	(England) Jordan Trott	(England) Tiverton Town
11 November 2010	30 June 2011	FW	(Scotland) Steve MacLean	(England) Oxford United
22 November 2010	8 January 2011	DF	(Netherlands) Marcel Seip	(England) Charlton Athletic
25 November 2010	17 January 2011	FW	(New Zealand) Rory Fallon	(England) Ipswich Town
29 November 2010	31 January 2011	MF	(Republic of Ireland) Sean Kinsella	(England) Stafford Rangers
11 December 2010	9 January 2011	DF	(England) Ryan Leonard	(England) Weston-super-Mare
27 January 2011	29 April 2011	DF	(England) Ryan Leonard	(England) Tiverton Town

== See also ==
- List of Plymouth Argyle F.C. seasons
