= Joe Lennox =

English footballer

Personal information
- Full name: Joe Michael Lennox
- Date of birth: 22 November 1991 (age 34)
- Place of birth: Bristol, England
- Position: Winger

Youth career
- 2006–2010: Bristol City

Senior career*
Years	Team	Apps	(Gls)
2010–2012	Bristol City	0	(0)
2011	→ Bath City (loan)	3	(0)
2012–2013	Plymouth Argyle	19	(1)
2013	Bath City	6	(1)
2013	Chippenham Town	5	(0)
- * Club domestic league appearances and goals as of 18:15, 13 November 2013 (UTC)

Joe Michael Lennox (born 22 November 1991) is an English professional footballer who plays as a winger. His previous clubs include Bristol City and Plymouth Argyle. He made his debut in the Football League in 2012.

== Playing career ==
Lennox was born in Bristol, Gloucestershire. He joined Bristol City at the age of 14 and progressed through their academy. He signed his first professional contract May 2010. In March 2011, Lennox joined Conference National side Bath City on a one-month loan. Having made his debut in a 1–0 win at Barrow, he made two more appearances for Bath. Lennox was released by Bristol City in January 2012 without making a first-team appearance. Later that month, he joined Football League Two club Plymouth Argyle until the end of the season after a successful trial period. He made his debut in a 1–1 draw with Crawley Town, and made seven more appearances for the club during the campaign.

He signed a new short-term contract in the summer, and scored his first senior goal in a 1–1 draw at Exeter City in December. With his contract about to expire, Lennox signed a one-month extension in January 2013. Lennox was released at the end of the month after the club decided against offering him a new contract. He made 23 appearances in league and cup competitions. In February, Lennox returned to Bath City on trial and then signed non-contract terms. He made his debut in a 2–0 defeat at Dover Athletic, and scored his first goal for the club in a 3–1 win at Staines Town in April. Lennox left Bath at the end of the season and spent the summer without a club before joining Chippenham Town in September. He made his debut the next day in a 3–2 defeat at Yate Town in the FA Cup. Lennox left Chippenham at the end of October, having made eight appearances in all competitions.

== Career statistics ==
As of match played on 19 October 2013.

Appearances and goals by club, season and competition
Club	Season	League			FA Cup		League Cup		Other		Total	
Club	Season	Division	Apps	Goals	Apps	Goals	Apps	Goals	Apps	Goals	Apps	Goals
Bristol City	2010–11	Championship	0	0	0	0	0	0	0	0	0	0
Bristol City	2011–12	Championship	0	0	0	0	0	0	0	0	0	0
Bristol City	Total		0	0	0	0	0	0	0	0	0	0
Bath City (loan)	2010–11	Conference Premier	3	0	0	0	0	0	0	0	3	0
Plymouth Argyle	2011–12	League Two	8	0	0	0	0	0	0	0	8	0
Plymouth Argyle	2012–13	League Two	11	1	1	0	2	0	1 (Note: Appearance in the Football League Trophy)	0	15	1
Plymouth Argyle	Total		19	1	1	0	2	0	1	0	23	1
Bath City	2012–13	Conference South	6	1	0	0	0	0	0	0	6	1
Chippenham Town	2013–14	Southern Premier	5	0	1	0	0	0	2 (Note: One appearance in the FA Trophy, one appearance in the Southern League Cup)	0	8	0
Career total			33	2	2	0	2	0	3	0	40	2
