= Maxime Blanchard =

French footballer (born 1986)

Personal information
- Full name: Maxime Edouard Camille Blanchard
- Date of birth: 27 September 1986 (age 40)
- Place of birth: Alençon, France
- Height: 1.82 m (6 ft 0 in)
- Positions: Defender; midfielder

Senior career*
Years	Team	Apps	(Gls)
2005–2008	Laval	26	(0)
2008–2009	L'Entente SSG	35	(1)
2009–2010	Moulins	35	(1)
2010–2011	Tranmere Rovers	20	(0)
2011–2014	Plymouth Argyle	104	(4)
2015–2016	Shamrock Rovers	26	(4)
2017	Newport County	1	(0)
Total		267	(10)
- * Club domestic league appearances and goals

Maxime Edouard Camille Blanchard, or just Maxi Blanchard, (born 27 September 1986) is a French former professional footballer who played as defender and defensive midfielder. He played in the Football League for Tranmere Rovers, Plymouth Argyle and Newport County, in his native league Championnat National for Laval, L'Entente SSG and Moulins, and in the League of Ireland Premier Division for Shamrock Rovers.

== Career ==
Maxime Blanchard began his career in Alençon, a commune in Normandy, before joining his first professional club – Laval. He spent two years in the youth team before being promoted to train with the senior squad during the 2005–06 season. Blanchard made his senior debut in Championnat National the following season and went on to appear in another 25 league matches for Laval over the next two years. He spent the 2008–09 campaign with L'Entente SSG, where he scored his first league goal, and the next with Moulins – making 35 league appearances in both.

He moved to England in the summer of 2010, signing for Football League One club Tranmere Rovers. He made his debut in a 0–0 draw against Huddersfield Town and went on to make 24 appearances during the 2010–11 season. He left Tranmere at the end of the campaign. Blanchard signed a short-term contract with Plymouth Argyle in November. He made his debut in a 4–1 win against Northampton Town, and extended his contract in January 2012 until the end of the season. Blanchard scored his first goal for the club in a 1–1 draw with Crawley Town.

Blanchard signed a new two-year contract in May, and won the club's Player of the Year award for the 2011–12 season. He made 28 league appearances, in which he scored two goals and, according to The Herald, had a "formidable partnership" with Darren Purse.

In 2015, he moved to Ireland and signed one-year contract with Shamrock Rovers. He left the club in July 2016 and joined the UK League Two side Newport County on a game-by-game contract.

== Career statistics ==
Appearances and goals by club, season and competition
Club	Season	League			FA Cup		League Cup		Other		Total	
Club	Season	Division	Apps	Goals	Apps	Goals	Apps	Goals	Apps	Goals	Apps	Goals
Laval	2005–06	Ligue 2	0	0	0	0	0	0	0	0	0	0
Laval	2006–07	National	4	0	1	0	0	0	0	0	5	0
Laval	2007–08	National	22	0	3	0	3	0	0	0	28	0
Laval	Total		26	0	4	0	3	0	0	0	33	0
L'Entente SSG	2008–09	National	35	1	1 (Note: Line-ups from two matches are not provided)	0	0	0	0	0	36	1
Moulins	2009–10	National	35	1	3	0	0	0	0	0	38	1
Tranmere Rovers	2010–11	League One	20	0	1	0	1	0	2 (Note: Appearances in the Football League Trophy)	0	24	0
Plymouth Argyle	2011–12	League Two	28	2	0	0	0	0	0	0	28	2
Plymouth Argyle	2012–13	League Two	40	1	1	0	2	0	1	0	44	1
Plymouth Argyle	2013–14	League Two	36	1	5	0	0	0	2	0	43	1
Plymouth Argyle	Total		104	4	6	0	2	0	3	0	115	4
Shamrock Rovers	2015	Irish Premier	17	4	0	0	0	0	0	0	17	4
Shamrock Rovers	2016	Irish Premier	9	0	0	0	0	0	0	0	9	0
Shamrock Rovers	Total		26	4	0	0	0	0	0	0	26	4
Newport County	2016–17	League Two	1	0	0	0	0	0	0	0	1	0
Career total			247	10	15	0	6	0	5	0	273	10
