= Luke Daley =

English footballer (born 1989)

Personal information
- Full name: Luke Aaron Daley
- Date of birth: 10 November 1989 (age 37)
- Place of birth: Northampton, England
- Height: 5 ft 11 in (1.80 m)
- Position: Winger

Youth career
- Mulbarton Wanderers
- 2003–2008: Norwich City

Senior career*
Years	Team	Apps	(Gls)
2008–2011	Norwich City	11	(0)
2011	→ Stevenage (loan)	2	(0)
2011–2012	Plymouth Argyle	18	(1)
2012	Lincoln City	5	(0)
2012–2014	Braintree Town	60	(8)
2014–2015	Dartford	31	(1)
2015–2018	Chelmsford City	67	(5)
Total		194	(15)
- * Club domestic league appearances and goals

Luke Aaron Daley (born 10 November 1989) is an English former professional footballer who played as a winger. He previously played for Norwich City, Stevenage, Plymouth Argyle, Lincoln City, Braintree Town, Dartford and Chelmsford City.

== Career ==
=== Norwich City ===
Daley, who lived in Cley next the Sea, was signed to Norwich after being spotted playing football for local team, Mulbarton Wanderers. After scoring four goals in six reserve team games, Daley was named as a substitute versus Stoke City in March 2008, as an 18-year-old "second-year Academy scholar". Aged 18, he was given a squad number of 39.

In November 2008, Daley came to further attention, when scoring a hat trick in a 4–2 Reserves win against an Arsenal Reserves team that "featured seven players from the squad that beat Wigan Athletic in the League Cup" a week earlier.

Daley made his professional debut for Norwich in a 1–1 draw against Burnley at Carrow Road on 21 February 2009 as a 78th-minute substitute for Jamie Cureton. He made two further substitute appearances towards the latter stages of the 2008–09 season, as Norwich were relegated to League One. The following season, Daley made his first starting appearance for Norwich, playing the whole game in the club's 4–1 home defeat to Sunderland in the League Cup. He made a total of ten appearances for Norwich in all competitions during the 2009–10 season, as the club were promoted back to the Championship.

In January 2011, Daley joined League Two side Stevenage on a one-month loan deal. Stevenage manager Graham Westley had previously tried to bring in Daley ahead of the 2010–11 season, but a thigh injury which had kept Daley out for a large part of the season meant any hopes of signing the player were scuppered. Daley made his debut for Stevenage on 22 January 2011, coming on as a 64th-minute substitute in Stevenage's 2–0 victory against Morecambe. It was to be Daley's only appearance during the first three weeks of his loan spell, appearing as an unused substitute in games against Accrington Stanley and Gillingham. He scored twice for Stevenage's reserve side in a 2–2 draw against Colchester United's second string on 9 February 2011. Daley made two appearances during his one-month loan spell at Stevenage, before returning to his parent club on 22 February.

=== Plymouth Argyle ===
Ahead of the 2011–12 season, Daley went on trial with League Two side Plymouth Argyle. He signed for Plymouth Argyle on a permanent basis on 19 July 2011. On 6 August 2011, Daley made his debut for the club in a 1–1 draw against Shrewsbury Town. On 30 August 2011, Daley scored his first goal in senior football with a long-range effort against Exeter City in the Football League Trophy. On 18 February 2012, Daley scored his first league goal in a 4–0 win over Accrington Stanley. At the end of the 2011–12 season, Daley was released after not being offered a new contract.

=== Lincoln City ===
Daley joined Grimsby Town on trial on 3 August 2012 and appeared in the club's final pre-season friendly against Stalybridge Celtic. He joined Lincoln City on a non-contract basis on 10 August, and made his debut the next day in a 1–0 win against Kidderminster Harriers.

=== Chelmsford City ===
In August 2015, Daley joined National League South side Chelmsford City after a successful trial. In January 2018, Chelmsford manager Rod Stringer confirmed Daley had left the club and retired from football.

== Career statistics ==
As of match played 17 January 2018

Appearances and goals by club, season and competition
Club	Season	League			FA Cup		League Cup		Other		Total	
Club	Season	Division	Apps	Goals	Apps	Goals	Apps	Goals	Apps	Goals	Apps	Goals
Norwich City	2008–09	Championship	3	0	0	0	0	0	—		3	0
Norwich City	2009–10	League One	7	0	0	0	1	0	2 (Note: Appearances in Football League Trophy)	0	10	0
Norwich City	2010–11	Championship	1	0	0	0	0	0	—		1	0
Norwich City	Total		11	0	0	0	1	0	2	0	14	0
Stevenage (loan)	2010–11	League Two	2	0	0	0	0	0	0	0	2	0
Plymouth Argyle	2011–12	League Two	18	1	1	0	1	0	1	1	21	2
Lincoln City	2012–13	Conference Premier	5	0	0	0	—		0	0	5	0
Braintree Town	2012–13	Conference Premier	30	7	2	0	—		0	0	32	7
Braintree Town	2013–14	Conference Premier	30	1	1	0	—		0	0	31	1
Braintree Town	Total		60	8	3	0	—		0	0	63	8
Dartford	2014–15	Conference Premier	31	1	2	0	—		5 (Note: Four appearances in the FA Trophy and one in the Kent Senior Cup)	0	38	1
Chelmsford City	2015–16	National League South	38	4	3	0	—		6 (Note: Three appearances in the Essex Senior Cup and three in the FA Trophy)	0	47	4
Chelmsford City	2016–17	National League South	22	0	1	0	—		10 (Note: Four appearances and two goals in the Essex Senior Cup, three appearances in the FA Trophy and three in the National League South play-offs)	2	33	2
Chelmsford City	2017–18	National League South	7	1	1	0	—		2 (Note: Two appearances in the Essex Senior Cup)	0	10	1
Chelmsford City	Total		67	5	5	0	0	0	18	2	90	7
Career total			194	15	11	0	2	0	26	3	233	18
