= Luke Young (footballer, born 1993) =

English football midfielder

Personal information
- Full name: Luke Young
- Date of birth: 22 February 1993 (age 33)
- Place of birth: Plymouth, England
- Height: 5 ft 8 in (1.73 m)
- Position: Midfielder

Youth career
- 2002–2011: Plymouth Argyle

Senior career*
Years	Team	Apps	(Gls)
2011–2014	Plymouth Argyle	99	(8)
2014–2018	Torquay United	133	(16)
2018–2024	Wrexham	226	(21)
2024–2026	Cheltenham Town	79	(6)
2026	Sligo Rovers	9	(0)
- * Club domestic league appearances and goals as of 11:43, 13 November 2026 (UTC)

Luke Young (born 22 February 1993) is an English professional footballer who plays as a midfielder.

Having progressed through Plymouth Argyle's youth system, Young made his debut in the Football League in 2011. He subsequently played with Torquay United, Wrexham, Cheltenham Town and Sligo Rovers.

== Club career ==
=== Early life and career ===
Young was born in Plymouth, Devon. He signed Centre of Excellence forms with Plymouth Argyle in May 2002, aged nine, and played schools football for Plymouth and Devon. In the 2008–09 season, he made 23 appearances for the club's under-18 side, including the full 90 minutes of the FA Youth Cup fifth round tie with Tottenham Hotspur. Despite still being a schoolboy, he also played once for the reserve team. He was a student at Ivybridge Community College before signing a full-time scholarship with the club. Young made a further 22 appearances for the under-18's in the 2009–10 season, scoring one goal, along with seven appearances for the reserves. Having played in 11 matches for the under-18 side the following season, where he scored two goals, and three matches for the reserves, Young was promoted to the first-team squad in January 2011.

=== Plymouth Argyle ===
He was an unused substitute in the club's league match at Charlton Athletic on 22 January 2011. Young made his debut one week later against Bournemouth, replacing Northern Ireland international Rory Patterson in the 86th minute. In doing so, he became the 29th player to represent the club in a competitive match during the 2010–11 season. "Rory took a knock, but the boy Young has got good feet. He's a bit slight, but he's a good little footballer," said manager Peter Reid. "I knew Rory was struggling, so I just wanted to have a look at him." He made his first start in a 4–0 defeat at Brighton & Hove Albion on his 18th birthday. Young signed his first professional contract in July, keeping him at the club until the summer of 2012. "Considering that I've been at the club since I was nine, then to get the two-year scholarship and then at the end of that to get the first professional contract that I've been working towards for all these years, is really special," he said on the club's official website. He scored his first goal for Argyle against Torquay United on 2 January 2012.

Young signed a new undisclosed contract in April 2012, along with teammates Curtis Nelson and Jared Sims. He finished the season by winning the club's Young Player of the Year award, having scored twice in 28 appearances.

=== Torquay United ===
On 19 June 2014, Young signed for Devon neighbours Torquay United on a two-year deal.

=== Wrexham ===
Following Torquay United's relegation to National League South in the 2017–18 season, Young signed for Wrexham on a two-year deal. He made his debut for the club on the opening day of the 2018–19 season during a 1–0 victory over Dover Athletic. Young was promoted to club captain for the 2021–22 season. He was released at the end of the 2023-24 season.

=== Cheltenham Town ===
On 18 June 2024, Young signed for recently relegated League Two side Cheltenham Town. He scored on his EFL debut for the club in a 3-2 defeat to Grimsby Town.

Young was one of nine players to leave Cheltenham following the conclusion of the 2025-26 English Football League season.

=== Sligo Rovers ===
On 13 August 2026, Young joined League of Ireland Premier Division side Sligo Rovers on a short-term deal. He made 11 appearances in all competitions by the end of the 2026 season as the club finished bottom of the league and were relegated to play in the League of Ireland First Division for the first time since 2006. At the end of the season, the club announced that he had departed following the end of his contract.

== Career statistics ==
As of match played 30 October 2026

Appearances and goals by club, season and competition
Club	Season	League			National Cup (Note: Includes FA Cup & FAI Cup)		League Cup (Note: Includes EFL Cup)		Other		Total	
Club	Season	Division	Apps	Goals	Apps	Goals	Apps	Goals	Apps	Goals	Apps	Goals
Plymouth Argyle	2010–11	League One	5	0	0	0	0	0	0	0	5	0
Plymouth Argyle	2011–12	League Two	28	2	0	0	0	0	0	0	28	2
Plymouth Argyle	2012–13	League Two	32	2	1	0	2	0	1 (Note: Appearance(s) in Football League Trophy)	0	36	2
Plymouth Argyle	2013–14	League Two	34	4	3	0	1	0	1	0	39	4
Plymouth Argyle	Total		99	8	4	0	3	0	2	0	108	8
Torquay United	2014–15	Conference Premier	39	6	0	0	—		5 (Note: Appearances in FA Trophy)	1	44	7
Torquay United	2015–16	National League	8	1	0	0	—		0	0	8	1
Torquay United	2016–17	National League	40	4	2	1	—		5	1	47	6
Torquay United	2017–18	National League	46	5	1	0	—		1	0	48	5
Torquay United	Total		133	16	3	1	—		11	2	147	19
Wrexham	2018–19	National League	41	3	5	1	—		2 (Note: One appearance in FA Trophy, one appearance in National League play-offs)	0	48	4
Wrexham	2019–20	National League	37	3	4	0	—		0	0	41	3
Wrexham	2020–21	National League	43	12	0	0	—		0	0	43	12
Wrexham	2021–22	National League	42	0	1	0	—		1 (Note: One appearance in FA Trophy)	0	44	0
Wrexham	2022–23	National League	38	2	5	0	—		0	0	43	2
Wrexham	2023–24	League Two	25	1	2	0	2	0	4	1	33	2
Wrexham	Total		226	21	17	1	2	0	7	1	252	23
Cheltenham Town	2024–25	League Two	34	4	2	0	1	0	2	0	39	4
Cheltenham Town	2025–26	League Two	45	2	3	0	1	0	1	0	50	2
Cheltenham Town	Total		79	6	5	0	2	0	3	0	89	6
Sligo Rovers	2026	LOI Premier Division	9	0	2	0	—		—		11	0
Career total			546	51	31	2	7	0	23	3	607	56

== Honours ==
Wrexham

- EFL League Two runner-up: 2023–24
- National League: 2022–23
- FA Trophy runner-up: 2021–22

Individual

- Plymouth Argyle Young Player of the Year: 2011–12
- Torquay United Player of the Year: 2014–15, 2016–17, 2017–18
- Wrexham Player of the Year: 2019–20, 2020–21
