= Matt Lecointe =

English footballer

Personal information
- Full name: Matthew Robert Lecointe
- Date of birth: 28 October 1994 (age 32)
- Place of birth: Plymouth, England
- Height: 5 ft 10 in (1.78 m)
- Position: Forward

Youth career
- 2003–2012: Plymouth Argyle

Senior career*
Years	Team	Apps	(Gls)
2011–2015	Plymouth Argyle	25	(2)

International career
2012	England U18	1	(1)
- * Club domestic league appearances and goals

Matthew Robert Lecointe (born 28 October 1994) is an English former professional footballer who played as a forward. He was capped by England at under-18 level.

== Career ==
Lecointe made his professional debut in 1–0 League Cup defeat against Millwall at Home Park on 9 August 2011, replacing Jared Sims as a second-half substitute. In his third start, he scored the opening goal in a 3–2 league win at Dagenham & Redbridge on 15 October 2011. "We did well with the build up to create the opportunity for Matty and he took his goal very well, but we see that every day so we know what he can do," said Carl Fletcher. In February 2012, he was called up to the England under-18 squad for a match against Poland the following month. Lecointe replaced Nick Powell in the second half at Alexandra Stadium and scored minutes later in a 3–0 win for England. Lecointe signed his first professional contract in May, having made 22 appearances in his debut season.

Lecointe spent the entire of the 2013–14 season injured with a ruptured cruciate ligament in his knee, despite this he was offered a new contract to stay at Plymouth, which he signed on 30 May 2014. Lecointe was released by Plymouth in May 2015 having missed the whole of the 2014–15 season due to injury.

In November 2015, Lecointe announced his retirement from professional football at the age of 21 due to ongoing injury problems with his right knee.

== Career statistics ==
Appearances and goals by club, season and competition
Club	Season	League		FA Cup		League Cup		Other		Total	
Club	Season	Apps	Goals	Apps	Goals	Apps	Goals	Apps	Goals	Apps	Goals
Plymouth Argyle	2011–12	19	2	2	0	1	0	0	0	22	2
Plymouth Argyle	2012–13	6	0	0	0	2	0	0	0	8	0
Plymouth Argyle	2013–14	0	0	0	0	0	0	0	0	0	0
Plymouth Argyle	2014–15	0	0	0	0	0	0	0	0	0	0
Career total		25	2	2	0	3	0	0	0	30	2
