= Ladjie Soukouna =

French footballer (born 1990)

Personal information
- Full name: Ladjie Soukouna
- Date of birth: 15 December 1990 (age 35)
- Place of birth: Maisons-Alfort, France
- Height: 1.92 m (6 ft 3 1/2 in)
- Positions: Defender; midfielder

Team information
- Current team: CO Les Ulis

Senior career*
Years	Team	Apps	(Gls)
2009–2011	Créteil B	13	
2011–2012	Plymouth Argyle	20	(1)
2014–?	Créteil B		
2016–	CO Les Ulis		
- * Club domestic league appearances and goals as of 11:26, 21 September 2018 (UTC)

Ladjie Soukouna (born 15 December 1990) is a French footballer who plays as a defender and midfielder. He is currently playing for French fifth tier side CO Les Ulis. Soukouna had previously played for the B-team of Créteil for two seasons and for English Football League side Plymouth Argyle for the 2011-12 season.

== Career ==
Soukouna started his career for French Championnat National side US Créteil-Lusitanos. However, he did not make an appearance for the first team, only playing in reserve team matches.

On 21 July 2011, he joined Football League Two club Plymouth Argyle, then managed by Peter Reid, on a free transfer, signing a two-year contract, after impressing during a pre-season trial. Soukouna had spent the earlier part of the year on trial with numerous English Football League clubs, including Brighton and Morecambe. He made his professional debut for Argyle in a 1–1 draw at Shrewsbury Town on 6 August. Soukouna scored his first goal for Plymouth in a 2–2 draw with Accrington Stanley on 8 October, by which point Carl Fletcher had replaced Reid as manager. Soukouna was released by the club on 31 August 2012, after an injury hit pre-season, having been told by manager Fletcher that he was surplus to requirements earlier in the week.

In 2014, Soukouna was reported to have been back in France playing for Créteil B at an amateur level.

For the 2016–17 season, it was noted that Soukouna had been signed by CO Les Ulis, then of the 7th tier of French football. For the 2018–19 season, Soukouna was still at the club, now of the Championnat National 3.
