= Simon Walton =

English footballer

Personal information
- Full name: Simon William Walton
- Date of birth: 13 September 1987 (age 39)
- Place of birth: Sherburn-in-Elmet, England
- Height: 6 ft 1 in (1.85 m)
- Position: Midfielder

Youth career
- 2003–2004: Leeds United

Senior career*
Years	Team	Apps	(Gls)
2004–2006	Leeds United	34	(3)
2006–2007	Charlton Athletic	0	(0)
2006–2007	→ Ipswich Town (loan)	19	(3)
2007	→ Cardiff City (loan)	6	(0)
2007–2008	Queens Park Rangers	5	(0)
2008	→ Hull City (loan)	10	(0)
2008–2012	Plymouth Argyle	61	(9)
2009	→ Blackpool (loan)	1	(0)
2009–2010	→ Crewe Alexandra (loan)	31	(1)
2010	→ Sheffield United (loan)	0	(0)
2012–2014	Hartlepool United	73	(4)
2014–2015	Stevenage	29	(5)
2015–2016	Crawley Town	37	(4)
2016	Garforth Town	6	(0)
2016–2017	Guiseley	34	(3)
2017–2018	Sutton United	28	(3)
2018	Billericay Town	6	(1)
2018	→ Maidstone United (loan)	5	(0)
2018–2019	Maidstone United	20	(1)
2019–2021	Havant & Waterlooville	17	(1)
Total		423	(38)

International career
2002–2003	England U16	5	(0)
2003–2004	England U17	2	(0)
2005	England U19	2	(0)

Managerial career
- 2018–2019: Maidstone United (player-assistant)
- * Club domestic league appearances and goals

Simon William Walton (born 13 September 1987) is an English former professional footballer. He played in the Football League for Leeds United, Ipswich Town, Cardiff City, Queens Park Rangers, Hull City, Plymouth Argyle, Blackpool, Crewe Alexandra, Stevenage, and Crawley Town. Walton was capped by England at under-16, under-17 and under-19 level.

== Career ==
=== Leeds United ===
Born in Sherburn-in-Elmet, Walton started his career at hometown club Leeds United. He came to attention after being sent off in a pre-season friendly against Valencia in 2004, whilst still just sixteen. He was likened to former Elland Road heroes Alan Smith and David Batty. He made his competitive debut on 7 August 2004 against Derby County, and went on to score three goals in the 2004–05 season, Leeds' first in the Championship. Walton struggled to break into the first team during the 2005–06 season with his only appearances coming after injuries to Sean Gregan, Shaun Derry, Jonathan Douglas and Gylfi Einarsson.

=== Charlton Athletic ===
In July 2006 he joined Premier League side Charlton Athletic for an initial fee of £500,000, with clauses that could create a total £1m fee. He quickly moved on loan to get some regular first-team football, moving to Ipswich Town three games into the Championship season on 18 August 2006. Walton scored several important goals for Ipswich before being loaned to another Championship side, Cardiff City, in January 2007. When playing for Cardiff, he was sent off against former club Leeds for two bookable offences.

=== Queens Park Rangers ===
Walton joined Championship side Queens Park Rangers on 27 July 2007 in a £200,000 deal, having never played a competitive game for Charlton. Shortly afterwards, he broke his leg in a friendly against Fulham.

On 29 January 2008 Walton moved to Championship play-off hopefuls Hull City on loan for the remainder of the 2007–08 season.

=== Plymouth Argyle ===
On 6 August 2008, Walton signed for Plymouth Argyle on a four-year contract. Originally proclaimed as a club record signing at £750,000, the initial fee paid was well below the £500,000 paid to Cardiff City for Steve MacLean and never surpassed it prior to the club being placed in administration in March 2011. Walton made his debut for Plymouth in a 2–2 draw with Wolves on 9 August.

On 22 December 2008 Walton was placed on the transfer list by Paul Sturrock after being sent off in a league match against Barnsley. Sturrock questioned Walton's attitude and temperament after some abject performances, and rash decisions by the player. On 26 March 2009 he joined Blackpool on loan until the end of the season. He made his debut on 11 April as a 74th-minute substitute in Blackpool's 1–0 West Lancashire Derby win over Preston North End at Deepdale.

On 31 August 2009 he joined Crewe Alexandra on loan for the 2009–10 season.

Walton joined Sheffield United on a season-long loan in July 2010. However, he suffered cruciate knee ligament damage during his first outing for the club in a pre-season friendly which proved to be a long-term injury. Following a recovery period at Bramall Lane his parent club, Plymouth Argyle, agreed to terminate his loan and recall him at the start of September. On 5 April 2011, Walton made his first appearance for nine months, and his first for Argyle since 2008, against Leyton Orient. Walton scored his first goal in the match against MK Dons on 25 April 2011. After the club appointed Carl Fletcher as caretaker manager the captaincy was handed to Walton who has become one of the senior players in the young squad. Walton has subsequently scored several goals, some as penalties, including a brace against Burton Albion on 14 January 2012.

Walton had his contract extended until the end of the 2012–13 season in April 2012. Manager Carl Fletcher revealed that Walton had agreed a new deal the previous autumn when the club was in the process of being bought by businessman James Brent. "He signed a new deal during the takeover to benefit the club," said Fletcher in an interview with BBC Radio Devon. "He agreed terms on a deal when the club was being taken over to help and aid the club in getting it out of administration."

=== Hartlepool United ===
Walton was released by Plymouth in July 2012 so he could be closer to his daughter, and signed for Hartlepool United on 6 July.

=== Stevenage ===
Walton signed for Stevenage on 30 June 2014 on a free transfer.

=== Crawley Town ===
Walton signed for Crawley Town on 18 June 2015 on a free transfer on a two-year deal.

=== Maidstone United ===
On 12 October 2018, Walton joined Maidstone United permanently after a short-term loan. At the end of December 2018, Tristan Lewis was appointed caretaker manager, with Walton as his assistant.

=== Havant & Waterlooville ===
On 11 May 2019, Havant & Waterlooville announced that Walton had joined the club as a player / coach.

== Personal life ==
Walton began dating Nicola Tappenden, a glamour model, in 2007 and they went on to be engaged. He became a father in November 2008 when Tappenden gave birth to a baby girl named Poppy. His younger sister, Sophie, represented England at youth international level, and has played in the Women's Premier League and Women's Super League. Both Simon and Sophie studied at Boston Spa Academy during their time as Leeds United Academy scholars.

== Career statistics ==
As of match played 23 April 2016

Appearances and goals by club, season and competition
Club	Season	League			FA Cup		League Cup		Other		Total	
Club	Season	Division	Apps	Goals	Apps	Goals	Apps	Goals	Apps	Goals	Apps	Goals
Leeds United	2004–05	Championship	30	3	1	0	2	0	0	0	33	3
Leeds United	2005–06	Championship	4	0	1	0	0	0	0	0	5	0
Leeds United	Total		34	3	2	0	2	0	0	0	38	3
Charlton Athletic	2006–07	Championship	0	0	0	0	0	0	0	0	0	0
Ipswich Town (loan)	2006–07	Championship	19	3	0	0	0	0	0	0	19	3
Cardiff City (loan)	2006–07	Championship	6	0	0	0	0	0	0	0	6	0
Queens Park Rangers	2007–08	Championship	5	0	0	0	0	0	0	0	5	0
Hull City (loan)	2007–08	Championship	10	0	0	0	0	0	0	0	10	0
Plymouth Argyle	2008–09	Championship	15	0	0	0	0	0	0	0	15	0
Plymouth Argyle	2009–10	Championship	0	0	0	0	0	0	0	0	0	0
Plymouth Argyle	2010–11	League One	7	1	0	0	0	0	0	0	7	1
Plymouth Argyle	2011–12	League One	41	8	2	0	1	0	1 (Note: Appearance(s) in Football League Trophy)	0	45	8
Plymouth Argyle	Total		63	9	2	0	1	0	1	0	67	9
Crewe Alexandra	2009–10	League Two	31	1	1	0	0	0	1	0	33	1
Sheffield United (loan)	2010–11	Championship	0	0	0	0	0	0	0	0	0	0
Hartlepool United	2012–13	League One	34	1	1	0	1	0	1	0	37	1
Hartlepool United	2013–14	League Two	39	3	3	0	1	0	3	0	46	3
Hartlepool United	Total		73	4	4	0	2	0	4	0	83	4
Stevenage	2014–15	League Two	29	5	2	0	0	0	2 (Note: One appearance in the Football League Trophy and one appearance in the League Two play-offs)	0	33	5
Crawley Town	2015–16	League Two	37	4	1	0	0	0	1	0	39	4
Career total			307	29	12	0	5	0	9	0	333	29
