= Jamie Griffiths =

English footballer (born 1992)

Personal information
- Full name: Jamie Griffiths
- Date of birth: 4 January 1992 (age 34)
- Place of birth: Bury St Edmunds, England
- Height: 5 ft 11 in (1.80 m)
- Positions: Midfielder; forward

Youth career
- 1999–2010: Ipswich Town

Senior career*
Years	Team	Apps	(Gls)
2010–2011	Ipswich Town	0	(0)
2011	→ Plymouth Argyle (loan)	9	(0)
2012	A.F.C. Sudbury	11	(1)
2012–2014	Kettering Town	30	(3)
2014–2017	Long Melford	77	(56)
2017–	Needham Market		
2019–2022	→ Long Melford (loan)		
- * Club domestic league appearances and goals as of 21:34, 18 June 2017 (UTC)

Jamie Griffiths (born 4 January 1992) is an English footballer who plays as a midfielder or striker for Long Melford on loan from Needham Market. He previously played for Ipswich Town, Plymouth Argyle, Kettering Town, A.F.C. Sudbury and Long Melford F.C.

== Career ==
=== Ipswich Town ===
Griffiths joined Ipswich Town at the age of eight, having been spotted playing for local Suffolk team Cornard Dynamos. He progressed through the club's youth system and was offered a professional contract by manager Roy Keane in April 2010.

Griffiths made his first team debut in a 3–1 League Cup win against Northampton Town on 26 October 2010, coming on as a substitute for Carlos Edwards.

A double stress fracture in his back kept Griffiths out for a couple of months, but he was offered a six-month contract extension by new manager Paul Jewell. "Obviously I am delighted," he said in the Suffolk Free Press. "It was the best outcome I could have hoped for. It is the worst injury I have had and I am just looking forward to getting fit as soon as possible and pushing on from there."

==== Plymouth Argyle (loan) ====
Griffiths joined Plymouth Argyle on a one-month loan on 31 August 2011, reuniting him with former team-mate Conor Hourihane.

He made his debut on 3 September in a 2–1 defeat to Burton Albion, and the loan was extended for a second month in October. In his final appearance, he received a red card for a dangerous tackle while playing upfront against Cheltenham Town.

Griffiths returned to Ipswich in November, having made nine appearances for Argyle, and was released when his contract expired in December.

=== A.F.C. Sudbury ===
He joined Isthmian League Division One North side A.F.C. Sudbury in March 2012 after having trials with Colchester United and Gillingham. He rejected a contract offer with Braintree Town to join Sudbury, with a view to trialling at more Football League clubs in the summer.

=== Kettering Town ===
Griffiths joined Southern League Premier Division club Kettering Town in July on a two-year contract. "Jamie came to the trial game and we liked what we saw. He's very athletic and although he's still got a lot to learn, he has done very well so far," said Kettering assistant manager Dean Greygoose.

=== Long Melford ===
In July 2014 Griffiths joined Eastern Counties League Division One club Long Melford. Griffiths made 33 appearances in his début season, scoring 25 goals, helping Melford earn promotion to the Premier Division for the first time in their history. On a personal level, he also picked up end-of-season awards for the clubs 'Player of the Season', 'Supporters Player of the Season' and 'Top Goalscorer'.

Griffiths suffered cruciate ligament damage to his left knee during a preseason friendly in August 2016, in what would prove to be his final game for the club, with a scan confirming a nine-month layoff. Reacting to the setback Griffiths commented "I twisted one way and I heard a really loud crack.I just hoped I hadn't torn my ACL, but unfortunately that's what's happened, It's the worst injury I've ever had."

=== Needham Market ===
In June 2017, Griffiths opted to join Isthmian League side Needham Market. He returned to Long Melford on loan in July 2019.

== Personal life ==
Griffiths grew up in Great Cornard with his parents Alan and Tracey and sisters Danielle and Rebecca.
