= Ollie Chenoweth =

English footballer (born 1992)

Personal information
- Full name: Oliver Ralph Chenoweth
- Date of birth: 17 February 1992 (age 34)
- Place of birth: Liskeard, England
- Height: 6 ft 1 in (1.85 m)
- Position: Goalkeeper

Youth career
- 2005–2010: Plymouth Argyle

Senior career*
Years	Team	Apps	(Gls)
2010–2011	Plymouth Argyle	0	(0)
2011	Bideford	?	(0)
2011–2013	Plymouth Argyle	1	(0)
2012	→ Truro City (loan)	12	(0)
2012	→ Frome Town (loan)	3	(0)
2013–2014	Truro City	23	(0)
- * Club domestic league appearances and goals as of July 2014

Oliver Ralph Chenoweth (born 17 February 1992) is an English footballer who plays as a goalkeeper for Southern League club Truro City. He made one appearance in the Football League for Plymouth Argyle.

== Career ==
Chenoweth joined the Plymouth Argyle Centre of Excellence in 2005, joining from his local side Venterdon. He progressed through the youth system and signed a six-month professional contract in May 2010. Chenoweth was released in May 2011 due to the club's financial problems and their relegation to Football League Two. He then joined Southern League Division One South & West side Bideford, keeping seven clean sheets as they propelled to the top of the league. In December 2011, Chenoweth was given the chance to return Plymouth after training with the club, and signed a contract until the end of the season. In January 2012, he was loaned out to Conference South side Truro City on an initial one-month loan, which was later extended until the end of the season. He made 12 appearances for the club in the Conference South.

He was recalled by Plymouth in April 2012 as cover for Romain Larrieu in a 1–0 win against Aldershot Town, and made his first team debut on 28 April in a 2–2 draw at Morecambe. He joined Southern League Premier Division club Frome Town on loan for one month in November, and made three league appearances. Chenoweth was released at the end of the 2012–13 season, and subsequently re-signed for Truro City, this time on a permanent contract.
