= Matt Rickard =

English footballer (born 1993)

Personal information
- Date of birth: 1993 (age 32–33)
- Place of birth: Exeter, England
- Position: Striker

Youth career
- 2006–2011: Plymouth Argyle
- 2011–2012: Michigan Wolverines
- 2013–2015: Oakland Golden Grizzlies

Senior career*
Years	Team	Apps	(Gls)
2011	Plymouth Argyle	1	(0)
2014–2015	Lansing United		
- * Club domestic league appearances and goals

Matthew Rickard (born 1993) is an English former footballer who played as a striker.

== Club career ==
Rickard was a product of the Plymouth Argyle Centre of Excellence. He made his first-team debut as a substitute in a 2–0 defeat against Oldham Athletic on 15 January 2011.

Rickard moved to the US in 2011 and enrolled at the University of Michigan thus becoming one of the Michigan Wolverines who play in the Big Ten Conference in the NCAA Division 1. After one season at Michigan, he transferred to Oakland University and played three seasons for the Oakland Golden Grizzlies, twice qualifying for the post-season NCAA Division I Men's Soccer Championship as the Horizon League tournament champions.

After retiring from football, Rickard now works at Mercedes Benz South West in Exeter.
