= Jared Sims =

English footballer (born 1993)

Personal information
- Full name: Jared Ben Phillips Sims
- Date of birth: 16 October 1993 (age 33)
- Place of birth: Truro, England
- Height: 1.76 m (5 ft 9 1/2 in)
- Position: Forward

Team information
- Current team: Falmouth

Youth career
- 2005–2012: Plymouth Argyle

Senior career*
| Years | Team | Apps | (Gls) |
| 2011–2013 | Plymouth Argyle | 9 | (0) |
| 2013–2014 | Truro City | 23 | (4) |
| 2014–2016 | St Austell | 43 | (19) |
| 2016–2017 | St Blazey | | |
| 2017–2020 | Godolphin Atlantic | | |
| 2020–2021 | Mullion | | |
| 2021–2023 | Mousehole | | |
| 2023– | Falmouth | | |
- * Club domestic league appearances and goals

Jared Phillip John Sims (born 16 October 1993) is an English footballer who plays as a forward Falmouth. Born in Truro, he previously played in the Football League for Plymouth Argyle, having progressed through the club's youth system. He later played for a single season at Truro City.

== Career ==
Sims made his professional debut on 9 August 2011, in the Football League Cup 1–0 defeat to Millwall at Home Park. This followed his appearance as an unused substitute in the 1–1 draw away at Shrewsbury the previous Saturday. He signed a new undisclosed contract in April 2012, his first as a professional, along with teammates Curtis Nelson and Luke Young. He helped the club's under-18 team win the South West Conference of the Football League Youth Alliance later that month. He ended his debut season in the first team with four appearances in all competitions. Sims made two more appearances for Argyle before being released at the end of the 2012–13 season.

In June 2013, Sims signed for his home town club Truro City prior to their first season back in the Southern League.

Sims has now signed for Falmouth Town FC, in the Western Premier league. He won player of the year in 2023 thanks to Ben Phillips
