= List of Plymouth Argyle F.C. records and statistics =

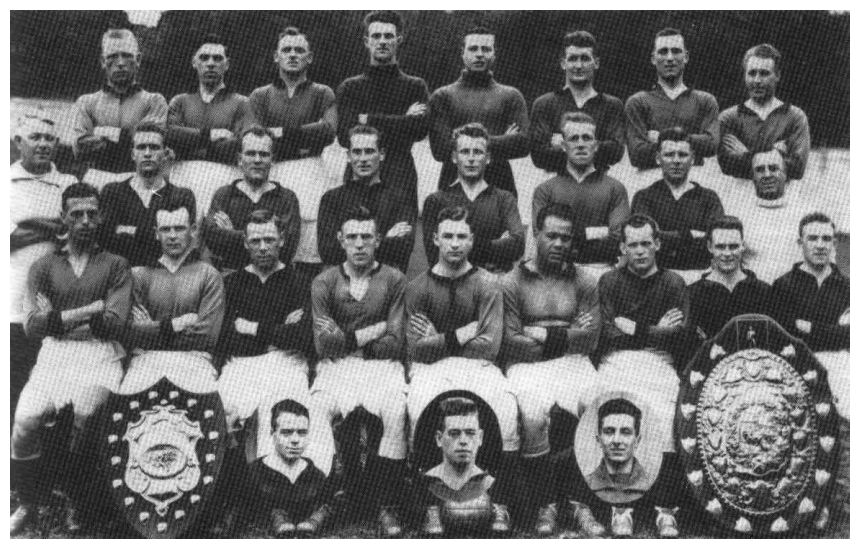
The Plymouth Argyle squad for the 1929–30 season, winners of the Football League Third Division South.

Plymouth Argyle Football Club are an English professional association football club based in Plymouth, Devon. They compete in the EFL Championship, the second tier of English football, following promotion from the 2022–23 EFL League One. The club was formed in 1886 as Argyle Football Club, a name which was retained until 1903 when the club became professional and were elected to the Southern Football League. The club also entered English football's premier knockout competition, the Football Association Challenge Cup, for the first time that same year. The club joined the Football League in 1920, and have competed there since then, achieving multiple league titles, promotions, and relegations.

This list encompasses the major honours won by Plymouth Argyle, records set by the club, their managers and their players. The player records section includes details of the club's leading goalscorers and those who have made most appearances in first-team competitions. It also records notable achievements by Plymouth Argyle players on the international stage, and the highest transfer fees paid and received by the club. Attendance records at Home Park, the club's ground since 1901, are also included in the list.

== Honours ==
Plymouth Argyle have won multiple titles in domestic competition. They have won the third tier of English football four times, which is a record. In their second season as a professional club they won their first title, the Western League, in 1905. The club's most recent title came in 2004 when they won the Football League Second Division.

=== Domestic ===
==== League ====
- Football League Second Division

Winners (1): 2003–04

- Football League Third Division

Winners (2): 1958–59, 2001–02
Runners-up (2): 1974–75, 1985–86

- Football League Third Division South

Winners (2): 1929–30, 1951–52
Runners-up (6): 1921–22, 1922–23, 1923–24, 1924–25, 1925–26, 1926–27

- Southern Football League

Winners (1): 1912–13
Runners-up (2): 1907–08, 1911–12

- Western Football League

Winners (1): 1904–05
Runners-up (1): 1906–07

==== Cups ====
- Football League Third Division Play-offs

Winners (1): 1996

== Player records ==
=== Appearances ===
Plymouth Argyle's appearance record is held by Kevin Hodges, who played 620 times for the club over the course of 15 seasons from 1978 to 1992. Hodges also holds the records for appearances made in league, FA Cup, and League Cup competition. The player to have made the most appearances in the current squad is Joe Edwards with 252.

- Most appearances in all competitions: Kevin Hodges, 620.
- Most League appearances: Kevin Hodges, 530.
- Most FA Cup appearances: Kevin Hodges, 39.
- Most League Cup appearances: Kevin Hodges, 35.
- Youngest first-team player: Freddie Issaka, 15 years and 34 days (against Newport County, 31 August 2021).
- Oldest first-team player: Peter Shilton, 44 years and 21 days (against Burnley, 9 October 1993).
- Oldest debutant: Peter Shilton, 42 years and 199 days (against Charlton Athletic, 4 April 1992).
- Longest-serving player: Kevin Hodges, 14 years and 71 days (from 1978 to 1992).

=== Most appearances ===
Competitive, professional matches only, appearances as substitute in brackets. Bold indicates still playing at the club.

#	Name	Years	League ^{[A]}	FA Cup	League Cup	Other ^{[B]}	Total
1	(England) Kevin Hodges	1978–1992	530 (28)	39 (0)	35 (3)	16 (3)	620 (34)
2	(Scotland) Sammy Black	1924–1938	470 (0)	21 (0)	0 (0)	0 (0)	491 (0)
3	(Scotland) Fred Craig	1912–1930	439 (0)	28 (0)	0 (0)	0 (0)	467 (0)
4	(England) Johnny Williams	1955–1966	412 (1)	19 (0)	17 (0)	0 (0)	448 (1)
5=	(England) Pat Jones	1947–1958	425 (0)	16 (0)	0 (0)	0 (0)	441 (0)
5=	(England) Johnny Hore	1965–1975	400 (7)	17 (0)	23 (0)	1 (0)	441 (7)
7	(England) Paul Wotton	1995–2008; 2012–2015	394 (35)	23 (0)	11 (1)	10 (1)	438 (37)
8	(Republic of Ireland) Mickey Evans	1990–1997; 2001–2006	387 (75)	22 (2)	13 (2)	10 (2)	432 (81)
9	(England) Jack Leslie	1921–1934	384 (0)	17 (0)	0 (0)	0 (0)	401 (0)
10	(Wales) Moses Russell	1914–1930	375 (0)	25 (0)	0 (0)	0 (0)	400 (0)

=== Goalscorers ===
Plymouth Argyle's all-time leading goalscorer is Sammy Black, who scored 184 goals for the club over the course of 14 seasons from 1924 to 1938. Black also holds the record for goals scored in league competition. The records for goals scored in FA Cup and League Cup competition are held by Wilf Carter, and Sean McCarthy respectively.

- Most goals in all competitions: Sammy Black, 184.
- Most league goals: Sammy Black, 176.
- Most FA Cup goals: Wilf Carter, 10.
- Most League Cup goals: Sean McCarthy, 8.
- Most goals in a season: Jack Cock, 32 (during the 1926–27 season).
- Most goals in one match: Wilf Carter, 5.
- Most hat-tricks in a season: Frank Richardson (1921–22), Jack Cock (1926–27), Wilf Carter (1957–58), 3.
- Most hat-tricks: Wilf Carter, 8.
- Highest-scoring substitute: Mickey Evans, 9.
- Most games without scoring for an outfield player: Jimmy Rae, 258.
- Fastest goal scored: Nick Chadwick (against Crystal Palace, 17 December 2005) and Onismor Bhasera (against AFC Wimbledon, 7 March 2012), 11 seconds.

=== Top goalscorers ===
Competitive, professional matches only. Matches played (including as substitute) appear in brackets.

#	Name	Years	League ^{[A]}	FA Cup	League Cup	Other ^{[B]}	Total
1	(Scotland) Sammy Black	1924–1938	176 (470)	8 (21)	0 (0)	0 (0)	**184** (491)
2	(England) Wilf Carter	1957–1964	134 (254)	10 (11)	4 (10)	0 (0)	**148** (275)
3	(England) Tommy Tynan	1983–1985; 1986–1990	127 (262)	6 (23)	6 (17)	6 (8)	**145** (310)
4	(England) Jack Leslie	1921–1934	132 (384)	4 (17)	0 (0)	0 (0)	**136** (401)
5	(England) Maurice Tadman	1947–1955	108 (240)	4 (13)	0 (0)	0 (0)	**112** (253)
6	(England) Jack Vidler	1929–1939	95 (242)	8 (14)	0 (0)	0 (0)	**103** (256)
7	(England) Fred Burch	1906–1915	89 (227)	3 (12)	0 (0)	0 (0)	**92** (239)
8	(England) Kevin Hodges	1978–1992	81 (530)	4 (39)	0 (35)	2 (16)	**87** (620)
9	(England) Ray Bowden	1927–1933	82 (145)	3 (8)	0 (0)	0 (0)	**85** (153)
10=	(England) George Dews	1947–1955	76 (257)	5 (14)	0 (0)	0 (0)	**81** (271)
10=	(Republic of Ireland) Mickey Evans	1990–1997; 2001–2006	73 (387)	4 (22)	1 (13)	3 (10)	**81** (432)

=== International ===
- First capped player: Richard Morris, for Wales on 11 March 1908.
- Most international caps while a Plymouth Argyle player: Tony Capaldi, 21 for Northern Ireland.
- Most international goals while a Plymouth Argyle player: Carlo Corazzin, for Canada and Rory Fallon for New Zealand, 2.
- First Plymouth Argyle player to appear at a World Cup: George Baker for Wales, at 1958 FIFA World Cup.
- Most World Cup appearances by a former Plymouth Argyle player: Paul Mariner, 5 for England in 1982.
- Most World Cup goals by a former Plymouth Argyle player: Paul Mariner, 1 for England in 1982.

=== Transfers ===
==== Record transfer fees paid ====
#	Fee	Paid to	For	Date	Notes
1	£1.15 Million	Norwich City	(England) Bali Mumba	21 July 2023	
1=	£1.15 Million	Swansea City	(England) Morgan Whittaker	17 July 2023	
2	£750,000	QPR	(England) Simon Walton	6 August 2008	
3	£500,000	Cardiff City	(Scotland) Steven MacLean	18 January 2008	
4	£400,000	Debreceni VSC	(Hungary) Péter Halmosi	17 May 2007	
5=	£300,000	Swansea City	(New Zealand) Rory Fallon	19 January 2007	
5=	£300,000	Manchester United	(England) Sylvan Ebanks-Blake	14 July 2006	
5=	£300,000	Port Vale	(England) Peter Swan	22 July 1994	

==== Record transfer fees received ====
#	Fee	Received from	For	Date	Notes
1	£2.5m	Hull City	(Hungary) Péter Halmosi	16 July 2008	
2	£2.25m	Ipswich Town	(England) David Norris	31 January 2008	
3	£1.5m	Wolverhampton Wanderers	(England) Sylvan Ebanks-Blake	11 January 2008	
4	£1.5m	Everton	(England) Dan Gosling	3 January 2008	
5	£750,000	Southampton	(Republic of Ireland) Mickey Evans	3 March 1997	

== Managerial records ==
- First manager: Frank Brettell, from 1 August 1903 to 31 May 1905.
- Longest-serving manager by time: Bob Jack, two spells, from 1 August 1905 to 31 May 1906, and 1 August 1910 to 1 April 1938.
- Longest-serving manager by matches: Bob Jack, managed the club for 1,093 matches over a period that spanned 28 years.

== Club records ==
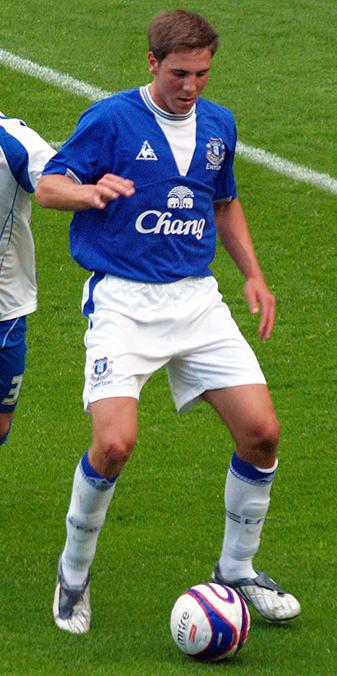
Dan Gosling, the club's first million pound teenager.

=== Matches ===
==== Firsts ====
- First match: Argyle Football Club 0–2 Caxton, a friendly match, 16 October 1886.
- First Western League match: West Ham United 0–1 Plymouth Argyle, 1 September 1903.
- First Southern League match: Plymouth Argyle 2–0 Northampton Town, 5 September 1903.
- First FA Cup match: Plymouth Argyle 7–0 Whiteheads, first qualifying round 31 October 1903.
- First Football League match: Plymouth Argyle 1–1 Norwich City, Third Division, 28 August 1920.
- First League Cup match: Plymouth Argyle 2–0 Southport, first round, 12 October 1960.

==== Wins ====
- Record win: 8–1 against Millwall in Second Division, 16 January 1932, and Hartlepool United in Second Division, 7 May 1994.
- Record FA Cup win: 6–0 against Corby Town, third round, 22 January 1966.
- Record League Cup win: 4–0 against Portsmouth, second round, 9 October 1973.
- Most league wins in a season: 31 wins out of 46 games (during the 2001–02 season).
- Fewest league wins in a season: 8 wins out of 42 games (during the 1949–50, 1963–64, 1976–77 seasons).

==== Defeats ====
- Record defeat: 0–9 against Stoke City in Second Division, 17 December 1960.
- Record FA Cup defeat: 1–7 against Tottenham Hotspur, first round replay, 19 January 1910.
- Record League Cup defeat: 0–6 against West Ham United, second round, 26 September 1962.
- Most league defeats in a season: 31 defeats out of 42 games (during the 1945–46 season).
- Fewest league defeats in a season: 4 defeats out of 42 games (during th a season: 35 in 42 games (during the 1920–21 season, Third Division).
- Most league goals conceded in a season: 120 in 42 games (during the 1945–46 season, Football League South).
- Fewest league goals conceded in a season: 24 in 42 games (during the 1921–22 season, Third Division South).

=== Points ===
- Most points in a season (two for a win): 68 in 42 games (during the 1929–30 season, Third Division South).
- Fewest points in a season (two for a win): 27 in 42 games (during the 1967–68 season, Second Division).
- Most points in a season (three for a win): 102 in 46 games (during the 2001–02 season, Third Division).
- Fewest points in a season (three for a win): 46 in 46 games (during the 1994–95 season, Second Division).

=== Attendances ===
- Record highest attendance: 43,596 (against Aston Villa, Second Division, 10 October 1936).
- Highest FA Cup attendance: 43,426 (against Huddersfield Town, third round, 13 January 1934).
- Highest League Cup attendance: 30,390 (against Manchester City, semi-final, 23 January 1974).
- Record lowest attendance: 944 (against AFC Bournemouth, EFL Trophy, 10 December 1996).
- Lowest FA Cup attendance: 1,870 (against Whiteheads, first qualifying round, 31 October 1903).
- Lowest League Cup attendance: 1,834 (against Walsall, first round, 24 August 1999).
- Record highest attendance at a neutral venue: 79,389 at Wembley (against Bolton Wanderers, EFL Trophy Final, 2 April 2023).
- Record highest attendance on the road: 65,386 at Highbury (against Arsenal, FA Cup fourth round, 23 January 1932).

== Footnotes ==
A. ^{a} ^{b} Appearances made in the abandoned 1939–40 season and subsequent wartime competitions are unofficial and therefore excluded.

B. ^{a} ^{b} Appearances and goals in the EFL Trophy, Full Members Cup, Watney Cup, Anglo-Scottish Cup, and Football League Group Cup.
