= List of Plymouth Argyle F.C. managers =

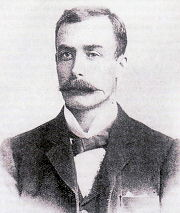
Frank Brettell became the club's first manager in August 1903.

Plymouth Argyle Football Club is an English association football club based in Plymouth, Devon. Founded in 1886 as Argyle Football Club, they became a professional club in January 1903, and were elected to the Southern League ahead of the 1903–04 season. The club won the Southern League championship in 1913 and finished as runners-up on two occasions, before being elected to the Football League in 1920, where they compete to this day, as a founder member of the Third Division. Argyle won their first Football League championship, and promotion to the Second Division for the first time, ten years later in 1930. As of May 2011, the club has won five championships in the Football League, gained promotion on eight occasions, and been relegated nine times. Four of those league championships were won in the third tier, which is a divisional record. Argyle have made one appearance at Wembley Stadium, in which they won the 1996 Third Division play-off final. The club has also achieved moderate success in domestic cup competitions; they reached the semi-finals of the FA Cup in 1984, and the quarter-finals in 2007. Argyle have also reached the semi-finals of the League Cup twice, in 1965 and 1974.

In that time, the club has had 37 permanent managers. They are listed below in chronological order. Including caretakers, 49 individuals have held responsibility for team selection. The club's first manager was Frank Brettell, who was appointed in March 1903. He led the club to the Western League title, their first in the professional game, in 1905 before retiring. The most successful person to manage the club is Bob Jack, who was also Argyle's first professional player. He won the Southern League in 1913 and the Third Division South in 1930, having finished as runner-up on six occasions. He then established the club in the second tier of English football and guided them to their joint highest league finish of 4th in the Second Division. He is also the club's longest serving manager. Having spent one year as player-manager during the 1905–06 season, Jack returned in 1910 as manager and club secretary. He retired in 1938 after 29 years of service.

Four people have managed the club in two separate terms, of whom the most recent was Paul Sturrock. The first was Bob Jack in 1910 and it wasn't equalled until 1970 when Ellis Stuttard returned for a second two-year spell. Malcolm Allison was the third in 1978, having previously joined the club in 1964, and Sturrock made it four in November 2007, returning to Home Park three years after departing to manage in the Premier League. 12 of the club's managers have also played for Argyle competitively, not including Ian Holloway who came out of retirement in October 2006 to play for the club's reserve team. Outside forward Bob Jack was the first in 1905 and he has been succeeded by full back Jimmy Rae and centre forward Jack Rowley, both of whom also won league titles with the club, among others. 13 other people have been in charge as a caretaker, including former players Steve McCall and Kevin Summerfield (twice). Five managers have won major league championships with the club, of whom both Jack and Sturrock were successful twice. Three others have achieved promotion to a higher division.

== Managers ==
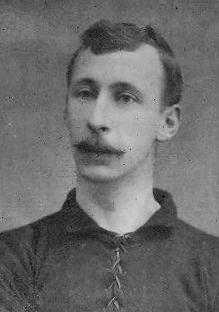
Bob Jack led the club into the Football League in 1920.

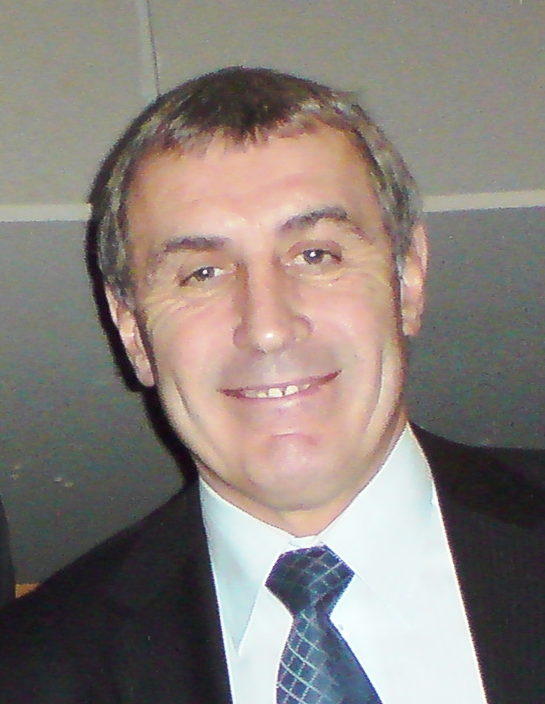
Peter Shilton guided the club to the play-offs for the first time.

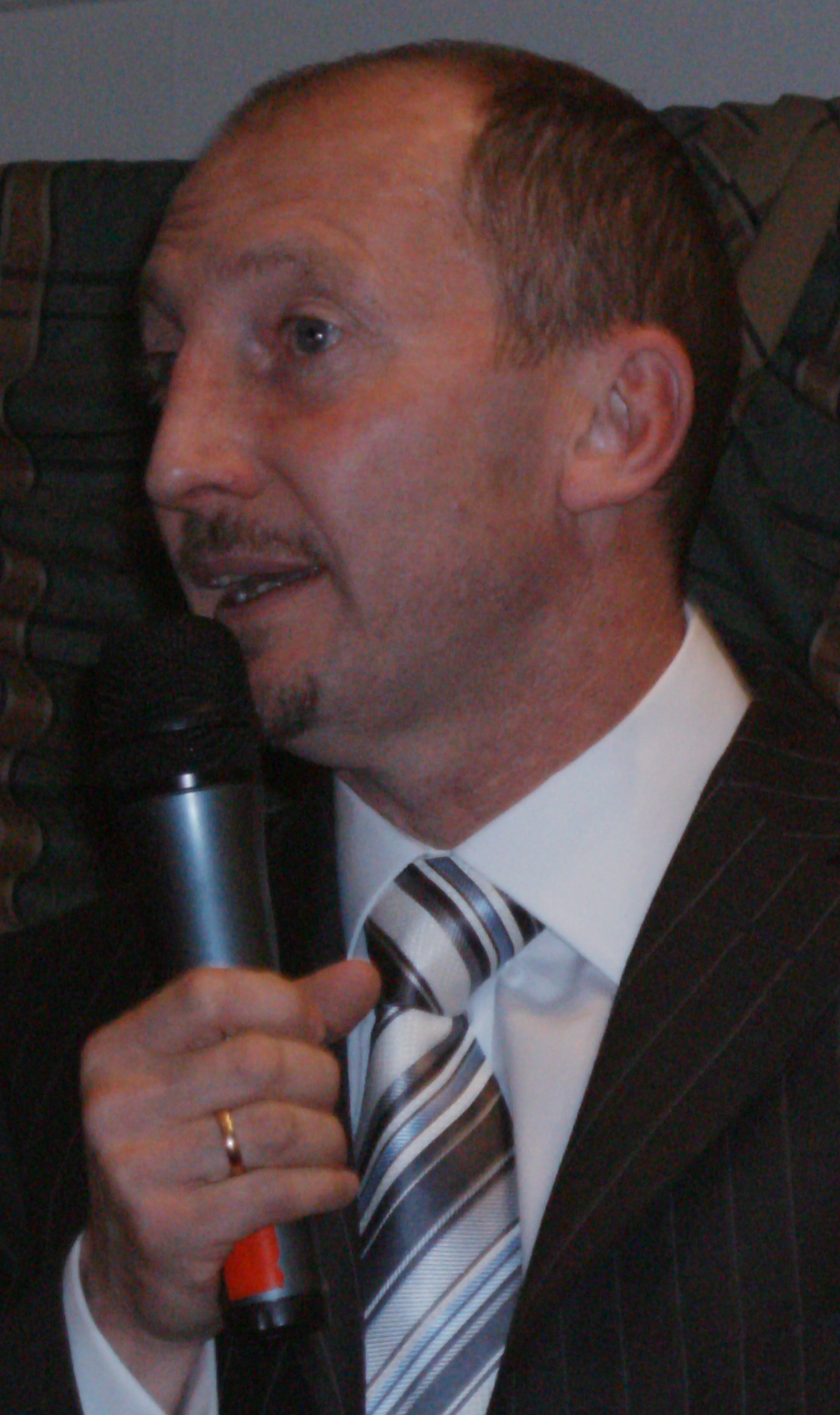
Ian Holloway's side finished 11th in the Championship in 2007.

As of 20 January 2026. Only permanent managers are listed.

Name^{[A]}	Nationality	From	To	P	W	D	L	Win %	Achievements	Notes	Refs^{[B]}
Frank Brettell	England	1 August 1903	31 May 1905	115	57	27	31	49.57	1 Western League title	^{[C]}	
Bob Jack	Scotland	1 August 1905	31 May 1906	57	25	16	16	43.86	—	^{[D]}	
William Fullarton	Scotland	1 August 1906	31 May 1907	49	15	15	19	30.61	—	—	
Committee	—	1 August 1907	31 May 1910	151	63	36	52	41.72	—	^{[E]}	
Bob Jack	Scotland	1 August 1910	31 May 1938	1,036	483	248	305	46.62	1 Southern League title 1 Third Division South title	^{[D]}^{[F]}^{[G]}	
Jack Tresadern	England	1 August 1938	31 August 1947	89	29	13	47	32.58	—	^{[H]}	
Jimmy Rae	Scotland	1 September 1947	31 January 1955	297	112	78	107	37.71	1 Third Division South title	^{[D]}^{[I]}	
Jack Rowley	England	1 February 1955	1 March 1960	238	93	52	93	39.08	1 Third Division title	^{[D]}^{[J]}	
Neil Dougall	Scotland	1 March 1960	1 November 1961	77	32	16	29	41.56	—	^{[D]}	
Ellis Stuttard	England	1 November 1961	1 October 1963	84	29	22	33	34.52	—	^{[D]}	
Andy Beattie	Scotland	1 October 1963	1 May 1964	34	8	13	13	23.53	—	—	
Malcolm Allison	England	1 May 1964	30 April 1965	42	16	8	18	38.10	—	—	
Derek Ufton	England	1 May 1965	1 February 1968	111	31	28	52	27.93	—	—	
Billy Bingham	Northern Ireland	1 February 1968	1 March 1970	98	34	25	39	34.69	—	—	
Ellis Stuttard	England	1 March 1970	1 October 1972	116	39	34	43	33.62	—	^{[D]}^{[F]}	
Tony Waiters	England	11 October 1972	21 April 1977	206	79	56	71	38.35	1 Third Division promotion	^{[K]}	
Mike Kelly	England	1 May 1977	14 February 1978	32	6	10	16	18.75	—	—	
Malcolm Allison	England	16 March 1978	5 January 1979	34	12	12	10	35.29	—	^{[F]}	
Bobby Saxton	England	5 January 1979	31 May 1981	116	43	32	41	37.07	—	^{[D]}	
Bobby Moncur	Scotland	1 June 1981	30 September 1983	99	39	21	39	39.39	—	—	
Johnny Hore	England	1 October 1983	19 October 1984	60	17	16	27	28.33	—	^{[D]}	
Dave Smith	Scotland	1 November 1984	30 June 1988	184	78	43	63	42.39	1 Third Division promotion	^{[L]}	
Ken Brown	England	6 July 1988	6 February 1990	85	26	20	39	30.59	—	—	
David Kemp	England	1 March 1990	28 February 1992	102	29	33	40	28.43	—	^{[D]}	
Peter Shilton	England	2 March 1992	11 January 1995	151	62	31	58	41.06	—	^{[D]}	
Steve McCall	England	11 January 1995	29 March 1995	15	3	3	9	20.00	—	^{[D]}	
Neil Warnock	England	22 June 1995	3 February 1997	88	35	24	29	39.77	1 Third Division promotion	^{[M]}	
Mick Jones	England	3 February 1997	21 June 1998	68	17	22	29	25.00	—	—	
Kevin Hodges	England	21 June 1998	4 October 2000	123	39	38	46	31.71	—	^{[D]}	
Paul Sturrock	Scotland	31 October 2000	4 March 2004	178	85	47	46	47.75	1 Third Division title 1 Second Division title	^{[N]}	
Bobby Williamson	Scotland	20 April 2004	6 September 2005	58	19	12	27	32.76	—	^{[O]}	
Tony Pulis	Wales	23 September 2005	14 June 2006	39	12	15	12	30.77	—	—	
Ian Holloway	England	28 June 2006	21 November 2007	71	28	23	20	39.44	—	—	
Paul Sturrock	Scotland	27 November 2007	10 December 2009	99	28	22	49	28.28	—	^{[F]}	
Paul Mariner	England	10 December 2009	6 May 2010	28	7	6	15	25.00	—	^{[D]}	
Peter Reid	England	24 June 2010	18 September 2011	61	16	9	36	26.23	—	—	
Carl Fletcher	Wales	19 September 2011	1 January 2013	70	17	27	26	24.29	—	^{[D]}	
John Sheridan	Ireland	6 January 2013	28 May 2015	126	48	31	47	38.10	—	—	
Derek Adams	Scotland	11 June 2015	28 April 2019	213	92	43	78	43.19	1 League Two Runner Up	—	
Ryan Lowe	England	5 June 2019	7 December 2021	128	57	27	44	44.53	1 League Two Promotion	—	
Steven Schumacher	England	7 December 2021	19 December 2023	108	60	18	30	55.56	1 League One title	—	
Ian Foster	England	7 January 2024	1 April 2024	17	4	4	9	23.53	-	—	
Wayne Rooney	England	25 May 2024	31 December 2024	25	5	6	14	20.00	-	—	
Miron Muslic	Bosnia and Herzegovina	5 January 2025	31 May 2025	23	8	5	10	34.78	-	—	
Tom Cleverley	England	13 June 2025	Present	53	25	7	21	47.17	-	—	

-

== Footnotes ==
A.: Managers are listed in chronological order. Caretakers are not included.
B.: Statistics are sourced to Danes (2009), Complete Record, up to and including the 2008–09 season, and to Soccerbase thereafter.
C.: Bretell won the Western League title in 1905.
D. ^{a} ^{b} ^{c} ^{d} ^{e} ^{f} ^{g} ^{h} ^{i} ^{j} ^{k} ^{l} ^{m} ^{n} : Managers who also played for the club competitively.
E.: The club chose to operate with a committee between 1907 and 1910.
F. ^{a} ^{b} ^{c} ^{d} : Managers who returned for a second term.
G.: Jack won the Southern League in 1913, and Third Division South in 1930.
H.: Matches played in the abandoned 1939–40 season and subsequent wartime competitions, including the 1945–46 Football League season, are generally not included by football statisticians.
I.: Rae won the Third Division South title in the 1951–52 season.
J.: Rowley won the Third Division title in the 1958–59 season.
K.: Waiters won promotion from the Third Division in the 1974–75 season.
L.: Smith won promotion from the Third Division in the 1985–86 season.
M.: Warnock won promotion from the Third Division via the play-offs in the 1995–96 season.
N.: Sturrock won the Third Division in 2002, and the Second Division in 2004.
O.: Williamson achieved the unlikely feat of winning a league title in his first game as manager. He succeeded Paul Sturrock, who was in charge for 34 league games that season.
P.: Win / Draw / Loss Updated following the game on 11 August 2018
