= Archie Gorman =

Scottish footballer

Personal information
- Full name: Archibald Macdonald Gorman
- Date of birth: 10 April 1909
- Place of birth: Lochore, Scotland
- Date of death: 18 September 1992 (aged 83)
- Place of death: Tavistock, England
- Height: 5 ft 7 in (1.70 m)
- Position: Wing half

Senior career*
Years	Team	Apps	(Gls)
19??–1931	Edinburgh City	?	(?)
1931–1946	Plymouth Argyle	237	(2)
Total		237+	(2+)
- * Club domestic league appearances and goals

Archibald Macdonald Gorman (10 April 1909 – 18 September 1992) was a Scottish footballer who played as a wing half.

Born in Lochore, he was a modern-day holding midfielder. Gorman began his career with Edinburgh City before being signed by fellow Scotsman Bob Jack for Plymouth Argyle in 1931.

Regarded as a tenacious tackler, his energy and determination was a big feature of the Pilgrims team in the 1930s, along with the attacking prowess of Jack Leslie and Sammy Black. His Football League career with the club was ended by the Second World War, but Gorman returned to assist the team rebuild after the war as player coach.

Gorman died in Tavistock, Devon, in 1992 at the age of 83.
