= Jack Vidler =

English footballer

Personal information
- Full name: Horace Jack Vidler
- Date of birth: 13 June 1905
- Place of birth: Portsmouth, England
- Date of death: 1953 (aged 47–48)
- Height: 5 ft 9 in (1.75 m)
- Position: Forward

Senior career*
Years	Team	Apps	(Gls)
1929–1939	Plymouth Argyle	242	(95)
1939	Bristol City	3	(0)
Total		245	(95)
- * Club domestic league appearances and goals

Horace Jack Vidler (13 June 1905 – 1953) was an English footballer who played as a forward.

== Career ==
Described as a bustling forward, Vidler joined Football League club Plymouth Argyle in 1929. He made his first appearance for the club against Southend United on 2 March 1929, scoring his first goal in his third appearance, on the opening day of the 1929–30 season. Vidler established himself as a first-team regular that season, scoring 19 goals in just 31 appearances, including two hat-tricks and a four-goal haul against Norwich City on 19 April 1930.

Vidler clearly benefited from the time he spent serving the British Army as a teenager, using his strength and agility to great effect on the pitch. He is considered to be among the best to have worn the colours of Plymouth Argyle, and played alongside fellow greats such as Sammy Black, Jack Leslie, and Ray Bowden. His first and only major honour with the club came in his first full season when the club won the Football League Third Division South title and promotion to the Second Division, where he would continue to play for the next nine years.

He played his final game for the club against Sheffield United on 4 February 1939. In 256 appearances he scored 103 goals, which puts him sixth on the club's all-time goalscorers list. He was transferred to Bristol City in the summer of 1939 at the age of 33, before his career was cut short by the outbreak of the Second World War.

== Honours ==
- Football League Third Division South

Winner (1): 1929–30
