= Sunday Independent =

Sunday Independent may refer to several newspapers:

- Sunday Independent (Western Australia)
- Sunday Independent (South Africa)
- Sunday Independent (England), in south-west England, UK
- Sunday Independent (Ireland), in Ireland

== See also ==
- The Independent on Sunday, a national newspaper in the UK
