= Jimmy Raye =

Jimmy Raye may refer to:

- Jimmy Raye II, American football coach, former Offensive Coordinator of San Francisco 49ers
- Jimmy Raye III, son of Jimmy Raye II, current director of player personnel with Indianapolis Colts

== See also ==
- Jimmy Rae (1907–1958), Scottish footballer
- Jimmy Ray (born 1970, English singer
