= List of EFL Trophy finals =

- Founded: 1983
- Region: England; Wales
- Teams: 48
- Current champions: Luton Town (2nd title)
- Most championships: Bristol City; Peterborough United (3 titles each)

The EFL Trophy is a knockout cup competition in English football organised by and named after the English Football League. The competition was first played in 1983–84 as the Associate Members' Cup. It is currently open to the 48 members of League One and League Two with 16 category one academy teams from clubs in the Premier League and Championship being invited. In 1984 the final was due to be played at the then Wembley Stadium, but owing to damage caused to the pitch during the Horse of the Year Show, it was moved to Boothferry Park. The first final to be played at Wembley Stadium was in 1985. From 2001 to 2007 while Wembley was rebuilt, it was played at the Millennium Stadium in Cardiff. In 2008 the finals returned to the new Wembley.

== Finals ==
Key

	Match went to extra time
	Match decided by golden goal
	Match decided by a penalty shoot-out after extra time
	Club played in tier 4 (Fourth Division/Third Division/League Two) at the time
	Club was reinstated at an earlier stage of the same competition
**Bold Italics**	Club was reinstated in the final stage of the same competition
**Bold**	Club was promoted to the second-tier of English football
Italics	Club was relegated to the fifth-tier of English football

All teams are English, except where marked (Wales) (Welsh).

Final	Winners	Score	Runners-up	Venue	Attendance^{[B]}	Winning manager
1984	Bournemouth	2–1	Hull City	Boothferry Park	6,544	(England) Harry Redknapp
1985	Wigan Athletic	3–1	Brentford	Wembley Stadium (original)	39,897	(Northern Ireland) Bryan Hamilton
1986	Bristol City	3–0	Bolton Wanderers	Wembley Stadium (original)	54,502	(England) Terry Cooper
1987	Mansfield Town	1–1	Bristol City	Wembley Stadium (original)	58,586	(England) Ian Greaves
1988	Wolverhampton Wanderers	2–0	Burnley	Wembley Stadium (original)	80,841	(England) Graham Turner
1989	Bolton Wanderers	4–1	Torquay United	Wembley Stadium (original)	46,513	(England) Phil Neal
1990	Tranmere Rovers	2–1	**Bristol Rovers**	Wembley Stadium (original)	48,402	(England) John King
1991	Birmingham City	3–2	**Tranmere Rovers**	Wembley Stadium (original)	58,750	(Scotland) Lou Macari
1992	Stoke City	1–0	Stockport County	Wembley Stadium (original)	48,339	(Scotland) Lou Macari
1993	Port Vale	2–1	Stockport County	Wembley Stadium (original)	35,885	(England) John Rudge
1994	(Wales) Swansea City	1–1	Huddersfield Town	Wembley Stadium (original)	47,773	(Scotland) Frank Burrows
1995	**Birmingham City**	1–0	Carlisle United	Wembley Stadium (original)	76,663	(England) Barry Fry
1996	Rotherham United	2–1	Shrewsbury Town	Wembley Stadium (original)	35,235	(Scotland) Archie Gemmill (Scotland) John McGovern
1997	Carlisle United	0–0	Colchester United	Wembley Stadium (original)	45,077	(England) Mervyn Day
1998	**Grimsby Town**	2–1	Bournemouth	Wembley Stadium (original)	62,432	(England) Alan Buckley
1999	Wigan Athletic	1–0	Millwall	Wembley Stadium (original)	55,349	(England) Ray Mathias
2000	Stoke City	2–1	Bristol City	Wembley Stadium (original)	75,057	(Iceland) Guðjón Þórðarson
2001	Port Vale	2–1	Brentford	Millennium Stadium	25,654	(England) Brian Horton
2002	Blackpool	4–1	Cambridge United	Millennium Stadium	20,287	(England) Steve McMahon
2003	Bristol City	2–0	Carlisle United	Millennium Stadium	50,913	(Northern Ireland) Danny Wilson
2004	Blackpool	2–0	Southend United	Millennium Stadium	34,031	(England) Steve McMahon
2005	(Wales) Wrexham	2–0	Southend United	Millennium Stadium	36,216	(England) Denis Smith
2006	(Wales) Swansea City	2–1	Carlisle United	Millennium Stadium	42,028	(Wales) Kenny Jackett
2007	Doncaster Rovers	3–2	Bristol Rovers	Millennium Stadium	59,024	(England) Sean O'Driscoll
2008	Milton Keynes Dons	2–0	Grimsby Town	Wembley Stadium (new)	56,618	(England) Paul Ince
2009	Luton Town	3–2	**Scunthorpe United**	Wembley Stadium (new)	55,378	(England) Mick Harford
2010	Southampton	4–1	Carlisle United	Wembley Stadium (new)	73,476	(England) Alan Pardew
2011	Carlisle United	1–0	Brentford	Wembley Stadium (new)	40,476	(England) Greg Abbott
2012	Chesterfield	2–0	Swindon Town	Wembley Stadium (new)	49,602	(Republic of Ireland) John Sheridan
2013	Crewe Alexandra	2–0	Southend United	Wembley Stadium (new)	43,842	(England) Steve Davis
2014	Peterborough United	3–1	Chesterfield	Wembley Stadium (new)	35,663	(Scotland) Darren Ferguson
2015	**Bristol City**	2–0	Walsall	Wembley Stadium (new)	72,315	(England) Steve Cotterill
2016	**Barnsley**	3–2	Oxford United	Wembley Stadium (new)	59,230	(England) Paul Heckingbottom
2017	Coventry City	2–1	Oxford United	Wembley Stadium (new)	74,434	(England) Mark Robins
2018	Lincoln City	1–0	Shrewsbury Town	Wembley Stadium (new)	41,261	(England) Danny Cowley
2019	Portsmouth	2–2	Sunderland	Wembley Stadium (new)	85,021	(Wales) Kenny Jackett
2020^{Note 1}	Salford City	0–0	Portsmouth	Wembley Stadium (new)	0	(England) Richie Wellens
2021	Sunderland	1–0	Tranmere Rovers	Wembley Stadium (new)	0	(England) Lee Johnson
2022	**Rotherham United**	4–2	Sutton United	Wembley Stadium (new)	30,688	(England) Paul Warne
2023	Bolton Wanderers	4–0	Plymouth Argyle	Wembley Stadium (new)	79,389	(England) Ian Evatt
2024	Peterborough United	2–1	Wycombe Wanderers	Wembley Stadium (new)	42,252	(Scotland) Darren Ferguson
2025	Peterborough United	2–0	**Birmingham City**	Wembley Stadium (new)	71,722	(Scotland) Darren Ferguson
2026	Luton Town	3–1	Stockport County	Wembley Stadium (new)	49,517	(England) Jack Wilshere

^1 Final completely delayed from the original date of 4 April 2020 to 13 March 2021 due to the COVID-19 pandemic in the United Kingdom.

== Results by team ==
Teams in bold compete outside EFL Leagues One and Two as of 2025–26 season and hence they do not compete in the EFL Trophy (some Premier League and Championship teams may enter their reserve/academic/youth teams, but none of them have made a final so far and a win by any such team will not count as a full-team club record).

EFL Trophy winners by team
Team	Winners	Runners-up	Years won	Years runners-up
**Bristol City**	3	2	1986, 2003, 2015	1987, 2000
Peterborough United	3	0	2014, 2024, 2025	—
**Carlisle United**	2	4	1997, 2011	1995, 2003, 2006, 2010
Bolton Wanderers	2	1	1989, 2023	1986
**Birmingham City**	2	1	1991, 1995	2025
Blackpool	2	0	2002, 2004	—
Luton Town	2	0	2009, 2026	—
Port Vale	2	0	1993, 2001	—
Rotherham United	2	0	1996, 2022	—
**Stoke City**	2	0	1992, 2000	—
(Wales) **Swansea City**	2	0	1994, 2006	—
Wigan Athletic	2	0	1985, 1999	—
Tranmere Rovers	1	2	1990	1991, 2021
**Bournemouth**	1	1	1984	1998
**Chesterfield**	1	1	2012	2014
Grimsby Town	1	1	1998	2008
Portsmouth	1	1	2019	2020
**Sunderland**	1	1	2021	2019
Barnsley	1	0	2016	—
**Coventry City**	1	0	2017	—
Crewe Alexandra	1	0	2013	—
Doncaster Rovers	1	0	2007	—
Lincoln City	1	0	2018	—
Mansfield Town	1	0	1987	—
Milton Keynes Dons	1	0	2008	—
Salford City	1	0	2020	—
**Southampton**	1	0	2010	—
**Wolverhampton Wanderers**	1	0	1988	—
(Wales) **Wrexham**	1	0	2005	—
**Brentford**	0	3	—	1985, 2001, 2011
**Southend United**	0	3	—	2004, 2005, 2013
Stockport County	0	3	—	1992, 1993, 2026
Bristol Rovers	0	2	—	1990, 2007
**Oxford United**	0	2	—	2016, 2017
Shrewsbury Town	0	2	—	1996, 2018
**Burnley**	0	1	—	1988
Cambridge United	0	1	—	2002
Colchester United	0	1	—	1997
Huddersfield Town	0	1	—	1994
**Hull City**	0	1	—	1984
**Millwall**	0	1	—	1999
**Scunthorpe United**	0	1	—	2009
**Sutton United**	0	1	—	2022
Plymouth Argyle	0	1	—	2023
Swindon Town	0	1	―	2012
**Torquay United**	0	1	—	1989
Walsall	0	1	—	2015
Wycombe Wanderers	0	1	—	2024
