= Sir John Hawkins Square =

Public square in Plymouth, England

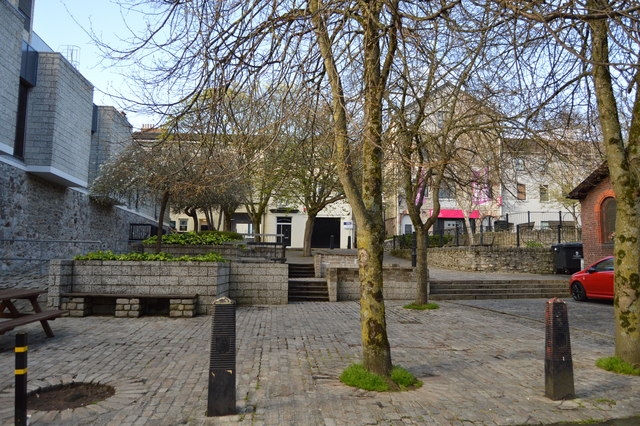
- Interactive map of Sir John Hawkins Square
- Namesake: Sir John Hawkins
- Location: Plymouth, England
- Postal code: PL1
- Coordinates: 50.369109°N 4.1389223°W

Sir John Hawkins Square is a public square located in Plymouth, England. The square is dedicated to naval commander Sir John Hawkins.

== Location ==
The Square lies between the City Centre and the Barbican, between Higher Lane and Palace Street, with Lower Lane running directly into it, and is overshadowed by Plymouth Magistrates' Court.

Within close proximity of the Square there are two pubs: The Swan and Kitty O'Hanlons; as well as The Merchant's House Museum, a Restaurant, the dBs Music College, and a Plymouth College of Art studio. There are no residential properties on the Square.

== Renaming ==
The square gained media attention in June 2020 during the George Floyd protests in the United Kingdom, due to Hawkins' connection to the Transatlantic slave trade. Plymouth City Council announced plans to rename the square. On 18 June 2020, Plymouth Council proposed that the square be renamed Jack Leslie Square after Jack Leslie, who would have become the first black football player to represent England internationally. The decision became the subject of a legal challenge in August 2020. On 4 December 2020, a court rejected the attempt to prevent the change of name. On 8 November 2023, a proposal was announced to rename the square to Justice Square.
