= Kevin Hodges =

English football player and manager (born 1960)

Personal information
- Full name: Kevin Hodges
- Date of birth: 12 June 1960 (age 66)
- Place of birth: Bridport, England
- Height: 5 ft 8 in (1.73 m)
- Positions: Midfielder; winger

Youth career
- 1975–1978: AFC Bournemouth

Senior career*
Years	Team	Apps	(Gls)
1978–1992	Plymouth Argyle	530	(81)
1992	→ Torquay United (loan)	3	(0)
1992–1997	Torquay United	65	(4)
Total		598	(85)

Managerial career
- 1996–1998: Torquay United
- 1998–2000: Plymouth Argyle
- 2004–2005: Clevedon Town
- * Club domestic league appearances and goals

Kevin Hodges (born 12 June 1960) is an English retired football player and manager who played as a midfielder, and now works as assistant manager at Dorchester Town. He spent the majority of his playing career with Plymouth Argyle of the Football League, where he is the club's all-time appearance record holder. He also played for Torquay United and went on to become their manager before returning to Plymouth Argyle as manager. After a period in coaching roles elsewhere, he returned to work for Plymouth Argyle where he is currently responsible for managing the youth team.

== Playing career ==
A winger, Hodges began his career as a schoolboy with local club AFC Bournemouth. He appeared for them in the FA Youth Cup as a 15-year-old before the club scrapped its youth team in 1978 as part of a cost-cutting exercise. He followed one of his former coaches, Bobby Howe, to Plymouth Argyle to sign his first professional contract. He would go on to represent the club with distinction for the next fourteen years, making a total of 620 appearances in all competitions, scoring 87 goals. He is recognised as one of Plymouth Argyle's best wingers of all time.

Hodges is the club's all-time appearance record holder and eighth on the all-time goalscoring record list. He was a member of the Argyle squad which reached the semi-finals of the FA Cup in 1984. His best campaign came in the 1985–86 season under Dave Smith when the club won promotion from the Third Division. Hodges started in all 46 matches and scored 16 goals, an impressive return for a midfielder. In recognition of his performances that year, he won the club's Player of the Year award.

His service to the club was rewarded early on in the 1987–88 season when a testimonial match was played in his honour against the club he supported as a child, West Ham United. Hodges became one of the few players to ever receive a second testimonial match in 1992, against Luton Town, after fifteen years of service to the club. He was loaned to Torquay United in January 1992, with first-team opportunities being limited at Home Park, to help the Gulls in their battle against relegation back to the fourth-tier of English football. Hodges' final game for Plymouth Argyle came in the Second Division on 20 November 1992, as a substitute against Stockport County at Edgeley Park. He was then allowed to rejoin Torquay United on a permanent basis in December 1992, thus ending his fourteen-year association with the Pilgrims. He finished his playing career at Plainmoor, scoring 5 goals in 81 appearances before officially retiring in 1997, to focus on coaching.

== Managerial career ==
Having initially been a player-coach and then youth-team manager at Torquay United, Hodges replaced Eddie May as first-team manager in the summer of 1996. He guided them to the Third Division Play-off Final in 1998, before returning to Home Park that summer to take up the position of Plymouth Argyle manager, replacing Mick Jones. His stint as the club's manager was extremely different from his time as a player. The club were in the bottom division of the Football League, one which it was unaccustomed to, yet rather than bounce back up the club achieved mediocre league positions of thirteenth in 1999 and twelfth in 2000. The beginning of the 2000–01 season saw Hodges having to work with a tight budget and a team that needed rebuilding. After losing six of their first ten league games that season, Hodges' reign was brought to an end, and he was replaced by Paul Sturrock.

Following his dismissal, Hodges spent some time scouting for Wolverhampton Wanderers before being appointed as a Football Development Officer for the Somerset FA, a role which he continued to honour after being appointed as manager of Clevedon Town in September 2004. He left in October 2005, with the club top of the Southern League Western Division, to become an assistant manager to Steven Thompson at Football League One club Yeovil Town. He remained at Huish Park until the appointment of Russell Slade as the club's manager, and then joined Bristol Rovers in October 2006 as the club's youth-team manager. Hodges spell with them lasted until June 2008 when he was released from his contract. The decision was made after the club decided to withdraw its youth team from the Football Combination. Hodges returned to Plymouth Argyle again in October 2008 to work as a part-time coach for the club's Football in the Community Trust project. In September 2010, he assumed responsibility for coaching Argyle's under 18's.

He left his role as Plymouth Argyle's academy director in November 2019.
