= Wilf Carter (footballer) =

English footballer

Personal information
- Full name: Wilfred Carter
- Date of birth: 4 October 1933
- Place of birth: Wednesbury, England
- Date of death: 4 August 2013 (aged 79)
- Place of death: Bath, England
- Position: Forward

Senior career*
Years	Team	Apps	(Gls)
1951–1957	West Bromwich Albion	57	(12)
1957–1964	Plymouth Argyle	254	(134)
1964–1966	Exeter City	48	(6)
1966–1970	Bath City		

Managerial career
- 1972–1974: Salisbury
- * Club domestic league appearances and goals

Wilfred Carter (4 October 1933 – 4 August 2013) was an English footballer who played as a forward. He played in the Football League for West Bromwich Albion, Plymouth Argyle and Exeter City. Carter could play at inside and centre forward.

Carter was a prolific goalscorer and scored 5 goals in one match on 27 December 1960 for Plymouth Argyle against Charlton Athletic. Carter is second on the all-time list of goalscorers for Plymouth Argyle, scoring 134 goals in league matches and 148 goals in all matches.

After the end of his playing career, he managed Salisbury in the Southern League between 1972 and 1974.

Carter died of cancer on 4 August 2013.
