= Pat Jones (footballer, born 1920) =

English footballer

Personal information
- Full name: Patrick James Jones
- Date of birth: 7 September 1920
- Place of birth: Plymouth, England
- Date of death: December 1990 (aged 70)
- Position: Full back

Senior career*
Years	Team	Apps	(Gls)
1946–1957	Plymouth Argyle	425	(2)
- * Club domestic league appearances and goals

Patrick James Jones (7 September 1920 – December 1990) was a former English professional footballer who played as a full back.

== Playing career ==
Jones began his career with Astor Institute in the Plymouth area but had to wait until 1947 to play for Football League Second Division club Plymouth Argyle due to the Second World War. He made his debut against Coventry City in May 1947 and would go on to virtually monopolize the left back position for the following 10 years. Described as consistent, reliable, and honest, Jones would go on to make 441 appearances for the Pilgrims in all competitions, scoring two goals. After a distinguished career with the club, he moved into non-league football with St Austell at the age of 37. During the Sixties he ran a fish and chip shop at Challaborough near Plymouth. Little else is known about him after his retirement.

== Honours ==
Football League Third Division South

- Winner (1): 1951–52
