= Ellis Stuttard =

English footballer

Personal information
- Date of birth: 24 April 1920
- Place of birth: Padiham, England
- Date of death: 1983 (aged 62–63)
- Position: Full back

Senior career*
Years	Team	Apps	(Gls)
1937–1938	Burnley	0	(0)
1938–1947	Plymouth Argyle	29	(1)
1947–1951	Torquay United	82	(0)
Total		111	(1)

Managerial career
- 1961–1963: Plymouth Argyle
- 1965–1966: Exeter City
- 1970–1972: Plymouth Argyle
- * Club domestic league appearances and goals

John Ellis Stuttard (24 April 1920 – 1983) was an English professional footballer who played as a full back. After retiring, he had spells as manager of Plymouth Argyle and Exeter City.
