= Jimmy Rae =

Scottish footballer and manager (1907–1958)

Personal information
- Full name: James Clarkson Rae
- Date of birth: 22 November 1907
- Place of birth: Skinflats, Scotland
- Date of death: 4 July 1958 (aged 50)
- Place of death: Solihull, England
- Height: 6 ft 0 in (1.83 m)
- Position: Full back

Senior career*
Years	Team	Apps	(Gls)
1925–1929	King's Park	145	(3)
1929–1932	Partick Thistle	88	(2)
1932–1939	Plymouth Argyle	246	(0)
Total		479	(5)

Managerial career
- 1948–1955: Plymouth Argyle
- * Club domestic league appearances and goals

James Clarkson Rae (22 November 1907 – 4 July 1958) was a Scottish professional footballer and manager who most famously played for and then became manager of English Football League club Plymouth Argyle. He was a full back and also represented King's Park and Partick Thistle in Scotland.

== Playing career ==
Jimmy Rae was one of eleven men who both played for and managed Plymouth Argyle. His career as a footballer began when he was 17 years old, signing for King's Park as a left-footed full back. He joined Partick Thistle in 1929 and went on to make 119 appearances in all competitions for them, most notably in the 1930 Scottish Cup Final, which was won by Rangers after a replay at Hampden Park.

His performances for Thistle made him a target for the Glasgow giants, but Plymouth Argyle manager Bob Jack secured Rae's services in 1932 (along with forward John Simpson) after Partick played a benefit match at Home Park. He made his debut in August 1932 and immediately became a first-team regular. He went on to make 249 League appearances and ten FA Cup appearances, missing only a handful of games in seven years with the club, where he made up an all-Scottish left side with Archie Gorman and Sammy Black. When war intervened in 1939, Rae continued to play for Argyle in wartime competitions, bringing his total of club appearances to 283.

Rae played for Scotland Schoolboys and caught the attention of the senior national team selectors on many occasions during his professional career, being called up to the stand-by list three times, but he never won a full international cap.

== Managerial career ==
When hostilities had ended in 1945 he was appointed as assistant to Argyle manager Jack Tresadern as the Football League resumed. He took over as Plymouth Argyle manager in November 1947, a position he held for eight years. He won the Third Division South title in 1952 and led the club to their joint highest League finish of 4th in the Second Division the following year. He was relieved of his duties as manager midway through the 1954–55 season due to downturn in results, but left a lasting legacy as one of the club's best managers. He was responsible for signing players of the calibre of Jack Chisholm, Neil Dougall and Gordon Astall.

== Later life and death ==
Following his dismissal, he left Plymouth to manage a pub in Solihull, but died in July 1958.

== Honours ==
Plymouth Argyle

- Football League Third Division South: 1951–52

Partick Thistle

- Scottish Cup: runner-up 1929–30
