= Johnny Williams (footballer, born 1935) =

English footballer

Personal information
- Full name: John Stanley James Williams
- Date of birth: 16 August 1935
- Place of birth: Bristol, England
- Date of death: 24 November 2011 (aged 76)
- Place of death: Plymouth, England
- Position: Wing half

Senior career*
Years	Team	Apps	(Gls)
1955–1966	Plymouth Argyle	412	(48)
1966–1969	Bristol Rovers	69	(10)
- Bodmin Town
Total		481	(58)

Managerial career
- Bodmin Town
- Falmouth Town
- * Club domestic league appearances and goals

John Stanley James "Johnny" Williams (16 August 1935 – 24 November 2011) was an English footballer who played as a wing half. He played in the Football League for Plymouth Argyle and Bristol Rovers, amassing 481 appearances over a 14-year period.

== Playing career ==
Williams began his career as a professional in 1955 with then Football League Second Division club Plymouth Argyle, making his debut in the 1–0 win against Blackburn Rovers at Home Park on 10 September 1955. He would go on to establish himself as one of the club's best players of the post-war era. Williams was best known for his shooting ability. A strong tackler and powerful runner, Williams undoubtedly benefited from his service in the National Army where he played alongside future World Cup winner Bobby Charlton.

Many people thought Williams was capable of playing at the highest level and even gain international recognition but he stayed faithful to the Pilgrims. Spending most of that time in the Second Division, aside from three seasons in the Third Division where he won the title with the club in 1959. In all, he made 448 appearances for Plymouth Argyle, scoring 55 goals, before he went back to his hometown to see out his career with Bristol Rovers. He spent three seasons there, making 69 appearances, before retiring from the professional game at 33. In 2004, Williams was named in Plymouth Argyle's team of the century after a vote by the club's supporters.

== Later life ==
Following his retirement, Williams went into coaching. He became player-manager at Cornish side Bodmin Town before moving on to Falmouth Town, where he managed the club to considerable success. He returned to Plymouth Argyle in 1969 to assist manager Billy Bingham. When Bingham was relieved of his duties, Williams left the club by mutual consent to focus on his garage business. Williams died on 24 November 2011 at the age of 76.

== Honours ==
Plymouth Argyle

- Football League Third Division winner: 1958–59
