= Jack Leslie (English footballer) =

English footballer (1901–1988)

Personal information
- Full name: John Francis Leslie
- Date of birth: 17 August 1901
- Place of birth: Canning Town, England
- Date of death: 25 November 1988 (aged 87)
- Position: Inside left

Senior career*
| Years | Team | Apps | (Gls) |
| 1919–1921 | Barking Town | | |
| 1921–1935 | Plymouth Argyle | 384 | (133) |
- * Club domestic league appearances and goals

John Francis Leslie (17 August 1901 – 25 November 1988) was an English professional footballer who played as an inside left.

Leslie was the only Black professional player in England during his time with Plymouth Argyle. Leslie enjoyed a 14–season spell with Argyle, having joined the club from Barking Town in 1921. A creator and scorer of goals, his partnership with outside left Sammy Black has gone down in history as one of the very best. Leslie played alongside Black 327 times, with the duo scoring 319 goals between them in all competitions, with Leslie contributing 137 of them. In 1930, The Football Herald described him as "known throughout England for his skill and complexion."

== Early life ==
Leslie was born in Canning Town, London, to a Jamaican father also called John Leslie, a boilermaker, and an English mother, Annie Leslie, a seamstress.

== Career ==
He played for the local team Barking Town, scoring more than 250 goals and helping them win the Essex Senior Cup in 1920 and London League Premier Division title in 1921. Also in 1921 he joined Plymouth Argyle. Predominantly a centre-forward or an inside-left, Leslie was described as being versatile and able to provide cover wherever needed.

It took until his eleventh appearance for Argyle for him to get his first goal, in a 2–0 win against Gillingham in 1923.

Across a total of fourteen seasons at Argyle he scored 133 league goals in 384 games, making him Argyle's ninth record highest appearance maker, and fourth highest goal scorer.

=== England call-up ===
Leslie was called up to the national team in 1925 as a travelling reserve; his manager, Bob Jack, told him he had been selected as a reserve for England against Ireland for an October 1925 Home Nations Championship game. However, the invitation to be a reserve for his country was withdrawn. It has been speculated that this was because of belated objections to his skin colour by members of the FA who had been unaware of his ethnicity, although contemporary evidence suggests that, due to "snobbery", the FA preferred an amateur (Stan Earle) to the professional Leslie as reserve. Later in life, Leslie told the journalist Brian Woolnough: "They must have forgot I was a coloured boy."

Leslie was never picked in any capacity for England again. As a consequence, it was not until 1963 that John Charles became the first Black player to appear in an England shirt when he represented England at under-18 level, and in 1978 Viv Anderson became the first Black player to appear as a full international for the England national football team.

=== Retirement ===
He retired from professional football in 1935, playing his last game, and scoring his last goal, on 29 December 1934 in a 3–1 win against Fulham.

He later worked as a member of the backroom staff of his local club, West Ham United, as the boot-boy. He was offered the job by West Ham manager, Ron Greenwood who recognised Leslie as a great player. During his time at West Ham Leslie cleaned the boots of World Cup winners, Bobby Moore, Geoff Hurst and Martin Peters and of England international Trevor Brooking and Clyde Best who at the time was one of only a very small number of black players in the top flight of English football.

He died in 1988.

== Legacy ==
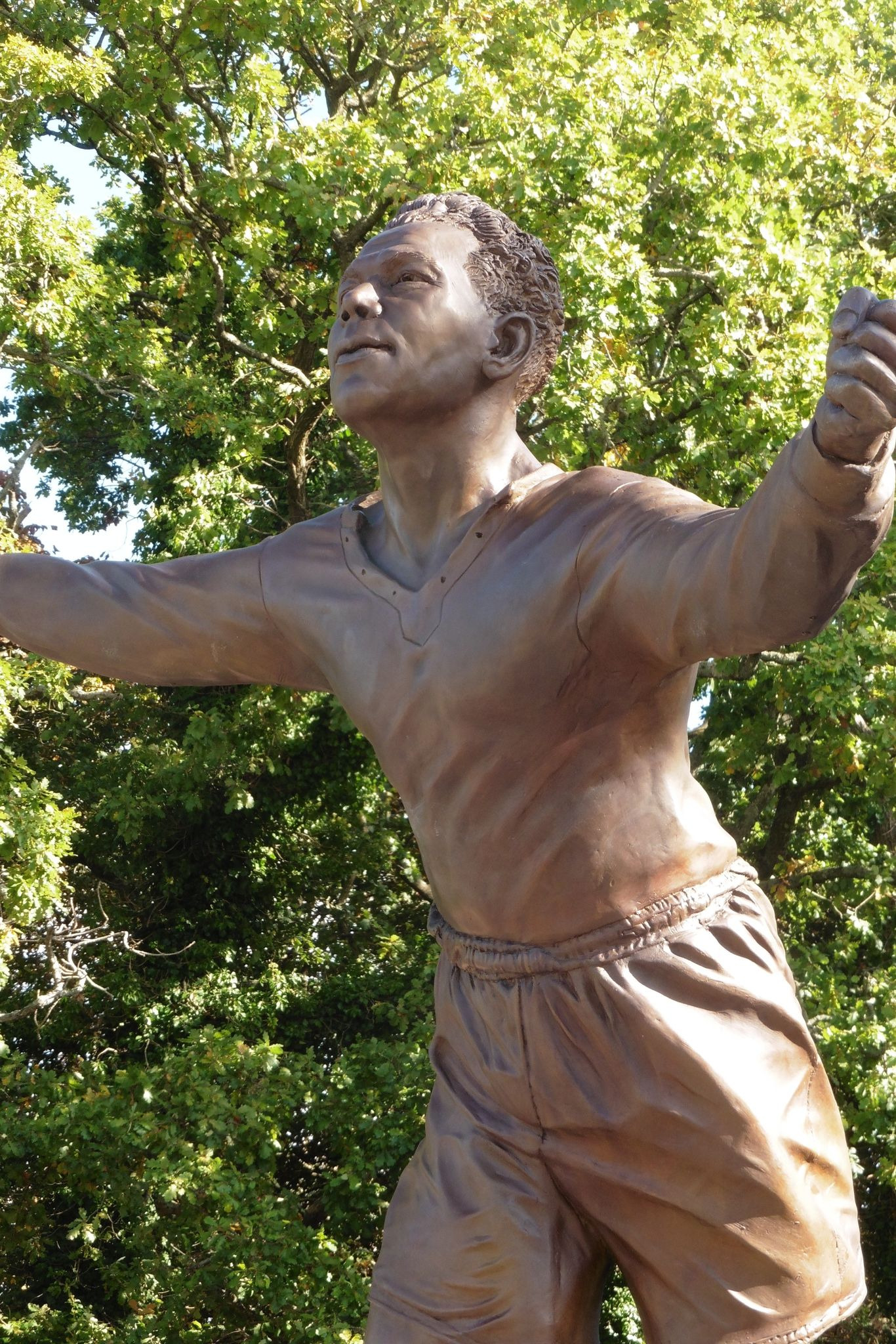
Jack Leslie Statue Plymouth Argyle

In December 2019, the boardroom at the newly redeveloped Mayflower Grandstand at Plymouth Argyle's ground Home Park was named in Leslie's honour.

On 18 June 2020, following the George Floyd protests in the United Kingdom and a petition signed by over 500 people, it was reported that Plymouth City Council had proposed to rename Sir John Hawkins Square in the City Centre to the 'Jack Leslie Square'.

In November 2020, a blue plaque was unveiled outside Leslie's former home in Canning Town.

In August 2022, a previously unnamed road which runs outside Home Park's Devonport End was named Jack Leslie Way.

In early 2020 The Jack Leslie Campaign was set up, with the aim of building a statue of Leslie outside Home Park. Crowd-funding for the project began on 1 July 2020, and by August 2020 had raised the target amount of £100,000.

On 7 October 2022, the commissioned bronze statue of Leslie was unveiled at Home Park. The statue stands 3.7 m (12 ft) tall, and was sculpted by Andy Edwards. A plaque on the statue's base also paid tribute to Leslie's strike-partner Sammy Black, who is Argyle's record top goalscorer.

On the same day, Leslie was awarded a posthumous honorary England cap by the FA. The FA's chair, Debbie Hewitt said in a statement: "the FA is awarding Jack a posthumous honorary cap, to recognise his unique contribution and set of circumstances – and to right the historical wrong." The cap was presented to Leslie's family at Wembley Stadium on 26 March 2023 before England's Euro 2024 qualifying game against Ukraine.

In February 2023 he was inducted into the National Football Museum's Hall of Fame.

On 16 May 2025, Historic England unveiled a blue plaque on the house (in Glendower Road, Plymouth) in Devon where Leslie had lived while captaining Plymouth, acknowledging him as "Captain of Plymouth Argyle FC and the first Black footballer to be selected for England".

== Career statistics ==
Appearances and goals by club, season and competition
| Club | Season | League | | | FA Cup | | Total | |
| Club | Season | Division | Apps | Goals | Apps | Goals | Apps | Goals |
|---|---|---|---|---|---|---|---|---|
| Plymouth Argyle | 1921–22 | Third | 9 | 0 | 0 | 0 | 9 | 0 |
| Plymouth Argyle | 1922–23 | Third | 6 | 3 | 1 | 0 | 7 | 3 |
| Plymouth Argyle | 1923–24 | Third | 17 | 5 | 0 | 0 | 17 | 5 |
| Plymouth Argyle | 1924–25 | Third | 40 | 14 | 1 | 0 | 41 | 14 |
| Plymouth Argyle | 1925–26 | Third | 40 | 17 | 1 | 0 | 41 | 17 |
| Plymouth Argyle | 1926–27 | Third | 33 | 14 | 1 | 0 | 34 | 14 |
| Plymouth Argyle | 1927–28 | Third | 41 | 15 | 1 | 0 | 42 | 15 |
| Plymouth Argyle | 1928–29 | Third | 41 | 21 | 4 | 1 | 45 | 22 |
| Plymouth Argyle | 1929–30 | Third | 32 | 8 | 4 | 1 | 36 | 9 |
| Plymouth Argyle | 1930–31 | Second | 39 | 9 | 1 | 0 | 40 | 9 |
| Plymouth Argyle | 1931–32 | Second | 41 | 20 | 2 | 1 | 43 | 21 |
| Plymouth Argyle | 1932–33 | Second | 33 | 4 | 1 | 1 | 34 | 5 |
| Plymouth Argyle | 1933–34 | Second | 11 | 2 | 0 | 0 | 11 | 2 |
| Plymouth Argyle | 1934–35 | Second | 1 | 1 | 0 | 0 | 1 | 1 |
| Career total | | | 384 | 133 | 17 | 4 | 401 | 137 |

== Honours ==
Plymouth Argyle

- Football League Third Division South: 1929–30

England

- Honorary Cap (posthumous)

== See also ==
- Viv Anderson, who became the first black footballer to play for England, in 1978.
- Mike Trebilcock, who also played for Plymouth Argyle, and was the first black footballer to score in an FA Cup Final.
