= Sunday Independent (England) =

Newspaper published in south-west England

The Sunday Independent was a newspaper originally based in Plymouth, then in Liskeard, and finally in Truro Cornwall. It was published on Sundays throughout South West England. The paper was founded in 1808 and had a circulation of 7,261 in 2003 (last registered figures with the Audit Bureau of Circulations). The newspaper has a convoluted history which has been well documented during its declining years due to several legal disputes involving ex-staff.

Ownership of the paper changed from Newsquest to Tindle Newspaper Group in 2004. In 2014, Tindle Newspapers sold a majority stake of the ownership to retiring Tindle managing director Brian Doel.

On 5 April 2017, it was announced that the paper was to cease publication after 209 years.

Thirteen days later it was then announced that businessman Peter Masters, who at that time was owner of Truro City F.C. and a local caravan park, had purchased the Sunday Independent. Its first edition under this new ownership was run on Sunday 23 April 2017, at the increased price of £1.20.

Masters then pledged to expand a portfolio of additional newspapers across the South West.

However, a few short months later, in January 2018, much to the dismay of his staff, Peter Masters suddenly sold the Sunday Independent Limited, which had employed them, to Plymouth born newspaper executive Duncan Williams for an alleged sum of £1. The transaction has since come under intense scrutiny from journalists of the Sunday Independent Limited, who say that TUPE laws were breached in the process.

Following a lengthy employment tribunal case, involving these 29 ex-journalists, and applications to the High Court to appeal the TUPE transfer liability being shouldered personally by Directors of the Sunday Independent Limited, the Sunday Independent newspaper dropped the pre-fix Sunday and presented itself for a period of months as two simplified rebranded editions calling themselves South West Independent and Cornwall Independent, with the cover price increased once again to £2.00 per unit copy.

During this period the newspaper's reputation, readership figures and advertising revenue had all started to decline.

In January 2022 it was announced in Press Gazette that these Peter Masters owned variants of the Sunday Independent were all to close indefinitely.
