= Sammy Black =

Scottish footballer

Personal information
- Date of birth: 18 October 1905
- Place of birth: Motherwell, Scotland
- Date of death: 1977 (aged 71)
- Place of death: Plymouth, England
- Height: 5 ft 7 in (1.70 m)
- Position: Outside left

Youth career
- –1924: Kirkintilloch Rob Roy

Senior career*
Years	Team	Apps	(Gls)
1924–1938	Plymouth Argyle	470	(174)
1938–1939	Queens Park Rangers	5	(0)
Total		475	(174)
- * Club domestic league appearances and goals

Samuel Black ISM (18 October 1905 – 1977) was a Scottish footballer who played as an outside left.

Often regarded as the greatest player to have represented Plymouth Argyle, he is the club's all-time record scorer with 182 goals. His career began in his native Scotland with Kirkintilloch Rob Roy, where he was spotted by Bob Jack. He moved to Devon in 1924 and became an instant favourite with the club's supporters. His goalscoring ability made him stand out from other wingers and his partnership with inside left Jack Leslie became legendary, as the club challenged for promotion to the First Division during the 1930s. Nicknamed The Mighty Atom, Black was known to play with a cigarette stub tucked behind his ear. He ended his career with Queens Park Rangers and returned to Plymouth during the war to work in the Royal Naval Armaments Depot. He was inducted into the Plymouth Argyle Hall of Fame in 2004.

== Playing career ==
Standing at just five feet six inches tall, Black was the epitome of what a winger was like in the mid-twentieth century. In those days wingers rarely tracked back. They were not expected to do anything other than terrorise full backs. It was Black's eye for goal that made him stand out from other players in his position. He was comfortable using either foot and many of his goals came from unlikely angles with staggering regularity. He began his career with Kirkintilloch Rob Roy, a junior club based in East Dunbartonshire. His performances caught the eye of Bob Jack, a fellow Scot who was manager of Plymouth Argyle. Black joined the club in 1924 and scored on his Football League debut in a 7–1 win against Brentford. His skill on the ball and goalscoring ability made him a darling of the Home Park crowd and he formed a lethal partnership with Jack Leslie; they scored 320 goals between them in all competitions for Argyle. When rumours of interest from other club's surfaced, a Sammy Must Not Go! campaign sparked demonstrations and public meetings; Black was destined to remain as Argyle's talisman.

His last match for the club in January 1938, with Bob Jack still in charge of first team selection but due to retire at the end of the 1937–38 season. Black then joined Queens Park Rangers, having scored 182 goals in 491 appearances for the club. His stay at Loftus Road was ended abruptly by the outbreak of war and he returned to Plymouth having made just five league appearances. To mark Plymouth Argyle's 100th year as a professional club, the club's supporters were asked to vote on who they thought were the best to have represented Argyle during that time. Black was included alongside twelve other people, but he was the only one who played before the war.

== Personal life ==
Black returned to Plymouth when his playing career was brought to an end to work in the Royal Naval Armaments Depot at HMNB Devonport as a storehouse assistant. He continued to live in the city after hostilities had ceased and was awarded the Imperial Service Medal in 1966 for his contribution to the depot. He died in 1977.

== Career statistics ==
Appearances and goals by club, season and competition
Club	Season	League			FA Cup		Total	
Club	Season	Division	Apps	Goals	Apps	Goals	Apps	Goals
Plymouth Argyle	1924–25	Third Division South	38	13	1	0	39	13
Plymouth Argyle	1925–26	Third Division South	38	19	1	0	39	19
Plymouth Argyle	1926–27	Third Division South	36	10	1	0	37	10
Plymouth Argyle	1927–28	Third Division South	29	16	1	0	30	16
Plymouth Argyle	1928–29	Third Division South	41	10	4	3	45	13
Plymouth Argyle	1929–30	Third Division South	37	21	4	3	41	24
Plymouth Argyle	1930–31	Second Division	42	19	1	0	43	19
Plymouth Argyle	1931–32	Second Division	35	14	2	0	37	14
Plymouth Argyle	1932–33	Second Division	41	13	1	0	42	13
Plymouth Argyle	1933–34	Second Division	41	12	1	0	42	12
Plymouth Argyle	1934–35	Second Division	34	7	2	1	36	8
Plymouth Argyle	1935–36	Second Division	37	15	2	1	39	16
Plymouth Argyle	1936–37	Second Division	11	5	0	0	11	5
Plymouth Argyle	1937–38	Second Division	10	0	0	0	10	0
Plymouth Argyle	Total		470	174	21	8	491	182
Queens Park Rangers	1937–38	Third Division South						
Queens Park Rangers	1938–39	Third Division South						
Queens Park Rangers	Total		5	0			5	0
Career total			475	174	21	8	496	182

== Honours ==
Plymouth Argyle

- Football League Third Division South: 1929–30

Individual

- Imperial Service Medal: 1966
- Plymouth Argyle Hall of Fame: 2004
- Plymouth Argyle Team of the Century: 2004
