= Plymouth Argyle F.C. =

Association football club in Plymouth, England

Plymouth Argyle
- Full name: Plymouth Argyle Football Club
- Nicknames: The Pilgrims; The Greens
- Founded: 1886; 140 years ago (as Argyle F.C.)
- Ground: Home Park
- Capacity: 17,000
- Owner: Simon Hallett
- Chairman: Simon Hallett
- Head coach: Tom Cleverley
- League: EFL League One
- 2025–26: EFL League One, 8th of 24
- Website: pafc.co.uk
Home colours	Away colours	Third colours

Plymouth Argyle Football Club is a professional association football club based in the city of Plymouth, Devon, England. The team currently competes in EFL League One, the third level of the English football league system. The club has played at Home Park since 1901.

The club takes its nickname, The Pilgrims, from the Pilgrim Fathers, an English religious group, that left Plymouth for the New World in 1620. The club crest features the Mayflower, the ship that carried the pilgrims to Massachusetts. The club has predominantly played in green and white throughout its history, with a few exceptions in the late 1960s and early 1970s when white was the colour of choice. A darker shade of green, described (by some) as Argyle green, was adopted in the 2001–02 season, and has been used ever since. The club has yet to compete in the Premier League or the Football League First Division that preceded it, the city of Plymouth being the largest in England to have never hosted a top-flight men's football team. Plymouth Argyle is the most southerly and westerly League club in England and the nation's only professional club named Argyle.

Originally founded simply as Argyle in 1886, the club turned professional and entered both the Southern League and Western League as Plymouth Argyle in 1903. The team won the Western League title in 1904–05 and the Southern League title in 1912–13, before winning election into the Football League Third Division in 1920. Finishing as runners-up on six consecutive occasions, Argyle eventually won promotion as Third Division South champions under the long-serving management of Bob Jack in 1929–30. A 20-year stay in the Second Division ended in 1950, though the club returned again as Third Division South champions in 1951–52. After another relegation in 1956 Argyle again proved too strong for the third tier, winning the Third Division title not long after in 1958–59.

Argyle were relegated from the Second Division in 1968, 1977 and 1992, having won promotion out of the Third Division as runners-up in 1974–75 and 1985–86. The club was relegated to the fourth tier for the first time in 1995, and though it would win immediate promotion in 1995–96, was relegated again in 1998. Promoted as champions under Paul Sturrock with 102 points in 2001–02, Argyle secured a record fourth third-tier league title in 2003–04, and would remain in the Championship for six seasons until administration and two successive relegations left the club in League Two by 2011. In 2016–17, Argyle won promotion to League One, and again in 2019–20 following relegation the previous season. In the 2022–23 season, Argyle returned to the Championship as champions, winning the third-tier league title for a record fifth time.

== History ==
=== Formation and early years (1886–1937) ===
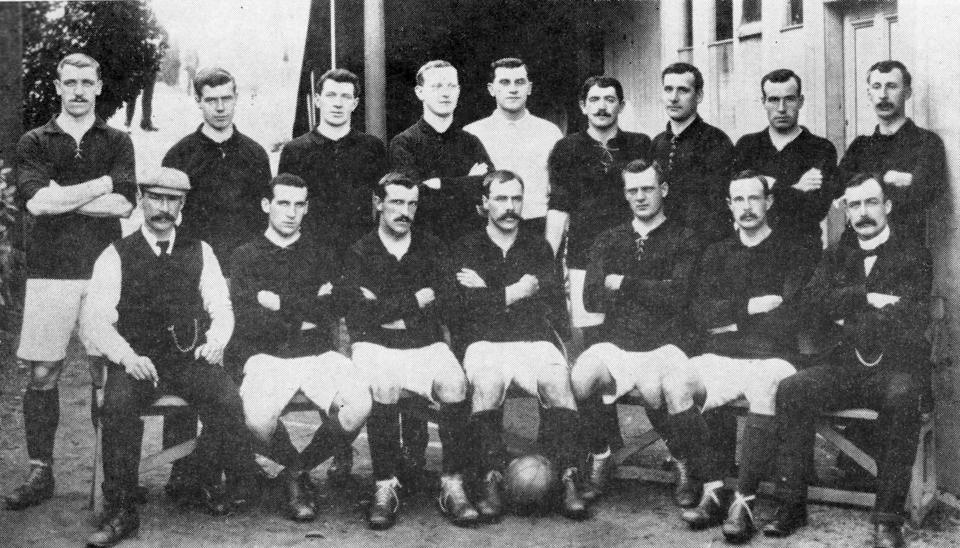
1903–04 Argyle squad

The club was founded in 1886 as Argyle Football Club, the first match taking place on 16 October 1886 against Caxton, a team from Cornwall and in which the Pilgrims lost 2–0. Later that week Argyle won for the first time, beating Dunheved College (now Launceston College) in Launceston (where many of the club's first members had been educated) 2–1. The club played several friendlies against Plymouth United, but poor performances on the pitch led to it going out of existence in 1894 before being resurrected in 1897 as one part of a general sports club, the Argyle Athletic Club. In 1898, Argyle F.C. produced its first rulebook. The club's ground was given as Marsh Mills, an area on the edge of the city of Plymouth.

Much speculation surrounds the origin of the name Argyle. One explanation is that the club was named after the Argyll and Sutherland Highlanders, an army regiment with a strong football side of its own. Another theory is given by the local geography–suggesting the name comes either from the nearby public house, The Argyle Tavern, where the founder members may have met, or from a local street Argyle Terrace. The club adopted its current name when it became fully professional in 1903, joining the Southern League, under the management of Bob Jack. Argyle's first professional game was on 1 September 1903 against West Ham United resulting in a 2–0 win for Argyle. The first home game as a fully professional club was on 5 September 1903 when Argyle beat Northampton Town 2–0 in front of a crowd of 4,438. Argyle won the Southern League in 1913, then in 1920 entered the Football League Third Division as a founder member, finishing 11th in its first season.

Chart of table positions of Plymouth Argyle in the Football League

In the summer of 1924, a Plymouth Argyle team visited South America to play some exhibition football in Argentina and Uruguay. Argyle thrashed Uruguay 4–0 in the first game (the team which went on to win the first ever World Cup just six years later), before pulling off another shock by beating Argentina 1–0. Argyle then held Argentine giants Boca Juniors to a creditable 1–1 draw. Moses Russell captained the side and played in all nine matches. Russell's style of play caught the attention of the Argentine press; at the end of the tour 'The Standard of Buenos Aires' commented: "The visit of Plymouth Argyle will be best remembered by the outstanding personality and genius of Moses Russell. His effective style, precise judgement, accurate and timely clearances, powerful kicking and no less useful work with his head...one of the most wonderful backs and one of the brainiest players ever seen on the football field."

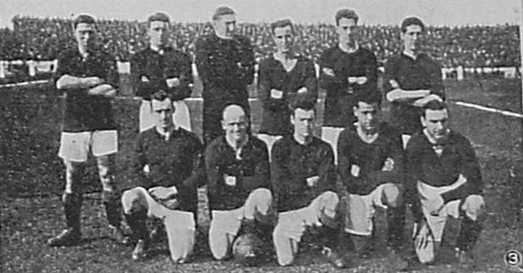
A Plymouth Argyle team during the tour on South America, 1924

In the match against Boca Juniors on 9 July 1924, the Boca Juniors supporters invaded the pitch after their team had scored the opening goal and carried all eleven home players shoulder high around the stadium. After a half-hour delay, the referee restarted the match, but a further invasion was sparked when the referee awarded a penalty against the home side. When the match was again restarted, the Argyle players had agreed that Patsy Corcoran would take the spot-kick and miss, to prevent another pitch invasion. However, the ultra-competitive Russell was not prepared to accept this, and just before Corcoran was about to take the penalty he was pushed aside by Russell, who took it himself and scored. This prompted a further pitch invasion by the Boca fans and this time the match was abandoned.

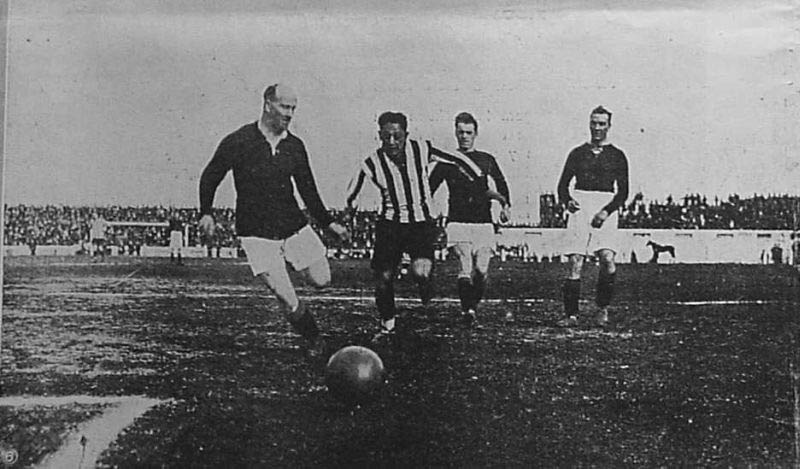
Argyle vs Argentina national football team in 1924

Back in England, uniquely, between 1921–22 and 1926–27, Argyle finished second in the Third Division South six seasons in a row, thereby missing promotion. Argyle eventually won promotion to Football League Division Two in 1929–30, when the club topped the Third Division South, with attendances that season regularly reaching 20,000. Manager Bob Jack resigned in 1937, having spent 27 years in charge of the Pilgrims. Eleven years earlier in 1928, David Jack, who began his career with Argyle in 1919 but left in 1920, joined Arsenal F.C. from Bolton Wanderers for a fee of £10,890 – which made him the most expensive player in the world at the time. He was also the first player to score at Wembley Stadium.

=== 1937–1986 ===
After the Second World War, Argyle's 20-year stay in Division Two came to an end in 1950–despite the efforts of inspirational captain Jack Chisholm. However, the club was back in Division Two before long, after winning the Third Division South in 1952. The closest the club has ever come to playing in the Football League First Division (top tier) was in 1952–53, when reaching fourth place in the Football League Second Division, the highest finish to date. In the 1954–1955 season floodlights arrived at Home Park, but in 1956 Argyle went down again. The Pilgrims' reputation as a 'yo-yo club' continued after winning Division Three–by now a national league–in 1959.

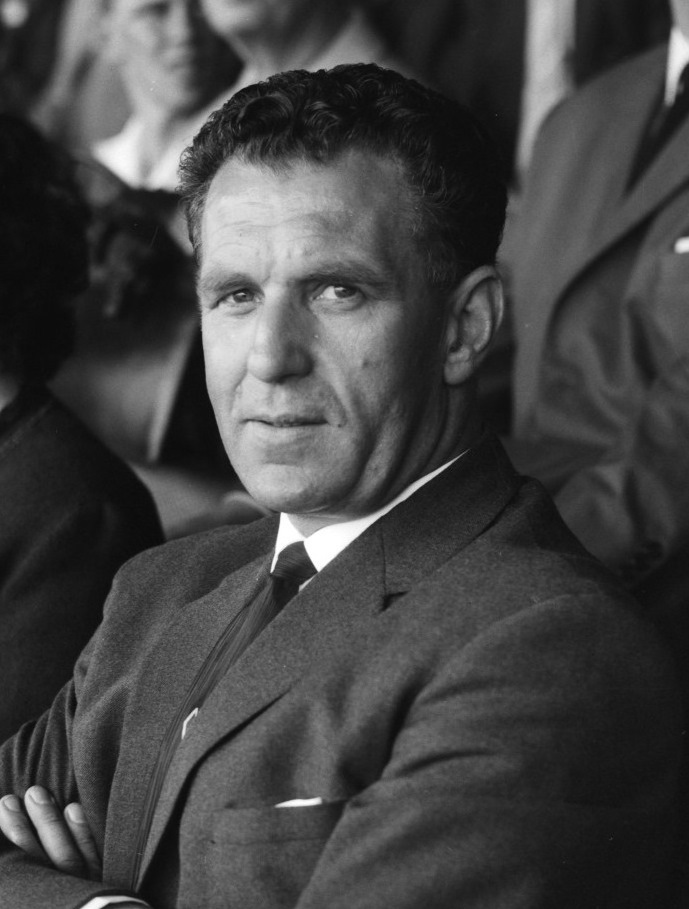
Jack Rowley managed the club for over 230 games between 1955 and 1960, and won the Football League Third Division with the club in 1959

The 1960s started with one of the most bizarre events in Argyle's history. It came in the spring of 1963, when the club went on a mini-tour of Poland—the Pilgrims were invited to play a game as a warm-up to an international cycle race. Amazingly, 100,000 saw Argyle that day—the biggest crowd ever to attend a Plymouth match. In 1965 Argyle reached the Football League Cup semi-final, as a 2nd division team, for the first time in its history, but lost to Leicester City. But the decade ended disappointingly as Argyle returned to Division Three after relegation in 1968.

In March 1973 a memorable moment in Argyle's history was witnessed by 37,639 people at Home Park. Argyle played a friendly match against Brazilian giants Santos FC, who at the time were one of the best teams in the world. That day Santos also had arguably the best footballer of all time in their starting line-up –Pelé. However, Argyle, then a Third Division side, shocked the world with a 3–2 win. The Greens were actually 3–0 up at one stage (thanks to goals from Mike Dowling, Derek Rickard and Jimmy Hinch) but a penalty scored at the Barn Park End by Pelé helped a Santos fightback. However, in the end Santos came up short and were defeated. There was a huge pitch invasion at the final whistle after a win for The Pilgrims.

In 1974 – with future England striker and Argyle manager Paul Mariner now playing for the team – Argyle again reached the League Cup semi-final, this time as a Third Division side. Argyle drew the first leg at home against Manchester City 1–1, but lost the Maine Road encounter 2–0. After spending six years in Division Three, Argyle finally returned to Division Two in 1974–75, under the management of Tony Waiters. This was mainly thanks to strike partners Paul Mariner and Billy Rafferty, who scored a very impressive 46 goals between them. However, the club was back down again in 1977. Although the decade did end on a high note–in 1978–79 Kevin Hodges made his Argyle debut, and he went on to play 620 games for the club–more than any other player.

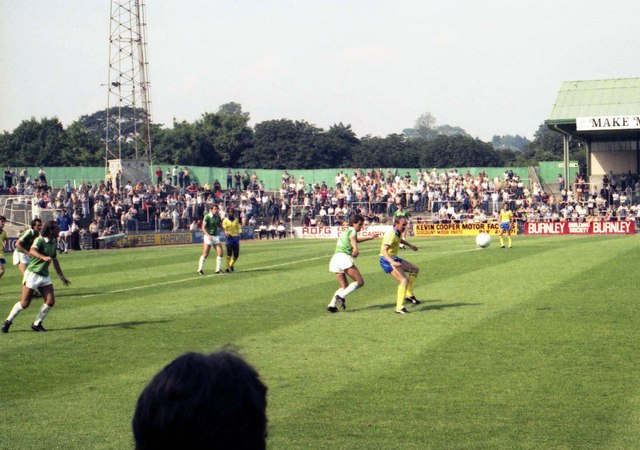
Match at Home Park in 1981

In 1984 Plymouth reached the FA Cup semi-final despite being in the Third Division. After a successful cup run in which Argyle beat West Bromwich Albion away, a top division team at the time (1–0 courtesy of a Tommy Tynan goal after 58 minutes), and Derby County (the first game at Home Park ended 0–0, but Argyle won the replay 0–1 at the Baseball Ground), they lost 1–0 to Watford in the semi-final at Villa Park courtesy of a George Reilly goal. However, manager John Hore was sacked during the following campaign and was replaced by Dave Smith. In 1985–86, Smith's first full season in charge, Argyle finished as runners-up in Division Three, resulting in promotion. The following season, despite being a newly promoted team, Argyle finished a respectable 7th place in Division Two, thereby narrowly missing the division's new play-off zone and the chance to move to the First Division (now the Premier League). In 1988 Smith surprisingly left to take charge of Dundee, making way for Ken Brown to become manager.

=== Success and into the Championship (1986–2008) ===
In the 1990s a new face took over the club: Businessman Dan McCauley became chairman, and his first major decision was to sack Dave Kemp and appoint England's record cap holder Peter Shilton as player-manager in the 1991–92 season. But Shilton was unable to prevent relegation as Argyle finished 22nd in Division Two. Ahead of the 1992–93 season, English football had a revamp. The First Division (top tier) became the Premiership, Division Two (second tier) became Division One, Division Three (third tier) was now Division Two and so on. As a result, Argyle was still in Division Two, but it was now the third tier instead of the second.

In 1992–93 Argyle finished in mid-table in the third tier, but Peter Shilton's side finished third the following campaign (as a result of playing some excellent football), thereby qualifying for the play-offs. But Argyle lost in the semi-final against Burnley, which saw the start of a fierce rivalry between the two clubs. The Pilgrims suffered even more disappointment in 1994–95 as Shilton parted company with the club, which was eventually relegated to Division Three (fourth tier) for the first time in its history. Player Steve McCall became the club's manager on a short-term deal after Shilton's departure, but at the end of the season his contract was not renewed and Neil Warnock stepped in as his successor. At the end of the 1995–96 season, Warnock took Plymouth to Division Three play-off glory in his first campaign as manager. The semi-final was a memorable affair. Argyle played Colchester United and although 1–0 down from the 1st leg, won 3–1 at Home Park in the 2nd, meaning that the Pilgrims were going to Wembley for the first time in their history. Argyle beat Darlington 1–0 in the play-off final to gain third-tier football once more.

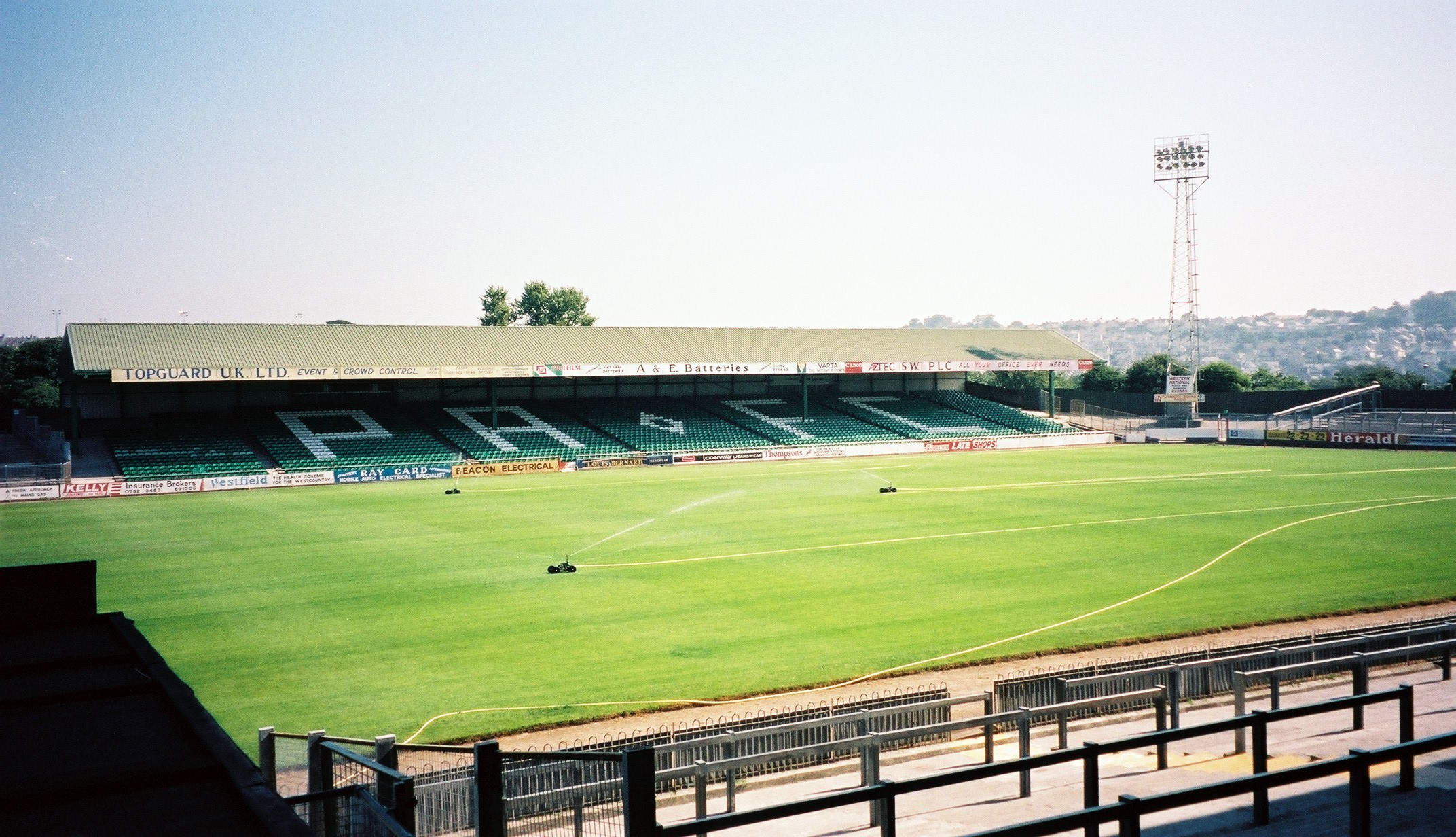
Home Park in 1996

But Warnock was sacked within a year as the club narrowly avoided being relegated back to the fourth tier. Mick Jones became his successor, and, that season, in February 1997 Argyle participated in 'The Battle of Saltergate' – in a 1–2 win at Chesterfield. The following season Argyle went down under Jones, and his successor Kevin Hodges (the club's record appearance holder) lasted three years before a failure to attain promotion (or even a play-off place) cost him his job. At this point Argyle was in danger of insolvency, and it was the lowest point in its history.

The appointment of Paul Sturrock as manager in November 2000 marked a turning point in Argyle's history. He saved the club from relegation out of the Football League (the club was fourth from bottom of the league when he became manager), and finished 12th in his first season. The following campaign proved to be the most successful in the club's history. Argyle defeated Cheltenham Town 2–0 in the final game of the season to achieve a club and league record of 102 points and clinch the Division Three title.

Argyle was one of the favourites to win the Division Two title going into the 2003–04 season, and proved everyone right as the club earned its second promotion in three years. In March 2004 Bobby Williamson was appointed manager. Argyle's first game in the newly re-branded 'Championship' (second tier) saw them draw 0–0 at home to Millwall, who were FA Cup finalists the season before. Argyle's strong start continued, and the club briefly reached the top of the table – its highest ever position – after a 0–1 win at Cardiff City, before plummeting down the table and finishing 17th. The 2005–06 season included some memorable results for the Green Army including the 2–0 win against high-flying Wolverhampton Wanderers and a 0–0 draw at Leeds United, who went on to reach the play-off final at the Millennium Stadium before losing 3–0 to Watford. The Pilgrims finished 14th that season, in the end well clear of the relegation zone.

In summer 2006, in one of Ian Holloway's first games in charge of the club, Argyle played a pre-season friendly against Real Madrid in Austria, as both clubs were training in the country at the time. Holloway's first competitive game in charge was a 1–1 draw at home to Wolves. The team made significantly better progress than in recent seasons in the FA Cup, reaching the quarter-finals. They beat League Two Peterborough United. They beat Championship league leaders Derby County 2–0 in the next, but in the quarter finals, faced Premier League strugglers Watford at home and lost. Argyle finished the 2006–07 in 11th place, the highest league finish for 20 years.

Before the start of the 2007–08 season, manager Ian Holloway said that Plymouth was capable of earning promotion to the Premier League for the first time in its history, and the team made a good start to the new season with a 2–3 win at Hull City. The club's good start continued as they stayed near the play-off places for the first few months. However, on 21 November 2007 Ian Holloway controversially resigned to take charge of Leicester City.

=== Decline and financial issues (2008–2018) ===
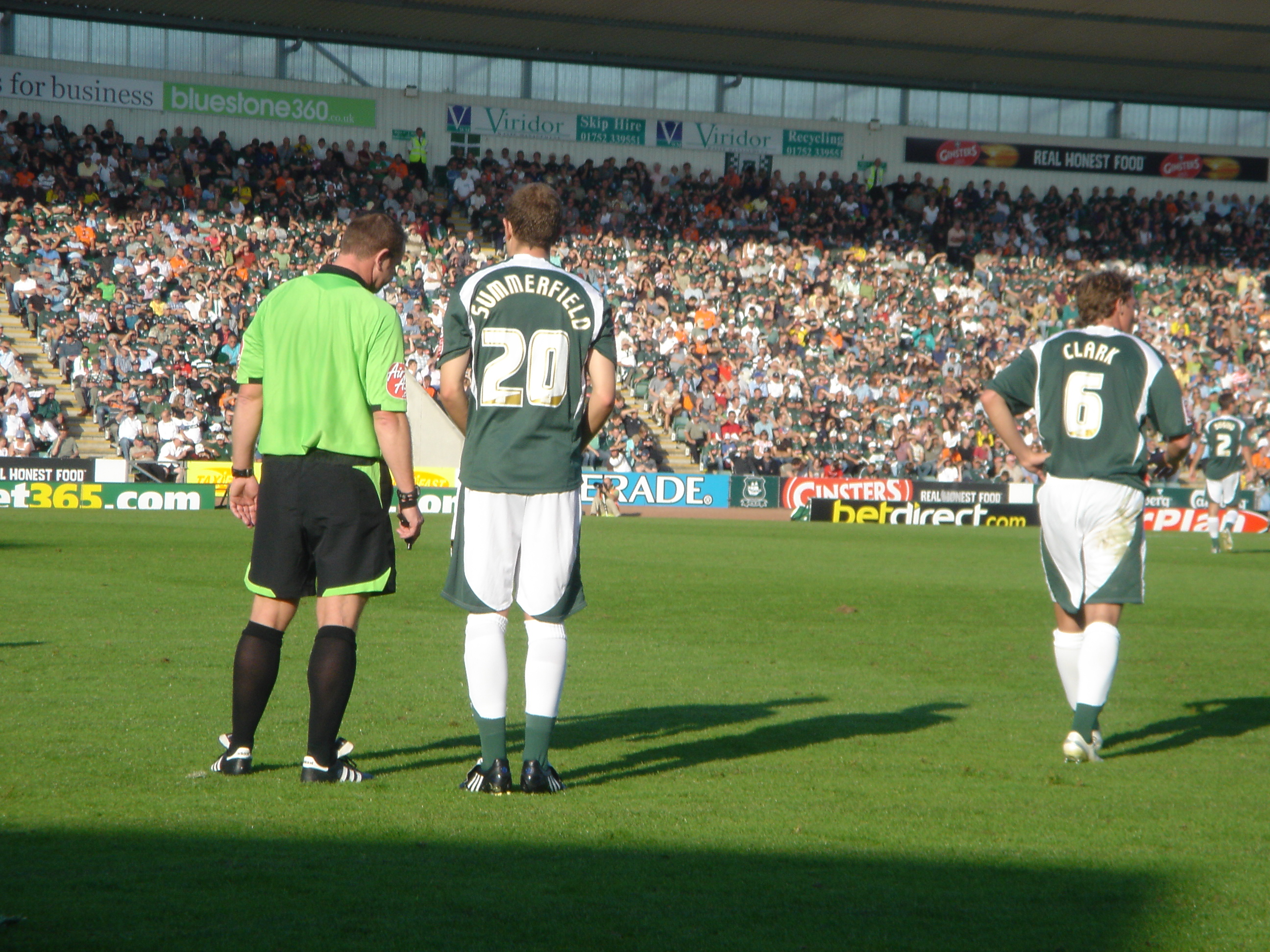
Match at Home Park in 2008

The club finished 2008 in 15th place–now 8 points adrift of the play-offs. On 3 January 2009, Argyle travelled to the recently built Emirates Stadium to play against Premier League giants Arsenal in the FA Cup third round. Striker Robin Van Persie scored his second of the game five minutes from time to give Arsenal a 3–1 win. The club finished 21st in the league table, five points and one place clear of the relegation places–Argyle's first season which didn't improve its league position for eight years.

Paul Sturrock's second stint in charge came to an end on 10 December 2009, when a press conference confirmed he was relieved of his managerial duties due to two years of poor results and fan unrest. However, Mariner lost his first two games–his first fixture resulted in a 2–0 loss at Preston North End and then Argyle was defeated 1–0 at home to Coventry, leaving the Pilgrims bottom of the table and six points adrift of safety. Argyle ended the season as the second lowest-scoring team in the division. The club's six-year stay in the second tier of the Football League was over. On 20 November, following a 1–2 home defeat to Brentford, newly relegated Argyle was 20th in League One, just one place and three points above the relegation zone.

On 23 November, Argyle came from 0–1 down to beat fellow strugglers Dagenham & Redbridge 2–1 at Home Park, lifting them up to 15th. However, just 4,960 were present at the game. That was Argyle's lowest league attendance since playing in the bottom tier. Not long after, the Pilgrims were presented with a winding-up order by HMRC and appeared in court on 8 December, only to earn a 63-day adjournment so they could pay the taxes they owed. Relegation was later confirmed on 2 May, following a 3–1 home defeat against Southampton.

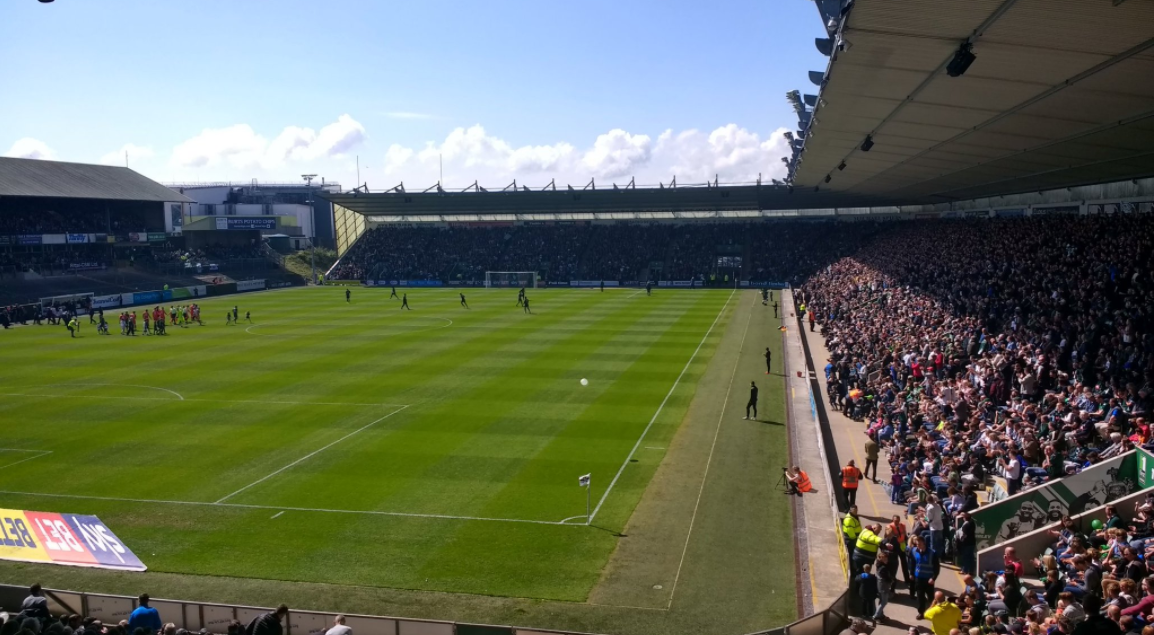
Match at Home Park in 2017

James Brent's Akkeron Group agreed to a deal with the Administrators to buy the club with Peter Ridsdale also confirming that he would leave the club when the deal had been completed. Further problems occurred with the Administrators threatening to quit the club. Argyle agreed to a deal to sell Home Park back to Plymouth council on 14 October for £1.6m and had to pay £135,000 a year in rent. The team's form greatly improved after the takeover, and while the eventual League finish of 21st was the lowest in the club's history, the club still secured survival with three games to spare, which was quite an achievement considering it had been well adrift at the bottom for the first half of the campaign. In the following season, the club was again narrowly saved from relegation, and finished 21st for a consecutive season. Sheridan then agreed a three-year contract to continue as Argyle manager, and in his first full season in charge, the club finished 10th. Argyle had a far stronger start to its fourth consecutive season in League 2, winning 4 games consecutively for the first time since 2008.

The team had the chance to go up as champions. But the title was handed to Portsmouth via goal difference. The Pilgrims got off to an appalling start to their League One campaign, gaining only 5 points in their first 11 games and sitting rock bottom, already 4 points from safety after only 11 games. And a 2–1 defeat at home to Fleetwood added to Argyle's woes, extending the winless run to 10 games and earning just 2 points from a possible 30 in that time. Some fans disputed the board sacking Derek Adams even after taking them up in the previous season, due to poor tactics and game management. From December 2017, through 2018 saw Argyle record 16 wins, 6 draws and only 5 losses to escape relegation and finish 7th, only missing out on a play-off spot by 3 points.

=== Hallett takes over (2018–present) ===
In August 2018, Hallett became the majority shareholder of the club, with James Brent reducing his stake, as well as stepping down as chairman. Hallett had originally appointed David Felwick CBE as Argyle's chairman-elect, but he cited "personal reasons" for being unable to take over, so Hallett took over as chairman on 1 November 2018. At the end of the 2018–19 season, Argyle was relegated to League Two.

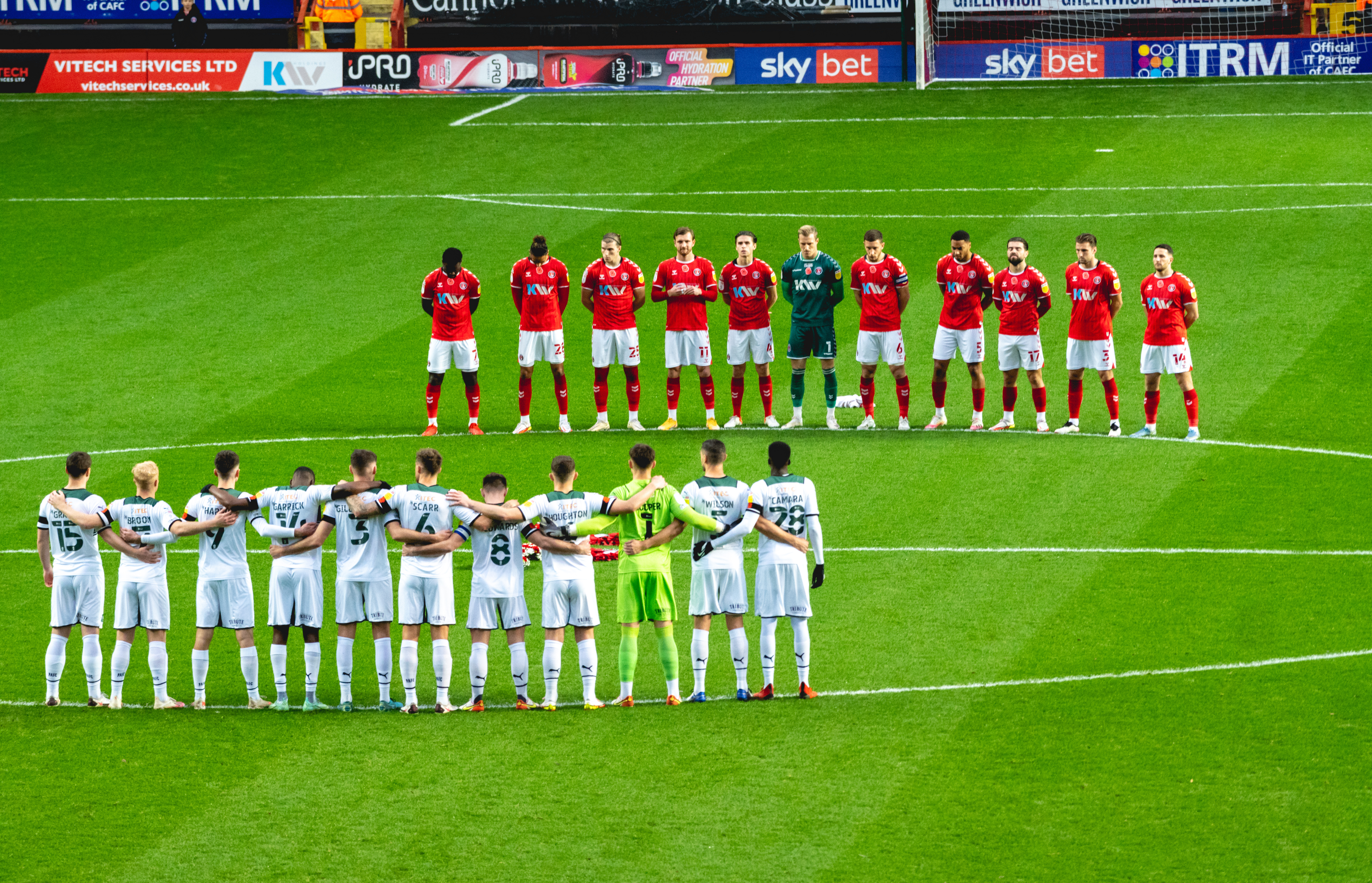
Plymouth Argyle players before a match against Charlton Athletic in 2021

Ahead of the 2019–20 season, Hallett appointed Ryan Lowe as Derek Adams's successor, signing the then 40-year-old Liverpudlian and his assistant manager Steven Schumacher from Bury. The change in management was a success as that season, Argyle finished in third place, gaining promotion back to League One. Albeit, the next season the team struggled to find their footing in the third tier, and finished 18th on 53 points. The following season was an improvement, and in December 2021 Ryan Lowe was replaced by his assistant, Steven Schumacher leading the club into 7th place for the 2021–22 season.

Argyle enjoyed its best season since 2008 in 2022–23, with the new Mayflower stand fully built, the capacity of Home Park rose to 17,900, and the club regularly saw 16,000 fans turning up to support the team. The club won the EFL League One title, clinching it in an away win at Port Vale, and finishing the season on 101 points. In their first season back in the second tier in thirteen years, Plymouth finished in 21st position, avoiding relegation on the final day of the season.

In the 2024–25 season, Plymouth, who were sitting at the bottom of the league table, defeated Premier League leaders Liverpool 1–0 at Home Park in the fourth round of the FA Cup with a goal from Ryan Hardie, having previously defeated Premier League Brentford in the third round at the Gtech Community Stadium.They then went on to lose 3-1 at Manchester City in the 5th round despite taking a shock 1-0 lead. 8,000 Argyle fans made the trip.

== Sponsorship ==
The club's current sportswear manufacturer is Puma. The club's main sponsor is currently Beacon Electrical. (https://www.pafc.co.uk/club/club-partners/beacon-electrical) Shirt sponsorship was first introduced by the club in 1983. Beacon Electrical was the first company to have its name on the shirt of Plymouth Argyle, but it lasted just one season. Ivor Jones Insurance was the next sponsor and their agreement with the club lasted for two seasons. National & Provincial (now merged with Abbey National) were sponsors for the 1986–87 season before the club signed an agreement with the Sunday Independent which would last for five seasons. Rotolok Holdings plc became the club's major sponsor in 1992, which was owned by then Pilgrims chairman Dan McCauley. This lasted for six seasons before the club linked up with local newspaper the Evening Herald. Between 2002 and 2011 the club was sponsored by Cornish pasty-makers Ginsters.

In 2011 with the club still in administration, local timber merchant WH Bond Timber sponsored Argyle's kits at first for the 2011–12 season and until the end of the 2013–14 season. Local construction access company LTC Group87 then sponsored Argyle from the start of the 2014–15 season, having their LTC Powered Access branch's logo on the shirts. Cornwall-based company Ginsters then came back for a second spell as main sponsor in the 2016–17 season.

Period	Brand	Shirt Sponsor
1975–1976	Umbro	None
1976–1978	Pilgrim	None
1978–1980	Bukta	None
1980–1982	Adidas	None
1982–1983	Pilgrim	None
1983–1984	Pilgrim	Beacon Electrical
1984–1986	Pilgrim	Ivor Jones Insurance
1986–1987	Pilgrim	National & Provincial
1987–1990	Umbro	Sunday Independent
1990–1992	Ribero	Sunday Independent
1992–1996	Admiral	Rotolok
1996–1998	Super League	Rotolok
1998–1999	Errea	Evening Herald
1999–2002	Patrick	Evening Herald
2002–2003	Patrick	Ginsters
2003–2005	TFG	Ginsters
2005–2009	Puma	Ginsters
2009–2011	Adidas	Ginsters
2011–2014	Puma	WH Bond Timber
2014–2016	Puma	LTC Powered Access
2016–2022	Puma	Ginsters
2022–2023	Puma	Project 35
2023–2024	Puma	WH Bond Timber
2024–2025	Puma	Classic Builders(SW)
2025–Present	Puma	Beacon Electrical

== Stadium ==
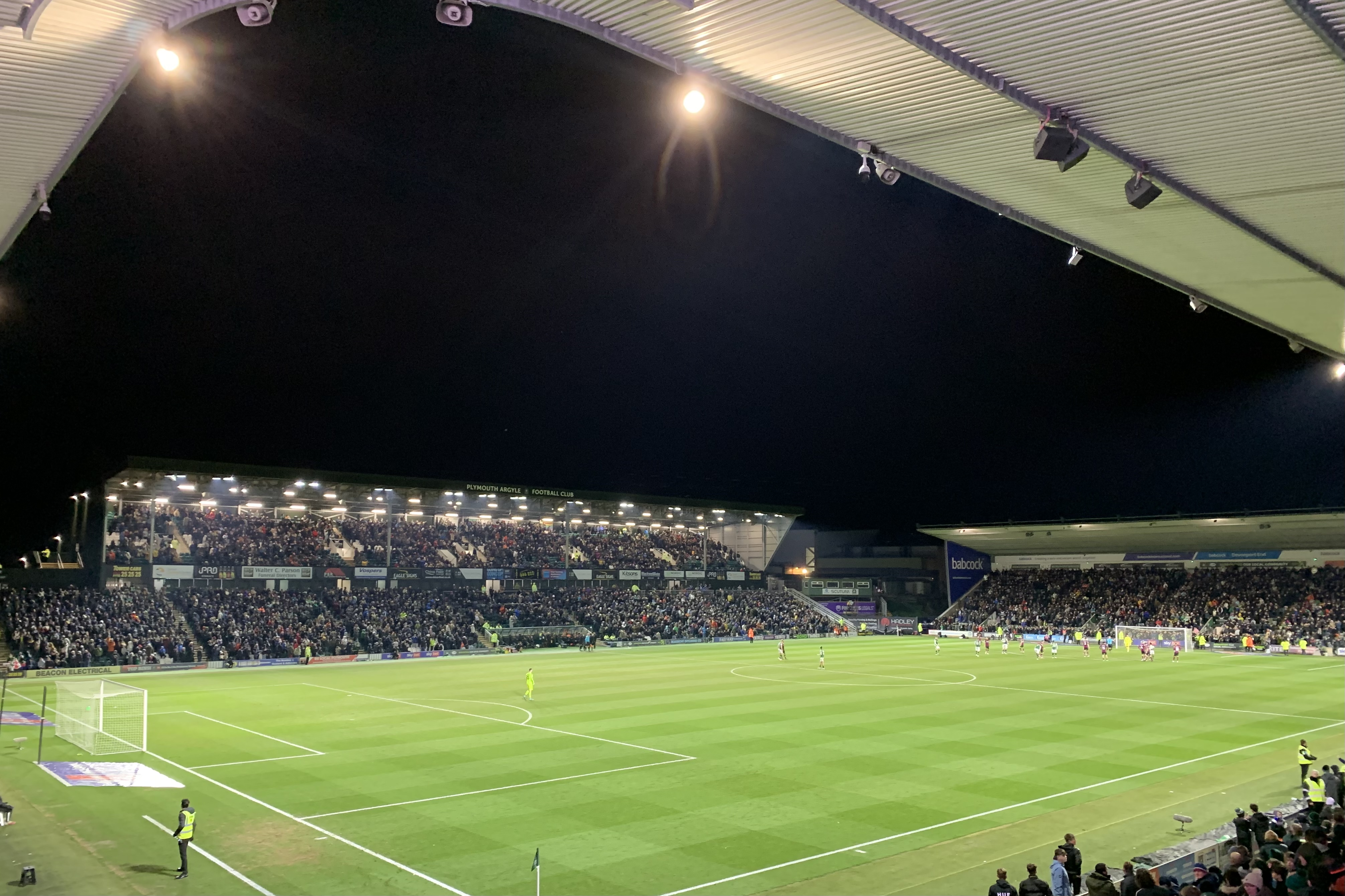
Home Park in 2023

The original ground of the professional club at Home Park was destroyed by German bombers during the Blitz on Plymouth in World War II. Having been rebuilt after the war, Home Park was largely demolished as part of an extensive process of renovation, and the first phase of a new stadium built by Barrs plc was completed in May 2002. The new Devonport End was opened for the 2001 Boxing Day fixture with Torquay United. The other end, the Barn Park End, opened on the same day. The Lyndhurst stand reopened on 26 January 2002 for the game against Oxford United. Plans are currently under discussion regarding the completion of the refurbishment of the ground with the replacement of the Mayflower stand. The ground is situated in Central Park, very near to the residential area of Milehouse. Towards the end of the 2005–06 Championship season, the club decided to buy the stadium for £2.7 million from Plymouth City Council, releasing the ground from a 125-year lease. This purchase was concluded in December 2006.

In the summer of 2007, the club, having failed to persuade the UK authorities of the case for retaining a standing terrace, decided to add 3,500 temporary seats to the Mayflower enclosure, dropping the capacity to 19,888 from 20,922. In December 2009 it was announced that the stadium was to be one of 12 chosen to host matches during the World Cup 2018, should England's bid be successful. The then Argyle chairman Paul Stapleton stated that work on a new South Stand at Home Park would start in 2010. However, England failed to be chosen for the 2018 tournament, and Plymouth Argyle entered administration in March 2011. After selling the stadium back to the council on 14 October 2011 for £1.6 million, this project was in serious doubt.

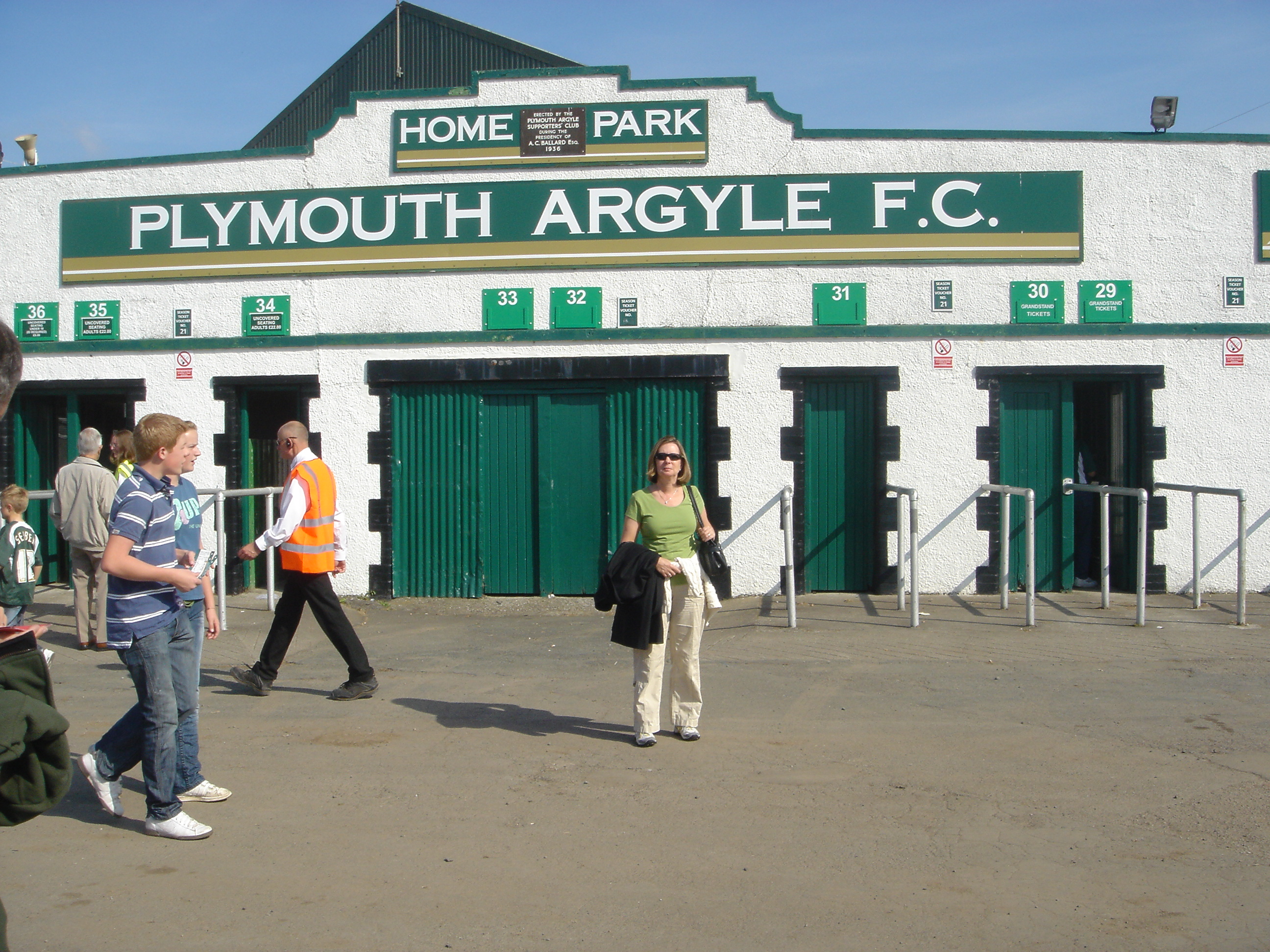
The Old entrance to the Mayflower stand has been the official club shop since 2021

The club was then taken over by local business owner James Brent, who submitted fresh plans to build a new Mayflower Grandstand with a 5,000 seating capacity, and an associated leisure complex. The plans include an ice rink with 1,500 spectator seats, a 10 screen cinema complex with an iMax screen, a 120 bedroom hotel and 4,200m sq retail units. Planning permission for the project was granted on 15 August 2013. The development was due to commence in September 2013, with the demolition of the old stand planned for late October 2013 after the Portsmouth home match. As of June 2015, the plans have been withdrawn, though planning permission still remains.

The family section of the stadium was moved from block 1 of the Devonport End to the 'Zoo corner' between the Lyndhurst Stand and the Barn Park End, with a kids activities zone in the concourse. In January 2017, director Simon Hallett invested £5,000,000 into the club, along with all other directors exchanging previous loans into equity, with the intention on using the money for renovating the Mayflower Grandstand. No immediate timeframe was put on the renovations, but chairman James Brent indicated work is planned to start in 2018, finishing in 2020 ahead of the Plymouth 2020 Mayflower celebrations.

Later that month, temporary seating was once again put in place on the Grandstand, this time as a one-off for an FA Cup 3rd round replay vs Liverpool. The seating was kept in place for the next home match, a League 2 game vs Devon rivals Exeter City, but tickets were not on sale to the general public. Shortly after this game, the seating was removed. In 2021 the redevelopment of the Mayflower stand was completed, expanding the ground's capacity to 17,900 and making it an all seater stadium.

== Support ==
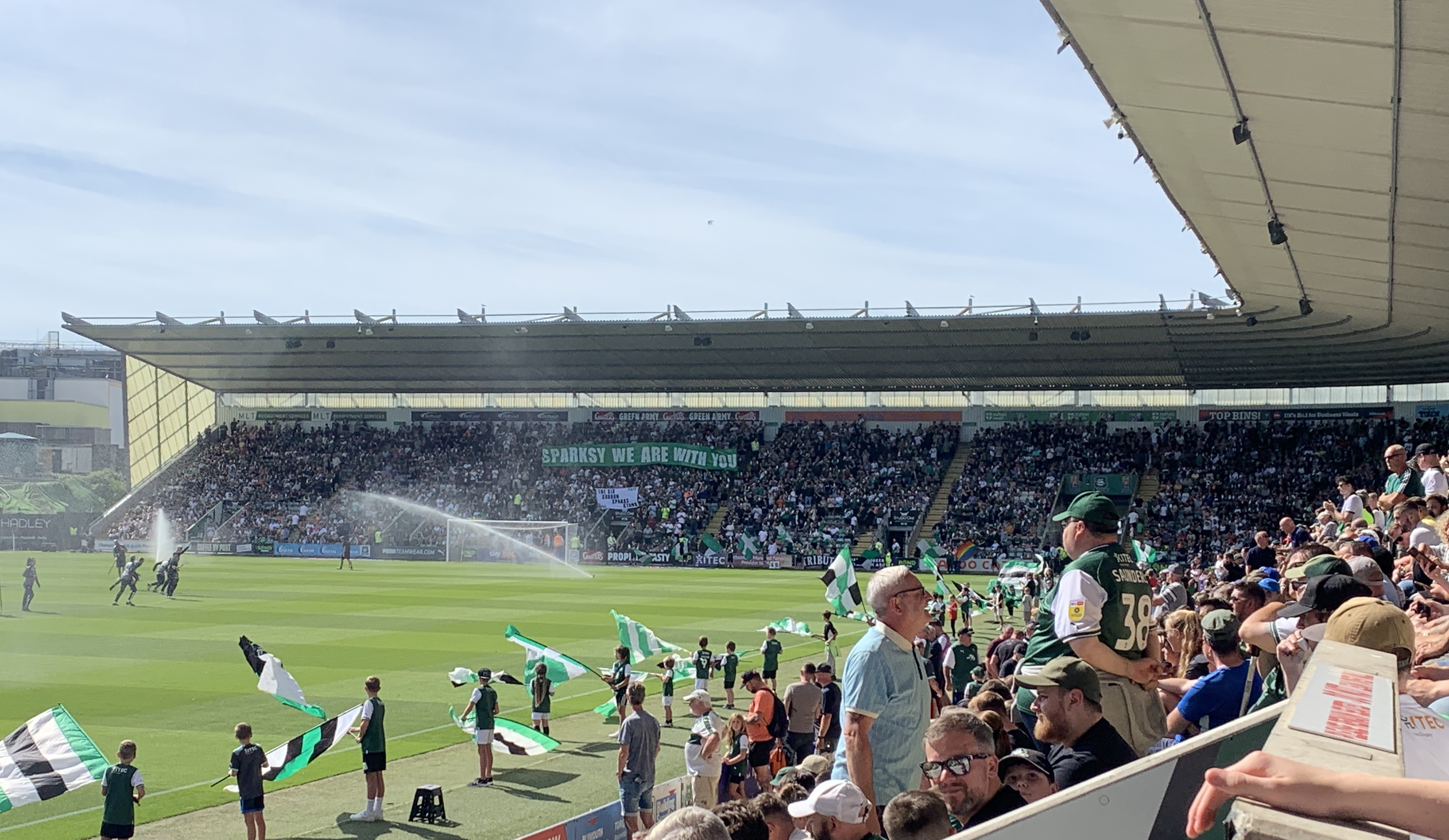
Plymouth Argyle fans, 2022

Plymouth Argyle fans are known collectively as the Green Army. The No.12 shirt has been reserved for the Green Army as the 12th man for many seasons.

Argyle fans are often referred to as "Janners", the unofficial nickname used to describe residents of Plymouth. The 1940s saw the club attract the highest average attendances, with the largest ever being recorded in the 1946–47 season, when an average of 23,290 fans watched each game. Attendances remained fairly strong until the start of the 1980s, when, in the 1984–85, an average of just 537 attended each game, the lowest in the club's entire history. Albeit, the decline in attendances was notable throughout the entirety of English football during this period as they were some of the foremost decades of Football hooliganism.

During this period, a hooligan firm named The Central Element emerged as a gang in the mid-1980s. It was set up by a group of 16-to-18-year-old friends from Plymouth who used to frequent pubs in Stonehouse and the city centre. The name was decided by founding members and makes reference to Central Park, where many encounters with rival firms took place. At the time, there was already an established hooligan element attached to Argyle, older men who later became known as the A38s. TCE had an all-male membership, aged 15 to 45, who followed Argyle home and away. Many held season tickets, but their interests were more about what happened off the pitch than on it. The group attempted to gain a reputation amongst larger firms whose teams were much, much higher up the football violence league, including Millwall's Bushwackers, Cardiff's Soul Crew and West Ham United's Inter City Firm.

Today, the club's main base of supporters are those from the city of Plymouth but also from Cornwall to the west, and Devon (of which Plymouth is a historical part). The "Devonport End" is where the most vocal supporters watch the game.

Since the 2021–22 season, The Janner Song has been played before every home game. A survey conducted by Football Fans Census in 2003 confirmed that Plymouth Argyle supporters consider their main rival to be Exeter City. The two clubs first met in a competitive fixture in 1908 when in the Southern League The club's traditional rivals are fellow Devon sides Exeter City and Torquay United; other less intense rivalries exist with Swindon Town, Portsmouth, Bristol City and Bristol Rovers.

== Players ==
=== Current squad ===
As of 12 September 2026

Note: Flags indicate national team as defined under FIFA eligibility rules; some limited exceptions apply. Players may hold more than one non-FIFA nationality.

No.	Pos.	Nation	Player
1	GK	ENG	Murphy Cooper
2	DF	DEN	Mathias Ross
3	DF	SCO	Jack MacKenzie
5	DF	ESP	Julio Pleguezuelo
6	MF	ENG	Malachi Boateng
7	MF	ENG	Harvey White
8	DF	ENG	Joe Edwards (captain)
9	FW	WAL	Will Evans
10	MF	ENG	Xavier Amaechi
11	FW	IRL	Ronan Curtis
14	FW	ENG	Oliver Irow (on loan from Tottenham Hotspur)
15	DF	ENG	Alex Mitchell

No.	Pos.	Nation	Player
17	MF	AUS	Caleb Watts
18	FW	NGR	Owen Oseni
19	MF	ENG	Tyreeq Bakinson (on loan from Leyton Orient)
20	MF	GHA	Michael Baidoo
21	GK	IRL	James Storer
22	DF	ENG	Alex Hartridge
23	MF	ENG	Bradley Ibrahim
27	FW	CAN	Aribim Pepple
29	DF	ENG	Matthew Sorinola
38	MF	ENG	Seb Campbell
45	DF	JAM	Wes Harding (vice-captain)

==== Out on loan ====
Note: Flags indicate national team as defined under FIFA eligibility rules; some limited exceptions apply. Players may hold more than one non-FIFA nationality.

No.	Pos.	Nation	Player
24	MF	ENG	Caleb Roberts (on loan at Torquay United until 2 January 2027)
25	FW	WAL	Freddie Issaka (on loan at Gateshead until 10 January 2027)

No.	Pos.	Nation	Player
26	FW	ENG	Tegan Finn (on loan at Torquay United until 5 October 2026)

==== Sources ====
- "Argyle Squad List 2025–26" (PDF). PAFC. Plymouth Argyle.

==== Retired numbers ====
- 12 – The Green Army (supporters)

=== Youth & reserves squad ===
==== Under–18 team ====
As of 30 June 2025

Note: Flags indicate national team as defined under FIFA eligibility rules; some limited exceptions apply. Players may hold more than one non-FIFA nationality.

No.	Pos.	Nation	Player
41	GK	ENG	Leo McCormick (2nd Year)
44	GK	ENG	Thomas Armytage (Under 16)
39	DF	ENG	Sam Hayman (2nd Year)
40	DF	ENG	Joe Mwaro (2nd Year)
—	DF	ENG	Jovan Wamani (1st Year)
—	DF	ENG	Toby Maclean (2nd Year)
—	DF	ENG	Deniz Doru (1st Year)
—	DF	ENG	Corey Browne (1st Year)
—	DF	ENG	Dylan Williams (1st Year)

No.	Pos.	Nation	Player
38	MF	ENG	Seb Campbell (2nd Year)
—	MF	ENG	Billy Devlin (2nd Year)
—	MF	ENG	Joel Tolcher (1st Year)
—	MF	ENG	Harry Locke (1st Year)
43	FW	ENG	James Sharpe (1st Year)
42	FW	ENG	Jared Rendle (2nd Year)
46	FW	ENG	Frankie Maund (2nd Year)
—	FW	ENG	Tashall Sandhu (2nd Year)
—	FW	ENG	Emran Wischhoff (1st Year)

==== Reserve team history ====
Through the 1960s and 70s, Argyle's Reserve team played in the Plymouth & Devon Combination League, with their home games at Cottage Field, next to Home Park. Argyle later entered into The Football Combination, before withdrawing from the Combination in mid-season in 1981–82, for financial reasons. In 1982 the side entered the Western Football League, leaving at the end of the 1992–93 season.

The club had also entered a team in the South Western League, but withdrew from that competition after one season in 2007. The club's reserve team, up to the end of the 2010–11 season, played in The Football Combination, and confirmed their withdrawal from it on 27 June 2011, alongside 18 other Football League clubs.

The reserves' honours include the Southern League Championship in 1922, 1926, 1929, 1934 and its League Cup in 1933, 1934 and 1936; 1934 was the first Southern League Double.

For the 2015–16 season, Argyle entered a team into the South West Peninsula League Division One West, with home matches originally planned to be played at Bickleigh Barracks, before a change of plan saw them played at Seale-Hayne, dubbed 'Hodges Park' after club legend Kevin Hodges, outside Newton Abbot. After applying for promotion and finishing 2nd behind Mousehole, the reserves side were promoted to the Premier Division for the 2016–17 season. The team again moved grounds, playing their games at the home of the Devon FA, Coach Road, in Newton Abbot and finished 6th in 2016–17.

In April 2019 it was announced that Argyle Reserves were pulling out of the South West Peninsula League at the end of the season. A new development team, run by the Argyle Community Trust would enter the new Devon Football League for the 2019–20 season.

=== Player of the Year ===
Year	Winner
1966	(England) Johnny Newman
1967	(England) Norman Piper
1968	(Republic of Ireland) Pat Dunne
1969	(England) David Burnside
1970	(England) Derek Rickard
1971	(England) Jim Furnell
1972	(Scotland) Dave Provan
1973	(England) Neil Hague
1974	(England) Ernie Machin
1975	(England) Paul Mariner
1976	(England) Paul Mariner
1977	(England) Neil Ramsbottom
1978	(England) George Foster
1979	(England) Fred Binney
1980	(England) George Foster
1981	(England) David Kemp

Year	Winner
1982	(England) John Sims
1983	(England) Gordon Nisbet
1984	(England) Gordon Staniforth
1985	(England) Tommy Tynan
1986	(England) Kevin Hodges
1987	(England) Tommy Tynan
1988	(England) Steve Cherry
1989	(England) Tommy Tynan
1990	(England) Nicky Marker
1991	(England) Kenny Brown
1992	(Jamaica) Dwight Marshall
1993	(England) Steve McCall
1994	(England) Steve McCall
1995	(England) Marc Edworthy
1996	(England) Mick Heathcote
1997	(England) Chris Billy

Year	Winner
1998	(England) Martin Barlow
1998	(Canada) Carlo Corazzin
1999	(England) Mick Heathcote
2000	(England) Paul McGregor
2001	(Republic of Ireland) Wayne O'Sullivan
2002	(Republic of Ireland) Graham Coughlan
2003	(England) Paul Wotton
2004	(Republic of Ireland) Mickey Evans
2005	(England) Paul Wotton
2006	(England) David Norris
2007	(France) Lilian Nalis
2008	(Hungary) Krisztián Timár
2009	(France) Romain Larrieu
2010	(Wales) Carl Fletcher
2011	(Wales) Carl Fletcher
2012	(France) Maxime Blanchard

Year	Winner
2013	(Zimbabwe) Onismor Bhasera
2014	(England) Reuben Reid
2015	(England) Luke McCormick
2016	(Republic of Ireland) Graham Carey
2017	(England) Sonny Bradley
2018	(Republic of Ireland) Graham Carey
2019	(Portugal) Rúben Lameiras
2020	(England) Antoni Sarcevic
2021	(England) Joe Edwards
2022	(England) Michael Cooper
2023	(England) Michael Cooper
2024	(England) Morgan Whittaker
2025	(Scotland) Ryan Hardie
2026	(England) Alex Mitchell

==== Young Player of the Year ====
Year	Winner
2012	(England) Luke Young
2013	(Republic of Ireland) Conor Hourihane
2014	(England) Curtis Nelson
2015	(England) Andy Kellett

Year	Winner
2016	
2017	(Cameroon) Arnold Garita
2018	(England) Zak Vyner
2019	(Wales) Luke Jephcott

Year	Winner
2020	(Wales) Luke Jephcott
2021	(England) Michael Cooper
2022	(England) Adam Randell

Year	Winner
2023	(England) Bali Mumba
2024	(England) Ashley Phillips
2025	(England) Darko Gyabi
2026	(England) Tegan Finn

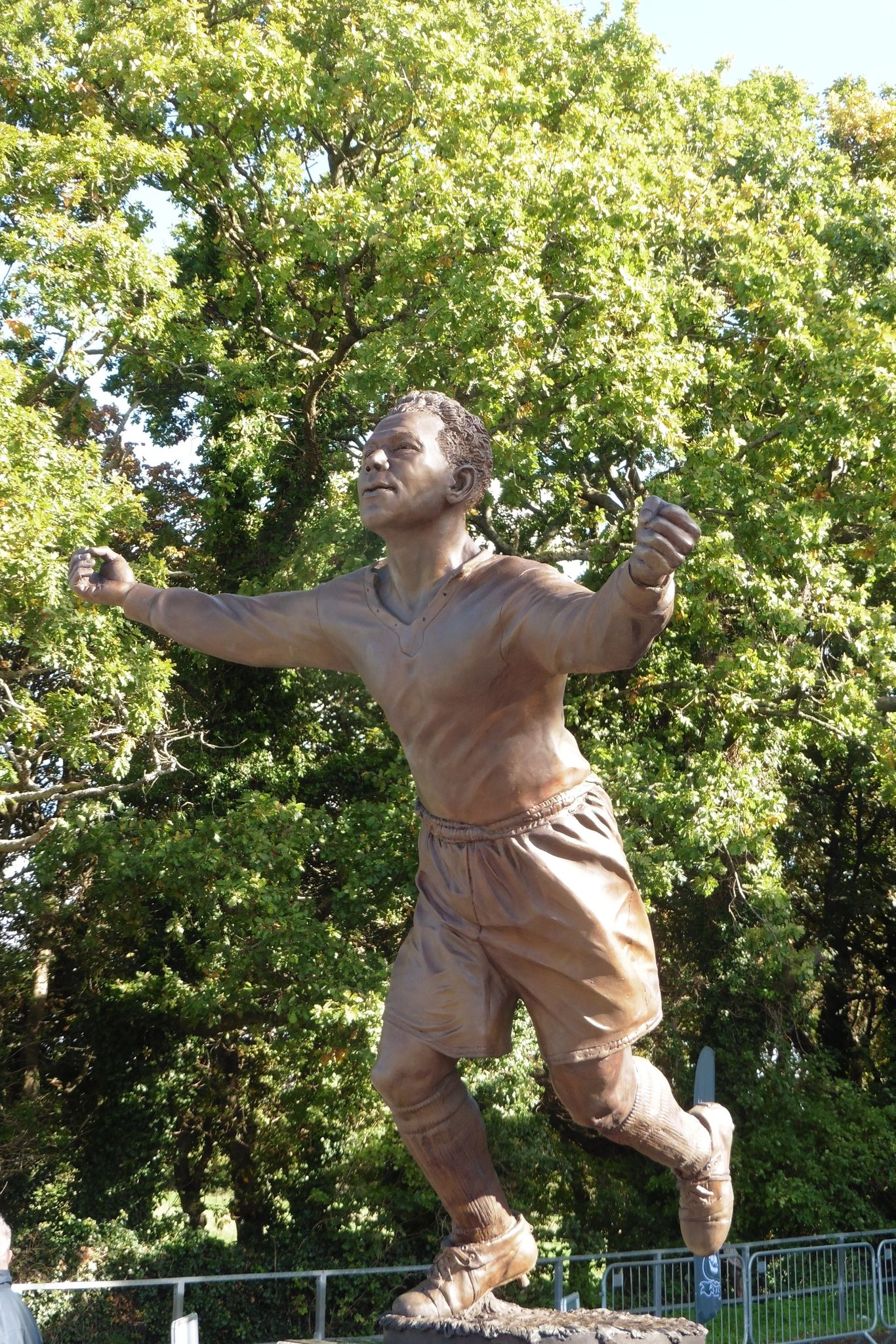
Jack Leslie statue outside of Home Park

=== Noted former players ===
For details on former players who have a Wikipedia article, see: Category:Plymouth Argyle F.C. players.

==== Team of the century ====
For the centenary celebrations, an all-time best team of Plymouth Argyle players was chosen by fans of the club.

1	GK	ENG	Jim Furnell
2	DF	ENG	Gordon Nisbet
3	DF	ENG	Jack Chisholm
4	DF	IRL	Graham Coughlan
5	DF	ENG	Colin Sullivan
6	MF	ENG	Kevin Hodges
7	MF	ENG	Johnny Williams
8	MF	ENG	Garry Nelson
9	FW	ENG	Tommy Tynan
10	FW	ENG	Paul Mariner
11	MF	SCO	Sammy Black

Manager: (Scotland) Paul Sturrock

== Club officials ==
=== Boardroom positions ===
Position	Name
Chairman	(England) Simon Hallett
Director	(England) Paul Berne
Director	(England) Jane Chafer
Director	(England) Richard Holliday
Director	(Wales) John Morgan
Director	(United States) Nick Giannotti

==== Ownership ====
In 2019, Simon Hallett raised his stake in the club to 97%, with Richard Holliday holding the remaining minority. In August 2022, an American investment group named Argyle Green, LLC purchased 20% of the club, and appointed Michael Mincberg to the board of directors. Among this consortium were NHL players Ondřej Palát and Victor Hedman, and NBA Executive Jon Horst.

Senior management team

Position	Name
Chief executive officer	Paul Berne
Sporting Director	(Scotland) Derek Adams
Head of Football Operations and Recruitment	(England) David Fox
Club secretary and head of human resources	Zac Newton
Head of venue, conferencing and events	Christian Kent
Head of marketing and communications	Alistair Cliffe

=== Football management ===
Position	Name
Head coach	(England) Tom Cleverley
Assistant head coach	(England) Damon Lathrope
First-team coach	(England) Matt Bevans
First-team coach and head of player development	(England) Kevin Nancekivell
Lead physical performance coach	(England) John Lucas
Goalkeeping coach	(England) Mike Stowell
First-team performance analyst	(England) Chris Douglas
Head of physiotherapy	(England) Gareth Law
Head of sports science	(England) Connor Derbidge
First-team physiotherapist	(England) Alex Kay
First-team rehabilitation sports therapist	(England) Sam Alfieri
Lead performance analyst	(England) Harry Powell
First-team analyst	(England) Charlie Nichols
Head of football data	(England) Matt Girdler
Assistant club secretary and player liaison officer	(England) Ellen Shine
Kit manager	(England) David Holt
Assistant kit manager	(England) Scott McCann
Club doctor	(Austria) Peter Pollok
First-team scout	(England) Charlie Allen
First-team scout	(England) Mark Emerson

=== Managerial history ===
- 1903 (England) Frank Brettell
- 1905 (Scotland) Bob Jack
- 1906 (Scotland) William Fullarton
- 1907 (United Kingdom) Committee
- 1910 (Scotland) Bob Jack
- 1938 (England) Jack Tresadern
- 1947 (Scotland) Jimmy Rae
- 1955 (England) Jack Rowley
- 1960 (Scotland) Neil Dougall
- 1961 (England) Ellis Stuttard
- 1963 (Scotland) Andy Beattie
- 1964 (England) Malcolm Allison
- 1965 (England) Derek Ufton
- 1968 (Northern Ireland) Billy Bingham
- 1970 (England) Ellis Stuttard
- 1972 (England) Tony Waiters
- 1977 (England) Mike Kelly
- 1978 (England) Malcolm Allison
- 1979 (England) Bobby Saxton
- 1981 (Scotland) Bobby Moncur
- 1983 (England) Johnny Hore
- 1984 (Scotland) Dave Smith
- 1988 (England) Ken Brown
- 1990 (England) David Kemp
- 1992 (England) Peter Shilton
- 1995 (England) Steve McCall
- 1995 (England) Neil Warnock
- 1997 (England) Mick Jones
- 1998 (England) Kevin Hodges
- 2000 (Scotland) Paul Sturrock
- 2004 (Scotland) Bobby Williamson
- 2005 (Wales) Tony Pulis
- 2006 (England) Ian Holloway
- 2007 (Scotland) Paul Sturrock
- 2009 (England) Paul Mariner
- 2010 (England) Peter Reid
- 2011 (Wales) Carl Fletcher
- 2013 (Republic of Ireland) John Sheridan
- 2015 (Scotland) Derek Adams
- 2019 (England) Ryan Lowe
- 2021 (England) Steven Schumacher
- 2024 (England) Ian Foster
- 2024 (England) Wayne Rooney
- 2025 (Bosnia and Herzegovina) Miron Muslić
- 2025 (England) Tom Cleverley

== Records and statistics ==
=== Club records ===
- Best FA Cup performance: Semi-final, 1983–84
- Best League Cup performance: Semi-final, 1964–65, 1973–74
- Best EFL Trophy performance: Runners-up: 2022–23
- Record attendance at Home Park: 43,596 vs. Aston Villa, Second Division, 10 October 1936
- Record unbeaten run: 25 games, April to December 1929
- Joint record victory:
  - 8-1 vs Millwall, Second Division, 16 January 1932, Home Park
  - 8-1 vs Hartlepool United, Second Division, 7 May 1994, Victoria Park
  - 7-0 vs Chesterfield, Second Division, 3 January 2004, Home Park
- Record League defeat: 0–9 vs. Stoke City, Second Division, 17 December 1960
- Most League points (2 for a win): 68, Third Division South, 1929–30
- Most League points (3 for a win): 102, Third Division, 2001–02
- Most League goals: 107, Third Division South, 1925–26 and Third Division South, 1951–52
- Most goals in a season: 33, Jack Cock, Third Division South, 1926–27
- Fastest five goals
  - Argyle defeated Chesterfield 7–0 at Home Park on 3 January 2004 in the Second Division; their joint record win. In the process they also broke the English record for the fastest five goals scored in a professional game–after just 17 minutes.

=== Most appearances ===
Rank	Player	Career	Apps	Goals
1	(England) Kevin Hodges	1978–1992	620	87
2	(Scotland) Sammy Black	1924–1938	491	184
3	(England) Paul Wotton	1995–2008; 2012–2015	491	66
4	(Scotland) Fred Craig	1912–1915; 1919–1930	467	5
5	(England) Johnny Williams	1955–1966	448	55
6	(England) Johnny Hore	1965–1975	441	17
7	(England) Pat Jones	1947–1958	441	2
8	(Republic of Ireland) Michael Evans	1990–1997; 2001–2006	432	81
9	(England) Jack Leslie	1921–1934	401	136
10	(Wales) Moses Russell	1914–1915; 1919–1930	400	6

=== Most goals ===
Rank	Player	Career	Goals	Apps
1	(Scotland) Sammy Black	1924–1938	184	491
2	(England) Wilf Carter	1957–1964	148	275
3	(England) Tommy Tynan	1983–1985; 1986–1990	145	310
4	(England) Jack Leslie	1921–1934	136	401
5	(England) Maurice Tadman	1947–1955	112	253
6	(England) Jack Vidler	1929–1939	103	256
7	(England) Freddie Burch	1906–1915	92	239
8	(England) Kevin Hodges	1978–1992	87	620
9	(England) Ray Bowden	1927–1933	85	153
10	(Republic of Ireland) Mickey Evans	1990–1997; 2001–2006	81	432

== Honours ==
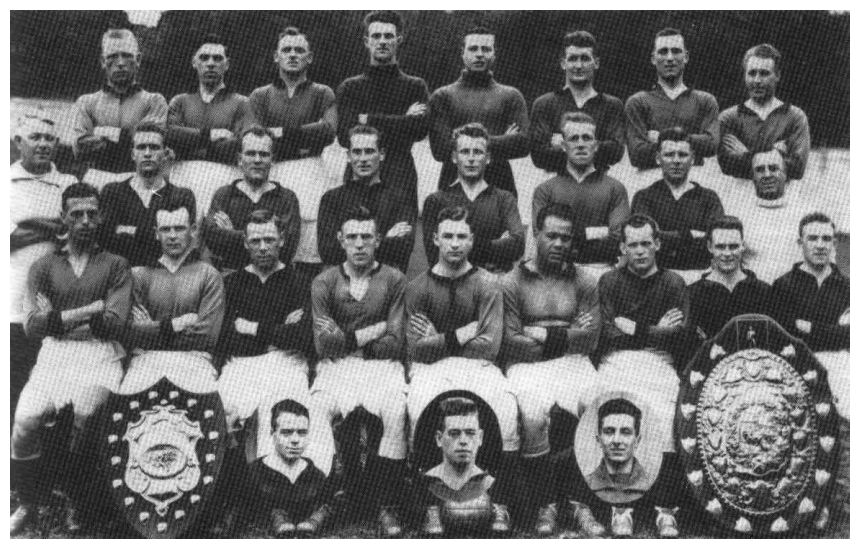
1929–30 Third Division winning squad.

League

- Third Division South / Third Division / Second Division / League One (level 3)
  - Champions: 1929–30, 1951–52, 1958–59, 2003–04, 2022–23
  - Runners-up: 1921–22, 1922–23, 1923–24, 1924–25, 1925–26, 1926–27, 1974–75, 1985–86
- Third Division / League Two (level 4)
  - Champions: 2001–02
  - Runners-up: 2016–17
  - Promoted: 2019–20
  - Play-off winners: 1996
- Southern League (Note: From 1890 to 1920, the top division of non-League football was the Southern League Division One, which acted as the third tier being only one division below the Football League Second Division, however automatic promotion from non-League to the Football League was not put in place until the mid 1980s.)
  - Champions: 1912–13
- Western League
  - Champions: 1904–05

Cup

- EFL Trophy
  - Runners-up: 2022–23
