= List of Plymouth Argyle F.C. seasons =

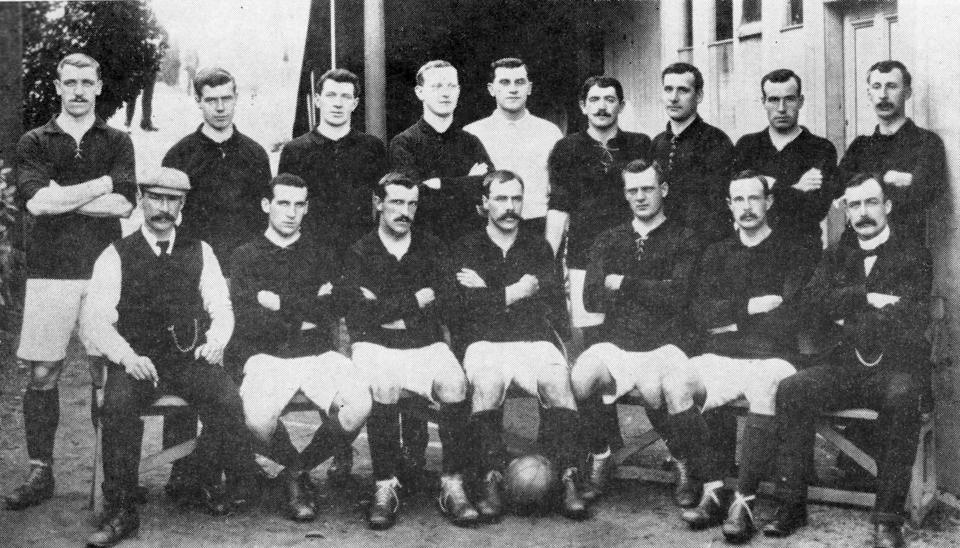
The Plymouth Argyle squad for the 1903–04 season in the Southern Football League, their first as a professional club

Plymouth Argyle Football Club is an English association football club based in Plymouth, Devon. They compete in League One, the third tier of the English football league system, as of the 2025–26 season. The club was founded in 1886 as Argyle Football Club. At this time, there was no League football, so matches were arranged on an ad hoc basis, supplemented by cup competitions. In January 1903, the club became a limited company and changed their name to Plymouth Argyle F.C. Election to the Southern League followed in March, as the club gained direct entry to the First Division for the 1903–04 season. The club were also invited to compete in the Western League, a competition which was considered secondary to the Southern League.

Argyle finished as runners-up in 1908 and 1912, before winning the League championship for the first time in 1913. The club harboured ambitions on entering the Second Division of the Football League before competitive football was put on-hold in May 1915 due to the First World War. The Southern League resumed in August 1919, but it was to be Argyle's last season as a member before the League's top division was absorbed by the Football League to create the Third Division ahead of the 1920–21 season. A year later, more clubs were added to the division and it was split in two, Third Division North and Third Division South. Argyle were placed in the latter.

The club finished as runners-up for six consecutive seasons between 1922 and 1927, before finally winning the League championship in the 1929–30 season, and promotion to the Second Division for the first time. Argyle remained there for almost twenty years before returning to the Third Division South in 1950. The club won the League championship again in the 1951–52 season, and Argyle's best season to date followed a year later. They finished fourth in the Second Division and reached the fifth round of the FA Cup. The club were relegated again in 1956 before winning another League title in the 1958–59 season, in the re-unified Third Division. Argyle's stay in the second tier of English football this time lasted almost a decade until they were relegated again in 1968. The club were promoted from the Third Division once more in 1975 as runners-up, the first time they had done so without ending the season as champions. Argyle reached the semi-finals of the FA Cup for the first time in April 1984, and were promoted from the Third Division as runners-up again in the 1985–86 season.

Plymouth Argyle Performances from 1920 until 2023

Argyle were relegated to the fourth tier of English football for the first time in their history at the end of the 1994–95 season, but earned promotion again the following year, this time at Wembley Stadium in the 1996 Third Division play-off final. The club won their first League championship in forty-three years at the end of the 2001–02 season, breaking numerous records in the process, including a Third Division record points tally of 102. Argyle conceded just 28 League goals that season and kept 27 clean sheets in 46 matches. Two years later, the club won the Second Division of the Football League and promotion back to the second tier, which was renamed the Championship by the League's board in the summer of 2004. Argyle's success in the 2003–04 season took their tally of titles in the third tier of English football to four, which is a divisional record. Up to the end of the 2025–26 season, Plymouth Argyle Football Club has played 42 seasons in the second tier of English football, 45 seasons in the third, and 12 seasons in the fourth. The table details their achievements in all senior first team competitions, their top goalscorer(s), and average home league attendance for each completed season since their professional debut on 1 September 1903.

== Table key ==
Key to divisions:

- SL Div 1 = Southern League First Division
- WL Div 1 = Western League First Division
- Div 3 = Football League Third Division
- Div 3S = Football League Third Division South
- Div 2 = Football League Second Division
- FLS = Football League South
- Champ = EFL Championship
- Lge 1 = EFL League One
- Lge 2 = EFL League Two

Key to league record:

- Pld = Matches played
- W = Matches won
- D = Matches drawn
- L = Matches lost
- GF = Goals for
- GA = Goals against
- Pts = Points gained
- Pos = Final position

Key to rounds:

- R1 = First round
- R2 = Second round
- R3 = Third round
- R4 = Fourth round, etc.
- QF = Quarter-finals
- SF = Semi-finals
- RU = Runners-up
- GR = Group stage
- NA = Not applicable

| Winners* | Runners-up^{¤} | Play-offs^{†} | Promoted ↑ | Relegated ↓ | Top scorer in Argyle's division^{‡} |

== Seasons ==
| Season | Division | Pld | W | D | L | GF | GA | Pts | Pos | FA Cup | EFL Cup (Note: The Football League Cup competition started in the 1960–61 season.) | Competition | Result | Player(s) | Goals | Average attendance (Note: League matches only (including Southern League and Football League, but excluding Western League and play-off matches). Sourced from Danes, Complete Record, up to and including the 2008–09 season, and from the Football League website thereafter.) | Notes |
| Season | League (Note: Records from all domestic league competitions are sourced to Danes, Complete Record, up to and including the 2008–09 season, and to Statto, and Football Club History Database, as appropriate thereafter. Wartime competitions are listed at RSSSF.) | | | | | | | | | FA Cup | EFL Cup | Other (Note: Records from other domestic cup competitions are sourced to Danes, Complete Record, up to and including the 2008–09 season, and to Statto, and Football Club History Database, as appropriate thereafter.) | | Top scorer(s) (Note: Includes goals scored in the Southern League, Western League, Football League (including play-off matches), FA Cup, League Cup, Associate Members' Cup/Football League Trophy, and several now-defunct competitions, such as the Anglo-Scottish Cup, Football League Group Cup, and Full Members' Cup.) | | Average attendance | Notes |
|---|---|---|---|---|---|---|---|---|---|---|---|---|---|---|---|---|---|
| 1903–04 | SL Div 1 WL Div 1 | 34 16 | 13 8 | 10 4 | 11 4 | 44 22 | 34 18 | 36 20 | 9th 3rd | R1 | — | — | — | Jack Peddie | 21 | 7,517 | (Note: Jack Peddie scored the clubs first professional goal on 1 September 1903 against West Ham United in the Western League. He scored the club's first Southern League goal four days later against Northampton Town.) |
| 1904–05 | SL Div 1 WL Div 1 | 34 20 | 18 13 | 5 4 | 11 3 | 57 52 | 39 18 | 41 30 | 4th 1st* | R1 | — | — | — | Jack Picken | 29 | 7,964 | — |
| 1905–06 | SL Div 1 WL Div 1 | 34 20 | 16 8 | 7 8 | 11 4 | 52 34 | 33 23 | 39 24 | 6th 3rd | R2 | — | — | — | Harry Wilcox | 25 | 6,147 | — |
| 1906–07 | SL Div 1 WL Div 1 | 38 10 | 10 5 | 13 3 | 15 2 | 43 16 | 50 10 | 33 13 | 15th 2nd^{¤} | R1 | — | — | — | Herbert Swann | 15 | 5,578 | (Note: Herbert Swann scored all five goals in a 5–0 home win against Millwall in the Western League on 31 October 1906.) |
| 1907–08 | SL Div 1 WL Div 1 | 38 12 | 19 5 | 11 2 | 8 5 | 50 14 | 31 14 | 49 12 | 2nd^{¤} 4th | R2 | — | — | — | Harry Ingham | 14 | 8,537 | — |
| 1908–09 | SL Div 1 WL Div 1 | 40 12 | 15 6 | 10 1 | 15 5 | 46 12 | 47 13 | 40 13 | 10th 3rd | R3 | — | — | — | Tommy Hakin | 17 | 5,900 | — |
| 1909–10 | SL Div 1 | 42 | 16 | 11 | 15 | 61 | 54 | 43 | 11th | R1 | — | — | — | Jimmy Hindmarsh | 15 | 4,778 | — |
| 1910–11 | SL Div 1 | 38 | 15 | 9 | 14 | 54 | 55 | 39 | 8th | R1 | — | — | — | Harry Raymond | 12 | 6,140 | — |
| 1911–12 | SL Div 1 | 38 | 23 | 6 | 9 | 63 | 31 | 52 | 2nd^{¤} | R1 | — | — | — | John Boden | 20 | 7,441 | — |
| 1912–13 | SL Div 1 | 38 | 22 | 6 | 10 | 77 | 36 | 50 | 1st* | R2 | — | — | — | Fred Burch | 28 | 8,173 | — |
| 1913–14 | SL Div 1 | 38 | 15 | 13 | 10 | 46 | 42 | 43 | 5th | R2 | — | — | — | Fred Burch | 14 | 9,253 | — |
| 1914–15 | SL Div 1 | 38 | 8 | 14 | 16 | 51 | 61 | 30 | 17th | R1 | — | — | — | Fred Burch | 15 | 4,250 | — |
| 1915–19 | The Southern League and FA Cup were suspended until after the First World War. | | | | | | | | | | | | | | | | (Note: During the war, the only football played at the clubs Home Park ground was military-based. It was used by service teams stationed at HMNB Devonport, who organised regular matches during the conflict.) |
| 1919–20 | SL Div 1 | 42 | 20 | 10 | 12 | 56 | 29 | 50 | 5th | R3 | — | — | — | David Jack Billy Kellock | 12 | 11,195 | (Note: Having left the club eight years earlier, David Jack became the worlds most expensive footballer when he joined Arsenal for £10,890 from Bolton Wanderers.) |
| 1920–21 | Div 3 | 42 | 11 | 21 | 10 | 35 | 34 | 43 | 11th | R3 | — | — | — | Harry Raymond | 7 | 13,714 | (Note: The Football League expanded its membership at the end of the 1919–20 season by forming a Third Division. All but one of the 22 Southern League First Division clubs were included in the new league, with the exception being Cardiff City, who were elected to the Second Division at the expense of Grimsby Town.) |
| 1921–22 | Div 3S | 42 | 25 | 11 | 6 | 63 | 24 | 61 | 2nd^{¤} | R1 | — | — | — | Frank Richardson | 31^{‡} | 14,809 | (Note: The Football League expanded its membership again at the end of the 1920–21 season when it created an extra division for clubs based in the North. The existing division was therefore split in two and called the Third Division South, and Third Division North, respectively.) (Note: The club finished level on points with Southampton at the top of the table, but missed out on promotion by goal average. Only the league champion gained promotion to the Second Division at the time.) (Note: Frank Richardson scored 31 goals in the Third Division South.) |
| 1922–23 | Div 3S | 42 | 23 | 7 | 12 | 61 | 29 | 53 | 2nd^{¤} | R3 | — | — | — | Jack Fowler | 17 | 11,024 | — |
| 1923–24 | Div 3S | 42 | 23 | 9 | 10 | 70 | 34 | 55 | 2nd^{¤} | R1 | — | — | — | Percy Cherrett | 27 | 11,200 | — |
| 1924–25 | Div 3S | 42 | 23 | 10 | 9 | 77 | 38 | 56 | 2nd^{¤} | R1 | — | — | — | Jack Leslie | 14 | 12,610 | — |
| 1925–26 | Div 3S | 42 | 24 | 8 | 10 | 107 | 67 | 56 | 2nd^{¤} | R3 | — | — | — | Jack Cock | 32^{‡} | 13,815 | (Note: Jack Cock scored 32 goals in the Third Division South.) |
| 1926–27 | Div 3S | 42 | 25 | 10 | 7 | 95 | 61 | 60 | 2nd^{¤} | R3 | — | — | — | Jack Cock | 33 | 11,263 | (Note: The club finished two points behind Bristol City to make it six successive league finishes as runner-up, which left supporters questioning the team's desire for Second Division football.) |
| 1927–28 | Div 3S | 42 | 23 | 7 | 12 | 85 | 54 | 53 | 3rd | R1 | — | — | — | Sammy Black | 16 | 10,223 | — |
| 1928–29 | Div 3S | 42 | 20 | 12 | 10 | 83 | 51 | 52 | 4th | R4 | — | — | — | Ray Bowden Jack Leslie | 22 | 10,808 | — |
| 1929–30 | Div 3S ↑ | 42 | 30 | 8 | 4 | 98 | 38 | 68 | 1st* | R3 | — | — | — | Sammy Black | 24 | 15,232 | (Note: Promoted to the second tier of English football for the first time. The team went undefeated until Christmas Day, and were confirmed as Third Division South champions by Easter.) |
| 1930–31 | Div 2 | 42 | 14 | 8 | 20 | 76 | 84 | 36 | 18th | R3 | — | — | — | Sammy Black | 20 | 19,261 | — |
| 1931–32 | Div 2 | 42 | 20 | 9 | 13 | 100 | 66 | 49 | 4th | R4 | — | — | — | Jack Leslie | 21 | 19,520 | — |
| 1932–33 | Div 2 | 42 | 16 | 9 | 17 | 63 | 67 | 41 | 14th | R3 | — | — | — | Sammy Black | 13 | 17,465 | — |
| 1933–34 | Div 2 | 42 | 15 | 13 | 14 | 69 | 70 | 43 | 10th | R3 | — | — | — | Jimmy Cookson | 28 | 15,454 | — |
| 1934–35 | Div 2 | 42 | 19 | 8 | 15 | 75 | 64 | 46 | 8th | R4 | — | — | — | Jack Vidler | 21 | 13,787 | — |
| 1935–36 | Div 2 | 42 | 20 | 8 | 14 | 71 | 57 | 48 | 7th | R4 | — | — | — | Sammy Black | 16 | 16,107 | — |
| 1936–37 | Div 2 | 42 | 18 | 13 | 11 | 71 | 53 | 49 | 5th | R4 | — | — | — | Jack Connor | 17 | 21,476 | — |
| 1937–38 | Div 2 | 42 | 14 | 12 | 16 | 57 | 65 | 40 | 13th | R3 | — | — | — | Bill Hullett | 10 | 18,550 | (Note: Bill Hullett scored 10 goals in 11 matches this season after signing from Everton.) |
| 1938–39 | Div 2 | 42 | 15 | 8 | 19 | 49 | 55 | 38 | 15th | R3 | — | — | — | Bill Hullett | 10 | 16,847 | — |
| 1939–40 | Div 2 | 3 | 2 | 0 | 1 | 4 | 3 | 4 | 5th | NA | — | — | — | — | — | — | (Note: League football was abandoned after three games because of the Second World War.) |
| 1940–45 | The Football League and FA Cup were suspended until after the Second World War. | | | | | | | | | | | | | | | | (Note: The club played out the 1939–40 season in regional league and cup competitions, before they were forced to withdraw from competitive football as the war intensified. Guest players were permitted, and results and records from this period are not included in official statistics.) |
| 1945–46 | FLS | 42 | 3 | 8 | 31 | 39 | 120 | 14 | 22nd | R3 | — | — | — | — | — | — | (Note: The FA Cup was contested in 1945–46, but the Football League proper did not resume until the following season. However, 1945–46 did see the only full season played in the wartime Football League North and South regionalised competition; this included First and Second Division clubs divided geographically, playing each other home and away. The club were able to take part despite the city of Plymouth in ruins, but they often struggled to assemble 11 fit players on a Saturday, so it was no surprise that they managed just three wins from 42 matches. In all, 72 players represented the club that season.) (Note: From the first round proper to the sixth round of the 1945–46 FA Cup, matches were played over two legs.) |
| 1946–47 | Div 2 | 42 | 14 | 5 | 23 | 79 | 96 | 33 | 19th | R3 | — | — | — | Dave Thomas | 19 | 23,290 | (Note: Dave Thomas scored one goal in 10 consecutive matches this season.) |
| 1947–48 | Div 2 | 42 | 9 | 20 | 13 | 40 | 58 | 38 | 17th | R3 | — | — | — | Ernie Edds | 14 | 23,239 | — |
| 1948–49 | Div 2 | 42 | 12 | 12 | 18 | 49 | 64 | 36 | 20th | R3 | — | — | — | Maurice Tadman | 15 | 22,648 | — |
| 1949–50 | Div 2 ↓ | 42 | 8 | 16 | 18 | 44 | 65 | 32 | 21st | R3 | — | — | — | Bill Strauss | 10 | 22,054 | — |
| 1950–51 | Div 3S | 46 | 24 | 9 | 13 | 85 | 55 | 57 | 4th | R3 | — | — | — | Maurice Tadman | 26 | 16,347 | — |
| 1951–52 | Div 3S ↑ | 46 | 29 | 8 | 9 | 107 | 53 | 66 | 1st* | R1 | — | — | — | Maurice Tadman | 27 | 19,126 | — |
| 1952–53 | Div 2 | 42 | 20 | 9 | 13 | 65 | 60 | 49 | 4th | R5 | — | — | — | Maurice Tadman | 15 | 22,813 | — |
| 1953–54 | Div 2 | 42 | 9 | 16 | 17 | 65 | 82 | 34 | 19th | R4 | — | — | — | Maurice Tadman | 12 | 19,501 | — |
| 1954–55 | Div 2 | 42 | 12 | 7 | 23 | 57 | 82 | 31 | 20th | R3 | — | — | — | Peter Anderson Eric Davis Johnny Porteous | 8 | 19,259 | — |
| 1955–56 | Div 2 ↓ | 42 | 10 | 8 | 24 | 54 | 87 | 28 | 21st | R3 | — | — | — | Neil Langman | 9 | 17,122 | — |
| 1956–57 | Div 3S | 46 | 16 | 11 | 19 | 68 | 73 | 43 | 18th | R2 | — | — | — | Neil Langman | 18 | 12,127 | — |
| 1957–58 | Div 3S | 46 | 25 | 8 | 13 | 67 | 48 | 58 | 3rd | R3 | — | — | — | Wilf Carter | 32 | 19,506 | — |
| 1958–59 | Div 3 ↑ | 46 | 23 | 16 | 7 | 89 | 59 | 62 | 1st* | R3 | — | — | — | Wilf Carter | 25 | 22,881 | (Note: Having finished in the top half of the league in the previous season, the club were placed in the newly united Third Division following the amalgamation of the Third Division North and Third Division South.) |
| 1959–60 | Div 2 | 42 | 13 | 9 | 20 | 61 | 89 | 35 | 19th | R3 | — | — | — | Wilf Carter | 22 | 20,354 | — |
| 1960–61 | Div 2 | 42 | 17 | 8 | 17 | 81 | 82 | 42 | 11th | R3 | R4 | — | — | Wilf Carter | 28 | 17,646 | (Note: Wilf Carter scored 5 goals in the 6–4 win against Charlton Athletic in the Second Division on 27 December 1960 at Home Park, just one day after they lost to Athletic 6–4 at The Valley.) |
| 1961–62 | Div 2 | 42 | 19 | 8 | 15 | 75 | 75 | 46 | 5th | R4 | R1 | — | — | Wilf Carter | 20 | 14,008 | — |
| 1962–63 | Div 2 | 42 | 15 | 12 | 15 | 76 | 73 | 42 | 12th | R3 | R2 | — | — | Wilf Carter | 14 | 15,727 | — |
| 1963–64 | Div 2 | 42 | 8 | 16 | 18 | 45 | 67 | 32 | 20th | R3 | R2 | — | — | Frank Lord | 8 | 12,902 | (Note: Having finished level on points with Grimsby Town, the club avoided relegation on goal average.) |
| 1964–65 | Div 2 | 42 | 16 | 8 | 18 | 63 | 79 | 40 | 15th | R4 | SF | — | — | Frank Lord Mike Trebilcock | 17 | 14,652 | (Note: The club's first appearance in the semi-finals of the League Cup. They lost 4–2 on aggregate to Leicester City and went out at the same stage eight years later, losing 3–1 on aggregate against Manchester City.) |
| 1965–66 | Div 2 | 42 | 12 | 13 | 17 | 54 | 63 | 37 | 18th | R4 | R2 | — | — | Mike Bickle | 12 | 13,076 | — |
| 1966–67 | Div 2 | 42 | 14 | 9 | 19 | 59 | 58 | 37 | 16th | R3 | R2 | — | — | Mike Bickle | 13 | 14,235 | — |
| 1967–68 | Div 2 ↓ | 42 | 9 | 9 | 24 | 38 | 72 | 27 | 22nd | R3 | R2 | — | — | Mike Bickle | 10 | 10,667 | — |
| 1968–69 | Div 3 | 46 | 17 | 15 | 14 | 53 | 49 | 49 | 5th | R1 | R1 | — | — | Mike Bickle | 12 | 10,590 | — |
| 1969–70 | Div 3 | 46 | 16 | 11 | 19 | 56 | 64 | 43 | 17th | R2 | R1 | — | — | Mike Bickle | 18 | 9,113 | — |
| 1970–71 | Div 3 | 46 | 12 | 19 | 15 | 63 | 63 | 43 | 15th | R1 | R1 | — | — | Don Hutchins | 11 | 8,704 | — |
| 1971–72 | Div 3 | 46 | 20 | 10 | 16 | 74 | 64 | 50 | 8th | R1 | R2 | — | — | Derek Rickard | 14 | 10,828 | — |
| 1972–73 | Div 3 | 46 | 20 | 10 | 16 | 74 | 66 | 50 | 8th | R4 | R1 | — | — | Alan Welsh | 13 | 9,048 | — |
| 1973–74 | Div 3 | 46 | 17 | 10 | 19 | 59 | 54 | 44 | 17th | R3 | SF | — | — | Steve Davey | 19 | 7,769 | — |
| 1974–75 | Div 3 ↑ | 46 | 24 | 11 | 11 | 79 | 58 | 59 | 2nd^{¤} | R4 | R1 | — | — | Billy Rafferty | 26 | 14,056 | (Note: The first time that the club had been promoted in the Football League without winning the title, benefitting from the three-up, three-down promotion and relegation system that was in place at the time.) |
| 1975–76 | Div 2 | 42 | 13 | 12 | 17 | 48 | 54 | 38 | 16th | R3 | R2 | — | — | Paul Mariner | 16 | 14,800 | — |
| 1976–77 | Div 2 ↓ | 42 | 8 | 16 | 18 | 46 | 65 | 32 | 21st | R3 | R1 | — | — | Brian Hall | 10 | 13,328 | (Note: The criteria for separating clubs finishing on the same number of points was changed ahead of this season from goal average (goals scored divided by goals conceded) to goal difference (the difference between goals scored and goals conceded).) |
| 1977–78 | Div 3 | 46 | 11 | 17 | 18 | 61 | 68 | 39 | 19th | R3 | R1 | Anglo-Scottish Cup | GR | Terry Austin | 13 | 6,752 | — |
| 1978–79 | Div 3 | 46 | 15 | 14 | 17 | 67 | 68 | 44 | 15th | R1 | R2 | — | — | Fred Binney | 28 | 7,524 | — |
| 1979–80 | Div 3 | 46 | 16 | 12 | 18 | 59 | 55 | 44 | 15th | R1 | R3 | Anglo-Scottish Cup | GR | David Kemp | 15 | 5,775 | — |
| 1980–81 | Div 3 | 46 | 19 | 14 | 13 | 56 | 44 | 52 | 7th | R3 | R1 | — | — | David Kemp | 28 | 6,761 | — |
| 1981–82 | Div 3 | 46 | 18 | 11 | 17 | 64 | 56 | 65 | 10th | R1 | R2 | Football League Group Cup | GR | John Sims | 19 | 4,792 | (Note: This season saw the introduction of three points for a win instead of two.) |
| 1982–83 | Div 3 | 46 | 19 | 8 | 19 | 61 | 66 | 65 | 8th | R3 | R1 | — | — | John Sims | 14 | 4,537 | — |
| 1983–84 | Div 3 | 46 | 13 | 12 | 21 | 56 | 62 | 51 | 19th | SF | R2 | Associate Members' Cup | SF | Tommy Tynan | 20 | 5,335 | (Note: The club's first appearance in the semi-finals of the FA Cup. They lost 1–0 to Watford at Villa Park. Argyle would go on to reach the quarter-finals in 2007 and lost to the same opponents by the same scoreline.) |
| 1984–85 | Div 3 | 46 | 15 | 14 | 17 | 62 | 65 | 59 | 15th | R2 | R2 | Associate Members' Cup | R1 | Tommy Tynan | 32^{‡} | 5,131 | (Note: Tommy Tynan scored 31 goals in the Third Division.) |
| 1985–86 | Div 3 ↑ | 46 | 26 | 9 | 11 | 88 | 53 | 87 | 2nd^{¤} | R3 | R1 | Associate Members' Cup | GR | Kevin Hodges | 16 | 8,085 | — |
| 1986–87 | Div 2 | 42 | 16 | 13 | 13 | 62 | 57 | 61 | 7th | R4 | R1 | Full Members' Cup | R1 | Tommy Tynan | 20 | 12,391 | — |
| 1987–88 | Div 2 | 44 | 16 | 8 | 20 | 65 | 67 | 56 | 16th | R5 | R2 | Full Members' Cup | R1 | Tommy Tynan | 19 | 10,266 | — |
| 1988–89 | Div 2 | 46 | 14 | 12 | 20 | 55 | 66 | 54 | 18th | R4 | R2 | Full Members' Cup | R1 | Tommy Tynan | 26 | 8,627 | — |
| 1989–90 | Div 2 | 46 | 14 | 13 | 19 | 58 | 63 | 55 | 16th | R3 | R2 | Full Members' Cup | R2 | Tommy Tynan | 18 | 8,722 | — |
| 1990–91 | Div 2 | 46 | 12 | 17 | 17 | 54 | 68 | 53 | 18th | R3 | R3 | Full Members' Cup | R1 | Robbie Turner | 14 | 6,850 | — |
| 1991–92 | Div 2 ↓ | 46 | 13 | 9 | 24 | 42 | 64 | 48 | 22nd | R3 | R1 | Full Members' Cup | QF | Dwight Marshall | 15 | 6,738 | — |
| 1992–93 | Div 2 | 46 | 16 | 12 | 18 | 59 | 64 | 60 | 14th | R3 | R3 | Football League Trophy | GR | Steve Castle Paul Dalton Kevin Nugent | 13 | 6,377 | (Note: The Third Division of the Football League became the Second Division after all clubs in the First Division broke away in order to form the FA Premier League.) |
| 1993–94 | Div 2 | 46 | 25 | 10 | 11 | 88 | 56 | 85 | 3rd^{†} | R4 | R1 | Football League Trophy | GR | Steve Castle | 22 | 9,357 | (Note: First appearance in the play-offs, lost in the semi-finals to Burnley, 3–1 on aggregate.) |
| 1994–95 | Div 2 ↓ | 46 | 12 | 10 | 24 | 45 | 83 | 46 | 21st | R3 | R1 | Football League Trophy | GR | Richard Landon Kevin Nugent | 7 | 5,832 | (Note: Relegated to the fourth tier of English football for the first time.) |
| 1995–96 | Div 3 ↑ | 46 | 22 | 12 | 12 | 68 | 49 | 78 | 4th^{†} | R3 | R1 | Football League Trophy | GR | Adrian Littlejohn | 18 | 7,440 | (Note: Promoted to the Second Division via the play-offs, beating Colchester United 3–2 on aggregate in the semi-finals, and Darlington 1–0 in the final.) |
| 1996–97 | Div 2 | 46 | 12 | 18 | 16 | 47 | 58 | 54 | 19th | R3 | R1 | Football League Trophy | QF | Mickey Evans | 15 | 6,494 | — |
| 1997–98 | Div 2 ↓ | 46 | 12 | 13 | 21 | 55 | 70 | 49 | 22nd | R1 | R1 | Football League Trophy | R1 | Carlo Corazzin | 17 | 5,322 | — |
| 1998–99 | Div 3 | 46 | 17 | 10 | 19 | 58 | 54 | 61 | 13th | R3 | R1 | Football League Trophy | R1 | Dwight Marshall | 12 | 5,322 | — |
| 1999–2000 | Div 3 | 46 | 16 | 18 | 12 | 55 | 51 | 66 | 12th | R4 | R1 | Football League Trophy | R2 | Paul McGregor | 16 | 5,371 | — |
| 2000–01 | Div 3 | 46 | 15 | 13 | 18 | 54 | 61 | 58 | 12th | R1 | R1 | Football League Trophy | R2 | Ian Stonebridge | 12 | 4,944 | — |
| 2001–02 | Div 3 ↑ | 46 | 31 | 9 | 6 | 71 | 28 | 102 | 1st* | R2 | R1 | Football League Trophy | R1 | Graham Coughlan David Friio | 11 | 8,788 | (Note: The club won the Third Division championship with 102 points in the 2001–02 season, which is a record for that division.) |
| 2002–03 | Div 2 | 46 | 17 | 14 | 15 | 63 | 52 | 65 | 8th | R3 | R1 | Football League Trophy | R2 | Marino Keith | 12 | 8,980 | — |
| 2003–04 | Div 2 ↑ | 46 | 26 | 12 | 8 | 85 | 41 | 90 | 1st* | R1 | R1 | Football League Trophy | R2 | David Friio | 15 | 12,654 | — |
| 2004–05 | Champ | 46 | 14 | 11 | 21 | 52 | 64 | 53 | 17th | R3 | R1 | — | — | Paul Wotton | 13 | 16,419 | (Note: The First Division was renamed the Championship from the 2004–05 season.) |
| 2005–06 | Champ | 46 | 13 | 17 | 16 | 39 | 46 | 56 | 14th | R3 | R2 | — | — | Paul Wotton | 9 | 13,776 | — |
| 2006–07 | Champ | 46 | 17 | 16 | 13 | 63 | 62 | 67 | 11th | QF | R1 | — | — | Barry Hayles | 14 | 13,011 | — |
| 2007–08 | Champ | 46 | 17 | 13 | 16 | 60 | 50 | 64 | 10th | R4 | R3 | — | — | Sylvan Ebanks-Blake | 13^{‡} | 13,000 | (Note: Sylvan Ebanks-Blake scored 23 goals in the Championship, 11 for Plymouth Argyle, and 12 for Wolverhampton Wanderers.) |
| 2008–09 | Champ | 46 | 13 | 12 | 21 | 44 | 57 | 51 | 21st | R3 | R1 | — | — | Paul Gallagher | 13 | 11,533 | — |
| 2009–10 | Champ ↓ | 46 | 11 | 8 | 27 | 43 | 68 | 41 | 23rd | R3 | R1 | — | — | Jamie Mackie | 8 | 10,316 | — |
| 2010–11 | Lge 1 ↓ | 46 | 15 | 7 | 24 | 51 | 74 | 42 | 23rd | R1 | R1 | Football League Trophy | QF | Bradley Wright-Phillips | 13 | 8,613 | (Note: The club was docked ten points by the Football League for issuing a notice of intention to appoint an administrator.) |
| 2011–12 | Lge 2 | 46 | 10 | 16 | 20 | 47 | 64 | 46 | 21st | R1 | R1 | Football League Trophy | R1 | Simon Walton | 9 | 6,915 | — |
| 2012–13 | Lge 2 | 46 | 13 | 13 | 20 | 46 | 55 | 52 | 21st | R1 | R2 | Football League Trophy | QF | Jason Banton | 6 | 7,095 | — |
| 2013–14 | Lge 2 | 46 | 16 | 12 | 18 | 51 | 58 | 60 | 10th | R3 | R1 | Football League Trophy | R2 | Reuben Reid | 21 | 7,304 | — |
| 2014–15 | Lge 2 | 46 | 20 | 11 | 15 | 55 | 37 | 71 | 7th^{†} | R2 | R1 | Football League Trophy | S/F | Reuben Reid | 20 | 7,693 | — |
| 2015–16 | Lge 2 | 46 | 24 | 9 | 13 | 72 | 46 | 81 | 5th^{†} | R1 | R1 | Football League Trophy | Q/F | Jake Jervis | 14 | 8,841 | — |
| 2016–17 | Lge 2 ↑ | 46 | 26 | 9 | 11 | 71 | 46 | 87 | 2nd^{¤} | R3 | R1 | EFL Trophy | GR | Graham Carey | 15 | 10,649 | — |
| 2017–18 | Lge 1 | 46 | 19 | 11 | 16 | 58 | 59 | 68 | 7th | R2 | R1 | EFL Trophy | GR | Graham Carey | 16 | 10,413 | — |
| 2018–19 | Lge 1 ↓ | 46 | 13 | 11 | 22 | 56 | 80 | 50 | 21st | R2 | R2 | EFL Trophy | GR | Freddie Ladapo | 18 | 9,847 | — |
| 2019–20 | Lge 2 ↑ | 37 | 20 | 8 | 9 | 61 | 39 | 68 | 3rd | R2 | R2 | EFL Trophy | GR | Antoni Sarcevic | 10 | 10,086 | (Note: The 2019–20 season was curtailed due to the COVID-19 pandemic, with league positions decided on a points-per-game basis. Plymouth Argyle averaged 1.84 points from 37 games.) |
| 2020–21 | Lge 1 | 46 | 14 | 11 | 21 | 53 | 80 | 53 | 18th | R4 | R2 | EFL Trophy | GR | Luke Jephcott | 18 | 1,808 | (Note: Most of Plymouth Argyle's home games in the 2020–21 season were played behind closed doors due to the COVID-19 pandemic. One home game against Ipswich Town was limited to 2,000 spectators.) |
| 2021–22 | Lge 1 | 46 | 23 | 11 | 12 | 68 | 48 | 80 | 7th | R4 | R2 | EFL Trophy | GR | Ryan Hardie | 19 | 13,130 | — |
| 2022–23 | Lge 1 ↑ | 46 | 31 | 8 | 7 | 82 | 47 | 101 | 1st* | R1 | R1 | EFL Trophy | RU | Ryan Hardie | 17 | 15,492 | — |
| 2023–24 | Champ | 46 | 13 | 12 | 21 | 59 | 70 | 51 | 21st | R4 | R2 | — | — | Morgan Whittaker | 17 | 16,507 | — |
| 2024–25 | Champ ↓ | 46 | 11 | 13 | 22 | 51 | 88 | 46 | 23rd | R5 | R2 | — | — | Ryan Hardie | 12 | 16,537 | — |
