= Plymouth Argyle F.C. league record by opponent =

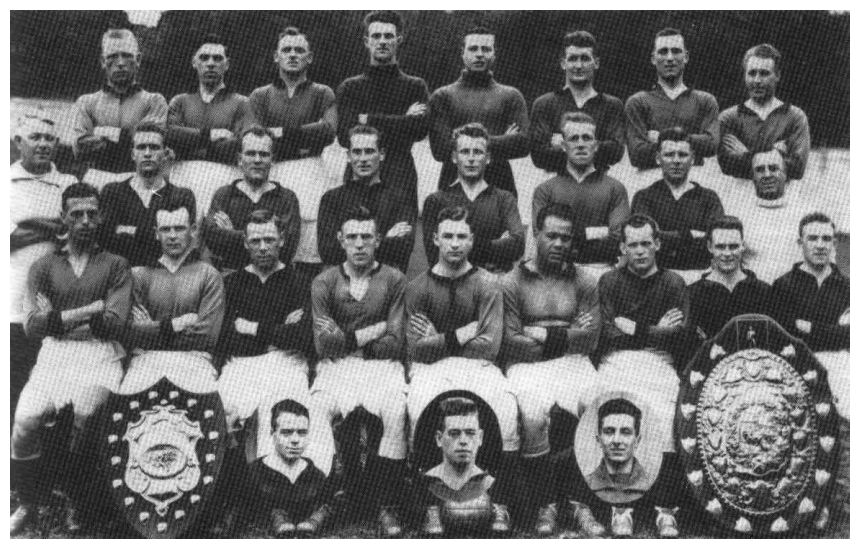
The Plymouth Argyle squad for the 1929–30 season, winners of the Football League Third Division South.

Plymouth Argyle Football Club are an English professional association football club based in Plymouth, Devon. They compete in EFL League One as of the 2025–26 season, the third division of the English football league system. The club was formed in 1886 as Argyle Football Club, a name which was retained until 1903 when the club became professional and were elected to the Southern Football League. The club joined the English Football League in 1920 and have competed there since then, achieving multiple league titles, promotions and relegations.

During this time, Plymouth Argyle's first team has competed in a number of nationally contested league competitions. Its record against each club faced in these competitions is listed below, in alphabetical order. The team that Plymouth Argyle have met most in league matches is Bristol Rovers, having played 132 matches since 1903. Bristol Rovers also account for the club's record number of victories, 58, and their highest number of draws, 36. Brighton & Hove Albion are the club against which Plymouth Argyle have lost the most, 39 times.

== Table key ==
- The table below includes results of matches played by Plymouth Argyle in the Southern League (from 1903 to 1920), the Western League (from 1903 to 1909) and the Football League (since 1920). Matches from the abandoned 1939–40 season are excluded, as are those played during the various wartime competitions.
- The name used for each opponent is that which they had when Plymouth Argyle most recently played a league match against them. Results against each opponent include results against that club under any former name.
- The columns headed "First" and "Last" contain the first and most recent seasons in which Plymouth Argyle played league matches against each opponent.
- † Clubs with this background and symbol in the "Opponent" column are Plymouth Argyle's divisional rivals in the current season.
- ‡ Clubs with this background and symbol in the "Opponent" column are defunct.

== League record ==
Results current as of 3 May 2025 (Note: Results in all competitions until May 2009 are sourced to Danes, Plymouth Argyle: A Complete Record. Results in all competitions post May 2009 are sourced to BBC Sport, Greens on Screen, and Statto.)

Plymouth Argyle F.C. league record by opponent
Opponent	Pld	W	D	L	Pld	W	D	L	Pld	W	D	L	Win%	First	Last	Notes
Opponent	Home				Away				Total				Win%	First	Last	Notes
Aberdare Athletic ‡	6	6	0	0	6	2	2	2	12	8	2	2	66.67	1921–22	1926–27	(Note: Aberdare Athletic were liquidated in 1928.)
Accrington Stanley (1891) ‡	1	0	0	1	1	0	1	0	2	0	1	1	0.00	1958–59	1958–59	(Note: Accrington Stanley were liquidated in 1966. A new club of the same name was formed in 1968.)
Accrington Stanley	10	4	4	2	10	5	2	3	20	9	6	5	45.00	2011–12	2022–23	
AFC Bournemouth	32	21	7	4	32	12	11	9	64	33	18	13	51.56	1923–24	2010–11	(Note: Bournemouth were known as Bournemouth & Boscombe Athletic, changing their name to its present form in 1972.)
AFC Wimbledon †	9	4	1	4	9	4	4	1	18	8	5	5	44.44	2011–12	2021–22	
Aldershot ‡	6	5	1	0	6	2	2	2	12	7	3	2	58.33	1950–51	1974–75	(Note: Aldershot were liquidated in 1992. A new club, Aldershot Town, was formed later that year.)
Aldershot Town	2	1	0	1	2	1	1	0	4	2	1	1	50.00	2011–12	2012–13	
Arsenal	1	0	0	1	1	0	0	1	2	0	0	2	0.00	1945–46	1945–46	
Aston Villa	8	3	2	3	8	1	1	6	16	4	3	9	25.00	1936–37	1987–88	
Barnet	9	5	2	2	9	2	3	4	18	7	5	6	38.89	1993–94	2016–17	
Barnsley †	32	18	8	6	32	10	10	12	64	28	18	18	43.75	1930–31	2022–23	
Barrow	2	2	0	0	2	0	1	1	4	2	1	1	50.00	1968–69	1969–70	
Birmingham City	16	3	5	8	16	3	4	9	32	6	9	17	18.75	1945–46	2023–24	
Blackburn Rovers	27	17	6	4	27	5	6	16	54	22	12	20	40.74	1936–37	2024–25	
Blackpool †	26	10	3	13	26	5	13	8	52	15	16	21	28.85	1933–34	2020–21	
Bolton Wanderers †	16	11	1	4	16	4	2	10	32	15	3	14	46.88	1933–34	2022–23	
Bradford City †	27	14	7	6	27	9	9	9	54	23	16	15	42.59	1930–31	2019–20	
Bradford Park Avenue	14	9	4	1	14	0	6	8	28	9	10	9	32.14	1907–08	1949–50	(Note: Bradford Park Avenue were liquidated in 1974. A new club of the same name was formed in 1988.)
Brentford	54	34	14	6	54	9	20	25	108	43	34	31	39.81	1903–04	2010–11	
Brighton & Hove Albion	52	25	17	10	52	11	12	29	104	36	29	39	34.62	1903–04	2010–11	
Bristol City	30	18	5	7	30	3	7	20	60	21	12	27	35.00	1922–23	2024–25	
Bristol Rovers	66	37	18	11	66	21	18	27	132	58	36	38	43.94	1903–04	2022–23	
Burnley	26	10	8	8	26	4	8	14	52	14	16	22	26.92	1930–31	2024–25	
Burton Albion †	8	4	1	3	8	0	5	3	16	4	6	6	25.00	2011–12	2022–23	
Bury	36	20	8	8	36	6	9	21	72	26	17	29	36.11	1930–31	2017–18	
Cambridge United	14	6	4	4	14	2	5	7	28	8	9	11	28.57	1973–74	2022–23	
Cardiff City †	33	14	15	4	33	10	6	17	66	24	21	21	36.36	1913–14	2024–25	
Carlisle United	20	15	2	3	20	4	6	10	40	19	8	13	47.50	1965–66	2019–20	
Charlton Athletic	38	22	8	8	38	6	7	25	76	28	15	33	36.84	1921–22	2022–23	
Chelsea	5	1	0	4	5	0	3	2	10	1	3	6	10.00	1945–46	1988–89	
Cheltenham Town	12	8	2	2	12	7	1	4	24	15	3	6	62.50	1999–20	2022–23	
Chester City ‡	10	7	3	0	10	3	2	5	20	10	5	5	50.00	1977–78	1999–20	
Chesterfield	29	14	10	5	29	9	7	13	58	23	17	18	39.66	1931–32	2013–14	
Colchester United	19	11	8	0	19	3	5	11	38	14	13	11	36.84	1950–51	2019–20	
Coventry City	32	20	5	7	32	7	8	17	64	27	13	24	42.19	1908–09	2024–25	
Crawley Town	4	2	2	0	4	1	2	1	8	3	4	1	37.50	2011–12	2019–20	
Crewe Alexandra	11	5	4	2	11	5	1	5	22	10	5	7	45.45	1968–69	2021–22	
Croydon Common ‡	2	1	0	1	2	0	1	1	4	1	1	2	25.00	1909–10	1914–15	(Note: Croydon Common were liquidated in 1917. A new club, Croydon, was formed in 1953 and another, Croydon Athletic, followed in 1986.)
Crystal Palace	33	16	8	9	33	10	7	16	66	26	15	25	39.39	1906–07	2009–10	
Dagenham & Redbridge	6	3	2	1	6	3	2	1	12	6	4	2	50.00	2010–11	2015–16	
Darlington	6	2	2	2	6	3	0	3	12	5	2	5	41.67	1985–86	2001–02	
Derby County	23	8	5	10	23	4	4	15	46	12	9	25	26.09	1945–46	2024–25	
Doncaster Rovers †	22	9	6	7	22	5	8	9	44	14	14	16	31.82	1935–36	2021–22	
Everton	3	2	0	1	3	0	0	3	6	2	0	4	33.33	1930–31	1953–54	
Exeter City †	43	26	10	7	44	14	14	16	87	40	24	23	45.98	1908–09	2022–23	
Fleetwood Town	7	3	2	2	7	1	2	4	14	4	4	6	28.57	2012–13	2022–23	
Forest Green Rovers	1	1	0	0	2	2	0	0	3	3	0	0	100.00	2019–20	2022–23	
Fulham	33	17	11	5	33	6	9	18	66	23	20	23	34.85	1903–04	1997–98	
Gillingham	50	36	10	4	50	15	11	24	100	51	21	28	51.00	1903–04	2021–22	(Note: Gillingham were originally called New Brompton, changing their name to its present form in 1912.)
Grimsby Town	17	9	4	4	16	1	10	5	33	10	14	9	30.30	1920–21	2019–20	
Halifax Town ‡	11	6	5	0	11	4	1	6	22	10	6	6	45.45	1958–59	2001–02	(Note: Halifax Town were liquidated in 2008. A new club, FC Halifax Town, was formed later that year.)
Hartlepool United	14	7	5	2	14	3	4	7	28	10	9	9	35.71	1968–69	2016–17	
Hereford United ‡	6	3	1	2	6	3	2	1	12	6	3	3	50.00	1973–74	2011–12	
Huddersfield Town †	23	9	9	5	23	5	3	15	46	14	12	20	30.43	1952–53	2023–24	
Hull City	37	14	10	13	37	9	9	19	74	23	19	32	31.08	1933–34	2024–25	
Ipswich Town	26	11	7	8	26	2	9	15	52	13	16	23	25.00	1950–51	2023–24	
Kettering Town	1	1	0	0	1	0	0	1	2	1	0	1	50.00	1903–04	1903–04	
Kidderminster Harriers	2	2	0	0	2	0	1	1	4	2	1	1	50.00	2000–01	2001–02	
Leeds United	21	9	4	8	21	1	6	14	42	10	10	22	23.81	1931–32	2024–25	
Leicester City	21	11	7	3	21	1	5	15	42	12	12	18	28.57	1935–36	2023–24	
Leyton ‡	7	7	0	0	7	1	2	4	14	8	2	4	57.14	1906–07	1911–12	(Note: Leyton F.C. were liquidated in 1914. A new club of the same named was formed in 1997 but dissolved in 2011.)
Leyton Orient †	28	17	6	5	27	11	4	12	55	28	10	17	50.91	1929–30	2019–20	
Lincoln City †	23	9	5	9	23	4	9	10	46	13	14	19	28.26	1932–33	2022–23	
Liverpool	5	2	1	2	5	0	2	3	10	2	3	5	20.00	1954–55	1961–62	
Luton Town †	50	29	12	9	50	12	21	17	100	41	33	26	41.00	1903–04	2024–25	
Macclesfield Town ‡	5	4	0	1	5	0	3	2	10	4	3	3	40.00	1999–20	2019–20	
Manchester City	7	4	1	2	7	1	2	4	14	5	3	6	35.71	1938–39	1988–89	
Manchester United	6	3	1	2	6	1	1	4	12	4	2	6	33.33	1931–32	1937–38	
Mansfield Town †	19	15	3	1	19	8	6	5	38	23	9	6	60.53	1958–59	2019–20	
Merthyr Town ‡	14	10	3	1	12	6	3	3	26	16	6	4	61.54	1912–13	1929–30	(Note: Merthyr Town were liquidated in 1934.)
Middlesbrough	17	3	9	5	17	6	2	9	34	9	11	14	26.47	1954–55	2024–25	
Millwall	56	31	16	9	57	9	19	29	113	40	35	38	35.40	1903–04	2024–25	
Milton Keynes Dons	5	3	0	2	5	3	1	1	10	6	1	3	60.00	2010–11	2022–23	
Morecambe	9	7	2	0	8	3	2	3	17	10	4	3	58.82	2011–12	2022–23	
Newcastle United	15	5	3	7	15	1	3	11	30	6	6	18	20.00	1934–35	2009–10	
Newport County	31	23	3	5	31	10	6	15	62	33	9	20	53.23	1919–20	2019–20	
Northampton Town †	42	24	8	10	43	10	10	23	85	34	18	33	40.00	1903–04	2020–21	
Norwich City	45	32	8	5	45	12	10	23	90	44	18	28	48.89	1905–06	2024–25	
Nottingham Forest	23	15	2	6	23	4	4	15	46	19	6	21	41.30	1930–31	2009–10	
Notts County	21	6	7	8	21	6	1	14	42	12	8	22	28.57	1931–32	2016–17	
Oldham Athletic	23	11	8	4	22	6	5	11	45	17	13	15	37.78	1930–31	2019–20	
Oxford United	25	12	6	7	25	5	7	13	50	17	13	20	34.00	1975–76	2024–25	
Peterborough United †	15	8	1	6	15	4	2	9	30	12	3	15	40.00	1974–75	2022–23	
Port Vale †	28	18	4	6	29	4	5	20	57	22	9	26	38.60	1930–31	2022–23	
Portsmouth	52	28	12	12	52	13	14	25	104	41	26	37	39.42	1903–04	2024–25	
Preston North End	31	14	8	9	31	5	10	16	62	19	18	25	30.65	1930–31	2024–25	
Queens Park Rangers	43	23	10	10	43	9	11	23	86	32	21	33	37.21	1903–04	2024–25	
Reading †	44	24	11	9	44	15	12	17	88	39	23	26	44.32	1903–04	2009–10	
Rochdale	17	9	4	4	17	6	6	5	34	15	10	9	44.12	1958–59	2020–21	
Rotherham United †	37	20	9	8	37	10	8	19	74	30	17	27	40.54	1952–53	2023–24	
Rushden & Diamonds ‡	2	2	0	0	2	1	0	1	4	3	0	1	75.00	2001–02	2003–04	(Note: Rushden & Diamonds were liquidated in 2011. A new club, AFC Rushden & Diamonds, was formed later that year.)
Salford City	1	0	1	0	1	1	0	0	2	1	1	0	50.00	2019–20	2019–20	
Scarborough ‡	2	1	1	0	2	0	1	1	4	1	2	1	25.00	1995–96	1998–99	(Note: Scarborough F.C. were liquidated in 2007. A new club, Scarborough Athletic, was formed later that year.)
Scunthorpe United	17	12	1	4	17	3	3	11	34	15	4	15	44.12	1959–60	2019–20	
Sheffield United	23	12	6	5	23	3	4	16	46	15	10	21	32.61	1934–35	2024–25	
Sheffield Wednesday	22	9	5	8	23	8	6	9	45	17	11	17	37.78	1937–38	2024–25	(Note: Sheffield Wednesday were originally called The Wednesday, changing their name to its present form in 1929.)
Shrewsbury Town	27	13	12	2	27	7	6	14	54	20	18	16	37.04	1951–52	2022–23	
Southampton	53	27	14	12	53	15	14	24	106	42	28	36	39.62	1903–04	2023–24	
Southend United	42	21	15	6	42	7	10	25	84	28	25	31	33.33	1908–09	2018–19	
Southport	3	1	1	1	3	0	2	1	6	1	3	2	16.67	1968–69	1973–74	
Stevenage †	4	3	1	0	4	2	0	2	8	5	1	2	62.50	2014–15	2019–20	
Stockport County †	10	5	2	3	10	6	1	3	20	11	3	6	55.00	1937–38	2003–04	
Stoke City	23	11	6	6	23	1	7	15	46	12	13	21	26.09	1911–12	2024–25	
Sunderland	17	8	4	5	17	3	2	12	34	11	6	17	32.35	1959–60	2024–25	
Swansea City	46	23	11	12	46	12	8	26	92	35	19	38	38.04	1919–20	2024–25	
Swindon Town	50	31	12	7	50	13	10	27	100	44	22	34	44.00	1903–04	2020–21	
Torquay United	21	11	7	3	21	9	6	6	42	20	13	9	47.62	1927–28	2013–14	
Tottenham Hotspur	21	7	8	6	21	7	3	11	42	14	11	17	33.33	1903–04	1949–50	
Tranmere Rovers	16	9	2	5	16	2	3	11	32	11	5	16	34.38	1938–39	2014–15	
Walsall	31	23	5	3	30	10	8	12	61	33	13	15	54.10	1927–28	2019–20	
Watford	44	18	17	9	44	19	9	16	88	37	26	25	42.05	1904–05	2024–25	
Wellingborough ‡	2	2	0	0	2	2	0	0	4	4	0	0	100.00	1903–04	1904–05	(Note: Wellingborough F.C. were liquidated in 2002. A new club, Wellingborough Town, was formed in 2004.)
West Bromwich Albion	18	8	5	5	18	5	4	9	36	13	9	14	36.11	1930–31	2024–25	
West Ham United	36	19	10	7	37	5	11	21	73	24	21	28	32.88	1903–04	2004–05	
Wigan Athletic †	12	5	1	6	12	4	4	4	24	9	5	10	37.50	1982–83	2021–22	
Wimbledon ‡	3	2	0	1	3	0	0	3	6	2	0	4	33.33	1979–80	1983–84	(Note: Wimbledon were dissolved in 2004. New clubs, AFC Wimbledon and Milton Keynes Dons, were formed in 2002 and 2004, respectively.)
Wolverhampton Wanderers	15	6	6	3	15	2	5	8	30	8	11	11	26.67	1930–31	2008–09	
Wrexham	13	4	4	5	13	4	4	5	26	8	8	10	30.77	1958–59	2003–04	
Wycombe Wanderers †	14	4	4	6	14	5	3	6	28	9	7	12	32.14	1994–95	2022–23	
Yeovil Town	3	2	1	0	3	0	1	2	6	2	2	2	33.33	2010–11	2016–17	(Note: Yeovil Town were originally known as Yeovil & Petters United, changing their name to its present form in 1946.)
York City	17	8	6	3	17	4	8	5	34	12	14	8	35.29	1971–72	2015–16	
