= 1903–04 Plymouth Argyle F.C. season =

English football club season

Plymouth Argyle
1903–04 season
- Chairman: B. Spooner
- Manager: Frank Brettell
- Ground: Home Park
- Southern League First Division: 9th (out of 18 clubs)
- Western League First Division: 3rd (out of 9 clubs)
- FA Cup: First round proper
- Top goalscorer: League: Jack Picken (10); All: Jack Peddie (21)
- Highest home attendance: 20,103 vs The Wednesday (6 February 1904)
- Lowest home attendance: 1,500 vs New Brompton (16 March 1904)
- Average home league attendance: League: 5,835; All: 6,030
Team colours

The 1903–04 season was the first season of competitive association football in the history of Plymouth Argyle Football Club, an English football club based in Plymouth, Devon.

== Competitions ==
=== Southern League First Division ===
==== Table ====
| Pos | Team | Pld | W | D | L | GF | GA | GR | Pts |
|---|---|---|---|---|---|---|---|---|---|
| 7 | Millwall | 34 | 16 | 8 | 10 | 64 | 42 | 1.524 | 40 |
| 8 | Luton Town | 34 | 14 | 12 | 8 | 38 | 33 | 1.152 | 40 |
| 9 | Plymouth Argyle | 34 | 13 | 10 | 11 | 44 | 34 | 1.294 | 36 |
| 10 | Swindon Town | 34 | 10 | 11 | 13 | 30 | 42 | 0.714 | 31 |
| 11 | Fulham | 34 | 9 | 12 | 13 | 34 | 36 | 0.944 | 30 |

Source: rsssf.com
Rules for classification: The system of using goal average to separate two teams tied on points was used until the 1976-77 season. The points system: 2 points for a win, 1 point for a draw and 0 points for losing.

==== Results ====
| Date | Opponents | Venue | Result | Score F–A | Scorers | Attendance |
|---|---|---|---|---|---|---|
| 5 September 1903 | Northampton Town | H | W | 2–0 | Peddie, Picken | 6,200 |
| 12 September 1903 | Brentford | A | L | 0–1 | | 9,000 |
| 19 September 1903 | West Ham United | H | W | 2–0 | Winterhalder, Peddie | 4,000 |
| 26 September 1903 | Tottenham Hotspur | A | W | 2–0 | Anderson, Leech | 17,000 |
| 3 October 1903 | Luton Town | H | D | 0–0 | | 8,500 |
| 10 October 1903 | New Brompton | A | D | 0–0 | | 5,000 |
| 17 October 1903 | Kettering Town | H | W | 5–1 | Dalrymple, Picken 2, Peddie 2 | 5,000 |
| 24 October 1903 | Southampton | A | W | 5–3 | Jack 2, Dalrymple, Anderson, Picken | 12,000 |
| 7 November 1903 | Millwall | A | L | 0–1 | | 9,000 |
| 11 November 1903 | Fulham | H | W | 1–0 | Picken | 14,000 |
| 21 November 1903 | Swindon Town | A | L | 0–2 | | 5,000 |
| 5 December 1903 | Wellingborough | H | W | 4–1 | Anderson 3, Jack | 3,000 |
| 19 December 1903 | Brighton & Hove Albion | H | W | 4–2 | Peddie, Winterhalder, Dalrymple, Anderson | 3,000 |
| 25 December 1903 | Reading | H | L | 0–1 | | 10,000 |
| 26 December 1903 | Bristol Rovers | A | W | 2–1 | Dalrymple, Anderson | 12,000 |
| 28 December 1903 | Portsmouth | A | D | 0–0 | | 12,000 |
| 2 January 1904 | Northampton Town | A | L | 0–1 | | 3,000 |
| 9 January 1904 | Brentford | H | D | 2–2 | Anderson, Dalrymple | 4,000 |
| 16 January 1904 | West Ham United | A | D | 1–1 | Peddie | 6,000 |
| 23 January 1904 | Tottenham Hotspur | H | L | 1–3 | Anderson | 8,000 |
| 30 January 1904 | Luton Town | A | D | 1–1 | Jack | 3,000 |
| 13 February 1904 | Kettering Town | A | L | 0–3 | | 1,000 |
| 20 February 1904 | Brighton & Hove Albion | A | D | 0–0 | | 3,000 |
| 27 February 1904 | Fulham | A | L | 0–1 | | 13,000 |
| 5 March 1904 | Millwall | H | L | 2–3 | Dalrymple, Wheaton | 2,000 |
| 9 March 1904 | Southampton | H | L | 0–2 | | 3,000 |
| 12 March 1904 | Queens Park Rangers | A | L | 0–1 | | 8,000 |
| 16 March 1904 | New Brompton | H | W | 1–0 | Banks | 1,500 |
| 19 March 1904 | Swindon Town | H | D | 0–0 | | 4,500 |
| 1 April 1904 | Bristol Rovers | H | D | 0–0 | | 12,000 |
| 2 April 1904 | Wellingborough | A | W | 3–1 | Picken 2, Peddie | 3,000 |
| 4 April 1904 | Reading | A | W | 3–1 | Picken 2, Peddie | 10,000 |
| 13 April 1904 | Queens Park Rangers | H | D | 1–1 | Picken | 3,000 |
| 23 April 1904 | Portsmouth | H | W | 2–0 | Buck, Peddie | 7,500 |

=== Western League First Division ===
==== Table ====
| Pos | Team | Pld | W | D | L | GF | GA | GR | Pts |
|---|---|---|---|---|---|---|---|---|---|
| 1 | Tottenham Hotspur | 16 | 11 | 3 | 2 | 32 | 12 | 2.667 | 25 |
| 2 | Southampton | 16 | 9 | 3 | 4 | 30 | 18 | 1.667 | 21 |
| 3 | Plymouth Argyle | 16 | 8 | 4 | 4 | 23 | 19 | 1.211 | 20 |
| 4 | Portsmouth | 16 | 7 | 2 | 7 | 24 | 22 | 1.091 | 16 |
| 5 | Brentford | 16 | 6 | 4 | 6 | 19 | 23 | 0.826 | 16 |
| 6 | Queens Park Rangers | 16 | 5 | 5 | 6 | 15 | 21 | 0.714 | 15 |
| 7 | Reading | 16 | 4 | 4 | 8 | 16 | 26 | 0.615 | 12 |
| 8 | Bristol Rovers | 16 | 4 | 3 | 9 | 29 | 29 | 1.000 | 11 |
| 9 | West Ham United | 16 | 2 | 4 | 10 | 13 | 31 | 0.419 | 8 |

==== Results ====
| Date | Opponents | Venue | Result | Score F–A | Scorers | Attendance |
|---|---|---|---|---|---|---|
| 1 September 1903 | West Ham United | A | W | 1–0 | Peddie | — |
| 9 September 1903 | Portsmouth | A | W | 2–1 | Leech, Anderson | — |
| 14 September 1903 | Queens Park Rangers | A | D | 1–1 | Picken | — |
| 30 September 1903 | Portsmouth | H | W | 3–1 | Peddie, Anderson, Dalrymple | — |
| 12 October 1903 | Bristol Rovers | A | L | 0–3 | | — |
| 18 November 1903 | Southampton | H | W | 2–0 | Peddie 2 | — |
| 4 January 1904 | Southampton | A | W | 2–1 | Banks, Dalrymple | — |
| 14 February 1904 | Queens Park Rangers | H | L | 0–1 | | — |
| 29 February 1904 | Tottenham Hotspur | A | L | 1–5 | Fitchett | — |
| 23 March 1904 | Brentford | H | D | 0–0 | | — |
| 26 March 1904 | Reading | A | L | 1–2 | Dalrymple | — |
| 5 April 1904 | Brentford | A | W | 1–0 | Dalrymple | — |
| 9 April 1904 | Bristol Rovers | H | D | 2–2 | Picken 2 | — |
| 20 April 1904 | Tottenham Hotspur | H | D | 0–0 | | — |
| 27 April 1904 | West Ham United | H | W | 3–2 | Buck, Dalrymple, Picken | — |
| 30 April 1904 | Reading | H | W | 4–0 | Peddie 2, Picken, Dalrymple | — |

=== FA Cup ===
| Round | Date | Opponents | Venue | Result | Score F–A | Scorers | Attendance |
|---|---|---|---|---|---|---|---|
| Q1 | 31 October 1903 | Whiteheads | H | W | 7–0 | Dalrymple 2, Peddie 2, Winterhalder 2, Anderson | 1,870 |
| Q2 | 14 November 1903 | Freemantle | H | W | 5–1 | Peddie 2, Winterhalder, Picken 2 | 2,500 |
| Q3 | 28 November 1903 | Swindon Town | H | W | 2–0 | Dalrymple, Peddie | 5,000 |
| Int | 12 December 1903 | Brentford | A | D | 1–1 | Clark | 8,000 |
| Rep | 16 December 1903 | Brentford | H | W | 4–1 | Dalrymple, Anderson, Winterhalder 2 | 4,000 |
| R1 | 6 February 1904 | The Wednesday | H | D | 2–2 | Dalrymple, Peddie | 20,103 |
| Rep | 10 February 1904 | The Wednesday | A | L | 0–2 | | 18,845 |

== See also ==
- List of Plymouth Argyle F.C. seasons
