= Robert Jack =

Robert Jack may refer to:

- Rollo Jack (Robert Rollo Jack, 1902–1994), footballer
- Robert Jack (physicist) (1877–1957), Scottish-born physicist in New Zealand
- Robert Logan Jack (1845–1921), Queensland government geologist
- Bob Jack (1876–1943), Scottish footballer and manager
- Robert Jack, actor who played Czar Nicholas II in the 2019 docudrama series The Last Czars

== See also ==
- Robert Jacks (1943—2014), Australian painter, sculptor and printmaker
- Robert L. Jacks (1927-1987), American film producer
- Robert Jacks, actor who played Leatherface in the cast of Texas Chainsaw Massacre: The Next Generation
