= Durrell Berry =

English footballer

- Berry as a Plymouth Argyle player

Personal information
- Full name: Durrell Joel Berry
- Date of birth: 27 May 1992 (age 34)
- Place of birth: Derby, England
- Height: 5 ft 11 in (1.80 m)
- Position: Full back

Team information
- Current team: Mickleover Sports

Youth career
- –2006: Notts County
- 2006–2010: Aston Villa

Senior career*
Years	Team	Apps	(Gls)
2010–2011	Aston Villa	0	(0)
2011–2014	Plymouth Argyle	95	(1)
2014–2015	Torquay United	12	(0)
2015	Cheltenham Town	12	(2)
2015–2016	Alfreton Town	0	(0)
2015–2016	→ Torquay United (loan)	26	(1)
2016–2017	Truro City	2	(0)
2017–2018	Kettering Town	16	(0)
2019–	Mickleover Sports		
- * Club domestic league appearances and goals as of 7 April 2019

Durrell Joel Berry (born 27 May 1992) is an English footballer who last played for Mickleover Sports in 2019.

He began his career with Notts County's centre of excellence and progressed through Aston Villa's academy to sign his first professional contract in 2010. Having joined Plymouth Argyle the following year, Berry made his debut in the Football League in August 2011. On 20 July 2017 Berry signed for Kettering Town, following his departure from Truro City.

== Early life ==
Berry was born in Derby. He was a student at Saint Benedict Catholic School and made the news in July 2007 after being sent home for having a short haircut, which was against school policy. "They sent me home because they said my hair's too short and it represents a hooligan look," said Berry, who had his head shaved with grade one blades every few weeks. "I just feel like it's my human right really to have my hair at a grade one if I want to." The rule, introduced in 1986 to prevent white pupils from getting involved in skinhead culture, was changed two months later to allow students to have grade two haircuts.

== Playing career ==
He began his career in Notts County's centre of excellence. Berry left in 2006 when the club cancelled their youth programmes as a cost-cutting measure. He had trials with Derby County, Nottingham Forest and Aston Villa before joining the latter's academy. Berry played in several positions for the club's youth team. He began the 2009–10 season as a forward, but went on to play regularly as a right-sided full-back. Berry played in both legs of the 2010 FA Youth Cup Final, which Aston Villa lost 3–2 on aggregate to Chelsea. He signed his first professional contract later in the year and began playing for the club's reserves. Berry played for the team regularly during the 2010–11 campaign, including winning the Hong Kong International Soccer Sevens, but was among a list of ten players who were released at the end of the season.

Berry joined Plymouth Argyle on a one-year contract in July 2011. He began his first season with the club as first-choice right-back, playing in their first 15 games, before losing his place in the team to Paul Bignot. He regained his starting position in December and played regularly for the rest of the campaign, making 35 appearances in the league and one in the FA Cup. Berry was offered a contract extension by the club in May 2012, and signed it two weeks later for an undisclosed period of time. Injuries limited his availability in 2012–13, but he did play in 32 games, including a Football League Trophy tie with Oxford United where he was sent off for two bookable offences. Berry only managed 25 appearances in the following season due to the emergence of Ben Purrington and the arrival of Matt Parsons from Crystal Palace. He left the club on 10 June 2014 along with Andres Gurrieri who also turned down a contract offer.

Berry joined up with Torquay United in November 2014., where after seasons plagued with injury along with a spell at Cheltenham Town he went on to play for Truro City and now Kettering Town.

On 29 December 2018, Berry joined Mickleover Sports.

On 14 April 2024, Berry lifted the Derbyshire Senior Sunday Cup with the Golden Pheasant.

Not to end his career there, Berry signed for Borrowash Victoria AFC in early 2025, initially playing centre half but going on to dominate in midfield.

== Career statistics ==
As of match played on 3 May 2015.

Appearances and goals by club, season and competition
Club	Season	League			FA Cup		League Cup		Other		Total	
Club	Season	Division	Apps	Goals	Apps	Goals	Apps	Goals	Apps	Goals	Apps	Goals
Aston Villa	2010–11	Premier League	0	0	0	0	0	0	0	0	0	0
Plymouth Argyle	2011–12	League Two	35	0	1	0	0	0	0	0	36	0
Plymouth Argyle	2012–13	League Two	28	0	1	0	1	0	2 (Note: Appearances in the Football League Trophy)	0	32	0
Plymouth Argyle	2013–14	League Two	25	1	5	0	1	0	1	0	32	1
Plymouth Argyle	Total		88	1	7	0	2	0	3	0	100	1
Cheltenham Town	2014–15	League Two	12	2	0	0	0	0	0	0	12	2
Career total			100	3	7	0	2	0	3	0	112	3
