= Robert Dalrymple =

Scottish footballer (1880–1970)

Personal information
- Full name: Robert Rodie Dalrymple
- Date of birth: 2 January 1880
- Place of birth: Paisley, Scotland
- Date of death: 26 July 1970 (aged 90)
- Place of death: Worthing, England
- Height: 5 ft 7 in (1.70 m)
- Position: Inside forward

Senior career*
Years	Team	Apps	(Gls)
1899–1900	Westmarch		
1900–1902	Abercorn	31	(11)
1902–1903	Heart of Midlothian	6	(2)
1902	→ Kilbarchan (loan)		
1903–1905	Plymouth Argyle	56	(16)
1905–1906	Rangers	12	(4)
1906–1907	Portsmouth		
1907–1910	Fulham	98	(40)
1910–1920	Clapton Orient	139	(38)
- Ton Pentre
Total		337	(108)
- * Club domestic league appearances and goals

Robert Rodie Dalrymple (2 January 1880 – 26 July 1970) was a Scottish footballer who played as an inside forward.

== Early life ==
Dalrymple was born in Paisley.

== Playing career ==
He began his career with Westmarch before joining local Scottish Football League Second Division club Abercorn. In 1902, he moved to Edinburgh to play for First Division side Heart of Midlothian. Having spent time with Kilbarchan on loan, Dalrymple scored on his debut for Hearts in a 1–1 draw with Edinburgh rivals Hibernian on 11 October 1902. He went on to score two more goals that season, in a league game against Morton and a Scottish Cup tie at Ayr. Having helped the club reach the 1903 Scottish Cup Final, he played in a 1–1 draw against Rangers at Celtic Park on 11 April 1903 and the replay one week later, which also ended in a draw. Dalrymple received a runners-up medal after Hearts lost the second replay by two goals to nil on 25 April 1903, with 32,000 spectators in attendance. He moved to England in the summer of 1903, joining Plymouth Argyle ahead of the club's first season in professional football. He made his debut in a 1–0 win at West Ham United on 1 September 1903, and scored his first goal at the end of the month as the club defeated Portsmouth 3–1.

A versatile player, Dalrymple scored the club's first goal in the FA Cup and scored a second later in the game as Argyle defeated Whiteheads by seven goals to nil in the first qualifying round. He finished the season with 17 goals scored in all competitions, having made 43 appearances. The following season, he was among the goals in the FA Cup again, earning Argyle a 1–1 draw at Newcastle United in the first round on 4 February 1905. He scored a further 12 goals in league competition, including a brace in a 4–1 win against Southampton, and won his first major title at the end of the season as the club were crowned Western Football League champions. He moved back to Scotland in the summer of 1905, having scored 30 goals in 92 appearances for Plymouth Argyle, to sign for Rangers. He made his debut on 19 August 1905 as they defeated Kilmarnock by three goals to two at Ibrox Stadium. He scored his first goal in the return match at Kilmarnock on 6 January 1906, which Rangers won 3–1, and scored a hat-trick two weeks later in a 4–0 home win against Port Glasgow Athletic.

In the Scottish Cup, Dalrymple scored a brace in victories against Arthurlie and Aberdeen. He made 18 appearances in his one season with the club, scoring 8 goals. Dalrymple returned to England in 1906, where he spent a season back in the Southern Football League with Portsmouth. The following year, he joined Fulham ahead of their first season in The Football League. He scored 44 goals in 106 appearances over the next three years, and helped the club reach the semi-finals of the FA Cup in 1908, where they were beaten 6–0 by Newcastle United at Anfield. In 1910, he moved to Clapton Orient and spent the next 9 years there, scoring 38 goals in 139 league games. He finished his career back in the Southern League with Welsh side Ton Pentre.

== Personal life ==
Dalrymple served as a sergeant in the Football Battalion of the Middlesex Regiment during the First World War. He died on 26 July 1970.

== Honours ==
Plymouth Argyle

- Western League: 1904–05

== Career statistics ==
Club	Season	Division	League		National Cup		Other		Total	
Club	Season	Division	Apps	Goals	Apps	Goals	Apps	Goals	Apps	Goals
Abercorn	1900–01	Scottish League Second Division	11	3	7	0	—		18	3
Abercorn	1901–02	Scottish League Second Division	20	8	1	0	—		21	8
Abercorn	Total		31	11	8	0	—		39	11
Heart of Midlothian	1902–03	Scottish League First Division	6	2	8	1	—		14	3
Plymouth Argyle	1903–04	Southern League First Division	26	6	6	5	11 (Note: Appearances in Western League.)	6	43	17
Plymouth Argyle	1904–05	Southern League First Division	30	4	4	1	15	8	49	13
Plymouth Argyle	Total		56	10	10	6	26	14	92	30
Rangers	1905–06	Scottish League First Division	13	4	2	4	3 (Note: Appearances in Glasgow Cup.)	0	18	8
Fulham	1907–08	Second Division	33	19	6	3	—		39	22
Fulham	1908–09	Second Division	31	12	2	0	—		33	12
Fulham	1909–10	Second Division	29	7	2	1	—		31	8
Fulham	1910–11	Second Division	5	2	0	0	—		5	2
Fulham	Total		98	40	8	4	—		106	44
Total			204	67	36	15	29	14	269	96
