= William Fullarton (footballer) =

Scottish footballer and manager

Personal information
- Date of birth: 1882
- Place of birth: Ardrossan, Scotland
- Position: Centre-half

Senior career*
Years	Team	Apps	(Gls)
- Vale of Leven
- Queen's Park
1903–1905	Sunderland	31	(1)
1905–1906	Nottingham Forest	20	(0)

Managerial career
- 1906–1907: Plymouth Argyle
- * Club domestic league appearances and goals

William M. Fullarton (1882–?) was a Scottish association football player active prior to the First World War who played primarily as a centre-half and made over fifty appearances in The Football League. He also spent one season as manager of Plymouth Argyle.

== Playing career ==
Born in Ardrossan, Fullarton began his career in Scotland, playing for Vale of Leven and Queen's Park. In 1903 he moved south to join Sunderland of the Football League First Division. Over the next two seasons he made 31 League appearances for the club, scoring a single goal. In 1905 he moved to another First Division club, Nottingham Forest, for a fee of £500, making a further twenty League starts.

== Management career ==
In 1906, he joined Plymouth Argyle as manager. Although Argyle wanted to sign him as a player, Forest refused to release his registration. According to the Plymouth Argyle 1906–1907 handbook:

"The loss of Bob Jack was to many the loss not only of an attractive player at his best, but also of a personal friend. His successor is W.H. Fullarton, late of Notts Forest. For his transfer £500 was paid to Sunderland by the Foresters, and the Midland Club's directorate was not at all pleased to learn that Fullarton was coming West. For a centre half he is the man who would be most acceptable to Notts Forest just now. That fact probably inspires the policy which is being pursued by Notts in refusing their consent for Fullarton to play for Plymouth. While he is at liberty to manage the side there is an objection to his lending it actual assistance on the field. At the time of writing, however, there were hopes that the difficulty might be removed. In any case, if Fullarton proves a first-class manager, as it is believed he will, the club will be extremely fortunate in having retained him."

He led the team for one season, guiding them to a disappointing 15th-place finish in the Southern Football League. Fullarton was also responsible for signing a number of players, including Herbert Swann.

At the end of the 1906–07 season, the board of the club decided not only to dispense with Fullerton, but to do without a manager altogether. The team was run by a management committee for three seasons before Bob Jack began his long and illustrious second spell with the Pilgrims. Nothing is known about Fullerton's life or career after he left Home Park.

== Family ==
His brother David played for Plymouth in the Southern League and then moved on to New Brompton.
