= Saint Benedict Catholic Voluntary Academy =

Secondary school in Derby, England

Location
- Duffield Road; Derby, Derbyshire, DE22 1JD; England; 52°56′36″N 1°29′09″W

Information
- Type: Secondary academy & Sixth Form
- Religious affiliation: Roman Catholic
- Established: 1986
- Department for Education URN: 138622 Tables
- Ofsted: Reports
- Headteacher: Hazel Boyce
- Gender: Coeducational
- Age: 11 to 18
- Enrolment: 1700
- Colours: Blue, yellow
- Website: www.saintben.derby.sch.uk

Saint Benedict Catholic Voluntary Academy is a Catholic secondary school with academy status in the Darley Abbey district of Derby.

It has around 1500 students, with more than 100 teachers, as well as a non-teaching support staff such as Learning Support Assistants and House Administrators.

== School history ==
The school was built on its current site in, after the land had been acquired by the Sisters of Mercy, and St. Philomena's High School for Senior Girls moved from Broadway, where it had been located since 1947. In 1971, St. Philomena's merged with the local St. Mary's Secondary School. The two Catholic secondary schools in Derby - Saint Thomas More and Saint Ralph Sherwin - merged in 1986. The school was named after St. Benedict, and had a logo with a Latin motto, 'Crux Sancti Patris Benedicti' ('the cross of our holy father Benedict'), until the school logo was changed in 2002, to show a more angelic version of St. Benedict.

== Buildings ==
The school is split into two bases, North Block and South Block as of 2023 North Block was changed to K Block. K Block and South Block are around five minutes' walk apart. The blocks used to be separate schools. Each houses a variety of resources such as the Sports Hall and Theatre. The larger collection of buildings is at 'South Block', where a library, music suite, sports hall, languages centre and design and technology block have been added since the early 1990s.

=== Enhanced Resource Base (ERB) ===
This is a unit for supporting students with difficulties such as visual impairment, physical impairment and other learning difficulties. There are adapted computer study/teaching rooms, as well as additional rooms for staff and students to use. The ERB also has input from external specialists in careers and physio advice. The ERB has its own on-site IT Technician and Resource Technician.

=== North Block ===
North Block houses a variety of subjects like Religious Studies, Food Technology, science, Sociology and Humanities, as well as North Block reception which doubles up as the box office for The Robert Ludlam Theatre. The school chapel and the chapel garden are also here Though it is poorly maintained.

=== Robert Ludlam Theatre ===
The Robert Ludlam Theatre is a 270-seat venue with a diverse programme of entertainment including dance, drama, art, music, theatre in the round, comedy, films, family Entertainment, rock and pop events, and workshops. It provides a home for many of Derbyshire's amateur production groups.

=== South Block ===
The majority of lessons are taught in the earliest South Block building. It has floors for maths, English, and a section for Art and Design.

=== Vocational Centre ===
The Vocational Centre is the main room used for teaching business studies.

=== Music Block ===
The department provides lessons for drum kit, brass, woodwind, cello, keyboard, violin, classical guitar, electric guitar, bass guitar and voice. Pupils have taken Associated Board Exams, Trinity Exams and Rock School Exams.

== Notable former pupils ==
- Tracy Shaw (b. 1973) - actress (Coronation Street)
- Chris Riggott (b. 1980) - footballer for Derby County and Middlesbrough
- Keiran Lee (b. 1984) - pornographic actor
- Luke Gunn (b. 1985) - athlete
- Michael Socha (b. 1987) - actor
- Jack O'Connell (b. 1990) - actor (This Is England)
- Lauren Socha (b. 1990) - actor
- Durrell Berry (b. 1992) - footballer
- Sarah Vasey (b. 1996) - British swimmer
