= Ernie Edds =

English footballer

Personal information
- Full name: Ernest Frederick Edds
- Date of birth: 19 March 1926
- Place of birth: Portsmouth, England
- Date of death: 7 June 2017 (aged 91)
- Position: Forward

Youth career
- Portsmouth

Senior career*
Years	Team	Apps	(Gls)
1945–1946	Millwall	0	(0)
1946–1949	Plymouth Argyle	59	(18)
1949–1951	Blackburn Rovers	18	(3)
1951–1953	Torquay United	84	(34)
1953–1955	Plymouth Argyle	26	(4)
1955	Swindon Town	3	(0)
- * Club domestic league appearances and goals

Ernest Frederick Edds (19 March 1926 – 7 June 2017) was an English footballer who played as a forward. He made 190 appearances in the Football League for Plymouth Argyle, Blackburn Rovers, Torquay United and Swindon Town.

== Life and career ==
Edds began his career as an amateur with Portsmouth and later signed a professional contract with Millwall. He served in the British Army during the Second World War, which brought him to Plymouth. Edds was seen playing for an Army team in the Plymouth and District League by Plymouth Argyle and the club agreed a fee with Millwall for his transfer. Having made one appearance in his first season, Edds competed with Maurice Tadman for the centre forward position in the 1947–48 campaign and was the club's top scorer with 14 goals in 23 matches. A move to the inside left and outside left positions saw his form suffer and he lost his place in the side at the start of the 1949–50 campaign.

He was transferred to Blackburn Rovers later in the season, where he spent 18 months and scored three goals in 18 league appearances. A lack of first team opportunities at Blackburn saw Edds return to Devon in 1951 to join Torquay United. He scored 34 times in 84 league games over the next two years. He was brought back to Plymouth Argyle early in the 1953–54 season in exchange for Harold Dobbie as the club sought a replacement for Alex Govan. Edds played regularly on his return, but when he lost his place in the team the following season, was allowed to join Swindon Town, having scored 22 goals in 88 league and cup appearances for Argyle. Edds made three appearances for Swindon in August 1955 before he was forced to retire due to injury.

Edds died on 7 June 2017.
