= 1906–07 Plymouth Argyle F.C. season =

English football club season

Plymouth Argyle
1906–07 season
- President: Clarence Spooner
- Manager: William Fullerton
- Southern League: 15th
- Western League: 2nd
- FA Cup: First Round
Home colours

The 1906–07 season was the fourth competitive season in the history of Plymouth Argyle Football Club. They competed in the Southern League and the Western League along with the FA Cup.

== Squad ==
- William Brown (footballer, born 1876)

== Competitions ==
=== Southern League ===
==== Table ====
Pos	Team	Pld	W	D	L	GF	GA	GR	Pts
13	Leyton	38	11	12	15	38	60	0.633	34
14	Bristol Rovers	38	12	9	17	55	54	1.019	33
15	Plymouth Argyle	38	10	13	15	43	50	0.860	33
16	New Brompton	38	12	9	17	47	59	0.797	33
17	Swindon Town	38	11	11	16	43	54	0.796	33

Rules for classification: The system of using goal average to separate two teams tied on points was used until the 1976-77 season. The points system: 2 points for a win, 1 point for a draw and 0 points for losing.

==== Results ====
8 September 1906	Plymouth Argyle	2–1	New Brompton	Plymouth, Devon
			Cunliffe	Stadium: Home Park

12 December 1906	Tottenham Hotspur	4–2	Plymouth Argyle	Tottenham, London
				Stadium: White Hart Lane

15 December 1906	Crystal Palace	0–2	Plymouth Argyle	Crystal Palace, London
				Stadium: Crystal Palace Stadium

22 December 1906	Brentford	2–2	Plymouth Argyle	Tottenham, London
	Corbett; McAllister			Stadium: White Hart Lane

5 January 1907	New Brompton	0–2	Plymouth Argyle	Gillingham, Kent
				Stadium: Priestfield Stadium

23 March 1907	Plymouth Argyle	0–0	Tottenham Hotspur	Plymouth, Devon
				Stadium: Home Park

20 April 1907	Plymouth Argyle	0–0	Crystal Palace	Plymouth, Devon
				Stadium: Home Park

27 April 1907 38	Plymouth Argyle	1–2	Brentford	Plymouth, Devon
			Hagan; Corbett	Stadium: Home Park

=== Western League ===
==== Results ====
1 September 1906 1	Tottenham Hotspur	0–0	Plymouth Argyle	Tottenham, London
				Stadium: White Hart Lane

12 December 1906	Plymouth Argyle	2–2	Tottenham Hotspur	Plymouth, Devon
				Stadium: Home Park
