= Bob Jack =

Scottish footballer and manager

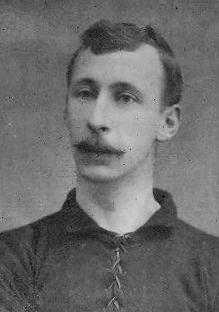
- Jack as a Plymouth Argyle player

Personal information
- Full name: Robert Jack
- Date of birth: 4 April 1876
- Place of birth: Alloa, Scotland
- Date of death: 6 May 1943 (aged 67)
- Place of death: Southend-on-Sea, England
- Position: Outside forward

Senior career*
| Years | Team | Apps | (Gls) |
| 1891–1895 | Alloa Athletic | | |
| 1895–1901 | Bolton Wanderers | 110 | (29) |
| 1901–1902 | Preston North End | 22 | (6) |
| 1902–1903 | Glossop | 30 | (6) |
| 1903–1906 | Plymouth Argyle | 93 | (8) |
| 1906–1910 | Southend United | | |
| 1910 | Plymouth Argyle | 1 | (0) |
| Total | | 256 | (49) |

Managerial career
- 1905–1906: Plymouth Argyle
- 1906–1910: Southend United
- 1910–1938: Plymouth Argyle
- * Club domestic league appearances and goals

Robert Jack (4 April 1876 – 6 May 1943) was a Scottish football player and manager. Born in Alloa, Jack played in the Football League for Bolton Wanderers, Preston North End and Glossop, and the Southern League for Plymouth Argyle and Southend United. He was an outside forward. Jack is Argyle's most successful and longest-serving manager. During his 29 years in charge, the club won two league championships and established itself in the Second Division of the Football League. Jack also managed Southend for four years. His son, David, scored the first goal at Wembley Stadium.

== Playing career ==
Jack began his career with Alloa Athletic, making his debut at the age of 15 and turning professional in 1893. He moved to Bolton Wanderers in 1895. He was Bolton's leading scorer in the 1896–97 season with 11 goals. He played a total for 110 league and 15 FA Cup games for the club, scoring 29 goals. He left Bolton in August 1901, following a serious ankle injury. He joined local rivals Preston North End after scoring 29 goals in 110 league games for Bolton. He spent just one season with Preston, scoring 6 goals in 22 league games, before returning home for a short spell with Alloa at the start of 1902/03, then joining Glossop in late September. After a further 6 goals in 30 appearances he moved to Plymouth Argyle, becoming the club's first professional in 1903. He made his Argyle debut in September 1903 against West Ham United in the Western League. In 1904–05, the club's handbook described him as "our famous flier, probably last season was the best in the player's history".

== Managerial career ==
Following the departure of Frank Brettell, Jack became player-manager of Plymouth Argyle in 1905, 1905–06, and led the club to third in the Western League and fifth in the Southern League. He left the club in the summer to take up the position of player-manager at Southend United. In his first two seasons with Southend they twice won the Southern League Second Division title, gaining election to the Southern League First Division in 1908.

He retired as a player at the end of the 1909–10 season and re-joined Plymouth Argyle as manager, remaining in charge at Home Park until April 1938 when he retired. During his 28 seasons in charge, Jack had guided Argyle to the Southern League title in 1913 and into the Football League in 1920. In their first season in the league they finished 11th in the Third Division, but finished runners-up in all of the next six seasons. They finally clinched the title and promotion in the 1929–30 season. In total, he took charge of 1,093 matches for the "Pilgrims".

== Later life ==
Jack lived in Southend during his retirement, occasionally working as a scout for his son David while he was manager at Southend. In addition to David, two of his other sons, (Rollo and Donald), also played professionally for Bolton Wanderers. Despite being Scottish, Jack represented England at bowls for several years, including being Captain. He won the English Bowling Association Singles Championship in 1926.

His ashes were scattered over the pitch at Home Park, Plymouth.

== Career statistics ==
Managerial record by team and tenure
| Team | From | To | Record | | | | |
| Team | From | To | P | W | D | L | Win % |
|---|---|---|---|---|---|---|---|
| Plymouth Argyle | 1 August 1905 | 31 May 1906 | 57 | 25 | 16 | 16 | 43.9 |
| Southend United | 1906 | 1910 | 116 | 45 | 27 | 44 | 38.8 |
| Plymouth Argyle | 1 August 1910 | 31 May 1938 | 1,036 | 483 | 248 | 305 | 46.6 |
| | | | 1,209 | 553 | 291 | 365 | 45.7 |

== Managerial honours ==
Southend United

- Southern League Second Division
  - Winner (2): 1906–07, 1907–08

Plymouth Argyle

- Southern League First Division
  - Winner (1):1912–13
  - Runner-up (1): 1911–12
- Football League Third Division South
  - Winner (1): 1929–30
  - Runner-up (6): 1921–22, 1922–23, 1923–24, 1924–25, 1925–26, 1926–27
