= Walter Anderson (footballer) =

English footballer

Personal information
- Full name: Walter Anderson
- Date of birth: 1879
- Place of birth: England
- Date of death: 3 March 1904 (aged 25)
- Place of death: London, England
- Position: Inside forward

Senior career*
| Years | Team | Apps | (Gls) |
- Darlington
- Thornaby Utopians
| 1899–1901 | Sheffield United | 4 | (0) |
| 1901–1903 | Woolwich Arsenal | 28 | (10) |
| 1903–1904 | Plymouth Argyle | 31 | (11) |
| Total | | 63 | (21) |
- * Club domestic league appearances and goals

Walter Anderson (1879 – 3 March 1904) was an English professional footballer who played as an inside forward.

A diminutive forward, Anderson began his career with Darlington before moving to Thornaby Utopians. He became a professional in 1899 with Sheffield United and made four appearances in the First Division of the Football League over the next two years. Anderson was transferred to Second Division side Woolwich Arsenal in December 1901. He made his first team debut against Preston North End in a 0–0 draw on 11 January 1902 and scored his first goal for the club in a 3–1 win at Chesterfield Town three weeks later. Having formed a partnership in the team's forward line with Bill Gooing, Anderson scored five goals in 13 league games as the club finished fifth in the Second Division table. The following season, he competed with Tim Coleman for a place in the team. Anderson scored five league goals in 15 matches that season and one in the FA Cup, a 3–1 defeat at home to Sheffield United, taking his overall tally to 11 goals in 30 appearances.

Anderson was transferred to Southern League club Plymouth Argyle in the summer of 1903. Commonly known as Wattie, he was signed by Frank Brettell to form part of the Devon club's first professional squad. He made his debut in a 1–0 win at West Ham United on 1 September 1903 and scored his first goal in a 2–1 win at Portsmouth eight days later. Having established himself as their first choice inside right, he scored a hat-trick against Wellingborough on 5 December at Home Park as part of a 4–1 win. Two months later, Anderson contracted pneumonia. He carried on playing, ignoring doctors' advice that he should rest, and collapsed after a match against Fulham at Craven Cottage on 27 February 1904. He was rushed to hospital and died four days later, at the age of 25. He made 38 appearances in all competitions for Plymouth Argyle, scoring 13 goals. A memorial fund was created by the club in his honour and a souvenir handbook was published, which described Anderson as "one of the greatest, cleverest and whole-hearted players a club ever commanded."
