= 2013–14 Plymouth Argyle F.C. season =

English football club season

Plymouth Argyle
2013–14 season
- Chairman: James Brent
- Manager: John Sheridan
- Stadium: Home Park
- League Two: 10th
- FA Cup: 3rd Round (knocked out by Port Vale)
- Football League Cup: 1st Round (knocked out by Birmingham)
- Football League Trophy: 2nd Round (knocked out by Swindon)
- Top goalscorer: League: Reuben Reid (17); All: Reuben Reid (21)
- Highest home attendance: 13,442 vs. Exeter City (25 March 2014)
- Lowest home attendance: League: 5,689 vs. Newport (22 October 2013); All: 3,324 vs. Lincoln (20 November 2013)
- Average home league attendance: 7,305
Home colours	Away colours

The 2013–14 season was Plymouth Argyle's 87th in the Football League and eighth in the fourth division of English football.

== Current squad ==
As of 28 October 2014

Note: Flags indicate national team as defined under FIFA eligibility rules; some limited exceptions apply. Players may hold more than one non-FIFA nationality.

No.	Pos.	Nation	Player
1	GK	ENG	Jake Cole
2	DF	ENG	Durrell Berry
3	DF	ENG	Andre Blackman
4	DF	FRA	Maxime Blanchard
5	DF	ENG	Guy Branston
6	MF	IRL	Conor Hourihane (Captain)
7	FW	ENG	Lewis Alessandra
8	MF	BEN	Romauld Boco
9	FW	ENG	Reuben Reid
10	FW	GRN	Marvin Morgan
11	MF	ENG	Dominic Blizzard
13	FW	NIR	Caolan Lavery (on loan from Sheffield Wednesday)
14	MF	ENG	Luke Young
15	MF	ENG	Paul Wotton
16	DF	ENG	Neal Trotman

No.	Pos.	Nation	Player
17	DF	ENG	Curtis Nelson
18	FW	ENG	Tyler Harvey
19	FW	ENG	Paul Hayes
19	MF	ENG	Nathan Thomas
20	MF	ENG	Jason Banton
20	MF	ALG	Hamza Bencherif
21	FW	ENG	Matt Lecointe
22	DF	ENG	Jamie Richards
23	GK	ENG	Luke McCormick
24	FW	ENG	Isaac Vassell
25	DF	ENG	Ben Purrington
26/28	FW	ENG	Tope Obadeyi (on loan from Bury)
26	DF	ENG	Matthew Parsons
27	MF	ARG	Andres Gurrieri
28	DF	ENG	Jamie Reckord (on loan from Wolverhampton Wanderers)
29	FW	NGR	Enoch Showunmi (on loan from Notts County)

Last updated: 29 October 2014
Source:Greens on Screen

== Pre-season ==
=== Matches ===
9 July	Elburton Villa	0–3	Plymouth Argyle	Plymouth
19:30 BST		Report	18' Lecointe; 47' (pen.) Morgan; 70' (pen.) Reid	Stadium: Haye Road

13 July	Tiverton Town	0–1	Plymouth Argyle	Tiverton
15:00 BST		Report	51' Feeney	Stadium: Ladysmead; Attendance: 441

16 July	Bath City	0–0	Plymouth Argyle	Bath
19:30 BST		Report		Stadium: Twerton Park; Attendance: 549; Referee: Adam Penwell

21 July	Plymouth Argyle	1–1	Milton Keynes Dons	Plymouth
15:00 BST	79'		87'	Stadium: Home Park

27 July	Plymouth Argyle	1–2	Yeovil Town	Plymouth
15:00 BST	Tyler Harvey	Report	(x2) Hayter	Stadium: Home Park; Attendance: 2,492

Last updated: 29 October 2014
Source:Greens on Screen

== League Two ==
=== League table ===
Pos	Team	Pld	W	D	L	GF	GA	GD	Pts
8	Oxford United	46	16	14	16	53	50	+3	62
9	Dagenham & Redbridge	46	15	15	16	53	59	−6	60
10	Plymouth Argyle	46	16	12	18	51	58	−7	60
11	Mansfield Town	46	15	15	16	49	58	−9	60
12	Bury	46	13	20	13	59	51	+8	59

Updated to match(es) played on 3 May 2014. Source: BBC Sport
Rules for classification: 1) Points; 2) Goal difference; 3) Number of goals scored

=== Result Summary ===
Overall								Home						Away					
Pld	W	D	L	GF	GA	GD	Pts	W	D	L	GF	GA	GD	W	D	L	GF	GA	GD
19	6	5	8	17	21	−4	23	4	3	3	7	8	−1	2	2	5	10	13	−3

Last updated: 02 October 2014

=== Matches ===
3 August 2013 1	Southend United	1–0	Plymouth Argyle	Southend-on-Sea
15:00 BST	Corr 15'	Report		Stadium: Roots Hall; Attendance: 7,055; Referee: Rob Lewis

10 August 2013 2	Plymouth Argyle	0–2	Fleetwood Town	Plymouth
15:00 BST		Report	10', 12' Ball	Stadium: Home Park; Attendance: 7,280; Referee: Chris Sarginson

17 August 2013 3	Cheltenham Town	1–3	Plymouth Argyle	Cheltenham
15:00 BST	Richards 72'	Report	18' Morgan; 27' Hourihane; 38' Boco	Stadium: Whaddon Road; Attendance: 3,450; Referee: Breakspear

24 August 2013 4	Plymouth Argyle	1–0	Rochdale	Plymouth
15:00 BST	Reid 25' (pen.)	Report		Stadium: Home Park; Attendance: 6,978; Referee: Malone

31 August 2013 5	Morecambe	2–1	Plymouth Argyle	Morecambe
15:00 BST	Ellison 29'; Amond 84'	Report	27' (pen.) Reid	Stadium: Globe Arena; Attendance: 1,800; Referee: Harrington

7 September 2013 6	Plymouth Argyle	1–0	Bristol Rovers	Plymouth
15:00 BST	Reid 82'	Report		Stadium: Home Park; Attendance: 8,631; Referee: Andy Davies

14 September 2013 7	Plymouth Argyle	0–3	Wycombe Wanderers	Plymouth
15:00 BST		Report	70' Wood; 74' Morgan; 90' Knott	Stadium: Home Park; Attendance: 6,702; Referee: Hooper

21 September 2013 8	Scunthorpe United	1–0	Plymouth Argyle	Scunthorpe
15:00 BST	Esajas 62'	Report		Stadium: Glanford Park; Attendance: 3,298; Referee: Scott

28 September 2013 9	Plymouth Argyle	0–0	Accrington Stanley	Plymouth
15:00 BST		Report		Stadium: Home Park; Attendance: 6,180; Referee: Bratt

5 October 2013 10	Exeter City	3–1	Plymouth Argyle	Exeter
15:00 BST	Davies 56'; Gow 83'; Bennett 90'	Report	69' Young	Stadium: St James Park; Attendance: 5,700; Referee: Andre Marriner

12 October 2013 11	Plymouth Argyle	1–1	Portsmouth	Plymouth
15:00 BST	Hourihane 21'	Report	39' Wallace	Stadium: Home Park; Attendance: 9,742; Referee: Steve Martin

19 October 2013 12	Hartlepool United	1–0	Plymouth Argyle	Hartlepool
15:00 BST	Compton (red card) 27'; James 55'	Report		Stadium: Victoria Park; Attendance: 3,929; Referee: Scott Mathieson

22 October 2013 13	Plymouth Argyle	0–0	Newport County	Plymouth
19:45 BST		Report		Stadium: Home Park; Attendance: 5,689; Referee: Oliver Langford

26 October 2013 14	Mansfield Town	0–1	Plymouth Argyle	Mansfield
15:00 BST		Report	90' Trotman	Stadium: Field Mill; Attendance: 3,379; Referee: Garry Sutton

2 November 2013 15	Plymouth Argyle	1–0	Northampton Town	Plymouth
15:00 BST	Alessandra 90'	Report		Stadium: Home Park; Attendance: 6,547; Referee: Trevor Kettle

16 November 2013 16	York City	1–1	Plymouth Argyle	York
15:00 BST	Bowman 54'	Report	65' Obadeyi	Stadium: Bootham Crescent; Attendance: 3,803; Referee: Seb Stockbridge

23 November 2013 17	Plymouth Argyle	2–1	Dagenham & Redbridge	Plymouth
15:00 BST	Reid 44'; Young 77'	Report	45' Hines	Stadium: Home Park; Attendance: 6,184; Referee: Steven Rushton

27 November 2013 18	Torquay United	1–1	Plymouth Argyle	Torquay
19:45 BST	Benyon 6'	Report	9' (pen.) Reid	Stadium: Plainmoor; Attendance: 3,866; Referee: Roger East

30 November 2013 19	Plymouth Argyle	0–1	Burton Albion	Plymouth
15:00 BST		Report	12' McGurk	Stadium: Home Park; Attendance: 6,294; Referee: Graham Salisbury

14 December 2013 20	Chesterfield	2–0	Plymouth Argyle	Chesterfield
15:00 BST	9' Brown; 42' (pen.) Richards	BBC Sport		Stadium: Proact Stadium; Attendance: 4,486; Referee: Andy Haines

21 December 2013 21	Plymouth Argyle	2–1	Bury	Plymouth
15:00 BST	Lavery 11'; Reid 78'	Report	49' Sedgwick	Stadium: Home Park; Attendance: 6,206; Referee: Michael Bull

26 December 2013 22	Oxford United	2–3	Plymouth Argyle	Oxford
15:00 BST	Hall 66'; Trotman 88' (o.g.)	Report	46' Lavery; Reid 81' (pen.), 87'	Stadium: Kassam Stadium; Attendance: 10,049; Referee: Andy Davies

29 December 2013 23	AFC Wimbledon	1–1	Plymouth Argyle	London
15:00 BST	Smith 47'	Report	88' Reid	Stadium: Kingsmeadow; Attendance: 4,763; Referee: Andy Woolmer

1 January 2014 24	Plymouth Argyle	2–0	Torquay United	Plymouth
15:00 GMT	Lavery 60'; Alessandra 85'	Report		Stadium: Home Park; Attendance: 10,126; Referee: Keith Stroud

11 January 2014 25	Plymouth Argyle	1–1	Southend United	Plymouth
15:00 BST	Blizzard 65'	Report	68' Hurst	Stadium: Home Park; Attendance: 7,088; Referee: Tim Robinson

18 January 2014 26	Rochdale	3–0	Plymouth Argyle	Rochdale
15:00	Allen 4'; Henderson 75'; Rose 89'	Report	Gurrieri (red card) 53'; Blanchard (yellow card) 82'; Purrington (yellow card) 85'	Stadium: Spotland; Attendance: 2,839; Referee: Mark Brown

25 January 2014 27	Plymouth Argyle	1–1	Cheltenham Town	Plymouth
15:00	Young 84'; Hourihane (yellow card) 30'; Nelson (yellow card) 73'	Report	Harrison 53'; Richards (yellow card) 83'	Stadium: Home Park; Attendance: 6,735; Referee: Lee Collins

1 February 2014 28	Plymouth Argyle	1–1	Mansfield Town	Plymouth
15:00	Alessandra 90'; McCormick (yellow card) 62'; Trotman (yellow card) 62'	Report	Rhead 74'; Dempster (yellow card) 13'	Stadium: Home Park; Attendance: 6,248; Referee: Peter Bankes

8 February 2014 29	Northampton Town	0–2	Plymouth Argyle	Northampton
15:00	Widdowson (yellow card) 82'	Report	Reid 5'; Alessandra 39'	Stadium: Sixfields Stadium; Attendance: 4,845; Referee: Nigel Miller

15 February 2014 30	Plymouth Argyle	0–4	York City	Plymouth
15:00	Trotman (red card) 11'; Reid (yellow card) 80'; Thomas (yellow card) 90'	Report	Fletcher 12'; McCombe (yellow card) 20'; Penn (yellow card) 22'; McCombe 45'; Lowe (yellow card) 65'; McCombe 89'; Carson 90'	Stadium: Home Park; Attendance: 6,502; Referee: Charles Breakspear

22 February 2014 31	Dagenham and Redbridge	1–2	Plymouth Argyle	Dagenham
15:00	Hines 23'; Bingham (yellow card) 58'; Doe (yellow card) 88'	Report	Reid 5'; Alessandra 33'; Berry (yellow card) 60'	Stadium: Victoria Road; Attendance: 2,027; Referee: Michael Naylor

25 February 2014 32	Fleetwood Town	0–4	Plymouth Argyle	Fleetwood
19:45	McLaughlin (yellow card) 85'; Sarcevic (yellow card) 88'	Report	Reid 22'; Young 47'; Blanchard 70'; Wotton (yellow card) 75'; Hourihane 86'	Stadium: Highbury Stadium; Attendance: 2,131; Referee: Steve Bratt

1 March 2014 33	Plymouth Argyle	5–0	Morecambe	Plymouth
15:00	Berry 5'; Alessandra 40', 90'; Nelson 77'; Gurrieri 87'	Report	Kenyon (yellow card) 70'	Stadium: Home Park; Attendance: 6,827; Referee: Graham Horwood

8 March 2014 34	Bristol Rovers	2–1	Plymouth Argyle	Bristol
15:00	Beardsley 7'; Mohamed 71' (yellow card) 78'	Report	Blanchard (yellow card) 17'; Wotton (yellow card) 23'; Trotman 45'	Stadium: Memorial Ground; Attendance: 7,799; Referee: James Linington

11 March 2014 35	Wycombe Wanderers	0–1	Plymouth Argyle	High Wycombe
19:45		Report	Hourihane 48'; Trotman (yellow card) 72'	Stadium: Adams Park; Attendance: 3,042 (612 Away); Referee: Andy Davies (referee)

15 March 2014 36	Plymouth Argyle	0–2	Scunthorpe United	Plymouth
15:00	Hourihane (yellow card) 73'	Report	Syers 79'; Cole(o.g.); Slocombe (yellow card) 90'	Stadium: Home Park; Attendance: 8,198; Referee: Darren Drysdale

18 March 2014 37	Plymouth Argyle	2–1	Chesterfield	Plymouth
19:45	Reid 28' 58'	Report	Humphreys 57'; Cooper (yellow card) 60'; Bennett (yellow card) 87'	Stadium: Home Park; Attendance: 6,012; Referee: Oliver Langford

22 March 2014 38	Accrington Stanley	1–1	Plymouth Argyle	Accrington
15:00	Gray (yellow card) 33'; Hatfield (yellow card) 45'; Buxton (yellow card) 78'; Aldred 81'	Report	Reid 32'	Stadium: Crown Ground; Attendance: 1,557 (447 away); Referee: Trevor Kettle

25 March 2014 39	Plymouth Argyle	1–2	Exeter City	Plymouth
19:45	Nelson (yellow card) 36'; Reid (pen.), 45'; Wotton (yellow card) 70'	Report	Gill (yellow card) 40'; Coles (yellow card) 45'; Sercombe 69'; Richard 83'	Stadium: Home Park; Attendance: 13,442 (826 Away); Referee: Bobby Madley

5 April 2014 40	Burton Albion	1–0	Plymouth Argyle	Burton-upon-Trent
15:00	McFadzean 26' (yellow card) 58'	Report	Hourihane (yellow card) 60'	Stadium: Pirelli Stadium; Attendance: 2,962; Referee: Mark Haywood

8 April 2014 41	Newport County	1–2	Plymouth Argyle	Newport, Wales
19:45	Zebroski 27'; Feely (yellow card) 59'	Report	Harvey 21'; Hourihane 30'	Stadium: Rodney Parade; Attendance: 3,381 (1,002 Away); Referee: Scott Mathieson (referee)

12 April 2014 42	Plymouth Argyle	0–2	Oxford United	Plymouth
15:07	Blanchard (yellow card) 32' (red card) 50'	Report	Kitson 33'; Constable 58'	Stadium: Home Park; Attendance: 8,161 (451 Away); Referee: Mick Russell

18 April 2014 43	Bury	4–0	Plymouth Argyle	Bury
15:00	Tutte 8'; Nardiello 49' 53' (pen.); Rose 87'	Report	Berry (yellow card) 86'	Stadium: Gigg Lane; Attendance: 3,401 (553 away); Referee: Eddie Ilderton

21 April 2014 44	Plymouth Argyle	1–2	AFC Wimbledon	Plymouth
15:00	Hourihane 7'; Wotton (yellow card) 42'; Reid (yellow card) 68'	Report	Moore (yellow card) 36'; Midson 42'; Appiah 59' (yellow card) 90'	Stadium: Home Park; Attendance: 6,618 (270 Away); Referee: Keith Hill

26 April 2014 45	Plymouth Argyle	1–1	Hartlepool United	Plymouth
15:00	Banton 31'	Report	Barmby 67'	Stadium: Home Park; Attendance: 6,617 (246 Away); Referee: Gary Sutton

3 May 2014 46	Portsmouth	3–3	Plymouth Argyle	Portsmouth
15:00	Hollands 32', 38', 47'	Report	Trotman (yellow card) 22'; Reid 35'; Berry (yellow card) 36'; Hourihane 41', 89'	Stadium: Fratton Park; Attendance: 18,026 (1,594 Away); Referee: Stuart Attwell

Last updated: 29 October 2013 2014
Source:Greens on Screen

== FA Cup ==
=== Matches ===
9 November Round 1	Lincoln City	0–0	Plymouth Argyle	Lincoln
15:00 BST		Report		Stadium: Sincil Bank; Attendance: 2,924; Referee: Scott Duncan

20 November Round 1 Replay	Plymouth Argyle	5–0	Lincoln City	Plymouth
19:45 BST	Reid 4', 24' (pen.), 35'; Alessandra 5'; Boyce 65' (o.g.)	Report		Stadium: Home Park; Attendance: 3,324; Referee: Darren Deadman

7 December Round 2	Plymouth Argyle	3–1	Welling United	Plymouth
15:00 BST	Gurrieri 13'; Nelson 18'; Alessandra 21'	Report	53' Lafayette	Stadium: Home Park; Attendance: 4,706; Referee: Steve Bratt

5 January Round 3	Port Vale	2–2	Plymouth Argyle	Stoke-on-Trent
15:00 BST	Reid 51'Purrington 74'	Report	Tomlin 15'Pope 36'	Stadium: Vale Park; Attendance: 5,511; Referee: David Webb

14 January Round 3 Replay	Plymouth Argyle	2–3	Port Vale	Plymouth
19:45 BST	Gurrieri 2'Hourihane 36'	Report	Hugill 30' Williamson 63' Jennison Myrie-Williams 75' Lines (red card)	Stadium: Home Park; Attendance: 6,474; Referee: Graham Scott

Last updated: 29 October 2014
Source:Greens on Screen

== League Cup ==
=== Matches ===
6 August Round 1	Birmingham City	3–2 (a.e.t.)	Plymouth Argyle	Birmingham
19:45 BST	Allan 49', 84'; Bartley 92'	Report	61', 90+2' Alessandra	Stadium: St Andrew's; Attendance: 10,178; Referee: Graham Salisbury

Last updated: 29 October 2014
Source:Greens on Screen

== Football League Trophy ==
=== Matches ===
2 September Round 1	Cheltenham Town	3–3 (a.e.t.) (4–5 p)	Plymouth Argyle	Cheltenham
19:45 BST	Gillespie 6', 63'; Taylor 67'	Report	16' Boco; 17' Alessandra; 58' Bencherif; (red card) 62' Nelson	Stadium: Whaddon Road; Attendance: 1,236; Referee: Mark Heywood
	Penalties
	Lowe (penalty scored); Noble (penalty scored); Deering (penalty scored); Taylor (penalty scored); Gillespie (penalty missed)		(penalty scored) Boco; (penalty scored) Alessandra; (penalty scored) Hourihane; (penalty scored) Reckord; (penalty scored) Morgan

Last updated: 29 October 2014
Source:Greens on Screen

== Kit ==
Supplier: Puma
Sponsor(s): WH Bond
First European Securities (back of shirts)

Home	Away

Last updated: 9 June 2013.

== Appearance / Goals / Disciplinary ==
No	Nat	Pos	Name	Appearances	Sub App	Goals	Yellow card	Red card
1	(England)	GK	Jake Cole	27	1	0	0	0
2	(England)	RB	Durrell Berry	33	6	1	8	0
3	(England)	LB	Andre Blackman	6	3	1	0	0
4	(France)	CB	Maxime Blanchard	40	3	1	5	1
5	(England)	CB	Guy Branston	12	1	0	6	0
6	(Republic of Ireland)	CM	Conor Hourihane	53	0	9	8	0
7	(England)	CAM	Lewis Alessandra	46	3	12	2	0
8	(Benin)	CM	Romauld Bocu	26	8	2	2	0
9	(England)	ST	Reuben Reid	52	2	21	5	0
10	(England)	ST	Marvin Morgan	12	11	1	2	0
11	(England)	CM	Dominic Blizzard	24	7	1	1	0
13	(Northern Ireland)	ST	Caolan Lavery	4	4	3	1	0
14	(England)	CM	Luke Young	24	15	4	1	0
15	(England)	CB/CM	Paul Wotton	12	3	0	4	0
16	(England)	CB	Neal Trotman	48	0	2	5	1
17	(England)	CB	Curtis Nelson	51	1	2	4	1
18	(England)	ST	Tyler Harvey	3	21	1	1	0
19	(England)	ST	Paul Hayes	5	2	0	0	0
19	(England)	RM	Nathan Thomas	2	10	0	1	0
20	(England)	LM	Jason Banton	11	2	1	0	0
20	(Algeria)	CM	Hamza Bencherif	6	3	1	0	0
21	(England)	ST	Matt Lecointe	0	0	0	0	0
22	(England)	CB	Jamie Richards	0	1	0	0	0
23	(England)	GK	Luke McCormick	27	1	0	1	0
24	(England)	ST	Isaac Vassell	1	1	0	0	0
25	(England)	RB	Ben Purrington	12	2	1	2	0
26/28	(England)	ST	Tope Obadeyi	7	10	1	0	0
26	(England)	LB	Matt Parsons	10	0	0	0	0
27	(Argentina)	CAM	Andres Gurrieri	23	13	3	2	1
28	(England)	LB	Jamie Reckford	15	1	0	0	0
29	(England)	ST	Enoch Showunmi	2	5	0	0	0

Last updated: 29 October 2014
Source:Greens on Screen

== Transfers ==
=== Contracts ===
No.	Pos.	Nat.	Name	Age	Status	Contract length	Expiry date	Source
25	DF	(England)	Ben Purrington	17	Signed			
5	DF	(England)	Guy Branston	34	Signed	1 year	June 2014	
6	MF	(Republic of Ireland)	Conor Hourihane	22	Signed	2 years	June 2015	
1	GK	(England)	Jake Cole	27	Signed	1 year	June 2014	
25	FW	(England)	Isaac Vassell	19	Signed	1 year	June 2014	
27	MF	(Argentina) (Switzerland)	Andres Gurrieri	23	Signed	1 year	June 2014	
14	DF	(Zimbabwe)	Onismor Bhasera	27	Rejected	Rejected	June 2013	

=== In ===
No.	Pos.	Nat.	Name	Age	EU	Moving from	Type	Transfer window	Ends	Transfer fee	Source
23	GK	(England)	Luke McCormick	29	EU	Oxford United	Free Transfer	Summer	2014	Free	
7	FW	(England)	Lewis Alessandra	24	EU	Morecambe	Free Transfer	Summer	2015	Free	
9	FW	(England)	Reuben Reid	24	EU	Yeovil Town	Loan	Summer	2014	Season Long Loan	
11	MF	(England)	Dominic Blizzard	27	EU	Yeovil Town	Free Transfer	Summer	2015	Free	
10	FW	(England)	Marvin Morgan	30	EU	Shrewsbury Town	Free Transfer	Summer	2015	Free	
8	MF	(Benin) (France)	Romauld Boco	28	EU	Accrington Stanley	Free Transfer	Summer	2014	Free	
3	DF	(England)	Andre Blackman	22	EU	Free agent	Free Transfer	Summer	2014	Free	
16	DF	(England)	Neal Trotman	27	EU	Chesterfield	Free Transfer	Summer	2014	Free	
20	MF	(Algeria) (France)	Hamza Bencherif	25	EU	Notts County	Free Transfer	Summer	2014	Free	
19	MF	(England)	Nathan Thomas	19	EU	Darlington 1883	Free Transfer	Winter	2014	Free	

=== Loans in ===
No.	Pos.	Name	Country	Age	Loan club	Started	Ended	Start source	End source
28	DF	Jamie Reckord	(England)	21	Wolverhampton Wanderers	2 September	1 January		
26	FW	Tope Obadeyi	(England)	38	Bury	7 November			
13	FW	Caolan Lavery	(Northern Ireland) (Canada)	34	Sheffield Wednesday	22 November	1 January		

Sources: For loan start source see "Start source". For loan end source see "End source".
EU = if holds or not a European Union passport; Country: when 2 flags, 1st flag = country that plays for internationally, 2nd flag = country of birth; No. = number on jersey; P = Position (for position name, pause mouse pointer on abbreviation); Name = Name on jersey (for more extensive name, pause mouse pointer on name); In/Out = In: The player came in on loan, Out: The player went out on loan; Loan club = the club that the player moved on loan to or the club that the player came from on loan; Started = the date when the player's loan started; Ended = the date when the player's loan ended.

=== Out ===
No.	Pos.	Name	Country	Age	Type	Moving to	Transfer window	Transfer fee	Apps	Goals	Source
13	GK	Ollie Chenoweth	(England)	21	Contract Ended	Truro City	Summer	Free	1	0	
26	DF	Anthony Charles	(England)	32	Contract Ended	Luton Town	Summer	Free	11	0	
11	FW	Warren Feeney	(Northern Ireland)	32	Contract Ended	Salisbury City	Summer	Free	52	6	
16	MF	Jamie Lowry	(England)	26	Contract Ended	Free agent	Summer	Free	11	0	
22	FW	Jared Sims	(England)	19	Contract Ended	Truro City	Summer	Free	6	0	
20	GK	Rene Gilmartin	(Republic of Ireland)	26	Contract Terminated	St Patrick's Athletic (Republic of Ireland)	Summer	Free	16	0	
7	FW	Paris Cowan-Hall	(England)	22	Transfer	Wycombe Wanderers	Summer	Free	45	5	
14	DF	Onismor Bhasera	(Zimbabwe)	27	Contract Ended	Free agent	Summer	Free	114	4	

EU = if holds or not a European Union passport; Country: when 2 flags, 1st flag = country that plays for internationally, 2nd flag = country of birth; N = number on jersey; P = Position (for position name, pause mouse pointer on abbreviation); Name = Name on jersey (for more extensive name, pause mouse pointer on name); Age = age on the day of the signing; Moving from = only indicate the club the player was playing before start playing for this club in this season, for the type of the moving see Status column; Moving to = only indicates the club the player is going to play next, for the type of the moving see Status column; Ends = when the player's current contract ends; n/a = Not applicable; Apps = Total number of competitive appearances (including substitute appearances) at the club prior to departure; Goals = Total number of competitive goals scored at the club prior to departure.
