= Mike Bickle (footballer) =

English footballer (1944–2023)

Personal information
- Full name: Michael John Bickle
- Date of birth: 25 January 1944
- Place of birth: Plymouth, Devon, England
- Date of death: 22 November 2023 (aged 79)
- Place of death: Plymouth, Devon, England
- Position: Striker

Senior career*
Years	Team	Apps	(Gls)
- St Austell
1965–1971	Plymouth Argyle	179	(71)
1971–1973	Gillingham	32	(7)
- * Club domestic league appearances and goals

Michael John Bickle (25 January 1944 – 22 November 2023) was an English professional footballer. A striker, he played for Plymouth Argyle and Gillingham between 1965 and 1973, before his career was cut short by injury.

== Career ==
Bickle was born in Plymouth but began his footballing career playing semi-professionally for St Austell of the South Western Football League while working as a milkman. Playing as a striker, he gained a reputation as a highly prolific goalscorer, attracting the attention of professional clubs, and in December 1965, at the age of nearly 22, turned professional with his hometown team, Plymouth Argyle, then of the Football League Second Division. He adjusted quickly to the higher level of football and scored 9 goals in just 17 games in his first season. He went on to be the club's top goalscorer for the following four consecutive seasons, and in total scored 71 goals in 179 league matches, but was unable to save the club from relegation to the Football League Third Division in the 1967–68 season. In November 1971 Gillingham manager Andy Nelson, who had played alongside Bickle at Home Park, signed him for the Kent-based club, after weeks of press speculation, for a fee of around £7,000.

Bickle's arrival at Priestfield Stadium saw him replacing Tommy Watson in a team struggling after relegation to the Football League Fourth Division, and he began his Gillingham career strongly, with two goals in his first five matches. He finished the 1971–72 season with seven goals to his name, making him the team's third-highest scorer. Just six matches into the following season, however, he suffered a neck injury in a match against Stockport County which kept him out of action for over two months. He made his comeback against Reading in the FA Cup in November 1972, but injured his shoulder during his comeback match and never played for the team again. In January 1973 he accepted the advice of a medical specialist and retired from the sport. He returned to his native West Country, where he worked in a dockyard before retiring around 2010.

== Death ==
Bickle died on 22 November 2023, at the age of 79.
