= Rollo Jack =

English footballer

Personal information
- Full name: Robert Rollo Jack
- Date of birth: 4 April 1902
- Place of birth: Bolton, England
- Date of death: 1994 (aged 91–92)
- Height: 5 ft 11 in (1.80 m)
- Position: Inside right

Youth career
- Argyle Juniors

Senior career*
Years	Team	Apps	(Gls)
1922–1923	Plymouth Argyle	15	(4)
1923–1929	Bolton Wanderers	29	(9)
1929–1932?	Clapton Orient	79	(22)
1932?–1934?	Yeovil and Petters United	?	
1934–1935	Swindon Town	20	(2)
Total		143	(37)
- * Club domestic league appearances and goals

Robert Rollo Jack (4 April 1902 – 1994) was an English footballer who played primarily as an inside right in the Football League in the 1920s and 1930s.

He was the brother of David, the England international footballer, whilst his father Bob was also a professional footballer and manager.

Rollo started as a trainee with Plymouth Argyle, making his debut on 23 December 1922 against Watford, before moving north to join Bolton Wanderers for £1500, where his brother was playing. He made his debut for Bolton on 22 December 1923 against Notts County. However, in six seasons with Bolton he only made 29 League appearances. He then moved to Clapton Orient in September 1929 for £1000 and he played regularly for them over the next three seasons. Rollo then moved into non-league football with Yeovil and Petters United of the Southern Football League, before a transfer back to the Football League with Swindon Town for the 1934–35 season, and he made 20 league appearances for Swindon, scoring on two occasions.
