= Charlie Clark (Scottish footballer) =

Scottish footballer (1877–1931)

Personal information
- Full name: Charles Waldern Clark
- Date of birth: 12 July 1877
- Place of birth: Allanton, North Lanarkshire, Scotland
- Date of death: 5 May 1931 (aged 53)
- Place of death: Rhode Island, USA
- Position: Centre half

Senior career*
Years	Team	Apps	(Gls)
–	Thorniewood		
1898–1901	Hamilton Academical	44	(7)
1901–1903	Everton	6	(1)
1903–1909	Plymouth Argyle	255	(8)
1909–1910	Crystal Palace	31	(0)
- * Club domestic league appearances and goals

Charlie Clark (12 July 1877 – 5 May 1931) was a Scottish footballer who played in the Football League for Everton, and the Southern League for Plymouth Argyle and Crystal Palace. He was a Centre half.

== Life and career ==
Clark was born in Allanton, North Lanarkshire. He began his career with a club of the same name before joining Hamilton Academical, initially playing as a forward. He was signed by Everton in 1901 and made six league appearances over two seasons, in which he scored one goal.

In 1903, Clark joined Plymouth Argyle and was the club's first choice centre half for the next six years. In his second season with Argyle, he received a Western League winner's medal and made 54 appearances in all competitions, scoring in three of them. Described as "absolutely untiring" and "always a dominating factor in a game", Clark was an extremely popular club captain. He played in excess of 40 matches per season for Argyle until his last.

Clark made his final Plymouth appearance in April 1909, which took his overall tally to 272 in league and cup competition, with nine goals. He left the club later that year and moved to Crystal Palace, where he made 32 appearances in all competitions (31 league appearances) without scoring. Clark retired from playing in 1910. He emigrated the following year, 1911 to possibly Canada first but ended up in the United States as a private gardener on an estate on Rhode Island, where he remained until his death

== Honours ==
- Western League First Division: 1904–05
