= John Banks (footballer) =

English footballer

Personal information
- Full name: John Banks
- Date of birth: 14 June 1875
- Place of birth: West Bromwich, England
- Date of death: January 1947 (aged 71)
- Height: 1.75 m (5 ft 9 in)
- Position: Wing half

Youth career
- –: Oldbury Broadwell

Senior career*
Years	Team	Apps	(Gls)
1893–1901	West Bromwich Albion	119	(5)
1901–1903	Manchester United	40	(0)
1903–1906	Plymouth Argyle	75	(4)
–	Leyton	?	(?)
–	Exeter City	?	(?)
- * Club domestic league appearances and goals

John Banks (14 June 1875 – January 1947) was an English footballer who played as a wing half for West Bromwich Albion, Manchester United, Plymouth Argyle, Leyton and Exeter City. He made 159 appearances in the Football League. Commonly known as Johnny and Jack, the 1904–05 Plymouth Argyle handbook describes Banks as being "splendid in defence and rarely beaten".

== Life and career ==
Born in West Bromwich, Banks could also play as an outside forward when required. He began his career as an amateur with Oldbury Broadwell before joining the Football League club West Bromwich Albion on professional terms in 1893. He made 119 league appearances during his time with the club and scored five goals. Banks was transferred to Manchester United in 1901 and spent two years at Old Trafford, where he appeared in 40 league matches. In 1903, he signed for Plymouth Argyle of the Southern League. The Argyle handbook of 1904–05 describes him as being "splendid in defence and rarely beaten". After three years with the club, during which time he scored five goals in 82 league and cup games, Banks was released in 1906. He went on to play for Leyton and Exeter City. He died in January 1947.
