= Herbert Winterhalder =

English footballer

Personal information
- Full name: Herbert Tirrell Winterhalder
- Date of birth: 13 May 1879
- Place of birth: Kettering, England
- Date of death: Sep qtr 1946 (aged 67)
- Place of death: Kettering, England
- Position: Outside forward

Senior career*
Years	Team	Apps	(Gls)
–	Kettering		
1902–1903	Sheffield United	11	(2)
1903–1904	Plymouth Argyle	28	(2)
1904–1905	Wellingborough		
1905–1906	West Ham United	4	(0)
- * Club domestic league appearances and goals

Herbert Tirrell Winterhalder (13 May 1879 – Sep qtr 1946) was an English footballer who played in the Football League for Sheffield United, and the Southern League for Kettering, Plymouth Argyle, Wellingborough and West Ham United. He was an outside forward.
