= 1907–08 Plymouth Argyle F.C. season =

English football club season

Plymouth Argyle
1907–08 season
- President: Clarence Spooner
- Manager: None (committee)
- Southern League: 2nd
- Western League: 4th
- FA Cup: Second Round
Home colours

The 1907–08 season was the fifth competitive season in the history of Plymouth Argyle Football Club. They competed in the Southern League and the Western League.

== Competitions ==
=== Southern League ===
==== Table ====
Pos	Team	Pld	W	D	L	GF	GA	GR	Pts
1	Queens Park Rangers	38	21	9	8	82	57	1.439	51
2	Plymouth Argyle	38	19	11	8	50	31	1.613	49
3	Millwall	38	19	8	11	49	32	1.531	46
4	Crystal Palace	38	17	10	11	54	51	1.059	44
5	Swindon Town	38	16	10	12	55	40	1.375	42

Rules for classification: The system of using goal average to separate two teams tied on points was used until the 1976-77 season. The points system: 2 points for a win, 1 point for a draw and 0 points for losing.

==== Results ====
14 September 1907	Crystal Palace	0–4	Plymouth Argyle	Crystal Palace, London
				Stadium: Crystal Palace Stadium; Attendance: 8,000

26 October 1907	Brentford	2–1	Plymouth Argyle	Brentford, London
	Parsonage; Corbett			Stadium: Griffin Park

21 December 1907	Plymouth Argyle	1–0	New Brompton	Plymouth, Devon
				Stadium: Home Park; Attendance: 7,500

20 January 1908	Tottenham Hotspur	0–1	Plymouth Argyle	Tottenham, London
				Stadium: White Hart Lane

22 February 1908	Plymouth Argyle	2–1	Brentford	Plymouth, Devon
			og' Black	Stadium: Home Park

8 April 1908	Plymouth Argyle	1–1	Crystal Palace	Plymouth, Devon
			Bauchop	Stadium: Home Park; Attendance: 7,000

18 April 1908	New Brompton	0–3	Plymouth Argyle	Gillingham, Kent
				Stadium: Priestfield Stadium; Attendance: 5,000

20 April 1908 38	Plymouth Argyle	1–0	Tottenham Hotspur	Plymouth, Devon
				Stadium: Home Park

=== Western League ===
==== Table ====
Pos	Team	Pld	W	D	L	GF	GA	GAv	Pts
1	Southampton	12	8	1	3	30	12	2.500	17
2	Portsmouth	12	7	1	4	25	13	1.923	15
3	Brighton & Hove Albion	12	6	2	4	19	19	1.000	14
4	Plymouth Argyle	12	5	2	5	14	17	0.824	12
5	Queens Park Rangers	12	5	1	6	20	23	0.870	11
6	Brentford	12	2	5	5	13	21	0.619	9
7	Leyton	12	2	2	8	11	27	0.407	6
