= Maurice Tadman =

English footballer (1921–1994)

- Tadman during his time with Plymouth Argyle

Personal information
- Full name: Maurice Roy Tadman
- Date of birth: 28 June 1921
- Place of birth: Rainham, England
- Date of death: 27 November 1994 (aged 73)
- Position: Centre forward

Youth career
- –1938: Bexleyheath & Welling
- 1938–1946: Charlton Athletic

Senior career*
Years	Team	Apps	(Gls)
1946–1947	Charlton Athletic	3	(0)
1947–1955	Plymouth Argyle	240	(108)
1955–1957	Distillery	62	(55)
Total		305	(163)

Managerial career
- 1955–1958: Distillery
- * Club domestic league appearances and goals

Maurice Roy Tadman (28 June 1921 – 26 November 1994) was an English footballer who played as a centre forward.

He began his career in non-league football with Bexleyheath & Welling before playing alongside his older brother George at Charlton Athletic. His progress was halted by the Second World War, but he returned to the club when hostilities had ceased. Despite being a prolific goalscorer for the club's reserve team, he was unable to force his way into the first team and was transferred to Plymouth Argyle for £4,000 in August 1947. He soon established himself as the club's first choice striker and finished as top goalscorer in five of his first seven seasons at Home Park. He left the club in 1955, having joined an elite group of players to have scored more than 100 goals, to finish his career in Northern Ireland as player-manager of Distillery.

== Playing career ==
Tadman began his career with local team Bexleyheath & Welling, before joining his older brother, George, at Charlton Athletic. His progress there was halted due to the outbreak of the Second World War. He resumed his career after hostilities had ended, making three appearances for Charlton before joining Plymouth Argyle in the summer of 1947. He would spend the next eight years with the club, playing alongside other Argyle greats like Jack Chisholm, George Dews, Neil Dougall, Alex Govan, and Bill Shortt. His one major honour with the club came in 1952 when the Pilgrims won the Third Division South title and promotion back to the Second Division. He made 253 appearances in all competitions for the club, scoring 112 goals, before moving to Northern Ireland in July 1955.

== Managerial career ==
Tadman joined Distillery as player-manager in July 1955. He would continue playing for another two years before retiring in order to concentrate on management. He won the Ulster Cup with the club in 1958 before leaving later that year in December.

== Honours ==
Football League Third Division South

- Winner (1): 1951–52

Ulster Cup

- Winner (1): 1957–58
