= 1908–09 Plymouth Argyle F.C. season =

English football club season

Plymouth Argyle
1908–09 season
- President: Clarence Spooner
- Manager: None (committee)
- Southern League: 10th
- Western League: 3rd
- FA Cup: Third Round
Home colours

The 1908–09 season was the sixth competitive season in the history of Plymouth Argyle Football Club.

== Competitions ==
=== Southern League ===
==== Table ====
Pos	Team	Pld	W	D	L	GF	GA	GR	Pts
8	Reading	40	11	18	11	60	57	1.053	40
9	Luton Town	40	17	6	17	59	60	0.983	40
10	Plymouth Argyle	40	15	10	15	46	47	0.979	40
11	Millwall	40	16	6	18	59	61	0.967	38
12	Southend United	40	14	10	16	52	54	0.963	38

Rules for classification: The system of using goal average to separate two teams tied on points was used until the 1976-77 season. The points system: 2 points for a win, 1 point for a draw and 0 points for losing.

=== FA Cup ===
==== Results ====
15 January 1909 First round	Plymouth Argyle	1–1	Tottenham Hotspur	Plymouth, Devon
			Humphreys	Stadium: Home Park; Attendance: 10,200

19 January 1909 First round reply	Tottenham Hotspur	7–1	Plymouth Argyle	Tottenham, London
	Humphreys; Middlemiss; Minter; Steel pen'			Stadium: White Hart Lane; Attendance: 16,500
