= 1909–10 Plymouth Argyle F.C. season =

English football club season

Plymouth Argyle
1909–10 season
- President: Clarence Spooner
- Manager: None (committee)
- Southern League: 11th
- FA Cup: First Round
Home colours

The 1909–10 season was the seventh competitive season in the history of Plymouth Argyle Football Club.
