= Andres Gurrieri =

Argentine footballer (born 1989)

Andrés Gurrieri
Personal information
- Date of birth: 3 July 1989 (age 37)
- Place of birth: Winterthur, Switzerland
- Height: 5 ft 7 in (1.70 m)
- Position: Midfielder

Youth career
- Ternana

Senior career*
Years	Team	Apps	(Gls)
2007–2010	Ternana	6	(0)
2008–2009	→ Colligiana (loan)	16	(2)
2010–2011	Sud América	20	(0)
2011–2012	Burton Albion	13	(0)
2012–2014	Plymouth Argyle	53	(6)
2014–2016	Tristán Suárez		
2016–2017	Sportivo Italiano		
- * Club domestic league appearances and goals

Andrés Gurrieri (born 3 July 1989) is a retired Argentine former professional footballer who played as a midfielder, predominantly on the right wing.

== Career ==
Born in the Swiss city of Winterthur, he holds dual Argentine and Italian citizenship. Gurrieri began his professional career at Italian side Ternana in 2007 after progressing from the youth and reserve teams. He went on to make six appearances for the club over two seasons. He joined Terza Categoria side Colligiana on loan for the 2008–09 season, where he made 16 appearances, scoring two goals. After being released by Ternana in May 2010, Gurrieri returned to his homeland and joined Uruguayan Segunda División side Sud América. He went on to make 20 appearances for Sud América before being released in March 2011.

Whilst in Argentina, Gurrieri featured in the 2010 series of the reality show Football Cracks, under the nickname Gurry, and came 4th out of the 19 contestants.

Gurrieri joined Plymouth Argyle on trial in July 2011, but could not agree a deal due to the club being under administration at the time. He later joined Burton Albion on trial in October 2011, signing a three-month deal. He went on to sign a new contract which kept him at Burton Albion until the end of the 2011–12 season.

He returned to Plymouth Argyle on trial in the summer of 2012 and signed a 12-month contract in August to become the first South American player to represent the club. Gurrieri scored his first goal for the club in a 2–1 Football League Trophy win against Aldershot Town in October, and his first Football League goal in a 3–1 win against Rochdale eleven days later. Gurrieri left Argyle in June 2015 after choosing not to renew his contract with the Devon club.

In late July 2014, Gurrieri signed an 18-month deal with Club Social y Deportivo Tristán Suárez, a regionalised Argentinian 3rd division side.

On 31 August 2016, he joined Sportivo Italiano, later departing the club in 2017.
