= 1905–06 Plymouth Argyle F.C. season =

English football club season

Plymouth Argyle
1905–06 season
- President: Clarence Spooner
- Manager: Bob Jack
- Southern League: 5th
- Western League: 3rd
- FA Cup: Second Round
Home colours

The 1905–06 season was the third competitive season in the history of Plymouth Argyle Football Club.
