= 1904–05 Plymouth Argyle F.C. season =

English football club season

Plymouth Argyle
1904–05 season
- President: Clarence Spooner
- Manager: Frank Brettell
- Southern League: 4th
- Western League: 1st
- FA Cup: Second round
Home colours

The 1904–05 season was the second competitive season in the history of Plymouth Argyle Football Club.

== Southern League ==
=== Results ===
| 3 September 1904 Match 1 | Queens Park Rangers | 2–1 | Plymouth Argyle | Park Royal, London |

| 10 September 1904 Match 2 | Plymouth Argyle | 5–0 | Millwall | Home Park, Plymouth |

| 17 September 1904 Match 3 | Tottenham Hotspur | 2–0 | Plymouth Argyle | White Hart Lane, London |

| 24 September 1904 Match 4 | Plymouth Argyle | 3–0 | Luton Town | Home Park, Plymouth |

| 1 October 1904 Match 5 | Swindon Town | 4–0 | Plymouth Argyle | County Ground, Swindon |

| 8 October 1904 Match 6 | Plymouth Argyle | 3–2 | New Brompton | Home Park, Plymouth |

| 15 October 1904 Match 7 | Wellingborough | 0–5 | Plymouth Argyle | London Road, Wellingborough |

| 22 October 1904 Match 8 | Plymouth Argyle | 1–0 | Southampton | Home Park, Plymouth |

| 29 October 1904 Match 9 | Fulham | 0–0 | Plymouth Argyle | Craven Cottage, London |

| 5 November 1904 Match 10 | Plymouth Argyle | 0–0 | Watford | Home Park, Plymouth |

| 19 November 1904 Match 11 | West Ham United | 2–1 | Plymouth Argyle | Boleyn Ground, London |

| 26 November 1904 Match 12 | Reading | 2–0 | Plymouth Argyle | Elm Park, Reading |

| 3 December 1904 Match 13 | Bristol Rovers | 4–0 | Plymouth Argyle | Eastville Stadium, Bristol |

| 10 December 1904 Match 14 | Plymouth Argyle | 2–2 | Northampton Town | Home Park, Plymouth |

| 17 December 1904 Match 15 | Portsmouth | 3–2 | Plymouth Argyle | Fratton Park, Portsmouth |

| 24 December 1904 Match 16 | Plymouth Argyle | 1–0 | Brentford | Home Park, Plymouth |

| 31 December 1904 Match 17 | Plymouth Argyle | 3–1 | Queens Park Rangers | Home Park, Plymouth |

| 7 January 1905 Match 18 | Millwall | 2–1 | Plymouth Argyle | Millwall, London |

| 21 January 1905 Match 19 | Luton Town | 0–2 | Plymouth Argyle | Dunstable Road, Luton |

| 28 January 1905 Match 20 | Plymouth Argyle | 3–0 | Swindon Town | Home Park, Plymouth |

| 11 February 1905 Match 21 | Plymouth Argyle | 3–1 | Wellingborough | Home Park, Plymouth |

| 18 February 1905 Match 22 | Watford | 3–1 | Plymouth Argyle | Cassio Road, Watford |

| 25 February 1905 Match 23 | Plymouth Argyle | 1–1 | Fulham | Home Park, Plymouth |

| 11 March 1905 Match 24 | Brighton & Hove Albion | 2–0 | Plymouth Argyle | Goldstone Ground, Brighton |

| 18 March 1905 Match 25 | Plymouth Argyle | 2–0 | West Ham United | Home Park, Plymouth |

| 25 March 1905 Match 26 | Plymouth Argyle | 1–0 | Reading | Home Park, Plymouth |

| 27 March 1905 Match 27 | New Brompton | 1–1 | Plymouth Argyle | Priestfield, Gillingham |

| 1 April 1905 Match 28 | Plymouth Argyle | 3–1 | Bristol Rovers | Home Park, Plymouth |

| 5 April 1905 Match 29 | Plymouth Argyle | 2–1 | Tottenham Hotspur | Home Park, Plymouth |

| 8 April 1905 Match 30 | Northampton Town | 0–2 | Plymouth Argyle | County Ground, Northampton |

| 10 April 1905 Match 31 | Southampton | 0–3 | Plymouth Argyle | The Dell, Southampton |

| 15 April 1905 Match 32 | Plymouth Argyle | 2–1 | Portsmouth | Home Park, Plymouth |

| 21 April 1905 Match 33 | Plymouth Argyle | 3–1 | Brighton & Hove Albion | Home Park, Plymouth |

| 22 April 1905 Match 34 | Brentford | 1–0 | Plymouth Argyle | Griffin Park, London |

=== Standings ===
| Pos | Club | Pld | W | D | L | GF | GA | AV | Pts |
|---|---|---|---|---|---|---|---|---|---|
| 2 | Reading | 34 | 18 | 7 | 9 | 57 | 38 | 1.50 | 43 |
| 3 | Southampton | 34 | 18 | 7 | 9 | 54 | 40 | 1.35 | 43 |
| 4 | Plymouth Argyle | 34 | 18 | 5 | 11 | 57 | 39 | 1.46 | 41 |
| 5 | Tottenham Hotspur | 34 | 15 | 8 | 11 | 53 | 34 | 1.55 | 38 |
| 6 | Fulham | 34 | 14 | 10 | 10 | 46 | 34 | 1.35 | 38 |

== Western League ==
=== Results ===
| 1 September 1904 Match 1 | Brentford | 1–1 | Plymouth Argyle | Griffin Park, London |

| 5 September 1904 Match 2 | Millwall | 1–1 | Plymouth Argyle | Millwall, London |

| 14 September 1904 Match 3 | Plymouth Argyle | 6–1 | Brentford | Home Park, Plymouth |

| 19 September 1904 Match 4 | Southampton | 1–2 | Plymouth Argyle | The Dell, Southampton |

| 28 September 1904 Match 5 | Plymouth Argyle | 4–1 | Southampton | Home Park, Plymouth |

| 5 October 1904 Match 6 | Portsmouth | 2–1 | Plymouth Argyle | Fratton Park, Portsmouth |

| 12 October 1904 Match 7 | Plymouth Argyle | 3–0 | Queens Park Rangers | Home Park, Plymouth |

| 19 October 1904 Match 8 | Plymouth Argyle | 5–0 | Tottenham Hotspur | Home Park, Plymouth |

| 26 October 1904 Match 9 | Plymouth Argyle | 3–1 | Portsmouth | Home Park, Plymouth |

| 31 October 1904 Match 10 | Queens Park Rangers | 2–4 | Plymouth Argyle | Park Royal, London |

| 9 November 1904 Match 11 | Plymouth Argyle | 2–2 | West Ham United | Home Park, Plymouth |

| 21 November 1904 Match 12 | Tottenham Hotspur | 2–0 | Plymouth Argyle | White Hart Lane, London |

| 30 November 1904 Match 13 | Plymouth Argyle | 1–0 | Millwall | Home Park, Plymouth |

| 26 December 1904 Match 14 | Plymouth Argyle | 4–0 | Reading | Home Park, Plymouth |

| 6 March 1905 Match 15 | West Ham United | 1–1 | Plymouth Argyle | Boleyn Ground, London |

| 13 March 1905 Match 16 | Fulham | 0–4 | Plymouth Argyle | Craven Cottage, London |

| 22 March 1905 Match 17 | Plymouth Argyle | 5–1 | Bristol Rovers | Home Park, Plymouth |

| 24 March 1905 Match 18 | Reading | 0–3 | Plymouth Argyle | Elm Park, Reading |

| 29 March 1905 Match 19 | Plymouth Argyle | 0–1 | Fulham | Home Park, Plymouth |

| 17 April 1905 Match 20 | Bristol Rovers | 1–2 | Plymouth Argyle | Eastville Stadium, Bristol |

=== Standings ===
| Pos | Club | Pld | W | D | L | GF | GA | AV | Pts |
|---|---|---|---|---|---|---|---|---|---|
| 1 | Plymouth Argyle | 20 | 13 | 4 | 3 | 52 | 18 | 2.88 | 30 |
| 2 | Brentford | 20 | 11 | 6 | 3 | 30 | 22 | 1.36 | 28 |
| 3 | Southampton | 20 | 11 | 2 | 7 | 45 | 22 | 2.04 | 24 |
| 4 | Portsmouth | 20 | 10 | 3 | 7 | 29 | 30 | 0.96 | 23 |
| 5 | West Ham United | 20 | 8 | 4 | 8 | 37 | 42 | 0.88 | 20 |

== FA Cup ==
=== Results ===
| 14 January 1905 Intermediate | Plymouth Argyle | 2–0 | Barnsley | Home Park, Plymouth |
| | McLuckie; Buck | | | Attendance: 10,515 |

| 4 February 1905 First round | Newcastle United | 1–1 | Plymouth Argyle | St James' Park, Newcastle |
| | | | Dalrymple | Attendance: 28,000 |

| 8 February 1905 First round | Plymouth Argyle | 1–1 | Newcastle United | Home Park, Plymouth |
| | McLuckie | | | Attendance: 17,641 |

| 13 February 1905 First round | Plymouth Argyle | 0–2 | Newcastle United | Manor Ground, London |
| | | | | Attendance: 16,000 |
