= Flipside =

Flipside or flip side may refer to:

- The B-side of a gramophone record's A-side and B-side

== Print ==
- Flipside (fanzine), a punk rock fanzine and record publisher active 1977–2001
- Flipside (comics), a villain in Marvel Comics
- "The Flip Side", a section of The Columbus Dispatch newspaper
- "FlipSide", a teen section of the Charleston Gazette newspaper
- Flipside, a teen magazine from the Institution of Engineering and Technology
- The Flipside, a satirical school newspaper from Deerfield High School (Illinois)

== Music ==
=== Songs ===
- "Flipside" (The Click Five song), a song by The Click Five from their 2007 album Modern Minds and Pastimes
- "Flipside", a song by Everything but the Girl from their 1996 album Walking Wounded
- "Flipside", a song by rapper Freeway from his 2003 album Philadelphia Freeway and Bad Boys II (soundtrack)
- "Flipside", a 2014 song by Lana Del Rey
- "The Flipside", a song by Moloko from their album I Am Not a Doctor

=== Other ===
- Flipside, a music video program of MTV Asia and IBC-13
- DJ Flipside, a radio host on Chicago station WBBM-FM
- Flipside (album), a 2005 album by jazz musician Jeff Lorber

== Other uses ==
- BFI Flipside, a series of DVD and Blu-ray film editions
- Burning Flipside, a Texas arts festival descended from Burning Man
- Flipside (video game), a platform computer game mod developed upon the Source engine
- Flipside (Canadian TV program), a 1974 Canadian journalistic music television program
- Flipside (Australian TV series), a 2002 Australian television comedy series
- Flipside TV, a series broadcast by Channel 4, Nation 277, and Paramount in the United Kingdom
- A town in the video game Super Paper Mario
- Flipside film festival, a 2008 international film festival held in Plymouth, UK
- Hoffman Estates v. The Flipside, Hoffman Estates, Inc., a case heard by the U.S. Supreme Court and sometimes referred to as "Flipside"
- Flipside, a webcomic by Brion Foulke

== See also ==
- Flipsyde
- fripSide
- Opposite (disambiguation)
- Reverse (disambiguation)
- The Other Side (disambiguation)
