= The Other Side =

The Other Side, Other Side, or Otherside may refer to:

== Film, television and radio ==
=== Films ===
- The Other Side (1931 film), a German film directed by Heinz Paul
- The Other Side, a 1990 Indian film also known as Marupuram
- The Other Side, a 1999 film by director Peter Flinth
- The Other Side (2000 film), a Spanish drama
- The Other Side (2006 film), an action-horror film directed by Gregg Bishop
- The Other Side, a 2010 short film starring Abigail Mavity
- The Other Side (2012 film), a short film directed by Muhammad Danish Qasim
- The Other Side (2015 film), a French-Italian documentary on Louisiana, U.S.
- Ferocious Planet or The Other Side, a 2011 science fiction TV movie
- Falsafa: The Other Side, a 2019 Indian film
- Poltergeist II: The Other Side, a 1986 horror film

=== Television and radio series ===
- The Other Side with Steve Godfrey, an American radio show
- The Other Side, a 1992 UK one-off TV drama written by David Ashton
- The Other Side, a 1994-95 American show on the NBC Daytime schedule

=== Television episodes ===
- "The Other Side" (Grimm)
- "The Other Side" (The Handmaid's Tale)
- "The Other Side" (Hercules: The Legendary Journeys)
- "The Other Side" (The Outer Limits)
- "The Other Side" (Stargate SG-1)
- "The Other Side" (The Walking Dead)

== Literature ==
- The Other Side (comics), a Vertigo comic by Jason Aaron and Cameron Stewart
- The Other Side (Kubin novel) (Die andere Seite), a 1909 fantastic novel by Alfred Kubin
- The Other Side (Kazi and Banerjee novel), a 2013 novel by Faraaz Kazi and Vivek Banerjee
- The Other Side (play) or The Other Shore, a 1990 play by Gao Xingjian
- The Other Side (Pike book), a 1968 occult book by Bishop James Pike
- The Other Side (Woodson book), a 2001 children's book by Jacqueline Woodson
- The Other Side: The Secret Relationship Between Nazism and Zionism, a 1984 book by Mahmoud Abbas
- The Other Side (El Otro Lado), a 1995 poetry collection by Julia Álvarez

== Music ==
=== Albums ===
- The Other Side (1927 album), 1990
- The Other Side (Alastis album), 1996
- The Other Side (Billy Ray Cyrus album), 2003
- The Otherside (album) by Cam, 2020
- The Other Side (Charlie Major album), 1993
- The Other Side (Chris Hillman album), 2005
- The Other Side (Chuck Brown and Eva Cassidy album), 1992
- The Other Side (Farmer Boys album), 2004
- The Other Side (Gary Jenkins album), 2007
- The Other Side (Gothminister album), 2017
- The Other Side (Lucy Diakovska album), 2005
- The Other Side (Lynden David Hall album), 2000
- The Other Side (Mark Tuan album), 2022
- Otherside (Oliver Lake album), 1988
- The Other Side (The Outhere Brothers album), 1998
- The Other Side (Sarah Geronimo album), 2005
- The Other Side (T Bone Burnett album), 2024
- The Other Side (Tonight Alive album), 2013
- The Other Side (Tord Gustavsen album), 2018
- The Other Side (Wynonna Judd album), 1997
- The Other Side, by Martha Byrne, 2006
- The Other Side - The Best of Dexter Freebish, by Dexter Freebish, 2009
- The Other Side, by Nektar, 2020

=== EPs ===
- The Other Side (Godsmack EP), 2004
- The Other Side (Kate Voegele EP), 2003
- The Other Side (Nina Sky EP), 2010

=== Songs ===
- "The Other Side" (Aerosmith song), 1989
- "The Other Side" (Charlie Major song), 1994
- "The Other Side" (David Gray song), 2002
- "The Other Side" (Jason Derulo song), 2013
- "The Other Side" (Paul van Dyk song), 2005
- "The Other Side" (Pendulum song), 2008
- "The Other Side" (SZA and Justin Timberlake song), 2020
- "Otherside", by the Red Hot Chili Peppers, 2000
- "The Other Side", by Afro Celt Sound System from Seed, 2003
- "The Other Side", by Alana Grace from Break the Silence, 2007
- "The Other Side", by Aleksander Denstad With, 2006
- "The Other Side", by All Time Low from Tell Me I'm Alive, 2023
- "The Other Side", by Alter Bridge from The Last Hero, 2016
- "The Other Side", by Annihilator from Annihilator, 2010
- "The Other Side" by Au5 and Chime, 2023
- "Otherside", by Beyoncé from The Lion King: The Gift, 2019
- "Other Side", by Blink-182 from One More Time..., 2023
- "The Otherside", by Breaks Co-Op from The Sound Inside, 2005
- "The Other Side", by Bruno Mars from It's Better If You Don't Understand, 2010
- "The Otherside", by Bubba Sparxxx from The Charm, 2006
- "The Other Side", by Clannad from Banba, 1994
- "The Other Side", by Colton Dixon, 2017
- "The Other Side", by Conan Gray, 2016/2019
- "The Other Side", by the Dismemberment Plan from Change, 2001
- "The Other Side", by Evanescence from Evanescence, 2011
- "The Other Side", by Fey from Vértigo, 2002
- "The Other Side", by From First to Last from From First to Last, 2008
- "Other Side", by (hed)p.e. from Blackout, 2003
- "The Other Side", by Hugh Jackman and Zac Efron from The Greatest Showman: Original Motion Picture Soundtrack, 2017
- "The Other Side", by James Marriott from Are We There Yet?, 2023
- "The Other Side", by Jay Rock from Redemption, 2018
- "The Other Side", by Lauren Alaina, 2019
- "Otherside", by Lena Raine from Minecraft: Caves & Cliffs, 2021
- "Otherside", by Macklemore & Ryan Lewis, 2009
- "The Other Side", by Matt Brouwer from Where's Our Revolution, 2009
- "The Other Side", by Memphis May Fire from Shapeshifter, 2025
- "The Other Side", by Mike Oldfield from Music of the Spheres, 2008
- "The Other Side", by Nebula from Heavy Psych, 2009
- "Other Side", by Pearl Jam, a B-side from the single "Save You", 2003
- "Otherside", by Perfume Genius from No Shape, 2017
- "The Other Side", by Public Service Broadcasting from The Race for Space, 2015
- "Other Side", by Rancid from Indestructible, 2003
- "The Otherside", by Red Sun Rising from Polyester Zeal, 2015
- "The Other Side", by Richard Marx from My Own Best Enemy, 2004
- "The OtherSide", by the Roots from Undun, 2011
- "Other Side", by the Scissor Sisters from Ta-Dah, 2006
- "The Other Side", by Sirenia from Nine Destinies and a Downfall, 2007
- "The Other Side", by Sloan from Parallel Play, 2008
- "The Other Side", by Stephen Sanchez from Angel Face (Club Deluxe), 2023
- "The Other Side", by Tiny Tim from God Bless Tiny Tim, 1968
- "The Other Side", by Toto from Kingdom of Desire, 1992
- "The Other Side", by Whitechapel from The Valley, 2019
- "Other Side", by Zachariah Selwyn

=== Performers ===
- The Other Side, a 1960s American band featuring Boz Scaggs and Mac MacLeod

== Religion ==
- Qlippoth, also known as the Other Side, are representations of evil in Jewish mysticism

== See also ==
- The Othersiders, a 2009 American paranormal reality TV series
- On the Other Side (disambiguation)
- Die andere Seite (disambiguation)
- Flipside (disambiguation)
