= DR1 (disambiguation) =

DR1 is the flagship television channel of the Danish Broadcasting Corporation.

DR1 may also refer to:

- DR1 (gene), a gene coding for the Dr1 protein
- DR1 (star), an extremely rare WO-class star in the galaxy IC 1613
- DR1 diesel train
- DR1 register, a debugging register in the x86 computer architecture
- Gaia DR1, the first data release from the Gaia spacecraft mission
- Rotor DR1, a 2015 science-fiction movie
- Riich M1, a car marketed as the DR1 in Italy
- Danganronpa: Trigger Happy Havoc, a 2010 video game serving as the first installment of the Danganronpa series

== See also ==
- Dr.I (disambiguation)
