= Culture of Plymouth =

Social aspects of Plymouth, England

The culture of Plymouth is a social aspect of the unitary authority and city of Plymouth that is located in the south-west of England. Built in 1815, Union Street was at the heart of Plymouth's historical culture. It became known as the servicemen's playground, as it was where sailors from the Royal Navy would seek entertainment. During the 1930s, there were 30 pubs and it attracted such performers as Charlie Chaplin to the New Palace Theatre. It is now the late-night hub of Plymouth's entertainment strip, but has a reputation for trouble at closing hours.

Outdoor events and festivals are held including the annual British Firework Championships in August, which attracts tens of thousands of people across the waterfront. In August 2006 the world record for the most simultaneous fireworks was surpassed, by Roy Lowry of the University of Plymouth, over Plymouth Sound. Since 1992 the Music of the Night has been performed in the Royal Citadel by the 29 Commando Regiment and local performers to raise money for local and military charities.

In 2009 Plymouth Culture, an arts and cultural development agency, was set up to provide strategic direction for cultural development across the city.

The city is recognised by Arts Council England with a number National Portfolio Organisations, each of whom received annual funding to support the delivery of cultural activity across the city - for the 2018–22 funded period, the organisations funded were:

- The Box, Plymouth
- Barbican Theatre, Plymouth
- KARST
- Literature Works
- Plymouth Culture
- Plymouth Music Zone
- Real Ideas Organisation
- Take A Part CIC
- Theatre Royal Plymouth

== Radio and television ==
Plymouth is the sub-regional television centre of BBC South West. Plymouth is the regional television centre of BBC South West. A team of journalists are headquartered at Plymouth for the ITV West Country regional station, after a merger with ITV West forced ITV Westcountry to close on 16 February 2009. The main local newspapers serving Plymouth are The Herald and Western Morning News with BBC Radio Devon and Heart West being the main local radio stations.

== Theatre ==
Plymouth is home to a number of theatres and performance spaces used for professional, community and amateur work; the main professional spaces are located in and around the city centre, offering a variety of performances all year round. Theatre Royal Plymouth is a regional producing theatre which incorporates three stages - The Lyric (1315 seats), The Drum (c.200 seats) and The Lab (c.50 seats). Its production and education centre, TR2, is in an award-winning building at Cattedown. The Barbican Theatre is in a converted Mission which hosts a programme of live dance, theatre, music and comedy. University of Plymouth is home to The House - a state-of-the-art performance venue with 200 seats - and can also host performances in two lecture theatres within the Roland Levinsky Building. The Plymouth Athenaeum has a 332 seat theatre on its grounds, which returned to public use in 2016 after a period of inactivity.

Outside of the city centre, venues include the Devonport Playhouse (used primarily by community and amateur groups), the Soapbox Children's Theatre (presenting shows for children and young audiences) and Marjon Arts Centre (based at Plymouth Marjon University). There are also two Grade II listed theatres currently out of use, and included on the Theatres Trust Theatres at Risk Register - the Palace Theatre on Union Street, and the Globe Theatre within Stonehouse Barracks.

Theatrical performances periodically happen across the city in public and established spaces, such as the world premiere of The Hatchling - featuring a large dragon puppet awakening in the city before taking flight from Plymouth Hoe - and the annual Plymouth Fringe Festival.

== Cinema and concerts ==
There are currently two multi-screen chain cinemas located in Plymouth - Vue cinema at the Barbican Leisure Park, and Cineworld at The Barcode, Drake Circus - alongside a small number of independent venues. Plymouth Arts Cinema (formerly known as Plymouth Arts Centre) specializes in art house and foreign films, and is based at Plymouth College of Art; at University of Plymouth, the Jill Craigie Cinema hosts a curated programmed of historic pieces, world cinema and talks on specific films. The city is also host to an annual underground film festival, the Flipside film festival.

The Plymouth Pavilions stages music concerts from rock and pop to ballet, as well as hosting basketball, wrestling and line dancing.

== Museums, art galleries and historic buildings ==
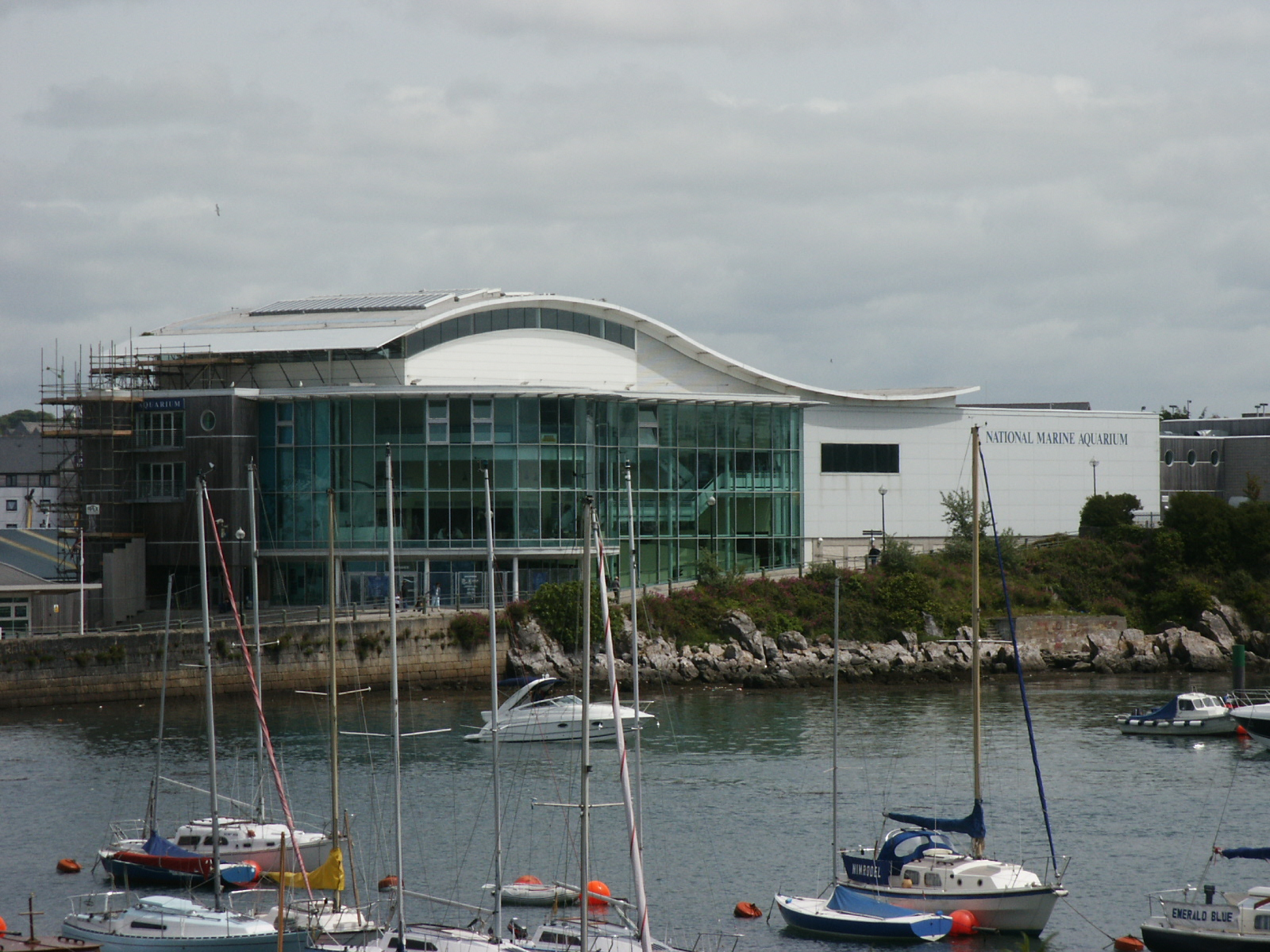
The National Marine Aquarium is located in Plymouth.

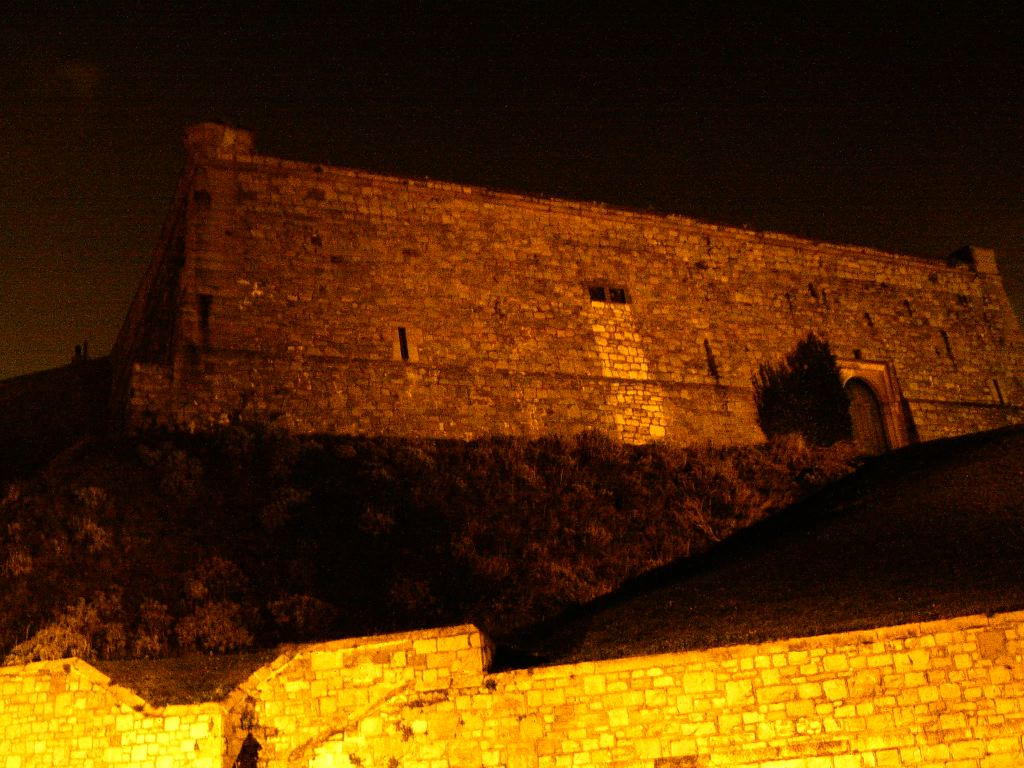
The Royal Citadel at night.

The Box opened in 2020, replacing the Plymouth City Museum and Art Gallery on Drake Circus. It hosts a variety of exhibitions and collections of fine and decorative arts, natural history and human history.

The Arts Institute (formerly Peninsula Arts) is the curated public arts programme of University of Plymouth, with a gallery located on the university campus; their public arts programme includes exhibitions, installations, performances, films and talks available to both students and the general public.

KARST is South West England's largest independent artist-led contemporary arts gallery and studio space, based in the Stonehouse area of Plymouth.

Ocean Studios, based in the Royal William Yard, opened in 2015 as an independent gallery and co-working space. It is currently operated by Real Ideas, who also operate the Market Hall in Devonport - which is home to a 15m immersive dome, the first of its kind in Europe.

There are also smaller and privately owned retail galleries in the Barbican, such as Kaya Gallery.

Also in Plymouth are the Plymouth and West Devon Record Office, Smeaton's Tower, the Elizabethan House, and Merchants House in The Barbican. Plymouth is home to the National Marine Aquarium. The Plymouth Synagogue, in Catherine Street, was built in 1762.

Plymouth Naval Base Museum is a maritime museum under development at HMNB Devonport.

== Nightlife ==
Union Street has been the centre of Plymouth's nightlife for over a century. Previously lined with music halls and cinemas, the street is now run down but is still home to a number of bars, clubs and casinos. Although most clubs play commercial dance and R&B, there are some which play less popular genres. Other clubs and bars are at the Barbican Leisure Park and on Lockyer Street. There are a number of bars with live music. Mutley Plain and North Hill have many student bars.

The Lockyer Tavern; oral history

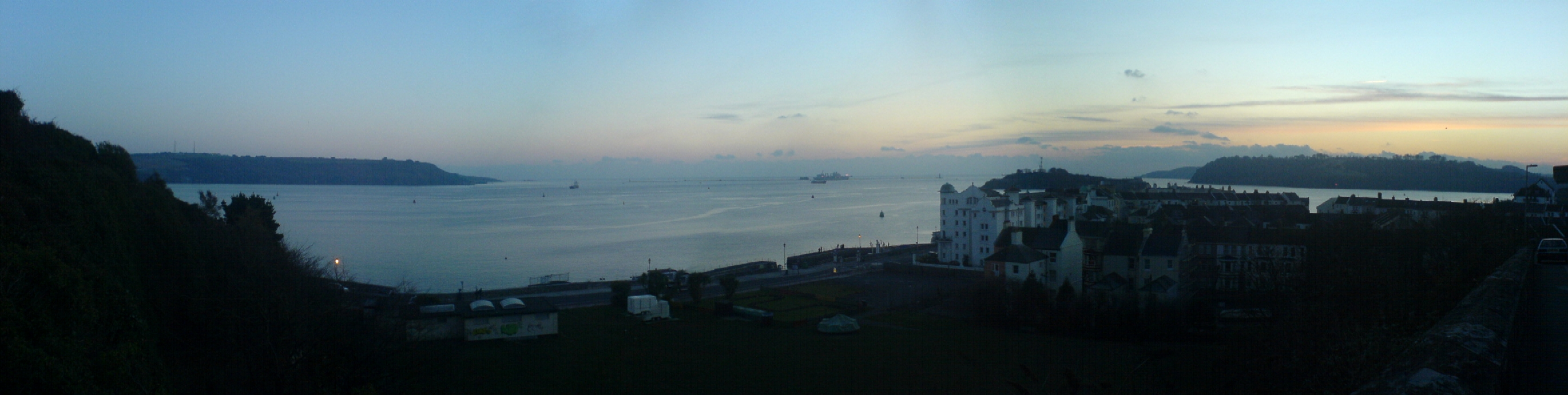
Looking towards the sea, from Cliff Road near the Hoe

== Media ==
Plymouth is a sub-regional television centre of BBC South West. A team of journalists are headquartered at Plymouth for the ITV West Country regional station, after a merger with ITV West forced ITV Westcountry to close on 16 February 2009.

The regional stations include BBC Radio Devon, BBC Radio Cornwall, Heart West and Pirate FM.

The main regional newspaper is the Western Morning News, whose local publishing and print centre at Derriford were designed by architect Nicholas Grimshaw. The local city paper, from the same publisher, Northcliffe Media group, at the same print centre, is the Plymouth Herald.

Hospital Radio Plymouth is a station dedicated to the city's patients, broadcasting to Derriford Hospital, The Royal Eye Infirmary and on 87.7fm.

== See also ==
- Sport in Plymouth
- Culture of Devon
- Culture of the United Kingdom
- Media in Cornwall
