= John Fitchett =

John Fitchett may refer to:

- John Fitchett (poet) (1776–1838), English poet
- Jack Fitchett (1880–?), English footballer
