= Steve Moses (disambiguation) =

Steve Moses (born 1989) is an American ice hockey player.

Steve or Stephen Moses may also refer to:

- Stephen Moses (born 1954), American musician
- Steve Moses (born 1992), winner of Big Brother 17
- Steve Moses (born 1982), writer/actor in Rotor DR1
