= Nor Kiddie =

British actor (1897–?)

Norman Chilton Kiddie, known as Nor Kiddie, was a British comedian, actor and juggler of the 1920s and 1930s.

== Life and career ==
Kiddie was born to Elizabeth (Chilton) and Joseph Garibaldi Kiddie in Widnes, Lancashire, in 1897.

His father, Joseph (or "J. Gar"; 1864-1943) was a locally successful music hall artiste, writer, comedian, pantomime producer and promoter in the early years of the century. He had his own comic sketch company by 1907 when J. Gar Kiddie & Co. appeared at the Grand Theatre, Hanley with their "funny absurdity", 'The House of Tinn', which starred Kiddie himself. Another early triumph was his version of the "Little Bo-Peep" pantomime - featuring Walter Wade as the Baron - that he created and promoted. In 1904, he had taken his "merry burlesque", 'A Little Coquette' to the New Gaiety Theatre at Leith. This play would later be filmed under the same title in 1909.

By the start of World War I, J. Gar was the impresario of the local Alexandra Theatre at Widnes and had become associated with Bert Harding, who was a musician and conductor at that place before being called up for service. Throughout the early days of the war, Harding continued to write songs and tunes, including one with his old friend Gar. By 1915, the work, an Irish musical play, was finished and had been provisionally entitled Sheila. Both Harding (a gunner with 115th Heavy Battery) and Kiddie were awaiting the end of the war in order to produce and tour the play. Sadly, Harding was seriously wounded by shell fragments on 15 October 1917 and died the next day. As far as can be ascertained, the play was never produced.

After the war, when Norman came of age, he joined his father’s act, the two of them being billed as, "Nor and Gar Kiddie". The two worked hard at polishing their act and were rewarded when, in the summer of 1923, they headlined in the play, "O.K." (billed as "a Magical Musical Comedy - you will laugh 'til you cry"), which toured the country. The next year, Nor appeared solo in J. A. Tunbridge's, The Globe Trot. This play featured the songs "I Shall Always Follow You", "I Must Have Some Novelette Love", "Send Her a Little Pansy", "Hawaiian Moon Maid", and "Hassan".

In the winter season of 1924-25, Nor appeared at the Prince's Theatre, Bradford in their pantomime of Robinson Crusoe alongside Cissie Sullivan, Dorothy Viggers, Marian Dawson and Naughton & Gold. After this spate of performances, there's a gap in Nor's career until he begins to appear in films in the early 1930s, such as Fred Karno's 1932 film "The Bad Companions" where Nor appeared as Pip, the lead role. A couple of years followed before his second film, January 1936's rather more professionally produced, "(Mother) Don't Rush Me", in which he appeared as the smaller part of the Commissionaire. Again, this was another film that Fred Karno produced, but the direction was by the more renowned playwright, Norman Lee.

Nor appeared at the New Palace Theatre, Plymouth for a week starting on 20 January 1941 in 'Bonjour Paris' with the Two Brilliants; Billy Gold; the Bal Tabarin Girls; Costelo; the Bon Jour Damsels; Vera Walden; Freddie Cleef & Johnny Moroney.

Nor's father, Gar, died in 1943, aged 79, and was buried in his hometown of Widnes. Nor continued with his career however such as 1946's pantomime season as the fourth billed Baron Taykall of Con West's adaption "Red Riding Hood". West was the writer of both of Kiddie's films (along with Fred Karno) that are mentioned above. During the 1950s, Nor could still be found performing at Stockport Hippodrome in a Bernard Delfont production.

== Source ==
- Denis Gifford. Entertainers in British Films: A Century of Showbiz in the Cinema, Flicks Books (1998).
