= From the Sky (film) =

- Film poster
- Directed by: Ian Ebright
- Written by: Ian Ebright
- Produced by: Jess Grant; Ian Ebright
- Starring: Maz Siam; Mohamad Tamini; Steven Soro; Georges Chalhoub
- Cinematography: Ty Migota
- Edited by: Eric Frith
- Music by: loscil
- Release dates: April 30, 2014 (Newport Beach Film Festival); October 21, 2014 (Vimeo)
- Running time: 18 minutes
- Language: Arabic
- Budget: US$30,000

From the Sky is a 2014 short film written and directed by Ian Ebright, who also produced it with Jess Grant. The independently produced drama features an Arab father and son traveling through a region that often experiences drone strikes. The film premiered at the Newport Beach Film Festival on April 30, 2014 and was released on the video-sharing website Vimeo on October 21, 2014.

== Premise ==
Hakeem and his son Abbas travel through a region that often experiences drone strikes. Abbas has posttraumatic stress disorder and struggles to keep it under control with the threat of drones. Two men, Dhiya and Samir, visit their camp, and trouble arises.

== Cast ==
- Maz Siam ... Hakeem
- Mohamad Tamini ... Abbas
- Steven Soro ... Dhiya
- Georges Chalhoub ... Samir

== Production ==
From the Sky was written, produced, and directed by Ian Ebright, who studied at the Seattle Film Institute and followed news coverage about drone strikes in Asia and the Middle East. He collaborated with Muslims and American advisers on the Middle East and developed an Arabic-language screenplay for the film's production. He used Kickstarter to raise two-thirds of what would be a final budget of $30,000.

== Release ==
From the Sky premiered at the Newport Beach Film Festival on April 30, 2014. It also screened at the Seattle International Film Festival on May 25, 2014. The film was nominated for four awards at the Short Film Awards. The film was released online through the video-sharing website Vimeo on October 21, 2014.

== See also ==
- List of films featuring drones
