= List of films featuring drones =

There is a body of films featuring unmanned aerial vehicles colloquially known as drones. The Hollywood Reporter wrote in February 2016, "There has been no shortage of films dealing with drones over the last few years... audiences have recently had the occasion to explore a form of modern warfare whose true repercussions are yet to be fully understood, let alone divulged to the general public." The Wall Street Journal's Caryn James said of drone technology, "Movies and television shows increasingly grapple with those unprecedented aspects of war," highlighting Good Kill's release in 2015. James said, "These new films and shows have to keep the action going in situation rooms full of computers, rather than in trenches and on battlefields. And they address moral and strategic questions that old-fashioned World War II movies never had to."

Henry Barnes wrote in The Guardian in April 2016, "In real life, drone warfare has prompted protests, legal action and revolt. Until now, films about drones haven't properly engaged in the debate. They either forget there's someone at the controls, emphasising the alien nature of a remote, robotic death, or, like London Has Fallen, use drones as just another weapon in the arsenal; a cool tool to make bigger, badder bangs." Barnes highlighted Eye in the Sky (2015) as an example of "one of the first drone movies to work in the grey areas" of drone warfare. Jason Bourque wrote in The New York Times of Good Kill and Eye in the Sky, "Those films examined the moral struggles of military personnel as they conduct missions with clinical precision while far removed from danger."

== List of films ==
Film	Year	Description
American Ultra	2015	The stoner comedy film features an exaggerated Central Intelligence Agency that carries out drone strikes on American shopping malls.
Angel Has Fallen	2019	The action film features drones attacking the President of the United States in an opening scene.
Babylon A.D.	2008	In the science fiction film, the protagonists are attacked by aerial drones, patrolling the Alaskan-Canadian border.
Back to the Future Part II	1989	In the science fiction film, a future timeline depicts a news outlet drone videotaping the arrest of a criminal.
Blade Runner 2049	2017	In the science fiction film, LAPD officer K has a flying car equipped with a detachable drone that he can control via voice command. The drone is able to survey areas, including what is underground.
Blair Witch	2016	In the horror film, the main characters bring a drone-mounted camera into the woods with them.
Body of Lies	2008	The spy film features extensive use of drone surveillance.
The Bourne Legacy	2012	Aaron Cross, an agent of a Central Intelligence Agency program living in the woods, is targeted in a U.S. drone strike.
Captain America: The Winter Soldier	2014	In the superhero film, a government program called Project Insight creates three Helicarriers that have the capability of killing autonomously.
Captain Phillips	2013	In the thriller film based on a true story, a Boeing Insitu ScanEagle is used by the United States Navy to monitor the situation involving a hijacked ship.
The Chamber	2016	In the survival film, a four-person submersible crew attempts to find and destroy a crashed RQ-170 surveillance drone lost in the Yellow Sea before North Korea can recover it.
Chappie	2015	In the science fiction film, a villain deploys drones to track down and attack the protagonist.
Defense Play	1988	The movie centres around a top secret project for the US Air Force called DART: a very small helicopter for scouting and defense.
Dirty Wars	2013	The documentary investigates targeted killings carried out by the United States government, including those executed by drones.
The Divergent Series: Allegiant	2016	The dystopian film features miniature drones that obey finger commands.
Drone	2014	The documentary explores the use of drones in warfare.
Drone	2017	In the thriller film, an American drone pilot is confronted by a Pakistani businessman seeking revenge.
The Drone	2019	The horror film features a serial killer whose consciousness is uploaded to a consumer drone, and the killer terrorizes a pair of newlyweds as the drone.
Drones	2013	Two United States Air Force personnel wrestle with executing a drone strike on an apparent terrorist at the cost of civilian lives.
Eagle Eye	2008	In the thriller film, a Predator drone is flown into a Washington, DC tunnel to kill the film's protagonist.
Elysium	2013	In the science fiction film, a sleeper agent deploys drones to track down and attack the protagonist.
Eye in the Sky	2015	The film features drones operated by the U.S. and British governments that fire Hellfire missiles and insect-/bird-sized drones that infiltrate terrorist compounds.
Force Majeure	2014	In the Swedish film, a family of four on a ski trip bring with them a toy drone. In a dramatic scene, the drone's appearance invokes a comical feeling to break the heavy social pressure of the scene.
Four Lions	2010	In the black comedy film, a terrorist at a suicide bomber training camp attempts to shoot down a drone with a rocket launcher but has it backwards and instead kills his fellow terrorists.
From the Sky	2014	In the short film, an Arab father and son travel through a region frequently targeted in drone strikes.
Full Contact	2015	A French drone pilot flies drones in the Middle East from Nevada in the United States. He carries out a drone strike on a building to kill a terrorist inside, but he discovers afterward that the building was a school for boys.
Furious 7	2015	In the film's climax, the protagonists drive through the streets of Los Angeles to evade a weaponized drone.
The Giver	2014	In the dystopian film, drones monitor citizens and inform them of rule-breaking.
Good Kill	2014	A United States Air Force pilot, participating in the Central Intelligence Agency's drone program in the war in Afghanistan, struggles with the ethics of attacking targets from afar.
Hummingbird	2013	A former Special Forces officer, struggling for redemption, is paranoid about having been watched by drones ("hummingbirds") in his Afghanistan operations as well as his life on the streets in London.
Inferno	2016	In a scene from the thriller film, a symbology professor and his sidekick evade a drone hunting them in Florence's Boboli Gardens.
Leave the World Behind	2023	In the post-apocalyptic thriller film, one of the characters encounters on the road a drone dropping leaflets with Arabic writing, thematically tied to one of the film's notions of "sowing 'synchronized chaos' with misinformation".
London Fields	2015	The drama film, with a nonlinear narrative, features a military drone as part of intercut scenes.
I.F.O. (Identified Flying Object)	1987	A teenage computer whiz steals a high-tech miniature surveillance helicopter that has a mind of its own, before it is destroyed by its creator.
London Has Fallen	2016	The action film begins with a drone strike targeting a terrorist but only killing his family, leading him to seek revenge.
Interstellar	2014	At the beginning of the science fiction film, the protagonist tracks down and commandeers a renegade drone formerly belonging to the Indian Air Force.
Iron Man 2	2010	During the superhero film, the villain Justin Hammer builds weaponized humanoid drones based on Iron Man's suit technology.
The Interview	2014	In the comedy film, a drone delivers a replacement strip of poison to Kim Jong-un's fortress for the protagonists to use to kill him.
Kill Command	2016	The science fiction film features artificial intelligence-controlled drones who attack a team of soldiers on a military training island.
Mission: Impossible III	2006	In the spy film, a convoy traveling across the Chesapeake Bay Bridge is targeted by a drone.
Mobile Suit Gundam F91	1991	In the sci-fi mecha anime film, the Crossbone Empire uses drones known as Bugs, equipped with whirling blades along their edges, which are designed to saw through whatever they encounter. They can also split open to deploy "Child" Bugs, smaller Action Bombs with a small beam gun that can go into smaller places(like houses).
Mohajer	1990	A man who controls RC airplanes to detect Iraq's front line, is put in danger of not being able to return.
National Bird	2016	In the documentary film, three whistleblowers warn about the consequences of military drone strikes.
Oblivion	2013	In the science fiction film, drones monitor a ruined Earth in 2077.
Olympus Has Fallen	2013	In the action thriller film, North Korean terrorists launched a small drone to be on a lookout for any military incursion teams.
The Other Side	2012	The short film depicts a child who experiences drone attacks in Pakistan by the United States government and consequently joins a terrorist group.
Poltergeist	2015	In the horror film, a toy drone plays a key role in the climax.
The Purge: Election Year	2016	The horror film features drone warfare.
RoboCop	2014	In the science fiction film, the beginning depicts drones used as part of a U.S. military operation to subjugate a Middle Eastern country.
Rocko's Modern Life: Static Cling	2019	In this animated film, characters travel on drone-propelled chairs.
Rotor DR1	2015	In the science fiction film, a young man in a post-apocalyptic world attempts to track down his father, traveling under a sky populated with autonomous drones.
Sentinel	2017	In the science fiction short film, a man wakes up in an empty field and is chased by a flying drone.
Skyline	2010	In the science fiction film, Predator drones are deployed with stealth bombers to fight an aerial battle with enemy aliens.
Slaughterbots	2017	The short film, a collaboration between professor Stuart J. Russell and the Future of Life Institute, depicts a dystopian future in which palm-sized drones are able to carry out massacres with facial-recognition technology and on-board explosives. The film was produced to encourage a global ban on autonomous weapons systems.
The Spymasters	2015	In the documentary film, Directors of the Central Intelligence Agency are interviewed about the agency's approach to terrorism, including the use of drone strikes.
Stealth	2005	In the action film, an unmanned air combat vehicle developed by the United States military is taken over by a built-in artificial intelligence, and three Navy pilots work together to stop the vehicle.
Sleep Dealer	2008	In the science fiction film, the setting is a near-future dystopia where the water supply is privately controlled by corporations and warfare is waged with drones. The inclusion of drones was inspired by the 1997 science fiction novel Forever Peace.
Spider-Man: Far From Home	2019	In the superhero film, Mysterio uses drones masked by holographic images to create cataclysmic threats that he thwarts to make himself appear to be a superhero.
Spider-Man: Homecoming	2017	In the superhero film, Spider-Man utilizes a bug-sized drone provided to him by Iron Man.
Spies in Disguise	2019	In this animated film, agents from H.T.U.V. battle a terrorist who employs hundreds of drones in battle.
Star Trek: Insurrection	1998	In the science fiction film, unmanned remote controlled drones controlled by the Sona locate and target persons on a planet surface and transport them onto a starship above.
Syriana	2005	In the geopolitical thriller, a Predator drone is used by the Central Intelligence Agency to assassinate an emirate's foreign minister.
This Means War	2012	In the romantic comedy film, two Central Intelligence Agency men compete over a woman, and one agent shoots down a surveillance drone that the other agent deployed to spy on him.
Transformers: Age of Extinction	2014	In the action film based on the robot toy line, miniature drones are featured as part of the group of villains.
Unmanned: America's Drone Wars	2013	The documentary film investigates the impact of U.S. drone strikes in Pakistan and elsewhere.
Venom	2018	There is a scene in which several unmanned quadcopters chase down the protagonist.
X-Men: Days of Future Past	2014	In the superhero film, the future timeline features airborne killer robots called Sentinels that hunt down and kill mutants.
