= On the Other Side =

On the Other Side may refer to:

- On the Other Side (film), a 2016 Croatian-Serbian film directed by Zrinko Ogresta
- On the Other Side, a 1983 album by Alan Hull
- On the Other Side, the 2005 version of the album Carry On by Kansas
- "On the Other Side", a 2009 song by Delain from April Rain
- "On the Other Side", a 1979 song by Kansas from Monolith
- "On the Other Side", a 1967 song by the Seekers from Seekers Seen in Green

== See also ==
- The Other Side (disambiguation)
