= Frank Brettell =

English football player

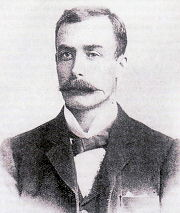

Personal information
- Full name: Francis Edward Brettell
- Date of birth: 1862
- Place of birth: Smethwick, Staffordshire, England
- Date of death: 1936 (aged 73–74)
- Place of death: Dartford, Kent, England
- Position: Full-back

Senior career*
Years	Team	Apps	(Gls)
- St. Domingo's
- Everton

Managerial career
- 1896–1898: Bolton Wanderers
- 1898–1899: Tottenham Hotspur
- 1899–1901: Portsmouth
- 1903–1905: Plymouth Argyle
- * Club domestic league appearances and goals

Frank E. Brettell (1862–1936) was an English football player, manager and administrator.

He played as a full-back for Everton, a club that was originally called St. Domingo's. He combined his role as player-secretary-manager with his full-time job as a reporter for the Liverpool Mercury. He became secretary of Bolton Wanderers in 1896 and remained there for two years before moving to London to join Tottenham Hotspur as their first manager. He then accepted a more lucrative offer to join Portsmouth and guided them to a second-place finish in their first season in the Southern League. He accepted an offer to join Plymouth Argyle in 1903 and helped establish the club in the professional game. The job was to be his last as a manager and he retired from football altogether a year later.

== Football career ==
Brettell began his football career with a local club St. Domingo. He initially played as centre- or inside-forward for the club, and later due to injuries as half-back and even on goal. He combined his playing duties with a role as secretary-manager of the team in 1875. The club was reformed as Everton in 1879 with Brettell as a member of the committee during the club's first year. After his playing career ended, he continued as a full-time reporter for local newspaper the Liverpool Mercury.

He joined Bolton Wanderers in 1896, again as secretary-manager. Two years later in February 1898, he was appointed manager of Tottenham Hotspur, and took up the post on 14 March 1898 soon after the club had been converted into a Public limited company. He signed a number of players from Bolton Wanderers and other northern clubs, including John Cameron from Everton who took over as manager of Spurs after Bretell left. His stay as the club's manager was relatively brief; he resigned in February 1899 to join Portsmouth after they offered him substantially more money to take the job.

His first season in charge was also Portsmouth's first in the Southern League and adapted to their new surroundings well, finishing fourth in the league table. He left the club in June 1901 by "mutual agreement"; according to Football Chat "a detailed explanation [would serve] no good purpose". "Let it suffice that the directors could not agree with him on certain rather important matters, and a mutual agreement was arrived at by which he consented to resign".

It would be another two years before he took up his final managerial role when Brettell was invited to build a professional team for Plymouth Argyle in 1903, an offer which he accepted.

Having been able to call upon twenty-eight years of experience as a football administrator and manager, he succeeded in his task and led the club into the Southern League for the 1903–04 season. He used his extensive network of contacts to bring a number of experienced professionals to Home Park, including; Andy Clark, Jack Fitchett, Bob Jack, Billy Leech and Jack Peddie. He led the club to creditable ninth- and fourth-place finishes in the Southern League, as well as winning the Western League in 1905. Brettell left the club at the end of his second season in charge and wouldn't manage a professional team again, but his place in English football history was assured.

== Later life ==
It is believed that he retired altogether the following year, but only a little more is known about him. He was the son of William Brettell, foreman at a nut and bolt works, and Charlotte Burgess. He moved to the Liverpool area with his parents in the 1860s, became a school teacher in the 1880s and 1890s, marrying Lavinia Isabel Spearman in 1882, with whom he had 10 children. After his professional career in football finished he continued to live in Plymouth, working as a clerk to a carrier firm in 1911. He died in Dartford, Kent, in 1936 aged 74.
