= Jack Fitchett =

English footballer and actor

Personal information
- Full name: John Fitchett
- Date of birth: 21 February 1880
- Place of birth: Chorlton-cum-Hardy, England
- Date of death: 1 November 1942 (aged 62)
- Place of death: Plymouth, England
- Height: 5 ft 10 in (1.78 m)
- Positions: Full-back; half-back

Youth career
- Talbot

Senior career*
Years	Team	Apps	(Gls)
1897–1902	Bolton Wanderers	76	(4)
1902	Manchester United	0	(0)
1902–1903	Southampton	8	(0)
1903	Manchester United	5	(1)
1903–1904	Plymouth Argyle	27^{a}	(0)
1904–1905	Manchester United	11	(0)
1905	Manchester City	0	(0)
1905–1906	Fulham	2	(0)
1906–19??	Sale Holmfield		
1910	Exeter City		
- * Club domestic league appearances and goals

John ('Jack') Fitchett (21 February 1880 – 1 November 1942) was an English footballer who played at full-back or half-back for Bolton Wanderers, Southampton, Manchester United, Plymouth Argyle, Manchester City, Fulham and Exeter City.

== Football career ==
Fitchett was born in Chorlton-cum-Hardy, Manchester and represented Manchester Schoolboys while playing his youth football with Talbot FC. In May 1897, he joined Bolton Wanderers where he remained for five years, making 76 appearances in The Football League. During his time with Bolton Wanderers he made three appearances for the Football League in representative matches against the Irish League in November 1899, November 1900 and November 1901, and also played in an unofficial international against Germany in 1901.

In the spring of 1902 he joined Manchester United for the first time but, before he could make a first-team appearance, he moved to the south coast to join Southampton of the Southern League in May 1902. At Southampton, he was used as cover for Samuel Meston at left-half and, although he played in five of the first six matches, he lost his place to Meston at the start of November and only made four further appearances, including one in the FA Cup defeat to Notts County. In his time at The Dell, Fitchett was known for his "energetic tackling and neat passing" as well as for his "over-elaboration".

Fitchett returned to Manchester United in March 1903 and made five appearances before the end of the 1902–03 season. His debut for United came on 21 March when he scored in a 5–1 defeat of Leicester City.

Fitchett's stay at Bank Street was short-lived and in May 1903 he returned to the Southern League to join Plymouth Argyle, who were making their debut in the league. Fitchett was known to Argyle's manager Frank Brettell under whom he had played at Bolton Wanderers. At Bolton he had played alongside Bob Jack, who he persuaded to join Argyle for their debut league season. Jack was to go on to make over 100 appearances for Argyle as well as replacing Brettell as manager, a post he held until 1938. Primarily used as a left-back, Pritchett was a regular member of Argyle's first professional side, making 46 appearances in all competitions.

In June 1904, he once again returned to Manchester United although his second "debut" was not until January 1905. By the end of the season, he was a regular at left-back, but in the summer of 1905 he moved across the city to join Manchester City. His stay was very brief and in June 1905, he again returned to the Southern League to join Fulham. At Fulham, he was little used, making only three appearances before bringing his professional career to a close at the end of the 1905–06 season.

== Theatre management ==
During his youth, Fitchett was an actor and was a member of Fred Karno's Theatrical Company. He had appeared with Charlie Chaplin in The Mumming Birds.

Following his retirement from professional football, Fitchett settled in Devon, becoming manager of the Vaudeville Theatre in Exeter. In February 1910, he briefly resumed his football career to assist Exeter City.

After World War I, Fitchett became manager of the New Palace Theatre in Union Street, Plymouth. After he retired as the theatre manager, he became the licensee of the Royal Sovereign public house in Union Street.

Fitchett died at the Royal Sovereign on 1 November 1942, at the age of 62.

== Notes ==
- ^a In total, Fitchett made 40 league appearances for Plymouth Argyle, of which 27 were in the Southern Football League and 13 in the Western League. As the Southampton club historians only include the Southern League appearances in their statistics, the same is done here for consistency.

== Bibliography ==
- Chalk, Gary; Holley, Duncan (1987). Saints – A complete record. Breedon Books. ISBN 0-907969-22-4.
- Holley, Duncan; Chalk, Gary (1992). The Alphabet of the Saints. ACL & Polar Publishing. ISBN 0-9514862-3-3.
- Joyce, Michael (2004). Football League Players' Records 1888 to 1939. Nottingham: Tony Brown. ISBN 1-899468-67-6.
