= Die andere Seite =

Die andere Seite is German for "the other side". It may refer to:

- The Other Side (Kubin novel), a 1909 novel by Alfred Kubin
- The Other Side (1931 film), a German war film directed by Heinz Paul
- Die andere Seite (opera), 2010 opera by composer Michael Obst

== See also ==
- The Other Side (disambiguation)
