= Palace Theatre, Plymouth =

Disused theatre in Devon, England

- New Palace Theatre of Varieties; Academy Disco; Dance Academy
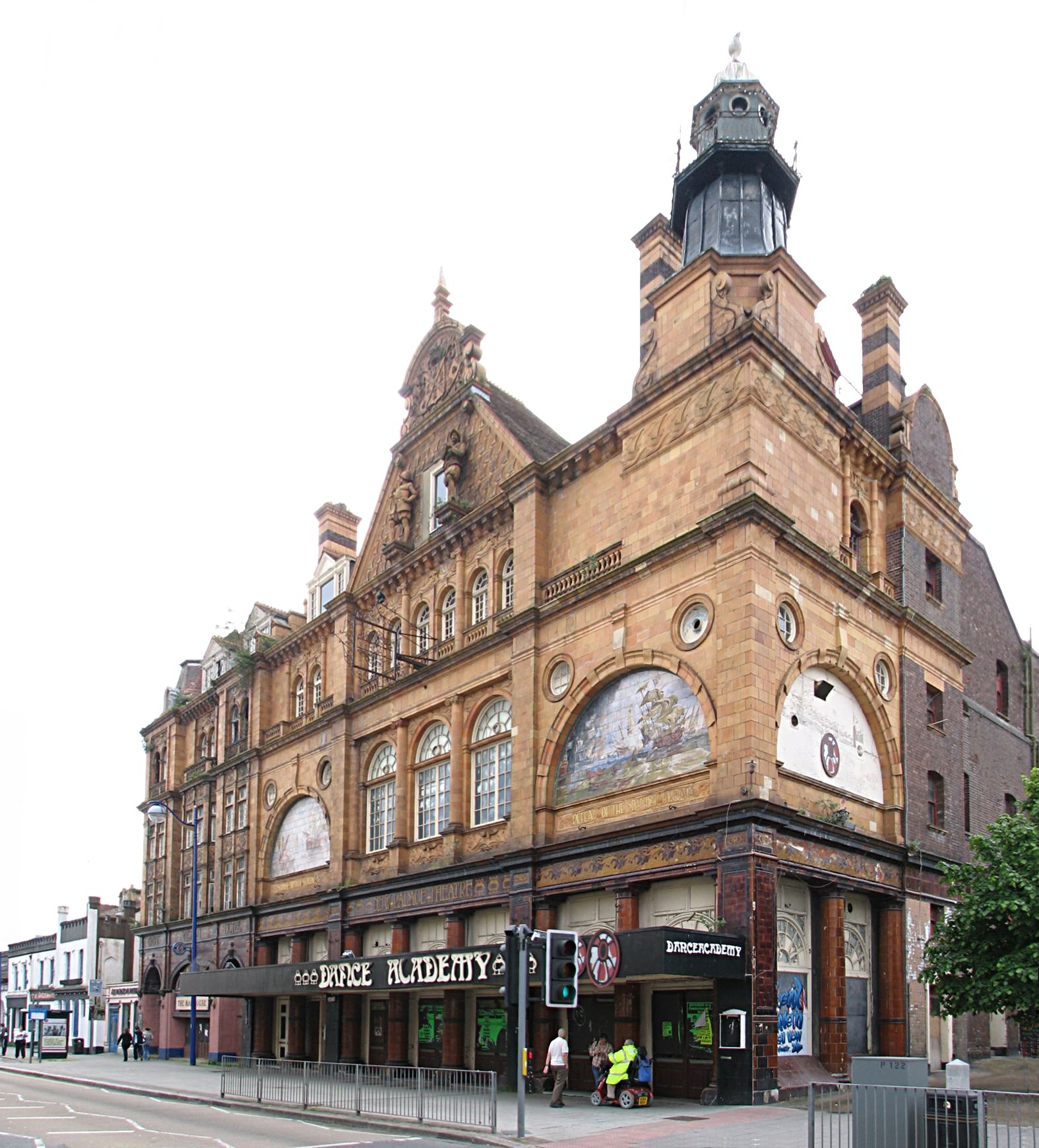
- Interactive map of Palace Theatre, Plymouth
- Address: 121–123 Union Street; Plymouth; United Kingdom
- Coordinates: 50.36965°N 4.15355°W
- Owner: Manoucehr Bahmanzadeh
- Capacity: Original: 1,610; 1945: 1,408
- Type: Music Hall
- Current use: None

Construction
- Opened: 5 September 1898
- Closed: 6 May 2006
- Years active: 1898–2006
- Architects: Wimperis & Arber

The Palace Theatre is a disused theatre in Union Street, Plymouth, Devon in south west England. It opened in 1898 as a music hall but was damaged by fire only three months after opening, and was re-opened in 1899 as the New Palace Theatre of Varieties. In 1961 it was converted to a bingo hall, but later reverted to being a theatre as the Palace Theatre until 1983, when it became The Academy disco and finally operated as the Dance Academy, before being closed after Class A drugs were found on the premises.

The theatre was built in the Flemish Renaissance style, with the interior in an Art Nouveau style, with nautical features. It is now deteriorating while an agreement is reached about its future and it is listed as an "at risk" building. It is a grade II* listed building.

== Opening ==
The theatre was built in 1898 on the corner of Union Street and Phoenix Street, for the joint owners, United Counties Theatres Limited and Horace and Lechmere Livermore (the "Livermore Brothers"), to replace the original Palace of Varieties which had operated at the nearby St. James's Hall since 1866. The site was originally occupied by Frederick Burner, tobacconist, Jonathan Crowl, butcher, Mark Durbin, provision dealer, and John Shepheard, bootmaker.

The theatre was designed by William Arber of Wimperis & Arber from Sackville Street, London, and cost £95,000 to erect. The development included the adjacent Grand Western Hotel which cost a further £87,000.

The theatre was opened for a private viewing on Friday 2 September 1898 by a large number of invited guests who were entertained by the Royal Naval Band, directed by Mr. E. Binding with the first public show at 7.30 p.m. on the following Monday 5 September. Tickets for the opening show were priced at 2s 6d for the stalls, 1s 6d for the grand circle and 1s for the gallery.

The first show ran for three hours and featured a variety of acts. After a rendition of the National Anthem by the Princess Ladies' Orchestra from the Promenade Pier, the show was opened by Leopoldine, described as "a lady who is very clever on the parallel bars and flying rings and kindred implements". She was followed in turn by comedian Harry Comlin, Arthur Vining and Nellie Coleman (vocalists) and singer Emmie Ames. Adele and May Lilian, the Levey Sisters, were "very chic", and "one of the features of the evening" while the Marvellous Craggs "were encored again and again for their wonderful acrobatic work". Walter and Edie Cassons performed "their highly amusing musical vaudeville" Honours are Easy. Other acts included Walter Stockwell, a "character vocalist", Emmie Ames, a vocalist, and Fred Darby, roller skater, who closed the show.

During the interval, a formal opening speech was made by Mr. L.C.J. Livermore for the owners who welcomed the audience and apologised for the delay in opening the theatre, "the long looked for come at last", and promised "better class" acts in future. William Arber, the architect thanked the audience for their warm applause and said that he was pleased to have given "the three towns ... a hall that they would be proud of". Livermore went on to say that if the audience "patronised the new hall as they should there was nothing the directors would not do to give them satisfaction". Mr. E.J. Dexter, the manager of the theatre, also thanked the audience for their warm reception assuring them that it would be "my pleasure to do everything I can for you during the coming season". He said that he had travelled widely throughout Europe and in his opinion the only two theatres that were more beautiful were the Opera Houses in Berlin and Paris.

== Original interior ==
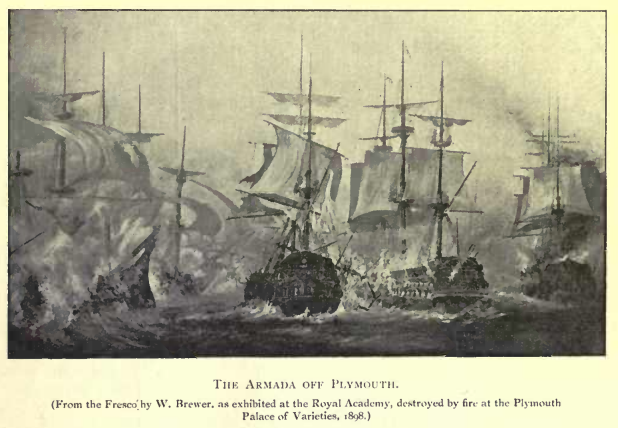
The Armada off Plymouth (From the fresco by W. Brewer destroyed by fire at the Plymouth Palace of Varieties, 1898.)

In its original form, the theatre could accommodate 2,500 spectators. The auditorium was laid out with stalls on the ground floor behind which were the "ordinary pit seats". Entrance to the pits was gained by a tunnel described as "an electrically lighted subterranean passage, fitted with mirror panels". Above the ground floor were the cantilevered grand circle with the gallery on the top floor, with no pillars to obstruct the view of the stage. On each side of the proscenium were four boxes, eight in all.

The interior was decorated with a naval theme reflecting the history of Plymouth. Over the upper stage boxes were "poop-lanterns" resembling the sterns of three-deck warships; below these were crossed anchors with the centres containing ships' figureheads. Above the auditorium was a domed ceiling, which was decorated with "historical paintings" as was the proscenium. The scenes illustrated included the knighting of Sir Francis Drake by Queen Elizabeth I, HMS Victory and the Spanish Armada. Medallions bearing portraits of naval and military heroes decorated the front of the gallery and grand circle.

On each side of the proscenium there was a clock face on which the number of the turn was illuminated.

In the main entrance there was a marble staircase, adorned with marble pillars, leading to the grand circle. In the foyer, described as "beyond question one of the handsomest out of London", was a painting of "the meeting of Blücher and Wellington" after the Battle of Waterloo.

=== The fire of 1898 ===
In the early morning of 23 December 1898, a passing police officer spotted that there was a fire in the building. Although the fire brigade were called immediately, the rear of the building was well alight. By the time that the fire had been brought under control, the stage area, dressing rooms and the entire rear section of the building had been destroyed. As the safety curtain had not been lowered, the fire had spread into the auditorium and as a result most of the decorative features were also destroyed including the domed ceiling and the panels illustrating naval scenes.

The previous evening, the entertainment had included a sketch based on the Battle of Trafalgar, which included a "spectacular naval scene" involving the firing of stage cannon. Although firemen had been in attendance during the performance, heat from a cannon had ignited a curtain which later flared into flame.

=== Rebuilding ===
The theatre was rebuilt after the fire and was re-opened on 22 May 1899, although the interior was now much plainer than it had been originally. The paintings on the ceiling which had been destroyed in the fire were replaced by "an allegorical group".

== Present interior ==
According to the 1989 edition of Nikolaus Pevsner's Buildings of England: Devon, the building "represents the theatre as a place for lavish entertainment as reflected in the rich and exciting decoration and architectural detail, with particular attention to nautical themes".

The stage is 28 ft. deep by 60 ft. wide with a proscenium opening of 29 ft. 6 in. and the grid height is 58 ft.

The rectangular proscenium arch is flanked by large boxes in the form of a ship's transom, decorated with plaster-work representing clinker planks each surmounted by a canopy bearing a pair of ship's lanterns. The two-tiered auditorium has panelled walls under a domed ceiling. The curved balcony is partly supported on slender cast-iron columns and decorated with military motifs in plaster-work.

The foyer opens onto a Sicilian marble balustraded staircase leading to a large first-floor saloon. Both the foyer and saloon are decorated with friezes with illustrations of nereids, dolphins, cherubs etc. The saloon is decorated in the Cinquecento style with a coffered ceiling and enriched spandrels above the arcades and Ionic capitals at the top of marble pilasters and columns. The saloon is lit by three large round-arched windows.

The manager's accommodation is situated on the third floor and can be accessed by a separate entrance on Phoenix Street.

== Exterior ==
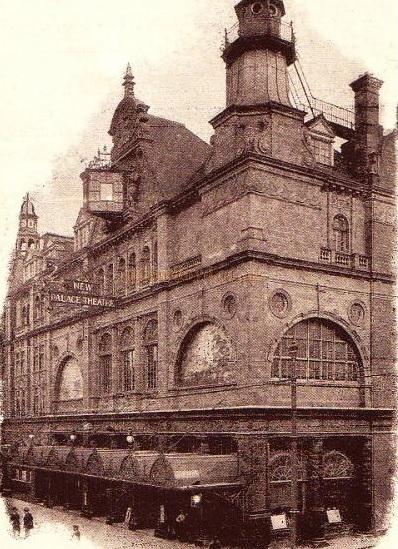
The Palace Theatre of Varieties, Plymouth – From a Variety Programme for the Theatre on 25 September 1905.

The building is described by English Heritage as being in the "Northern Renaissance style with Modern Style (British Art Nouveau style) details".

The building comprises two main sections: the former Grand Western Hotel occupied three bays at the eastern end of the building, with the New Palace Theatre occupying the seven bays to the west. The whole building is constructed of brick and yellow terracotta with the ground floor decorated with glazed tiles. The roof is of plain tiles with four banded brick and terracotta chimney stacks.

The Grand Western Hotel section is four stories high with dormer windows; at the corner there is now a small turret with a bell-shaped roof. Originally this was much higher with an arcaded section above which was a domed shaped roof surmounted by a weather vane, as seen in the 1905 illustration.

The ground floor has three arched bays, with the central bay being larger than those either side. In the arches are a variety of entrance doors (not original) above which are semi-circular spoked fan windows. Above the ground floor there is a tiled entablature bearing the legend "Grand Western Hotel". The first and second floors have central oriel windows set back, on top of which is a balcony with a turned balustrade, with smaller windows either side, slightly forward. The windows are decorated with Art Nouveau panels. On the top, third floor there are three pairs of arched windows with square columns.

The right-hand, Old Palace Theatre section has seven bays in the 2:3:2 formation with a colonnade of Tuscan columns between which are various entrance doors, some of which are original. Originally, the building had a wrought-iron canopy with seven arched sections, one above each entrance door, but this has been replaced by an unattractive modern canopy projecting from half-way up the height of the columns.

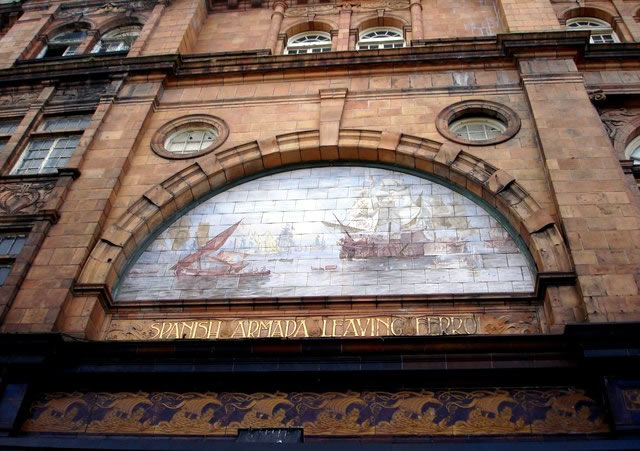
The left-hand decorative panel depicting the Spanish Armada leaving Ferrol.

Above the ground floor, the entablature retains the original fine quality lettering and decorative detail, bearing the inscription "New Palace Theatre". The first floor facade is dominated by two semi-circular tiled panels on which are depicted scenes of the Spanish Armada; that on the left depicts the "Spanish Armada Leaving Ferrol" while that on the right depicts the "Defeat of the Spanish Armada". Above each panel is a pair of circular oculi windows. The central section has three round-arched transom windows flanked by Ionic half columns.

Above the central section is a tall "piano nobile" section with three pairs of arched windows, with each pair flanked by columns similar to those below. Above these is a large Flemish gable with a carved and shaped pediment with finial and a pair of statues of Spanish soldiers standing on brackets either side of the central window. In the centre of the pediment is a shield bearing the coat of arms of Plymouth, with the Cross of St. Andrew and the four turrets which overlooked the Barbican. Originally, a large two-sided clock was situated outside the present day window. Below this was a sign at right-angles to the building bearing the legend "New Palace Theatre", as shown in the 1905 illustration.

On the top, second floor above the left panel is a pair of arched windows similar to the central ones. Above the right panel the wall is blank although a balustrade stretches to the midpoint from the central section. The corner is surmounted by a turret which has a balcony and bell shaped dome with a ball finial. According to Pevsner, the turret is "rather reminiscent of Winstanley's ill-fated lighthouse".

The decorative style is briefly continued around the western edge of the building fronting Phoenix Street. On the ground floor, the first two bays have semi-circular spoked fan windows. Above these is a semi-circular window, the same size as the two panels at the front. Originally this window was glazed but is now blanked off; the decoration is completed by a pair of oculi windows as on the front with a single arched window on the top floor.

Set in the pavement outside the theatre entrances are four plaques featuring copies of programmes and playbills from the 1950s.

== History ==
=== Music Hall and Variety Theatre ===
Following the fire of December 1898, the theatre re-opened on 22 May 1899 under new manager, Mr. James Wynes. In 1906, a sliding roof was installed into the theatre.

In September 1911, the theatre changed hands for the first time when it was sold to a syndicate headed by G. Hamilton Baines who also owned the Theatre Royal, Cardiff. In 1913, the theatre was sold to Thomas Hoyle for £25,000 but after three years he sold it on to Myer Fredman, who in turn sold it to John Tellam in 1924. Tellam died shortly after purchasing the theatre and it was then re-purchased by Thomas Hoyle for £25,000. Hoyle was also the owner of the Cinedrome cinema in Ebrington Street, Plymouth and the Belgrave Electric Theatre in Belgrave Road, Plymouth. During this period, the theatre was managed by Jack Fitchett, a former professional footballer who had played for Bolton Wanderers, Manchester United and Plymouth Argyle.

Following Hoyle's death in 1932, the theatre passed to his widow, Mary. Mrs. Hoyle remained in charge of the theatre until her death in January 1945. Mrs. Hoyle kept the theatre open throughout the war, including during the blitz of 1940–1941. On 21 April 1941, several incendiary devices hit the theatre but the fires were quickly extinguished and little damage was done.

Mary Hoyle died in January 1945, after which a sale was agreed to Saul Silver, a commission agent from Exeter for a price of £77,000. This sale fell through and the theatre was eventually sold to a consortium of six businessmen, headed by Gerard Heath. In 1949, the theatre was closed for refurbishment, including the installation of new seating. It was re-opened a year later, with the opening show being headed by the Billy Cotton Band Show featuring Alan Breeze in "Wakey! Wakey!". Following the refurbishment, the theatre could accommodate 1,440 with 339 in the orchestra stalls, 307 in the pit stalls, 214 in the dress circle, 148 in the rear circle and 400 in the gallery with another 32 in the four boxes.

A lack of touring shows forced the theatre to close again in 1954; during this period, the opportunity was taken to further renovate the theatre, including enlarging the stage and rebuilding the dressing rooms. The theatre was offered to Plymouth City Council in 1956, but the council declined to purchase it. There were further closures for five months in 1956 and then in February 1959. The theatre was again offered to the city, for a price of £15,000, but again the council turned the offer down.

In 1961, Palace Theatre (Bingo) Limited acquired the theatre and converted the Circle lounge bar into a club. The theatre re-opened in 1962 with Reg Sully as the resident manager; the opening show was a pantomime, "Sinbad the Sailor". The theatre also became the home of a local amateur operatics group, the Carmenians, whose productions included "Oklahoma!" and "Kiss Me Kate". During this period, the theatre gained a reputation for being haunted, with lights turning themselves on and off and chained doors being unlocked.

In March 1965, the building was sold to Arthur Fox, a club owner from Manchester, for £50,000. The theatre became a club showing striptease and wrestling, and bingo under the "Star Bingo" style. In the summer of 1975, the business of Star Bingo was sold to the EMI group, and the theatre was re-opened on 19 April 1977 with a performance of "The Magic Flute" by the English Music Theatre Company, followed by a three-week jubilee show by the Carmenians.

The theatre was again closed for refurbishment in July 1978 and re-opened under the management of John Redgrave on 23 December for the pantomime, "Cinderella". Shortly afterwards, the owners of the theatre, New Palace Theatre (Plymouth) Limited, were experiencing financial difficulties and on 27 May 1980, the theatre was closed and the contents put up for sale. The theatre had one further brief respite when it re-opened on 16 May 1981 with a revue performance from Danny La Rue before finally closing as a theatre in 1983 to become the "Academy Disco". By this time, the city council had opened the new Theatre Royal, which effectively ended any prospect of live theatre at the New Palace Theatre.

By 1994, the building was owned by Graham Blow, a businessman from Lytham St. Annes in Lancashire, who was unsuccessfully seeking Government assistance to refurbish the building. The building was then sold to an Iranian businessman and club owner, Manoucehr Bahmanzadeh, who renamed it as "The Dance Academy".

==== Performers ====
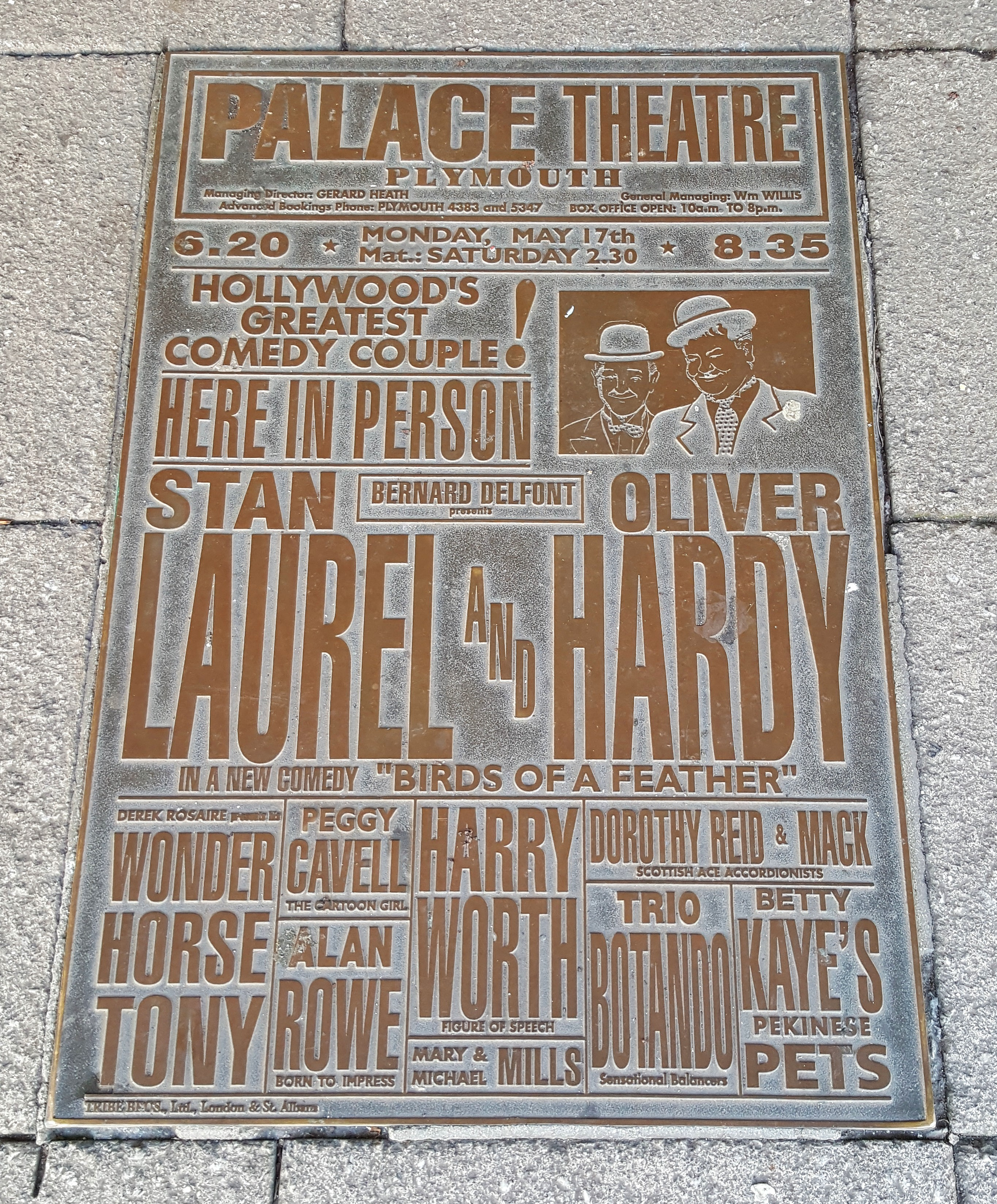
A brass plate on the pavement outside the theatre commemorates the live show starring Laurel and Hardy on 17 May 1954.

During the years in which the theatre operated as a music hall, many well-known acts appeared on its stage. On 9 December 1902, Lillie Langtry appeared at the theatre portraying Virginia, Duchess of Keensbury in a production of The Crossways, which she had written in collaboration with J. Hartley Manners.

In August 1907, Gertie Gitana was on the bill, performing songs such as Nellie Dean; the Western Morning News described her as "A youthful artiste possessing a well developed voice and a most winsome style. She captivated her audience by a fine rendering of Nellie Dene (sic), a very difficult song to sing and she finished with a coon song and a well-executed dance which were much appreciated".

In March 1909, the show included a presentation of a film of the boxing match between Johnny Summers and Jimmy Britt which had taken place at Covent Garden, London on 22 February. In August of that year, Harry Houdini was the star act. In his show, he challenged carpenters from the nearby Devonport Naval Dockyard to make a box from which he would not be able to escape. Houdini was nailed inside the box but managed to escape within 12 minutes. Later that week, Houdini was "securely chained" before diving off the Halfpenny Bridge, which connected Devonport with Stonehouse; Houdini returned to the surface within a minute of entering the water.

In 1931, Charlie Chaplin visited Plymouth as the guest of Lady Astor, the M.P. for Plymouth Sutton. He appeared on the stage at The New Palace Theatre on 16 November 1931, before catching a late train to London. Chaplin was seen off at the station by the manager of the theatre, Jack Fitchett, with whom he had previously appeared in The Mumming Birds when they were members of Fred Karno's Theatrical Company.

Among the acts appearing in 1941 were comedians Nor Kiddie and Tommy Handley who headed the cast of the variety shows on 20 and 27 January respectively, Billy Cotton and his band, Arthur Lucan ("Old Mother Riley"), Henry Hall and his "orchestra" and comedian Douglas Byng.

The comedy double act Laurel and Hardy were billed to appear at the theatre during their final tour of Europe. Starting on 17 May 1954, they were scheduled to appear for one week. They were performing the routine which had been specially written for the tour, "Birds of a Feather". Among the support acts were the comedian Harry Worth, "Wonder Horse Tony", Peggy Cavell ("The Cartoon Girl") and Alan Rowe ("Born to Impress"). After performing the first night, Oliver Hardy was taken ill with flu and suffered a mild heart attack and as a result the duo had to pull out of the rest of the engagement. A brass plate on the pavement outside the theatre commemorates their performance.

=== The Dance Academy ===
Manoucehr Bahmanzadeh acquired the building in 1997 and renamed it "The Dance Academy". It soon became one of the top dance venues in the UK attracting top D.J.s such as Ferry Corsten, Judge Jules, Lisa Lashes, Dave Pearce, Gilles Peterson, Carl Cox and Sasha. The club could accommodate 1,300 dancers in two rooms and had seven bars and "gained a heady reputation" as a top trance and hard house club under resident D.J., Tom Costelloe. By 2005, the club claimed that it had in excess of 20,000 members.

In 1998, Bahmanzadeh entered a short partnership with the team behind "Scream" and established "Eyecon", a weekly hard house and trance night from 10.30 p.m. to 8 a.m. on Saturdays. This grew to be one of the UK's biggest dance events and was voted Club of the Year (West region) in the clubbing magazine "Mixmag" in 2004. As well as Eyecon, the club hosted other musical genres, such as Legends of the Dark Black a drum and bass night, held on the last Friday of each month. and the infamous Jelly Jazz parties. In 2004, the club had a brief but unsuccessful attempt to present live music, hosting groups such as Hope of the States.

==== Closure ====
In May 2006, a five-month-long police operation showed that ecstasy, a Class A drug, was being used and dealt in the Dance Academy, and it closed as a result, with Bahmanzadeh, Costelloe and two other people being charged with permitting the supply of Class A drugs. Following the closure, protests were held outside the building by clubbers opposed to the closure.

In July 2008, Bahmanzadeh and Costelloe were found guilty of allowing the sale of a class A drug and were sentenced to jail terms of nine years and five years respectively. 16 drug dealers had also been arrested following the raid in May 2006 and had been sentenced to a total of 27 years in jail. During the trial, the court heard that the sale and consumption of ecstasy was "rampant" and dealing was "overt and blatant". In December 2008, both men appealed against their convictions on the grounds that the court should not have accepted evidence from undercover police officers, but the appeals were rejected.

In September 2010, Costelloe was the subject of an application under the Proceeds of Crime Act 2002 under which assets deemed to have come from a crime could be seized and confiscated. The Crown Prosecution Service (C.P.S.) calculated that Costelloe had only benefited to the extent of his wages when employed at the club, i.e. £6,600. As Costelloe had no significant assets, the confiscation order was agreed at Nil. Costelloe was released from jail after the confiscation hearing and started to re-build his career as a D.J.

Bahmanzadeh was ordered to pay £1 million under the Proceeds of Crime Act. For the purposes of assessing Bahmanzadeh's net worth, the theatre building was valued at a nominal £1 by his defence, although the C.P.S. considered the value to be between £50,000 and £100,000. Bahmanzadeh was also ordered to pay £75,000 towards the cost of his trials. In January 2012, the Member of Parliament for Plymouth Moor View, Alison Seabeck, asked a question in the House of Commons, enquiring whether or not the confiscation order had been paid. On behalf of the Secretary of State for Justice, Crispin Blunt replied that the sum had been paid in full in June 2011 together with £19,977 of interest for late payment. Mrs. Seabeck was not satisfied with this response and she sought clarity over where the money was actually paid. She laid down a further question for the Secretary of State asking "whether or not the monies levied were paid directly to the Crown Prosecution Service or into another account". Mr. Blunt replied that most of the money (£950,730) had been paid from a Jersey bank account and retained by the Jersey authorities. Only £69,248 had been paid in the UK of which £12,984 had been paid to the C.P.S. and the balance retained by the Home Office. Mrs. Seabeck voiced her surprise at this decision, describing the amount paid to the C.P.S. as "derisory". A spokesman for the Jersey authorities said that the Attorney General's office was "currently in communication with the Home Office regarding the matter".

In January 2012, Bahmanzadeh applied to the Criminal Cases Review Commission (C.R.C.C.) for the right to lodge a further appeal against his conviction and sentence, on the grounds that new evidence had come to light which cast doubt on the reliability of a key prosecution witness at the original trial. The C.R.C.C. accepted that there were grounds for a fresh appeal and on 26 January they referred Bahmanzadeh's conviction and sentence to the Court of Appeal. Bahmanzadeh was released from prison on bail on 13 July 2012; he had been serving his sentence at Ford Open prison while working on day-release at a Brighton charity shop.

The appeal was heard at the Court of Appeal in November 2012. The court heard allegations that one of the witnesses for the prosecution at the original trial was a doorman who, after he had been sacked by Bahmanzadeh, supplied "intelligence" to the police about activities in the club. The court heard that the doorman had been involved in other criminal activities and was therefore not a reliable witness. Although Lord Justice Laws accepted that the doorman was not a credible witness, his evidence was "by no means at the heart of the case". As a result the original conviction was upheld. Under new sentencing guidelines, Bahmanzadeh's original sentence of 9 years in jail should be reduced to 7½. As he had been imprisoned in July 2008, he had already served half his sentence and was therefore entitled to be immediately released from custody. Following the failure of the appeal against conviction, Bahmanzadeh continued to protest his innocence, calling the affair a "joke".

In February 2013, Plymouth City Council reviewed Bahmanzadeh's dance licence; at the hearing on 26 February, the licensing sub-committee decided to revoke his entertainment licence, thus preventing him from re-opening the Dance Academy.

== Current situation and prospects for the future ==
In October 1974, the theatre and hotel were grade II* listed. The property was later placed on the English Heritage "At Risk Register".

In October 2006, Plymouth City Council published the Millbay and Stonehouse Area Action Plan which stated:

The Palace Theatre will be regenerated and be a key landmark on Union Street, which will have regained its prominent position as one of the most vibrant arteries in the City.

The Palace Theatre was formally(sic) a key element of the vibrant Union Street and remains a landmark building. It is a grade II* Listed Building and therefore is one of the most important historic buildings in Plymouth. It is currently being used as a nightclub, but is in need of major refurbishment appropriate to its conservation status. It has been highlighted on the national and local Buildings at Risk Register as a building requiring urgent attention. A number of ideas have been generated during recent years on ways to restore the building to give it a use that can be appreciated by a wider section of the community. However none of these ideas have led to a firm deliverable proposal.

Despite this, the local authority has repeatedly declined to commit any finances towards the restoration of the building, both in the 1950s, when they turned down opportunities to acquire the building and again in 2011, when they declined the offer from English Heritage to finance 80% of the cost of repairs if the council put up the balance in conjunction with a repair notice or urgent works notice to at least make the property weatherproof pending a decision about its future.

In 2008 it was included on a list by The Victorian Society of the UK's ten most endangered and best Victorian and Edwardian buildings. The Victorian Society described the building as "crying out for attention" and expressed fears for the future of the building in the absence of urgent action. At this time the building was said to be suffering badly with damp with a leaking roof and rotten floorboards. In July 2010, the building was put on the Theatres Trust's list of the ten most "at risk" buildings; a spokesman described the building as "empty and in a poor state of repair". Despite this, the trust was hopeful that the theatre could be restored with funding from the National Lottery. The trust described the theatre as "a fantastic and opulent theatre... one of Plymouth's best surviving Victorian buildings... being of great significance and value with enormous potential to the people of Plymouth."

Following his release from jail, in July 2012 Bahmanzadeh pledged to re-open the Dance Academy, stating that the deterioration to the building was "cosmetic" and that "nothing bad was happening to the building". In October 2012, Bahmanzadeh claimed that he and a member of Plymouth City Council's planning and regeneration department had toured the building to inspect its state of repair, whereas the council spokesman said that "A council building surveyor met with the owner to discuss a minor structural matter". Following this "meeting", Bahmanzadeh offered to have discussions with anyone wishing to restore the building "with one condition – the help is unconditional. Don't put any conditions, like 'give me the lease' because nothing like that is going to happen".

In September 2012, the "Stonehouse Action" group held a street party in Union Street to celebrate the theatre and to increase public awareness of its present state. Various other community groups have campaigned for the restoration of the New Palace Theatre to its former glory as a music hall while others seek the re-opening of the Dance Academy. In February 2013, "Project Palace" was founded in an attempt to bring together all the groups wishing to save the building; Stonehouse Action and the Friends of the New Palace Theatre are planning to form a building preservation trust to secure and renovate the building. The group claim that they have agreed with Bahmanzadeh to take a year's lease on the property with an option to purchase it from its present owner.

After his entertainment licence was revoked, Bahmanzadeh suggested that he might transfer the building to "an Islamic charity to turn it into a mosque". This led to the creation of an online petition by protestors who wanted the Dance Academy to be re-opened.

In the local redevelopment plan issued in October 2006, the City Council concluded: "An innovative and creative approach will be required in order to bring the building back into use and improve its external appearance." Although six years have elapsed, little progress has been made and the building continues to deteriorate. In July 2012, the local newspaper the Plymouth Herald, commented:

Its neglected state does not present our city in a good light, and there is a huge groundswell of feeling that it must be brought back to life – whatever it ultimately becomes. It is a landmark with amazing history, and maybe its rebirth could help lead a revival of Union Street and bring fresh enjoyment to new generations. Whatever its past, we believe it still has a vital role to play in Plymouth's future.

In 2013, convicted fraudster David Welsh registered a company, Palace Theatre Project Limited which according to an interview in the local Plymouth Herald newspaper was seeking to refurbish the building. The company was dissolved in April 2016.

=== Restoration ===
In 2015 a charity based in the South-East of England purchased the venue on a 35 year lease off the owner. The charity (GO! Great opportunities) released plans to turn the empty venue into Plymouth's first ballroom while also being returned to a theatre again. The renovations started in May 2015 and were due to finish three years later in 2018. The project was the largest volunteer based project in the South-West of England. The charity pulled out of the project in March 2017.
