= The Other Side (Kazi and Banerjee novel) =

2013 novel by Faraaz Kazi and Vivek Banerjee

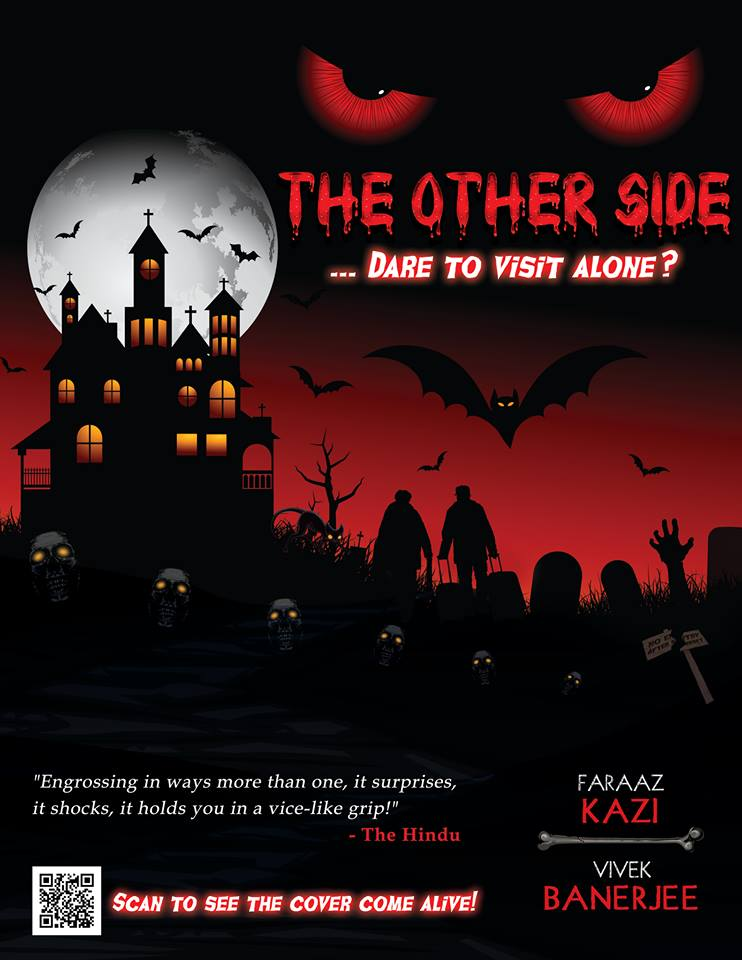
- The Other Side Book Cover
- Author: Faraaz Kazi, Vivek Banerjee
- Illustrator: DigiImprint Solutions
- Cover artist: DigiImprint Solutions
- Language: English
- Genre: Horror fiction
- Published: 2013
- Publication place: India
- Pages: 320
- ISBN: 9789350880760
- OCLC: 866143953

The Other Side is a horror fiction novel co-authored by Faraaz Kazi and Vivek Banerjee. The book, first published by Mahaveer Publishers in 2013, has the world's first animated book cover. The book was launched by horror film maker, Vikram Bhatt in Mumbai along with Aftab Shivdasani, Tia Bajpai and Vidya Malavade.

== Contents ==
The Other Side is composed of a foreword, prelude, 13 short stories, and epilogue sections. It is not to be confused with the distinguished 1908 classic horror novel with the identical title by Austrian artist/author Alfred Kubin.
