= Rotor DR1 =

- Directed by: Chad Kapper
- Written by: Steve Moses; Megan Ryberg
- Produced by: Tom Nicholson
- Starring: Christian Kapper; Natalie Welch; Steve Moses; Tom Nicholson; Bruno Gunn; David Windestål
- Cinematography: Tyler Clark
- Edited by: Patrick Casteel
- Music by: Patrick Casteel
- Production company: StoneKap Productions
- Distributed by: Cinema Libre Studio
- Release date: October 20, 2015
- Running time: 99 minutes
- Country: United States
- Language: English
- Budget: US$300,000

Rotor DR1 is a 2015 science fiction film directed by Chad Kapper, who also served as executive producer. The film stars Christian Kapper as a teenager looking for his missing father in a post-apocalyptic world where autonomous drones roam the skies. Rotor DR1 is a film-length cut of a 10-episode web series. Kapper and his team produced the series with the support of an online community that provided feedback before production and after each episode's release. Filming started in mid-2014 and took place mostly in Canton, Ohio. The team partnered with Cinema Libre Studio to edit a film from the series. The film was released on DVD and Blu-ray and via video on demand on October 20, 2015.

== Synopsis ==
In a post-apocalyptic world, an epidemic has killed off 90% of humanity. Survivors rebuild autonomous drones that roam the skies without instructions after being launched to deliver vaccines. A 16-year-old named Kitch finds a drone named DR1 and learns about his missing father's whereabouts. Maya, a member of a local crime syndicate, joins Kitch and DR1 to find Kitch's father.

== Cast ==
- Christian Kapper ... Kitch
- Natalie Welch ... Maya
- Steve Moses ... Hashtag
- Tom Nicholson ... 4C
- Bruno Gunn ... Jax

== Production ==
Rotor DR1 was directed by Chad Kapper, who also served as executive producer. The film's producers gathered feedback from Internet users through various channels including Facebook, Twitter, Google Docs, YouTube, and a custom-built forum. A YouTube channel called FliteTest grew to have nearly 370,000 subscribers and became the core community that provided feedback to Kapper and his team. The team shared a beat sheet and a conceptual trailer with the community and used its feedback to work on costumes and props. The community's feedback also resulted in the addition of new scenes and characters. With a production budget of US$300,000, filming began in mid-summer 2014 and lasted over 12 weeks. Filming mainly took place in Canton, Ohio with the director's son, Christian Kapper, as the protagonist. A 10-episode web series was produced, with each episode being shared with the community, which shared its feedback for the filming of the next episode. The team ultimately partnered with Cinema Libre Studio to edit the episodes into a feature film.

== Release ==
The film was released on DVD and Blu-ray and via video on demand on October 20, 2015.

== See also ==
- List of films featuring drones
