= Flipside (video game) =

- Developer: Team 3
- Engine: Source
- Platform: Windows
- Release: June 18, 2007
- Genre: Platform
- Mode: Single-player

Flipside is a mod for the video game Half-Life 2. It is a cardboard-themed side-scrolling platform game with the ability to turn the camera around 180 degrees to view the 2d cardboard world from the opposite side. Flipside was developed by Danish studio Team 3, a group of students from DADIU and released June 18, 2007.

== Plot ==
Flipside is a third-person total conversion mod of Valve's Half-Life 2. The player takes on the identity of a mental patient with extreme mood changes who is planning his escape from an insane asylum. The imaginary escape through the landscape surrounding the insane asylum takes place in a world put together from cardboard pieces and jumping jacks decorated with magazine cuttings, stickers, and drawings. Reflecting the extreme mood changes of the character, the player can at any point turn the camera around 180 degrees to see the world from the opposite side. One side is a happy, fluffy world with rainbows, bunnies, and bumble bees, while the other side is a gloomy, hostile world with thunderclouds, evil nurses, and killer wasps.

== Receptions ==
Flipside was an Independent Games Festival 2008 Finalist and received Mod DB's 2007 Editor's Choice award.

Mod DB gave the game a rating of 8.0, praising its original concept and graphics style while criticizing its sometimes frustrating controls and lackluster AI. Similarly, a review in PC Zone found the original premise and style in the game good enough to forgive the difficulty and rough keyboard controls. A review in Games for Windows: The Official Magazine calls the fun short-lived, but notes that it is worth it to see the art in motion and the dramatic camera effect when switching side.
