= Bruno Gunn =

American actor (born 1968)

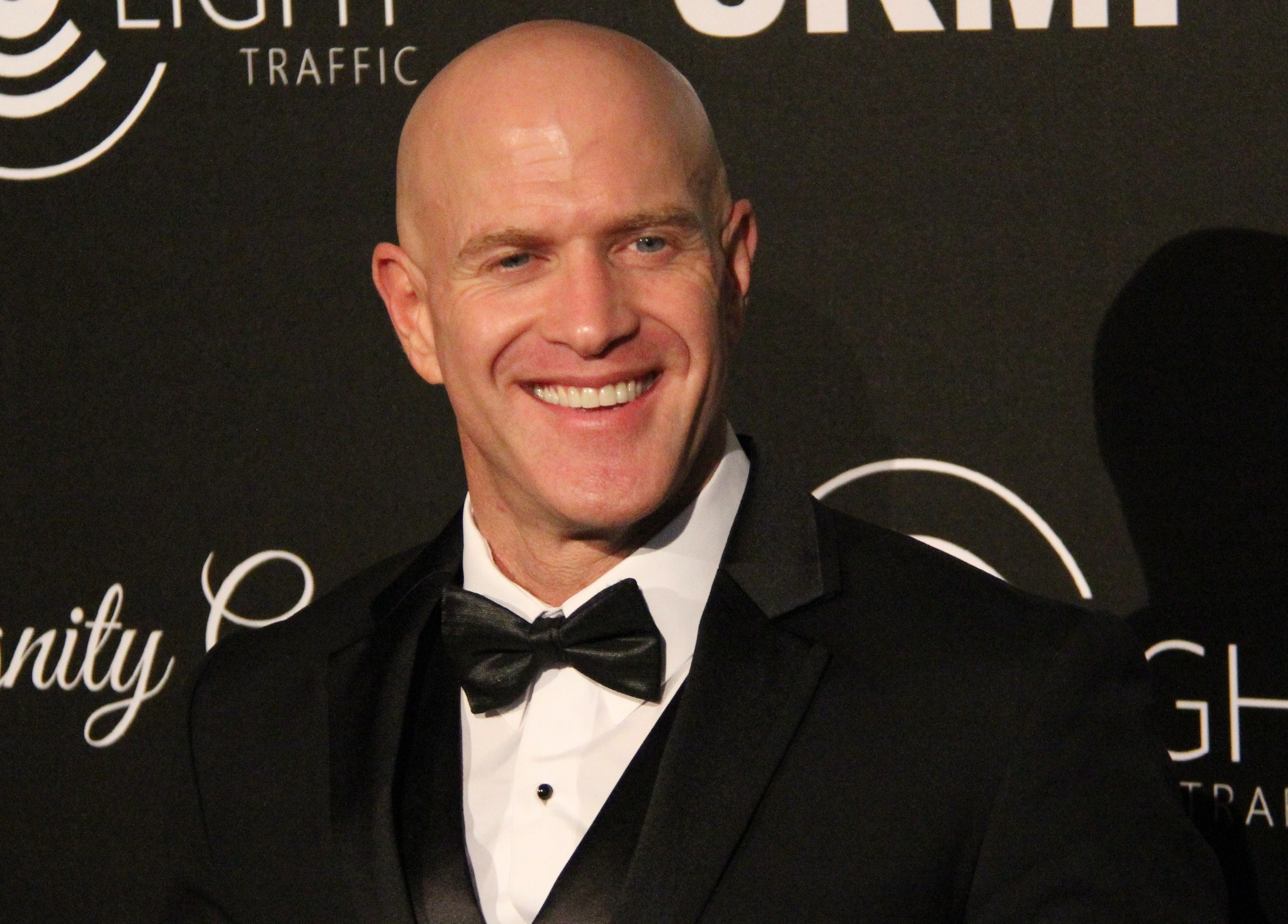
- Bruno Gunn in October 2013
- Born: November 8, 1968 (age 57); Canton, Ohio, United States
- Occupation: Actor
- Years active: 1997–present

Bruno Gunn (born November 8, 1968) is an American actor. He is best known for playing Brutus in The Hunger Games: Catching Fire and Walrus on HBO's Westworld.

== Life and career ==
Gunn started his acting career 1997, with a cameo in the Comedy Central series Pulp Comedy. He later appeared in the television series Haunted, Deep Cover, Oz, Late Night with Conan O'Brien, Law & Order: Special Victims Unit, Fastlane and Buffy the Vampire Slayer. Gunn appeared also in the television films Recipe for Disaster, Mending Fences and Edgar Floats. He also played minor roles in the films Celebrity, Mickey Blue Eyes , Oxygen, 28 Days, Herbie: Fully Loaded, Hotel California, Officer Downe, and Bad Teacher.
