= Burning Flipside =

Texas arts festival descended from Burning Man

Flipside
- Venue: Apache Pastures
- Locations: Rockdale, Texas, United States
- Inaugurated: May 1998
- Most recent: April 23–27, 2026
- Participants: 2,982 (actual in 2014)
- Website: www.burningflipside.com

Burning Flipside (or Flipside) is an annual effigy burn, display of creative arts, and self-expression of performances staged in Central Texas near Austin. Modeled on and associated with Burning Man, Flipside was the first regional Burning Man event.

Lasting five days during the Memorial Day weekend, it is significantly smaller than Burning Man, with 3131 tickets sold in 2022, compared to about 80,000 participants for Burning Man. Participants build a temporary city called Pyropolis; all of the structures in this city are dismantled and removed at the end of the event. The main structure, the "effigy", is burned the last night, as are many other pieces of art around Flipside.

== Organisation ==
Flipside was initially organized under the auspices of a limited liability company called Austin Artistic Deconstruction. This entity was wound down and succeeded in 2001 by another LLC, Austin Artistic Reconstruction. This was in turn succeeded by a 501(c)(3) nonprofit, Catalyst Collective, in 2023.

The legal entity prohibits all commercial use of photographs, video, film or any other medium taken at Burning Flipside without written permission. Therefore, media from Flipside is inherently non-free content. This prohibition on commercial use of imagery appeared as early as 1999.

== Principles ==
While Flipside, like all regional burns, adheres to the same principles as Burning Man in spirit, Flipside predates the formulation of Burning Man's 10 Principles and never formally adopted them. Instead, Flipside formulated three principles that are more abstract and cover most of the same ground as Burning Man's ten:

- Accountability
- Cooperation
- Self Expression

Despite this difference, Burning Flipside is regarded as a "ten principles event."

=== Other similarities ===
No Vending. Flipside is a non-commercial event; sales of any commodity (the one exception being ice) for cash is not allowed and may cause eviction from the event. Instead, a gift economy is used. Giving one gift in exchange for another is considered good form, but any kind of quid pro quo is a violation of the gift-economy rules

Leave No Trace. An extension of the self-reliance principle applied to outdoor living, requiring all participants to respect their environment and clean up everything they bring in. Participants try to leave the site cleaner than they found it rather than in an identical condition.

Art Installations—Flipside community members bring art to the event for display, including large free-standing works, fire art, and interactive pieces.

Theme camps—Groups of participants who build a structure or area for public entertainment with an underlying theme. (Example: Casineaux Camp - A camp with a Casino Theme with real gambling style games, but using donated prizes and fake coins.)

Performances—Flipside has a number of performance spaces that are used by musicians, theatre groups, DJs, fire performers, pageants, and interactive performances.

== Differences from Burning Man ==
Similar to Burning Man's Black Rock Rangers, the Pyropolis Rangers mediate disputes and maintain security at the event; they wear a similar khaki uniform, and attempt to be non-intrusive to other participants. Unlike Burning Man, however, the event is not regularly patrolled by law enforcement, although they arrive quickly in the event of an emergency.

Flipside has some other differences from Burning Man. Flipside's location is in a private camp area in the wooded, grassy Texas Hill Country, unlike the extremely flat, very dusty dried lake bed in Black Rock Desert where Burning Man is held. The Texas Hill Country features creeks, swimming holes, and tree-covered groves that make camping a more comfortable experience than the harsh high Nevada desert. Flipside is slightly more strict about the vending rule: the only thing sold is ice. The smaller size of the event creates a sense that one could meet everyone, as part of a temporary community that encompasses all the event participants. Almost every participant of Flipside, including the event's organizers, pay to get in regardless of how much time they put in volunteering. The only exceptions Austin Artistic Reconstruction makes are four free tickets: two to the designer of the sticker, and two to the designer of the ticket.

Additionally, unlike Burning Man where the central effigy of a glowing neon man stays essentially unaltered from year to year (with alteration to its base and other design elements), the Flipside effigy changes radically with each event. For example, participants built and burned a 6-armed, cowboy hat-wearing Hanuman effigy in 2004, a rocket ship at the 2005 event, and a chalice at the 2006 event.

== Event history ==
"Burning Man Texas" was held in June 1998 by George Paap. It had 30 attendees, and featured the burning of a straw man built on site. Burning Flipside (named by Melody Byrd in Prost's backyard) began in 1999.

From 1998 through 2005, the event was held at Recreation Plantation (30.118830°N 98.180544°W), a private campground in neighboring Dripping Springs, Texas. Having outgrown that space, the event moved to a larger property in 2006, Flat Creek Crossing (30.283342°N 98.205479°W). While this location allowed for potential future growth, the land is also more primitive, due to the presence of large cliffs, scorpions, mountain lions, and other hazards, some believe that the land is more dangerous than even the Black Rock Desert. In 2010, the event moved to Apache Passtures near San Gabriel, Texas and Rockdale, Texas. The endemic pecan trees offered shade and participant created trails provided access to the San Gabriel River, a larger body of water than was present at Flat Creek Crossing.

Year	Location	Theme	Effigy	Participants	Notes
1999	Recreation Plantation	Countdown to Armageddon	HA	>250	
2000	Recreation Plantation	Pyropolis	The City	300	
2001	Recreation Plantation	Home on the Strange	The Stranger	>500	
2002	Recreation Plantation	Down the Rabbit Hole	The Joker (House of Cards)	750	effigy dismantled and burned in Charlie Smith's art piece, Synapse Naust
2003	Recreation Plantation	Dreams of Chromatic Distraction	The Sandman	950	
2004	Recreation Plantation	Glitter Monkey Rodeo	Hanuman	1,200 (max. tickets)	The first year the event sold all available tickets pre-event.
2005	Recreation Plantation	Innergalactic Circus	Rocket	1,500 (max. tickets)	
2006	Flat Creek	Fall from Grace	Chalice	1,800 (max. tickets)	First year at Flat Creek
2007	Flat Creek	Symphony of Construction	The Conductor	2,007 (max. tickets)	
2008	Flat Creek	Dr Tiki's Combustible Medicine Show	The Hula Girl	2,345 (max. tickets)	
2009	Flat Creek	Freakalicious Safari	The Freak	2,468 (max. tickets)	Effigy did not burn at Flat Creek. Dismantled and relocated to North Texas for the burn at Myschievia.
2010	Apache Passtures	Post Apocalyptic Prom	The Texas Tango	2,469 (max. tickets)	First year at Apache Pastures (adjacent to Apache Pass River Theatre)
2011	Apache Passtures	Bad Idea	Burning Bridges	2,470 (max. tickets)	
2012	Apache Passtures	Freaky Deeky Time Machine	Time Machine	2,483 (max. tickets)	First year a sell-out of tickets spun off an event named Burning Otherside at Recreation Plantation
2013	Apache Passtures	The Bandersnatch Boobytrap	The Beast '013	2,557 (actual tickets past gate)	First year to receive permit for population over 2500 (limit imposed by Texas' Mass Gathering Act)
2014	Apache Passtures	By Lurko's Beard	The Lair of the Beard	2,982 (actual tickets past gate)	
2015	Apache Passtures	The Wizards Of Odd	Magical Thinking	2,852 (actual tickets past gate)	Colloquially referred to as "Floodside"
2016	Apache Passtures	No	We Wee Whee	2,547 (actual tickets past gate)	The number of tickets sold was reduced to reduce strain on the event volunteers following a very difficult year in 2015.
2017	Apache Passtures	Unicorns vs Rainbows: The Reckoning	Playwood Palace	2,870 (actual tickets past gate)	
2018	Apache Passtures	Return of the Shadows: 20 Years of Light and Dark	PINE Cononagon	2627 (actual tickets past gate)	
2019	Apache Passtures	Sisyphean Celebration	We'll Meet Again	2649 (actual tickets past gate)	
2020	Apache Passtures	Sacred and Propane	Stairway to Heaven	N/A	Cancelled due to COVID-19 & deferred to next year.
2021	Apache Passtures	N/A	N/A	N/A	Cancelled due to COVID-19 & deferred to next year.
2022	Apache Passtures	Sacred and Propane	Stairway to Heaven	2100 (approximate tickets past gate)	
2023	Apache Passtures	Demolition Disco Derby			
2024	Apache Passtures	Cosmic Critter Carnival			
2025	Apache Passtures	Deep in the Art of Texas	HeartRender		
2026	Apache Passtures	One of Us	All's Whale that Ends Whale	2650 (tickets past gate)	
