= Union Street, Plymouth =

Street in Plymouth, Devon

Coordinates: 50.370°N 4.153°W

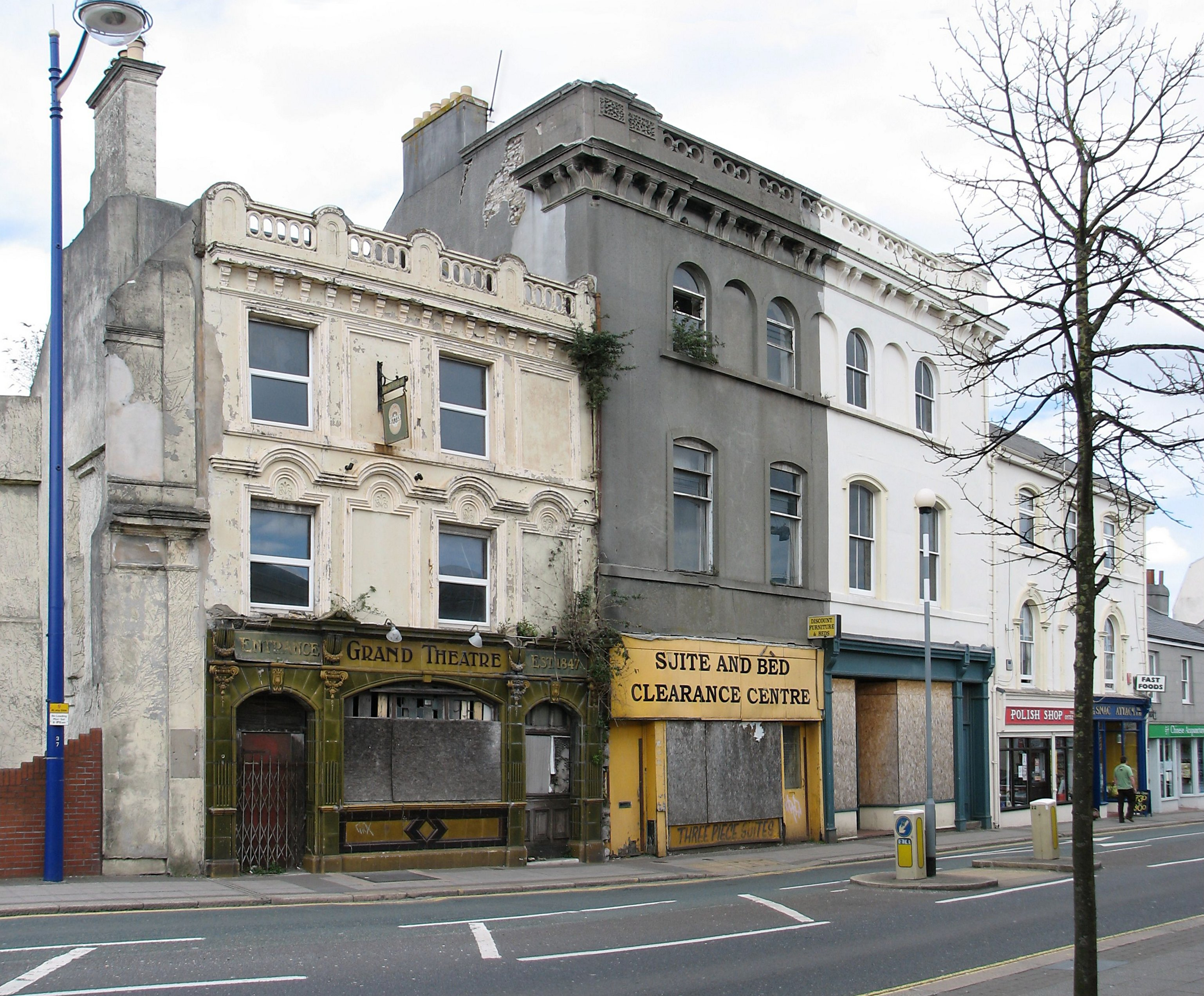
A closed public house and shops in Union Street in 2008

Union Street in Plymouth, Devon, is a long straight street connecting the city centre to Devonport, the site of Plymouth's naval base and docks. Originally the home of wealthy people, it later became an infamous red-light district and the location of most of the city's night-life.

== History ==
Designed by John Foulston, it was laid out between 1812 and 1820 as a grand boulevard to connect the three towns of Plymouth, East Stonehouse and Devonport. Today Union Street forms part of the A374.

For some years after its construction, Union Street was the home of the wealthy. According to a guidebook of 1823:

…the buildings are neat and handsome, and the streets straight and commodious, particularly those of Durnford-street, Emma-place, Edgcumbe-street and Union-street. These are almost entirely occupied by genteel families, chiefly those of naval and military officers, and other persons holding situations under government. The addition of Union-street … is an improvement of the greatest importance … [it] affords a spacious thoroughfare, and presents … a succession of neat and uniform buildings.

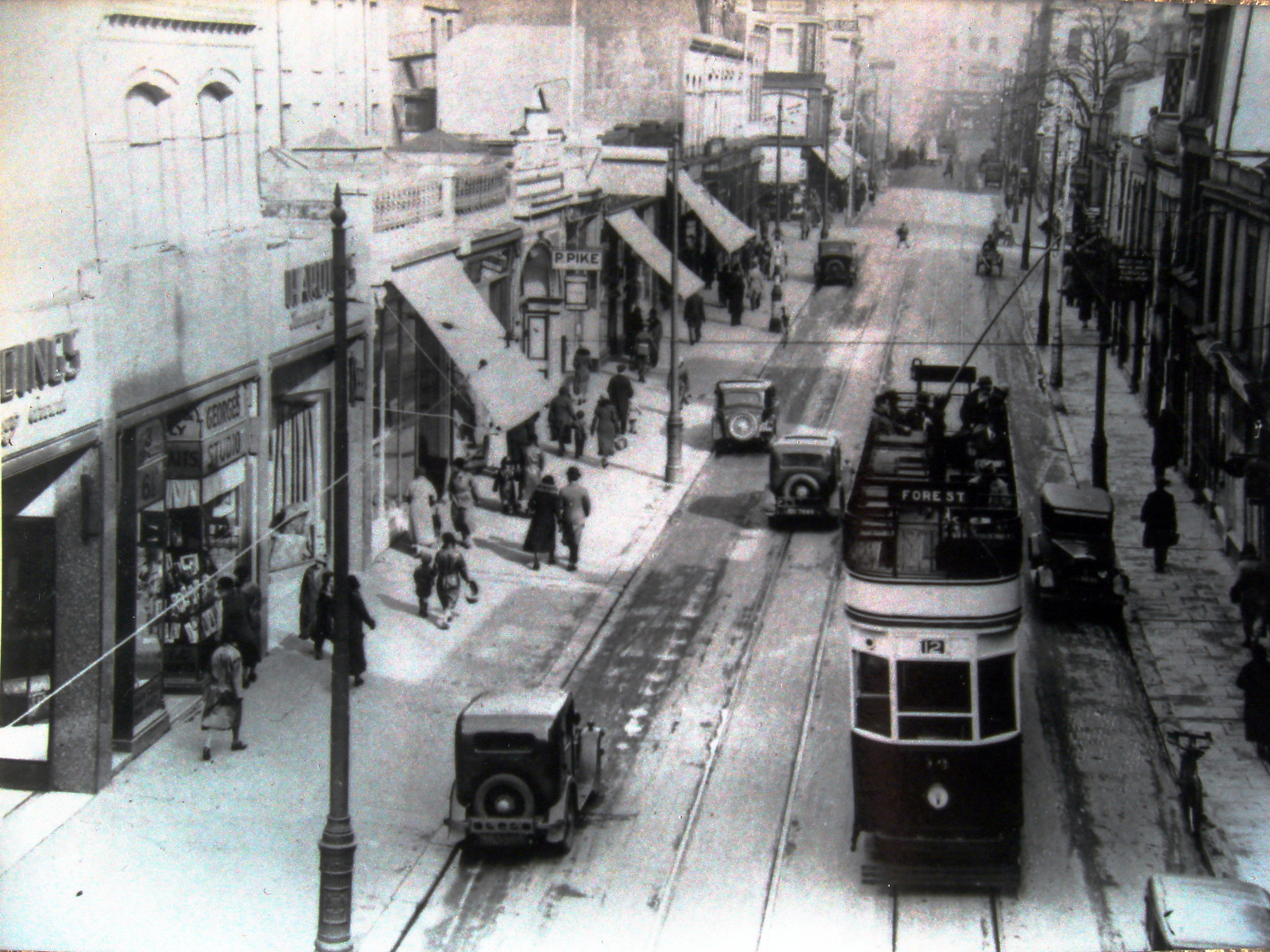
Union Street before World War Two shows trams

Despite its upper-class associations, Union Street was the location of the first outbreaks in Plymouth of cholera in the 1849 epidemic. At the time, these outbreaks in July of that year were believed to be caused by works connected with the new Millbay railway station, during which the drains of several houses had become blocked and their lower premises overflowed with sewage.

It was the continuing development along and around Union Street that led to the merger of the Three Towns in 1914, and the granting of Plymouth's city status in 1928.

Frequented by sailors from all over the world, it was once known as one of the West Country's most infamous streets and red-light districts. Much of the area was destroyed by German bombing in World War II, more by widening and slum clearance work.

== The Palace Theatre ==
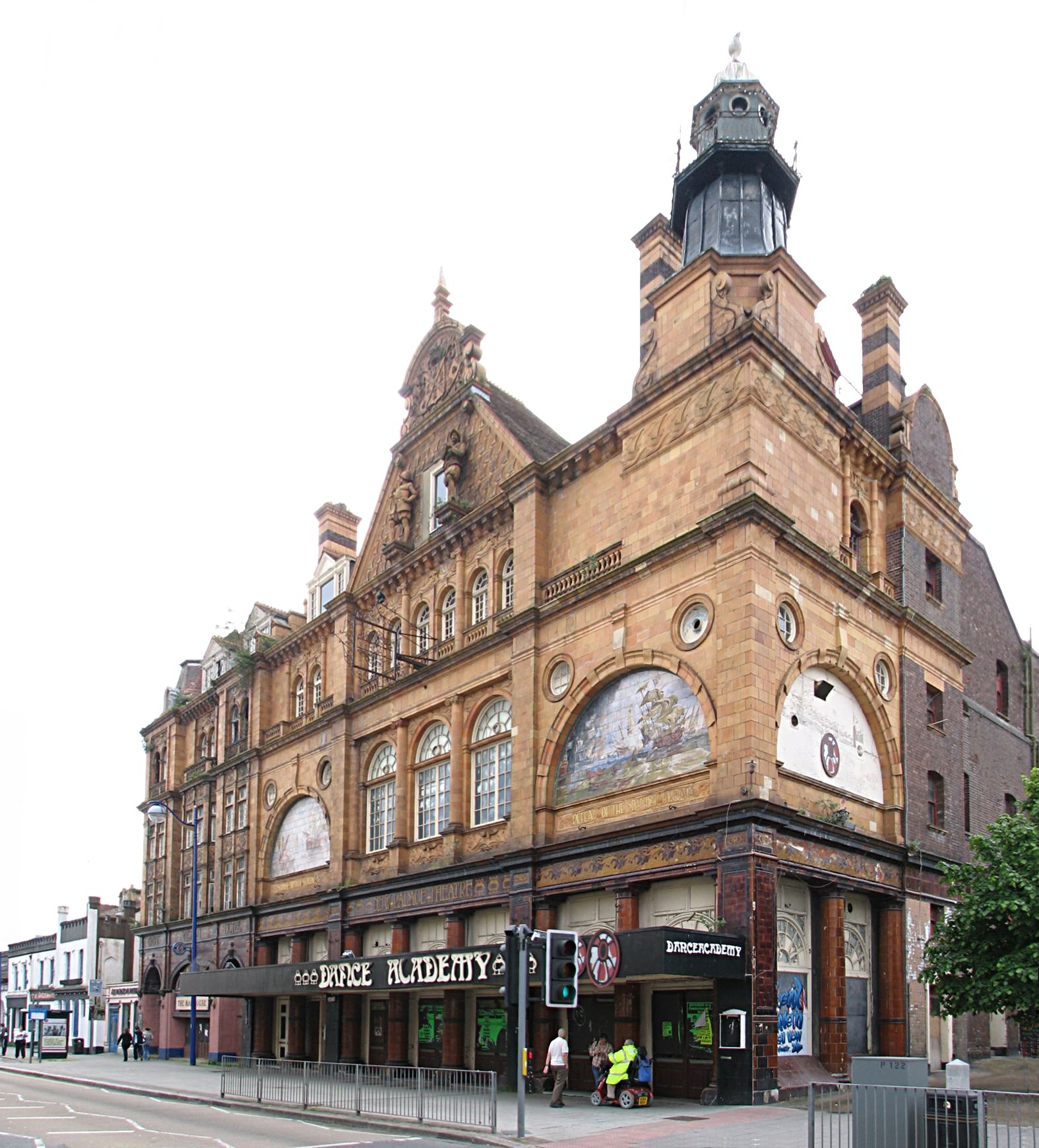
The New Palace Theatre in 2008.

In 1898 the Palace Theatre opened as a music hall in Union Street. It was damaged by fire only eight months after opening, but re-opened in 1899 as the New Palace Theatre of Varieties. In 1961 it was converted to a bingo hall and continued in this use and as a theatre until 1983 when it became "The Academy" disco.

In May 2006 a police operation showed that class A drugs were being used and dealt there, and it closed as a result. The building is grade II listed, and in 2008 it was included on a list by the Victorian Society of the UK's ten most endangered and best Victorian and Edwardian buildings.

== Present condition and future plan ==
The environment of Union Street - although designated as a local conservation area is now considerably dilapidated following the closure of the majority of the night leisure businesses in an attempt to control the associated problems of late-night violence and drunkenness. The broken and collapsed historic frontage has fallen into considerable disrepair and many of the businesses associated with servicing the nighttime economy are now vacant. Some limited new developments consist of new housing, low-cost supermarkets and a few remaining late night venues. Despite the conservation area status, modern developments have not attempted to respect the original historic urban design, with retail parking taking up much of the newer street frontage with higher profile developments more aligned with the aspirations of the Plymouth Plan which are focussed toward the development of links between the city centre and Millbay immediately to the south. It has a noticeable police presence late at night and early into the morning, to control drunk and lively people. As of 2002, it was also patrolled by military police to maintain a degree of integrity among sailors and marines, though it is less frequented by service personnel than it once was.

== In song ==
"Union Street (Last Post)" is a track on the 2006 album Witness by contemporary West Country folk duo Show of Hands. It tells a tale of love and loss amongst the pubs and clubs of Union Street at the time of the Falklands Conflict.
