= 2019–20 Plymouth Argyle F.C. season =

English football club season

Plymouth Argyle
2019–20 season
- Chairman: Simon Hallett
- Manager: Ryan Lowe
- Stadium: Home Park
- League Two: 3rd (promoted)
- FA Cup: Second round
- EFL Cup: Second round
- EFL Trophy: Group stage
- Top goalscorer: Antoni Sarcevic (10 goals)
- Highest home attendance: League: 15,062 (1 Jan 2020 v Swindon Town, EFL L2)
- Lowest home attendance: League: 9,061 (7 Sep 2019 v Oldham Athletic); All: 2,518 (3 Sep 2019 v Bristol Rovers, EFL Trophy Group Stage)
- Average home league attendance: 10,086
Home colours	Away colours	Third colours

The 2019–20 season was Plymouth Argyle's first season back in EFL League Two following relegation the season before and their 134th year in existence. Along with competing in League Two, the club will also participate in the FA Cup, EFL Cup and EFL Trophy. The season covers the period from 1 July 2019 to 30 June 2020.

On 13 March 2020 the season was temporarily suspended, before being indefinitely suspended on 3 April, due to the COVID-19 pandemic. On 15 May, League Two clubs declared their intention to end the season at its current point with immediate effect, with the final table being determined on an unweighted points-per-game basis. The decision meant that Plymouth Argyle, along with champions Swindon Town and Crewe Alexandra would be promoted to League One for the following season.

== First-team squad ==
As of 29 March 2020

No.	Name	Pos.	Nat.	Place of birth	Age	Apps	Goals	Signed from	Date signed	Fee	Ends
Goalkeepers
1	Michael Cooper	GK	(England)	Exeter	20	7	0	Academy	1 July 2017	Trainee	Undisclosed
24	Alex Palmer	GK	(England)	Kidderminster	23	41	0	West Bromwich Albion	16 July 2019	Loan	2019
Defenders
3	Gary Sawyer	LB	(England)	Bideford	34	293	6	Leyton Orient	25 June 2015	Free	2019
4	Will Aimson	CB/DM	(England)	Christchurch	26	7	2	Bury	2 July 2019	Free	Undisclosed
5	Scott Wootton	CB	(England)	Birkenhead	28	52	1	Milton Keynes Dons	1 July 2018	Free	Undisclosed
6	Niall Canavan	CB	(Republic of Ireland) (England)	Leeds	29	77	4	Rochdale	1 July 2018	Free	Undisclosed
25	Josh Grant	CB/DM	(England)	Brixton	21	29	0	Chelsea	10 January 2020	Loan	2020
Midfielders
7	Antoni Sarcevic	CM	(England)	Manchester	28	131	20	Shrewsbury Town	26 January 2017	Free	Undisclosed
8	Joe Edwards	CM/FB	(England)	Gloucester	29	40	3	Walsall	1 July 2019	Free	Undisclosed
10	Danny Mayor	LM	(England)	Leyland	29	39	1	Bury	1 July 2019	Free	Undisclosed
14	Tyreeq Bakinson	CM	(England)	Camden	21	14	2	Bristol City	3 January 2020	Loan	2020
15	Conor Grant	CM	(England)	Fazakerley	25	37	2	Everton	1 July 2018	Free	Undisclosed
17	Byron Moore	RW	(England)	Stoke-on-Trent	31	35	6	Bury	23 July 2019	Free	Undisclosed
20	Adam Randell	CM	(England)	Plymouth	19	9	0	Academy	1 July 2019	Trainee	Undisclosed
21	Callum McFadzean	LM	(Scotland) (England)	Sheffield	26	30	5	Bury	15 July 2019	Free	Undisclosed
32	George Cooper	AM	(England)	Warrington	23	31	3	Peterborough United	29 August 2019	Loan	2020
Forwards
9	Ryan Taylor	CF	(England)	Rotherham	32	98	13	Oxford United	30 January 2017	Free	Undisclosed
11	Dom Telford	CF	(England)	Burnley	23	23	3	Bury	11 July 2019	Undisclosed	Undisclosed
16	Joel Grant	LW/CF	(Jamaica)	Acton	32	86	15	Exeter City	1 July 2017	Free	Undisclosed
18	Ryan Hardie	CF	(Scotland)	Stranraer	23	13	7	Blackpool	9 January 2020	Loan	2020
19	Klaidi Lolos	CF	(Greece)	Athens	19	6	0	Academy	1 July 2019	Trainee	Undisclosed
31	Luke Jephcott	CF	(Wales) (England)	Ponsanooth	20	24	7	Academy	1 July 2018	Trainee	Undisclosed
Out on Loan
22	Tafari Moore	RB	(England) (Jamaica) (Barbados)	Kilburn	22	21	0	Arsenal	1 July 2018	Free	Undisclosed
29	Alex Fletcher	CF	(England)	Newton Abbot	21	25	3	Academy	22 June 2017	Trainee	Undisclosed

=== Statistics ===
As of game played on 7 March 2020

No.	Pos	Nat	Player	Total		League Two		FA Cup		League Cup		League Trophy	
No.	Pos	Nat	Player	Apps	Goals	Apps	Goals	Apps	Goals	Apps	Goals	Apps	Goals
1	GK	(England) ENG	Michael Cooper	4	0	0+0	0	0+0	0	2+0	0	2+0	0
3	DF	(England) ENG	Gary Sawyer	36	0	28+0	0	3+0	0	1+1	0	3+0	0
4	DF	(England) ENG	Will Aimson	7	2	5+0	2	0+0	0	0+0	0	2+0	0
5	DF	(England) ENG	Scott Wootton	42	1	34+1	1	3+0	0	1+0	0	2+1	0
6	DF	(Republic of Ireland) IRL	Niall Canavan	39	2	32+1	2	2+0	0	2+0	0	1+1	0
7	MF	(England) ENG	Antoni Sarcevic	37	11	29+2	10	3+0	1	0+0	0	3+0	0
8	MF	(England) ENG	Joe Edwards	40	3	31+3	3	3+0	0	2+0	0	1+0	0
9	FW	(England) ENG	Ryan Taylor	20	3	7+10	2	0+0	0	2+0	1	0+1	0
10	MF	(England) ENG	Danny Mayor	39	1	31+3	1	3+0	0	2+0	0	0+0	0
11	FW	(England) ENG	Dom Telford	23	3	7+12	2	1+2	0	1+0	1	0+0	0
14	MF	(England) ENG	Tyreeq Bakinson	14	2	12+2	2	0+0	0	0+0	0	0+0	0
15	MF	(England) ENG	Conor Grant	23	2	10+8	2	0+2	0	1+1	0	1+0	0
16	FW	(Jamaica) JAM	Joel Grant	29	5	14+10	4	3+0	0	0+0	0	1+1	1
17	MF	(England) ENG	Byron Moore	35	6	26+3	5	3+0	0	0+1	0	2+0	1
18	FW	(Scotland) SCO	Ryan Hardie	13	7	5+8	7	0+0	0	0+0	0	0+0	0
19	FW	(Greece) GRE	Klaidi Lolos	6	0	0+4	0	0+0	0	0+1	0	1+0	0
20	MF	(England) ENG	Adam Randell	8	0	0+4	0	0+0	0	0+1	0	2+1	0
21	MF	(Scotland) SCO	Callum McFadzean	30	5	24+1	3	2+0	1	2+0	1	1+0	0
24	GK	(England) ENG	Alex Palmer	41	0	37+0	0	3+0	0	0+0	0	1+0	0
25	DF	(England) ENG	Josh Grant	29	0	17+4	0	3+0	0	2+0	0	2+1	0
31	FW	(Wales) WAL	Luke Jephcott	14	7	13+1	7	0+0	0	0+0	0	0+0	0
32	MF	(England) ENG	George Cooper	31	3	21+6	3	1+1	0	0+0	0	2+0	0
33	FW	(England) ENG	Ruben Wilson	1	0	0+0	0	0+0	0	0+0	0	0+1	0
40	MF	(England) ENG	Jude Boyd	1	0	0+0	0	0+0	0	0+0	0	0+1	0
42	DF	(England) ENG	Jarvis Cleal	1	0	0+1	0	0+0	0	0+0	0	0+0	0
Players out loan:
22	DF	(England) ENG	Tafari Moore	3	0	0+1	0	0+0	0	1+0	0	1+0	0
Players who left the club:
2	DF	(England) ENG	Joe Riley	18	2	11+4	1	0+0	0	1+0	0	2+0	1
14	MF	(England) ENG	Jose Baxter	12	1	3+6	0	0+0	0	1+1	1	1+0	0
18	FW	(Republic of Ireland) IRL	Billy Clarke	12	0	2+7	0	0+2	0	0+0	0	1+0	0
39	FW	(Scotland) SCO	Zak Rudden	18	3	7+7	2	0+1	0	1+0	0	1+1	1

=== Goals record ===
As of 7 March 2020

Rank	No.	Nat.	Po.	Name	League Two	FA Cup	League Cup	League Trophy	Total
1	7	(England)	CM	Antoni Sarcevic	10	1	0	0	11
2	18	(Scotland)	CF	Ryan Hardie	7	0	0	0	7
2	31	(Wales)	CF	Luke Jephcott	7	0	0	0	7
4	17	(England)	RW	Byron Moore	5	0	0	1	6
5	16	(Jamaica)	CF	Joel Grant	4	0	0	1	5
5	21	(Scotland)	LM	Callum McFadzean	3	1	1	0	5
7	8	(England)	CM	Joe Edwards	3	0	0	0	3
7	9	(England)	CF	Ryan Taylor	2	0	1	0	3
7	11	(England)	CF	Dom Telford	2	0	1	0	3
7	32	(England)	AM	George Cooper	3	0	0	0	3
7	~~39~~	(Scotland)	CF	Zak Rudden	2	0	0	1	3
11	~~2~~	(England)	RB	Joe Riley	1	0	0	1	2
11	4	(England)	CB	Will Aimson	2	0	0	0	2
11	6	(Republic of Ireland)	CB	Niall Canavan	2	0	0	0	2
11	14	(England)	CM	Tyreeq Bakinson	2	0	0	0	2
11	15	(England)	CM	Conor Grant	2	0	0	0	2
16	5	(England)	CB	Scott Wootton	1	0	0	0	1
16	10	(England)	LM	Danny Mayor	1	0	0	0	1
16	~~14~~	(England) }	AM	Jose Baxter	0	0	1	0	1
Own Goals					2	0	0	0	2
Total					61	2	4	4	71

=== Disciplinary record ===
As of 7 March 2020

Rank	No.	Nat.	Po.	Name	League Two			FA Cup			League Cup			League Trophy			Total		
Rank	No.	Nat.	Po.	Name	Booked	(yellow card) (yellow-red card)	Sent off (straight red)	Booked	(yellow card) (yellow-red card)	Sent off (straight red)	Booked	(yellow card) (yellow-red card)	Sent off (straight red)	Booked	(yellow card) (yellow-red card)	Sent off (straight red)	Booked	(yellow card) (yellow-red card)	Sent off (straight red)
1	7	(England)	CM	Antoni Sarcevic	7	1	1	0	0	0	0	0	0	1	0	0	8	1	1
2	5	(England)	CB	Scott Wootton	8	0	0	0	0	0	0	0	0	0	0	0	8	0	0
3	3	(England)	LB	Gary Sawyer	5	0	2	0	0	0	0	0	0	0	0	0	5	0	2
3	8	(England)	CM	Joe Edwards	7	0	0	0	0	0	0	0	0	0	0	0	7	0	0
3	10	(England)	LM	Danny Mayor	7	0	0	0	0	0	0	0	0	0	0	0	7	0	0
6	6	(Republic of Ireland)	CB	Niall Canavan	4	0	0	0	0	0	0	0	0	0	0	0	4	0	0
6	21	(Scotland)	LM	Callum McFadzean	3	0	0	0	0	0	0	0	0	1	0	0	4	0	0
6	24	(England)	GK	Alex Palmer	4	0	0	0	0	0	0	0	0	0	0	0	4	0	0
6	25	(England)	CB	Josh Grant	2	0	0	1	0	0	1	0	0	0	0	0	4	0	0
6	32	(England)	AM	George Cooper	4	0	0	0	0	0	0	0	0	0	0	0	4	0	0
10	~~2~~	(England)	RB	Joe Riley	2	0	0	0	0	0	0	0	0	0	0	0	2	0	0
10	17	(England)	RW	Byron Moore	2	0	0	0	0	0	0	0	0	0	0	0	2	0	0
10	19	(Greece)	CF	Klaidi Lolos	2	0	0	0	0	0	0	0	0	0	0	0	2	0	0
10	~~39~~	(Scotland)	CF	Zak Rudden	1	0	0	0	0	0	0	0	0	1	0	0	2	0	0
14	1	(England)	GK	Michael Cooper	0	0	0	0	0	0	1	0	0	0	0	0	1	0	0
14	4	(England)	CB	Will Aimson	1	0	0	0	0	0	0	0	0	0	0	0	1	0	0
14	11	(England)	CF	Dom Telford	0	0	0	1	0	0	0	0	0	0	0	0	1	0	0
14	14	(England)	CM	Tyreeq Bakinson	1	0	0	0	0	0	0	0	0	0	0	0	1	0	0
14	15	(England)	CM	Conor Grant	1	0	0	0	0	0	0	0	0	0	0	0	1	0	0
14	18	(Scotland)	CF	Ryan Hardie	1	0	0	0	0	0	0	0	0	0	0	0	1	0	0
14	20	(England)	CM	Adam Randell	0	0	0	0	0	0	0	0	0	1	0	0	1	0	0
Total					61	1	3	2	0	0	2	0	0	4	0	0	70	1	3

== Transfers ==
=== Transfers in ===
Date	Position	Nationality	Name	From	Fee	Ref.
1 July 2019	CM	(England)	Joe Edwards	(England) Walsall	Free transfer	
1 July 2019	LM	(England)	Danny Mayor	(England) Bury	Free transfer	
2 July 2019	CB	(England)	Will Aimson	(England) Bury	Free transfer	
11 July 2019	CF	(England)	Dom Telford	(England) Bury	Undisclosed	
15 July 2019	LM	(Scotland)	Callum McFadzean	(England) Bury	Free transfer	
23 July 2019	RW	(England)	Byron Moore	(England) Bury	Free transfer	
25 July 2019	AM	(England)	Jose Baxter	(England) Oldham Athletic	Free transfer	

=== Loans in ===
Date from	Position	Nationality	Name	From	Date until	Ref.
16 July 2019	GK	(England)	Alex Palmer	(England) West Bromwich Albion	30 June 2020	
8 August 2019	CB	(England)	Josh Grant	(England) Chelsea	1 January 2020	
23 August 2019	CF	(Scotland)	Zak Rudden	(Scotland) Rangers	1 January 2020	
29 August 2019	LW	(England)	George Cooper	(England) Peterborough United	30 June 2020	
3 January 2019	CM	(England)	Tyreeq Bakinson	(England) Bristol City	30 June 2020	
9 January 2020	CF	(Scotland)	Ryan Hardie	(England) Blackpool	30 June 2020	
10 January 2020	CB	(England)	Josh Grant	(England) Chelsea	30 June 2020	

=== Loans out ===
Date from	Position	Nationality	Name	To	Date until	Ref.
18 July 2019	LB	(England)	Ryan Law	(England) Truro City	January 2020	
2 August 2019	RW	(Wales)	Luke Jephcott	(England) Truro City	30 August 2019	
2 August 2019	LB	(England)	Ashley Smith-Brown	(England) Oldham Athletic	31 January 2020	
29 August 2019	DM	(England)	Tom Purrington	(England) Dorchester Town	15 February 2020	
29 August 2019	LM	(England)	Cameron Sangster	(England) Dorchester Town		
3 September 2019	CF	(England)	Alex Fletcher	(England) Aldershot Town	3 October 2019	
1 November 2019	CF	(Greece)	Klaidi Lolos	(England) Dorchester Town	1 January 2020	
1 November 2019	CM	(England)	Michael Peck	(England) Dorchester Town	28 November 2019	
7 December 2019	CF	(England)	Alex Fletcher	(England) Tiverton Town	January 2020	
7 December 2019	CM	(England)	Michael Peck	(England) Tiverton Town	January 2020	
18 January 2020	RB	(England)	Tafari Moore	(England) Colchester United	30 June 2020	

=== Transfers out ===
Date	Position	Nationality	Name	To	Fee	Ref.
1 July 2019	RM	(England)	Lionel Ainsworth	(England) Dulwich Hamlet	Released	
1 July 2019	RM	(England)	Paul Anderson	(England) Northampton Town	Released	
1 July 2019	FW	(England)	Alex Battle	(England) Truro City	Released	
1 July 2019	CB	(England)	Jordan Bentley	(England) Tiverton Town	Semi-retirement	
1 July 2019	DF	(England)	Andrew Burn	Free agent	Released	
1 July 2019	LM	(Republic of Ireland)	Graham Carey	(Bulgaria) CSKA Sofia	Free transfer	
1 July 2019	CB	(England)	Ryan Edwards	(England) Blackpool	Free transfer	
1 July 2019	CM	(England)	David Fox	Free agent	Mutual consent	
1 July 2019	MF	(England)	Rio Garside	(England) Truro City	Released	
1 July 2019	FW	(England)	Aaron Goulty	(England) Bideford	Released	
1 July 2019	RB	(England)	Harry Hodges	(England) Bristol Rovers	Released	
1 July 2019	CF	(England)	Freddie Ladapo	(England) Rotherham United	£500,000	
1 July 2019	AM	(Portugal)	Rúben Lameiras	(Portugal) Famalicão	Free transfer	
1 July 2019	CM	(Scotland)	Jamie Ness	(Scotland) Dundee	Released	
1 July 2019	DM	(Northern Ireland)	Dan Rooney	(England) Truro City	Released	
14 July 2019	CB	(Cameroon)	Yann Songo'o	(England) Scunthorpe United	Free transfer	
16 July 2019	GK	(Wales)	Kyle Letheren	(England) Salford City	Free transfer	
17 August 2019	CF	(England)	Calum Dyson	Retired	Mutual consent	
1 November 2019	LM	(England)	Cameron Sangster	(England) Dorchester Town	Mutual consent	
14 November 2019	AM	(England)	Jose Baxter	(United States) Memphis 901	Mutual consent	
9 January 2020	AM	(Republic of Ireland)	Billy Clarke	(England) Grimsby Town	Free transfer	
23 January 2020	RB	(England)	Joe Riley	(England) Mansfield Town	Released	
31 January 2020	LB	(England)	Ashley Smith-Brown	Free agent	Released	

== Pre-season ==
Argyle confirmed their pre-season programme in June 2019.

9 July 2019 Friendly	Truro City	1–0	Plymouth Argyle	Truro
19:30 BST	Rooney 49'	Report		Stadium: Treyew Road; Attendance: 1,766; Referee: Mark Whaley

13 July 2019 Friendly	Plymouth Parkway	0–2	Plymouth Argyle	Plymouth
15:00 BST		Report	Grant 44' (pen.); Lolos 48'	Stadium: Bolitho Park; Attendance: 1,923

16 July 2019 Friendly	Torquay United	3–1	Plymouth Argyle	Torquay
19:30 BST	Little 9'; Reid 15'; Kalala 73'	Report	Lolos 4'	Stadium: Plainmoor; Attendance: 3,382; Referee: Marc Whaley

20 July 2019 Friendly	AFC Wimbledon	0–2	Plymouth Argyle	Cartagena, Spain
10:30 CEST		Report	Mayor 33'; Grant 40'	Stadium: La Manga Club Football Stadium

24 July 2019 Friendly	Buckland Athletic	3–9	Plymouth Argyle	Newton Abbot
19:30 BST	Bush 37'; Kane 42'; Cooper 71'	Report	Moore 2'; Purrington 8'; Jephcott 23', 38', 61'; Fletcher 56', 74', 90'; Burdon 86'	Stadium: Homers Heath; Referee: Scott Jackson

27 July 2019 Friendly	Plymouth Argyle	0–1	Bristol Rovers	Plymouth
15:00 BST		Report	Adeboyejo 83'	Stadium: Home Park; Attendance: 5,099; Referee: Brett Huxtable

30 July 2019 Friendly	Tavistock	0–0	Plymouth Argyle	Tavistock
19:30 BST		Report		Stadium: Langsford Park

== Competitions ==
=== League Two ===
==== League table ====
Pos	Team	Pld	W	D	L	GF	GA	GD	Pts	PPG	Promotion, qualification or relegation
1	Swindon Town (C, P)	36	21	6	9	62	39	+23	69	1.92	Promotion to EFL League One
2	Crewe Alexandra (P)	37	20	9	8	67	43	+24	69	1.86	Promotion to EFL League One
3	Plymouth Argyle (P)	37	20	8	9	61	39	+22	68	1.84	Promotion to EFL League One
4	Cheltenham Town	36	17	13	6	52	27	+25	64	1.78	Qualification for League Two play-offs (Note: Four teams play for one spot and promotion to EFL League One.)
5	Exeter City	37	18	11	8	53	43	+10	65	1.76	Qualification for League Two play-offs
6	Colchester United	37	15	13	9	52	37	+15	58	1.57	Qualification for League Two play-offs
7	Northampton Town (O, P)	37	17	7	13	54	40	+14	58	1.57	Qualification for League Two play-offs
8	Port Vale	37	14	15	8	50	44	+6	57	1.54	

Source: EFL Official Website
Rules for classification: 1) Points per game; 2) Goal difference; 3) Number of goals scored; 4) Head-to-head results; 5) Wins; 6) Away goals; 7) Penalty points (sec 9.5); 8) 12-point sending off offences
(C) Champions; (O) Play-off winners; (P) Promoted

==== Results summary ====
Overall								Home						Away					
Pld	W	D	L	GF	GA	GD	Pts	W	D	L	GF	GA	GD	W	D	L	GF	GA	GD
37	20	8	9	61	39	+22	68	12	5	2	38	16	+22	8	3	7	23	23	0

Last updated: 7 March 2020.
Source: BBC

==== Results by matchday ====
Matchday	1	2	3	4	5	6	7	8	9	10	11	12	13	14	15	16	17	18	19	20	21	22	23	24	25	26	27	28	29	30	31	32	33	34	35	36	37
Ground	A	H	A	H	H	A	H	A	A	H	A	H	A	H	H	A	A	H	A	H	A	H	H	A	A	H	A	H	H	A	A	H	A	H	A	H	H
Result	W	W	L	D	W	L	D	L	D	L	W	D	D	W	W	L	W	W	L	W	W	W	L	W	W	W	W	D	W	L	W	W	D	D	L	W	W
Position	1	1	5	6	2	6	8	11	12	14	12	12	11	8	8	10	11	8	9	8	8	7	9	6	5	4	3	4	3	4	4	4	4	4	5	3	3

Updated to match(es) played on 7 March 2020. Source: Statto.com
A = Away; H = Home; W = Win; D = Draw; L = Loss

==== Matches ====
On Thursday, 20 June 2019, the EFL League Two fixtures were revealed.

3 August 2019 1	Crewe Alexandra	0–3	Plymouth Argyle	Crewe
15:00 BST	Nolan (yellow card) 20'; Kirk (yellow card) 77'; Ng (yellow card) 90+6'	Report	McFadzean 4', 90+2'; Grant 26'; Edwards (yellow card) 36'; Wharton (yellow card) 57'; Sawyer (yellow card) 74'; Palmer (yellow card) 75'; Mayor (yellow card) 90+6'	Stadium: Gresty Road; Attendance: 5,273; Referee: Matt Donohue

10 August 2019 2	Plymouth Argyle	1–0	Colchester United	Plymouth
15:00 BST	Sarcevic (yellow card) 8' (goal) 57'	Report	Stevenson (yellow card) 27'	Stadium: Home Park; Attendance: 10,542; Referee: John Busby

17 August 2019 3	Newport County	1–0	Plymouth Argyle	Newport
15:00 BST	Labadie (yellow card) 63'; Howkins 81'; Matt (yellow card) 86'	Report		Stadium: Rodney Parade; Attendance: 5,048; Referee: Peter Wright

20 August 2019 4	Plymouth Argyle	2–2	Salford City	Plymouth
19:45 BST	Mayor 43'; Telford 89' (pen.); Lolos (yellow card) 90+4'	Report	Beesley 37'; Dieseruvwe (yellow card) 73'; Touray 79'; Towell (yellow card) 88'	Stadium: Home Park; Attendance: 11,405; Referee: Sam Purkiss

24 August 2019 5	Plymouth Argyle	3–0	Walsall	Plymouth
15:00 BST	Taylor 13', 89'; Sawyer (yellow card) 37'; Sarcevic 82' (red card) 85'	Report	Norman (yellow card) 65'; Liddle (yellow card) 77'; Scarr (yellow card) 80'; Hardy (yellow card) 90+2'	Stadium: Home Park; Attendance: 9,337; Referee: Josh Smith

31 August 2019 6	Northampton Town	3–1	Plymouth Argyle	Northampton
15:00 BST	Watson 7' (pen.); Williams 21', 41'; Warburton (yellow card) 47'; Bunney (yellow card) 76'; Goode (yellow card) 84'	Report	Riley 10'; Mayor (yellow card) 50'; Edwards (yellow card) 67'	Stadium: PTS Academy Stadium; Attendance: 5,535; Referee: Sebastian Stockbridge

7 September 2019 7	Plymouth Argyle	2–2	Oldham Athletic	Plymouth
15:00 BST	Riley (yellow card) 26'; Wootton 31' (yellow card) 70'; Grant (yellow card) 51'; Mayor (yellow card) 61'; Moore 74'	Report	Branger 27'; Maouche (yellow card) 39'; Sylla (yellow card) 45+4'; Iacovitti (yellow card) 77'; Wheater 77'; Morais (yellow card) 84'; Mills (yellow card) 90+5'	Stadium: Home Park; Attendance: 9,061; Referee: Will Finnie

14 September 2019 8	Port Vale	1–0	Plymouth Argyle	Burslem
15:00 BST	Gibbons (yellow card) 6'; Smith 76'	Report	Mayor (yellow card) 43'; Canavan (yellow card) 47'	Stadium: Vale Park; Attendance: 5,275; Referee: Marc Edwards

17 September 2019 9	Crawley Town	2–2	Plymouth Argyle	Crawley
19:45 BST	Grego-Cox 9'; Doherty (yellow card) 77'; Palmer 85' (pen.)	Report	Edwards 73', 79'	Stadium: Broadfield Stadium; Attendance: 2,501; Referee: David Rock

21 September 2019 10	Plymouth Argyle	0–2	Cheltenham Town	Plymouth
15:00 BST		Report	Doyle-Hayes (yellow card) 18'; Varney 40' (yellow card) 50'; Raglan (yellow card) 88'; Aimson 90+1' (o.g.)	Stadium: Home Park; Attendance: 8,956; Referee: Scott Oldham

28 September 2019 11	Mansfield Town	0–1	Plymouth Argyle	Mansfield
15:00 BST	Gordon (yellow card) 45+3'	Report	Grant 13'; Wootton (yellow card) 21'; Sawyer (yellow card) 30'; Aimson (yellow card) 44'; McFadzean (yellow card) 50'; Sarcevic (yellow card) 52'; Lolos (yellow card) 75'	Stadium: One Call Stadium; Attendance: 4,499; Referee: Anthony Backhouse

5 October 2019 12	Plymouth Argyle	2–2	Scunthorpe United	Plymouth
15:00 BST	Aimson 18', 76'	Report	Gilliead 7'; Eisa 90+3'	Stadium: Home Park; Attendance: 8,800; Referee: Andy Woolmer

12 October 2019 13	Swindon Town	1–1	Plymouth Argyle	Swindon
15:00 BST	Doyle 45+2' (yellow card) 89'; Grant (yellow card) 49'; Baudry (yellow card) 56'; Lyden (yellow card) 67'	Report	Riley (yellow card) 42'; Grant 76'; Canavan (yellow card) 79'; Mayor (yellow card) 84'	Stadium: County Ground; Attendance: 9,548; Referee: Rob Lewis

19 October 2019 14	Plymouth Argyle	2–0	Carlisle United	Plymouth
15:00 BST	Palmer (yellow card) 13'; Grant 22'; Rudden (yellow card) 29'; Edwards (yellow card) 41'; Sarcevic 90+2'	Report	Branthwaite (yellow card) 40'	Stadium: Home Park; Attendance: 8,446; Referee: Alan Young

22 October 2019 15	Plymouth Argyle	4–0	Leyton Orient	Plymouth
19:45 BST	Grant 14'; Rudden 17'; McFadzean 34'; Widdowson 45+2' (o.g.); Cooper (yellow card) 55'; Wootton (yellow card) 66'	Report		Stadium: Home Park; Attendance: 8,810; Referee: Craig Hicks

26 October 2019 16	Exeter City	4–0	Plymouth Argyle	Exeter
13:00 BST	Bowman (yellow card) 39'; Law 42' (pen.), 83'; Parkes 49' (yellow card) 77'; Williams 67'	Report	McFadzean (yellow card) 12'; Sarcevic (yellow card) 90+3'	Stadium: St James Park; Attendance: 7,924; Referee: Darren Drysdale

2 November 2019	Plymouth Argyle	v	Grimsby Town	Plymouth
15:00 GMT		Report		Stadium: Home Park
Note: Fixture was postponed due to structural damage to the roof of Home Park.

16 November 2019 17	Forest Green Rovers	0–1	Plymouth Argyle	Nailsworth
15:00 GMT	Kitching (yellow card) 30'; Bernard (yellow card) 45+6'	Report	Sarcevic 24'; Moore (yellow card) 31'; Edwards (yellow card) 83'; Palmer (yellow card) 90+5'	Stadium: The New Lawn; Attendance: 3,897; Referee: Sam Purkiss

23 November 2019 18	Plymouth Argyle	2–1	Bradford City	Plymouth
15:00 GMT	Moore 5'; Edwards 25'; McFadzean (yellow card) 55'; Mayor (yellow card) 85'; Palmer (yellow card) 90+4'	Report	Cooke (yellow card) 23'; Canavan 51' (o.g.)	Stadium: Home Park; Attendance: 9,645; Referee: Ollie Yates

7 December 2019 19	Cambridge United	1–0	Plymouth Argyle	Cambridge
15:00 GMT	Knoyle 18'; Taylor (yellow card) 50'; Lewis (yellow card) 57'; Carruthers (yellow card) 66'	Report	Canavan (yellow card) 33'; Edwards (yellow card) 43'	Stadium: Abbey Stadium; Attendance: 4,492; Referee: Michael Salisbury

14 December 2019 20	Plymouth Argyle	3–0	Morecambe	Plymouth
15:00 GMT	J. Grant (yellow card) 19'; Cooper 44'; Sarcevic 45+2' (pen.); C. Grant 90+1'	Report	Brewitt (yellow card) 9'; Sutton (red card) 42'	Stadium: Home Park; Attendance: 9,174; Referee: Brett Huxtable

20 December 2019	Macclesfield Town	v	Plymouth Argyle	Macclesfield
15:00 GMT				Stadium: Moss Rose
Note: The fixture was postponed by the EFL on 20 December due to Macclesfield being handed a zero capacity notice by the local Safety Advisory Group

26 December 2019 21	Cheltenham Town	0–1	Plymouth Argyle	Cheltenham
15:00 GMT		Report	Rudden 33'; Sawyer (yellow card) 45+2'	Stadium: Jonny-Rocks Stadium; Attendance: 5,192; Referee: Charles Breakspear

29 December 2019 22	Plymouth Argyle	2–1	Stevenage	Plymouth
15:00 GMT	Denton 23' (o.g.); Sarcevic (yellow card) 43'; Canavan (yellow card) 65' (goal) 90+6'	Report	Parrett (yellow card) 60'; List 60'; Nugent (yellow card) 88'; Taylor (yellow card) 90+5'	Stadium: Home Park; Attendance: 11,719; Referee: John Busby

1 January 2020 23	Plymouth Argyle	1–2	Swindon Town	Plymouth
15:00 GMT	Telford 22'; Edwards (yellow card) 45+2'	Report	Grant (yellow card) 15'; Hunt (yellow card) 25'; Jaiyesimi 35'; Lyden (yellow card) 48'; Doyle 77' (yellow card) 78'; Yates (yellow card) 79'	Stadium: Home Park; Attendance: 15,062; Referee: Kevin Johnson

4 January 2020 24	Scunthorpe United	1–3	Plymouth Argyle	Scunthorpe
15:00 GMT	Ntlhe (yellow card) 60' van Veen 65'	Report	Jephcott 12', 56'; Sarcevic (yellow card) 21'; Cooper (yellow card) 45+2'; Moore 50'	Stadium: Sands Venue Stadium; Attendance: 3,450; Referee: Paul Marsden

11 January 2020 25	Carlisle United	0–3	Plymouth Argyle	Carlisle
15:00 GMT	Hayden (yellow card) 84' (yellow-red card) 90+4'	Report	Jephcott 33', 49'; Bakinson (yellow card) 74'; Hardie 75'	Stadium: Brunton Park; Attendance: 4,212; Referee: Martin Coy

18 January 2020 26	Plymouth Argyle	3–1	Mansfield Town	Plymouth
15:00 GMT	Canavan 43'; Sarcevic 61' (pen.); Cooper (yellow card) 81'; Hardie 90+1'	Report	Hamilton (yellow card) 36'; Sweeney (yellow card) 54'; Cook 66'	Stadium: Home Park; Attendance: 10,523; Referee: Trevor Kettle

25 January 2020 27	Stevenage	1–2	Plymouth Argyle	Stevenage
15:00 GMT	Carter 89'	Report	Moore 47'; Hardie 85'; Wootton (yellow card) 90+11'	Stadium: The Lamex Stadium; Attendance: 3,627; Referee: Sam Purkiss

28 January 2020 28	Plymouth Argyle	2–2	Crawley Town	Plymouth
20:15 GMT	Sarcevic 44' (pen.); Wootton (yellow card) 78'; Jephcott 83'	Report	Palmer 27', 90+2'; Lubala (yellow card) 43'; Doherty (yellow card) 69'	Stadium: Home Park; Attendance: 9,184; Referee: Alan Young

1 February 2020 29	Plymouth Argyle	1–0	Newport County	Plymouth
15:00 GMT	Bakinson 5'; Hardie (yellow card) 79'; Sawyer (red card) 85'; Palmer (yellow card) 90+3'	Report	Labadie (yellow card) 85'; Matt (yellow card) 90+2'	Stadium: Home Park; Attendance: 10,956; Referee: Ollie Yates

8 February 2020 30	Colchester United	3–0	Plymouth Argyle	Colchester
15:00 GMT	Stevenson 14'; Robinson 30', 36'; Eastman (yellow card) 61'	Report	Cooper (yellow card) 39'	Stadium: JobServe Community Stadium; Attendance: 4,768; Referee: James Oldham

11 February 2020 31	Salford City	2–3	Plymouth Argyle	Salford
19:45 GMT	Baldwin (yellow card) 52'; Wilson 62', 69'	Report	Moore 19'; Mayor (yellow card) 54'; Sarcevic (yellow card) 54' (goal) 67'; Wootton (yellow card) 90+1'; Hardie 90+2'	Stadium: Peninsula; Attendance: 2,297; Referee: Paul Marsden

15 February 2020 32	Plymouth Argyle	2–1	Crewe Alexandra	Plymouth
15:00 GMT	Jephcott 57'; Sarcevic 71' (pen.)	Report	Pickering 52'; Offord (yellow card) 66'	Stadium: Home Park; Attendance: 11,567; Referee: Tom Nield

18 February 2020 33	Macclesfield Town	1–1	Plymouth Argyle	Macclesfield
19:45 GMT	Tracey 33'; Archibald (yellow card) 70'; O'Keeffe (yellow card) 85'; Horsfall (yellow card) 90+4'	Report	Sarcevic 84' (yellow card) 85'	Stadium: Moss Rose; Referee: Neil Hair

22 February 2020 34	Plymouth Argyle	0–0	Cambridge United	Plymouth
15:00 GMT	Sawyer (yellow card) 87'	Report	Carruthers (yellow card) 44'; Maris (yellow card) 80'	Stadium: Home Park; Attendance: 11,597; Referee: Will Finnie

29 February 2020 35	Bradford City	2–1	Plymouth Argyle	Bradford
15:00 GMT	Richards-Everton 6'; Connolly 45+2'; McCartan (yellow card) 50'	Report	Sawyer (red card) 40'; Moore (yellow card) 50'; Sarcevic (yellow card) 71' (yellow-red card) 84'; Hardie 87'	Stadium: The Utilita Energy Stadium; Referee: Carl Boyeson

3 March 2020 36	Plymouth Argyle	3–0	Grimsby Town	Plymouth
19:45 GMT	Bakinson 22'; Hardie 30'; Jephcott 40'; Grant (yellow card) 65'	Report	Clifton (yellow card) 57'	Stadium: Home Park; Attendance: 9,327; Referee: David Rock

7 March 2020 37	Plymouth Argyle	3–0	Macclesfield Town	Plymouth
15:00 GMT	Hardie 33'; Cooper 62', 77'	Report	Kirby (yellow card) 14'	Stadium: Home Park; Attendance: 12,310; Referee: Christopher Sarginson

14 March 2020	Morecambe	v	Plymouth Argyle	Morecambe
15:00 GMT				Stadium: Globe Arena
Note: Season was suspended until 3 April 2020, due to the COVID-19 pandemic.

17 March 2020	Leyton Orient	v	Plymouth Argyle	Leyton
19:45 GMT				Stadium: The Breyer Group Stadium
Note: Season was suspended until 3 April 2020, due to the COVID-19 pandemic.

23 March 2020	Plymouth Argyle	v	Exeter City	Plymouth
19:45 GMT				Stadium: Home Park
Note: Season was suspended until 3 April 2020, due to the COVID-19 pandemic.

28 March 2020	Grimsby Town	v	Plymouth Argyle	Cleethorpes
15:00 GMT				Stadium: Blundell Park
Note: Season was suspended until 3 April 2020, due to the COVID-19 pandemic.

4 April 2020	Plymouth Argyle	v	Forest Green Rovers	Plymouth
15:00 BST				Stadium: Home Park
Note: On 3 April, the English Football League decided to postpone all football until safe to do so due to the COVID-19 pandemic.

10 April 2020	Walsall	v	Plymouth Argyle	Bescot
15:00 BST				Stadium: Banks's Stadium
Note: On 3 April, the English Football League decided to postpone all football until safe to do so due to the COVID-19 pandemic.

13 April 2020	Plymouth Argyle	v	Northampton Town	Plymouth
13:00 BST				Stadium: Home Park
Note: On 3 April, the English Football League decided to postpone all football until safe to do so due to the COVID-19 pandemic.

18 April 2020	Oldham Athletic	v	Plymouth Argyle	Oldham
15:00 BST				Stadium: Boundary Park
Note: On 3 April, the English Football League decided to postpone all football until safe to do so due to the COVID-19 pandemic.

25 April 2020	Plymouth Argyle	v	Port Vale	Plymouth
15:00 BST				Stadium: Home Park
Note: On 3 April, the English Football League decided to postpone all football until safe to do so due to the COVID-19 pandemic.

=== FA Cup ===
The first round draw was made on 21 October 2019. The second round draw was made live on 11 November from Chichester City's stadium, Oaklands Park.

9 November 2019 First round	Bolton Wanderers	0–1	Plymouth Argyle	Horwich
15:00 GMT	Murphy (yellow card) 31'	Report	McFadzean 11'	Stadium: University of Bolton Stadium; Attendance: 6,992; Referee: Robert Lewis

1 December 2019 Second round	Bristol Rovers	1–1	Plymouth Argyle	Horfield
14:00 GMT	Upson (yellow card) 8'; Sercombe 74'; Clarke (yellow card) 81'; Kilgour (yellow card) 84'; Menayese (red card) 90+5'	Report	Grant (yellow card) 64'; Sarcevic 84' (pen.) (penalty missed) 90+6'; Telford (yellow card) 90+6'	Stadium: Memorial Stadium; Attendance: 6,215; Referee: Will Finnie

17 December 2019 Second round replay	Plymouth Argyle	0–1	Bristol Rovers	Plymouth
19:30 GMT		Report	Upson (yellow card) 60'; Rodman 68' (yellow card) 70'; Bennett (yellow card) 90+5'	Stadium: Home Park

=== EFL Cup ===
The first round draw was made on 20 June. The second round draw was made on 13 August 2019 following the conclusion of all but one first-round matches.

13 August 2019 First round	Plymouth Argyle	2–0	Leyton Orient	Plymouth
19:45 BST	McFadzean 59'; Telford 62'; Grant (yellow card) 84'	Report		Stadium: Home Park; Attendance: 5,573; Referee: Antony Coggins

27 August 2019 Second round	Plymouth Argyle	2–4	Reading	Plymouth
19:45 BST	Taylor 22'; Baxter 55'; Cooper (yellow card) 86'	Report	Adam (yellow card) 24'; Barrett 35', 72'; Méïté 87' (pen.), 90+1' (yellow card) 88'	Stadium: Home Park; Attendance: 8,365; Referee: Kevin Johnson

=== EFL Trophy ===
On 9 July 2019, the pre-determined group stage draw was announced with Invited clubs to be drawn on 12 July 2019.

Pos	Div	Team	Pld	W	PW	PL	L	GF	GA	GD	Pts	Qualification
1	L1	Bristol Rovers	3	2	0	1	0	4	2	+2	7	Advance to Round 2
2	ACA	Chelsea U21	3	2	0	0	1	5	4	+1	6	Advance to Round 2
3	L2	Plymouth Argyle	3	1	1	0	1	4	2	+2	5	
4	L2	Swindon Town	3	0	0	0	3	2	7	−5	0	

Source: EFL.com

3 September 2019 Group stage	Plymouth Argyle	1–1 (5–3 p)	Bristol Rovers	Plymouth
19:45 BST	Moore 40'	Report	Ogogo (yellow card) 14'; Nichols 30'	Stadium: Home Park; Attendance: 2,518; Referee: Keith Stroud
	Penalties
	Rudden (penalty scored); Randell (penalty scored); Lolos (penalty scored); Sarcevic (penalty scored); Cooper (penalty scored)		Bennett (penalty missed); Kelly (penalty scored); Craig (penalty scored); Adeboyejo (penalty scored)

8 October 2019 Group stage	Swindon Town	0–3	Plymouth Argyle	County Ground
19:45	Zakuani (yellow card) 26'	Report	Rudden 15' (yellow card) 45'; Grant 36'; Riley 66'	Referee: Chris Pollard

29 October 2019 Group stage	Plymouth Argyle	0–1	Chelsea U21	Plymouth
19:45 GMT	Randell (yellow card) 21'; Sarcevic (yellow card) 30'; McFadzean (yellow card) 90+1'	Report	Russell 90+3'	Stadium: Home Park; Attendance: 1,725; Referee: John Busby
