= Alex Battle =

English footballer

Personal information
- Full name: Alex Martin Jon Battle
- Date of birth: 23 January 1999 (age 27)
- Place of birth: Plymouth, England
- Height: 6 ft 0 in (1.82 m)
- Position: Forward

Team information
- Current team: Truro City (on loan from Crawley Town)

Youth career
- 2013–2017: Plymouth Argyle

Senior career*
Years	Team	Apps	(Gls)
2017–2019	Plymouth Argyle	1	(0)
2017	→ Salisbury (loan)	3	(0)
2019	→ Truro City (loan)	8	(1)
2019–2021	Truro City	26	(5)
2021–2022	Crawley Town	1	(0)
2021–2022	→ East Grinstead Town (loan)		
2022–	→ Truro City (loan)	17	(6)
2022–	→ Tavistock A.F.C.	73	(24)
- * Club domestic league appearances and goals as of 17:32, 1 February 2022 (UTC)

Alex Martin Jon Battle (born 23 January 1999) is an English professional footballer who plays as a forward for Tavistock. Battle previously appeared in the Football League for Plymouth Argyle and Crawley Town.

== Early life ==
Battle was born in Plymouth.

== Career ==
=== Plymouth Argyle ===
On 9 November 2017 Battle joined Southern Football League side Salisbury on a youth loan, but had his loan cut short when he was forced to return to Argyle just a month later for treatment on a knee injury that he sustained during a 4–3 defeat to Larkhall Athletic. Battle made his EFL League One debut for Argyle as a substitute in a 5–2 defeat away to Gillingham on 5 May 2018, the last day of the 2017–18 season. Battle was sent on in the 79th minute for Jamaican international Joel Grant. Battle was one of five academy players on the bench for Argyle that game, alongside Cameron Sangster, Klaidi Lolos, Ryan Law and Dan Rooney.

On 17 July 2018, it was reported that Battle had turned down an offer of an extended contract from Argyle, and was training with Bolton Wanderers, a club he had trained with previously. However, with Bolton already in a dispute with their current players over unpaid wages, the Trotters were unable to agree a youth compensation fee with Argyle. On 23 July 2018 it was reported that Battle had agreed a professional contract with Plymouth Argyle.

=== Truro City ===
On 4 January 2019, Battle joined National League South side Truro City on loan until the end of the season, joining up with Jordan Bentley and Dan Rooney, two fellow Argyle loanees. He was released by Plymouth Argyle at the end of the 2018–19 season. In September 2019, he joined Truro City on a permanent deal. In May 2020, his contract at the club was extended for the 2020–21 season.

=== Crawley Town ===
On 4 September 2021, Battle signed for EFL League Two club Crawley Town on a one-year deal with the option for a further year following a trial at the club. He made his debut for the club later that day as a substitute in a 1–0 defeat away to Bristol Rovers. On 3 December 2021, Battle joined Isthmian League South East Division side East Grinstead Town on a 28-day loan deal. His loan was later extended to 29 January. On 1 February 2022, Battle rejoined former club Truro City on loan for the remainder of the 2021–22 season.

== Career statistics ==
As of match played 4 September 2021

Appearances and goals by club, season and competition
Club	Season	League			FA Cup		EFL Cup		Other		Total	
Club	Season	Division	Apps	Goals	Apps	Goals	Apps	Goals	Apps	Goals	Apps	Goals
Plymouth Argyle	2017–18	EFL League One	1	0	0	0	0	0	0	0	1	0
Plymouth Argyle	2018–19	EFL League One	0	0	0	0	0	0	1 (Note: Appearance(s) in EFL Trophy)	0	1	0
Plymouth Argyle	Total		1	0	0	0	0	0	1	0	2	0
Salisbury (loan)	2017–18	Southern League West Division	3	0	0	0	—		2 (Note: 1 appearance in Southern League Cup, 1 appearance in Wiltshire Senior Cup)	0	5	0
Truro City (loan)	2018–19	National League South	8	1	0	0	—		1 (Note: Appearance(s) in FA Trophy)	0	9	1
Truro City	2019–20	Southern League Premier Division South	18	3	0	0	—		4 (Note: 2 appearances in FA Trophy, 2 appearances and 1 goal in Southern League Cup)	1	22	4
Truro City	2020–21	Southern League Premier Division South	8	2	4	2	—		2	1	14	5
Truro City	Total		26	5	4	2	0	0	6	2	36	9
Crawley Town	2021–22	EFL League Two	1	0	0	0	0	0	0	0	1	0
Total			39	6	4	2	0	0	10	2	53	10
