= Joel Grant =

Footballer (born 1987)

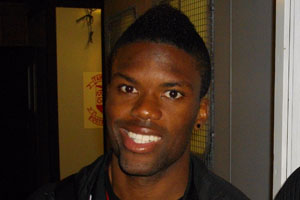
- Grant in 2010

Personal information
- Full name: Joel Valentino Grant
- Date of birth: 26 August 1987 (age 39)
- Place of birth: Acton, England
- Height: 6 ft 0 in (1.83 m)
- Positions: Winger; forward

Youth career
- ?–2005: Watford

Senior career*
Years	Team	Apps	(Gls)
2005–2007	Watford	7	(0)
2006–2007	→ Aldershot Town (loan)	14	(2)
2007–2008	Aldershot Town	30	(4)
2008–2011	Crewe Alexandra	96	(16)
2011–2013	Wycombe Wanderers	71	(14)
2013–2015	Yeovil Town	55	(6)
2015–2017	Exeter City	46	(8)
2017–2020	Plymouth Argyle	74	(14)
2020–2021	Swindon Town	20	(2)
2021–2022	Grimsby Town	1	(0)
2022–2023	Nantwich Town	15	(4)
Total		429	(70)

International career
2006–2007	Jamaica U20	11	(7)
2014–2016	Jamaica	14	(2)
Medal record
Men's football
Representing Jamaica
CONCACAF Gold Cup
Runner-up	2015 United States–Canada	Team
- * Club domestic league appearances and goals

Joel Valentino Grant (born 26 August 1987) is a former professional footballer who played as a winger.

Beginning his career with Watford he made seven league appearances as well as spending time on loan with Aldershot Town, he later played for Crewe Alexandra, Wycombe Wanderers, Yeovil Town, Exeter City, Plymouth Argyle, Swindon Town and Grimsby Town. He is a former Jamaican international. He can either play as a winger, midfielder or striker. He has performed as a traditional winger for most of his career, despite the rise of inside forwards in the past decade.

== Club career ==
=== Watford ===
Born in Acton, London, Grant started his career at Watford. He made his first team debut whilst still a member of Watford's Academy, coming on as a substitute in a League Cup match against Notts County on 23 August 2005. Whilst still an Academy scholar, he made nine more appearances for the club, including three starts.

Grant was rewarded with a professional contract by Watford prior to the 2006–07 season. On 31 August 2006, he joined Aldershot Town on a four-month loan, to gain experience. During his time with the Shots, he made 19 league and cup appearances, scoring 4 goals.

Grant was unable to break into the Watford side during their 2006–07 Premiership campaign and he was released at the end of the season.

=== Aldershot Town ===
In September 2007 he rejoined Aldershot Town on non-contract terms. In December 2007 he signed a contract until the end of the season. He made 30 league appearances, scoring four times, as Aldershot Town were promoted from the Conference.

=== Crewe Alexandra ===
On 25 June 2008, Grant joined Crewe Alexandra for £130,000, signing a three-year contract. The fee represented a club record sale for Aldershot Town. Grant scored his first goal for Crewe with a marvellous run and step over in the 2–1 win over Walsall at Gresty Road. The goal was shown as the Big Skill on Big League Weekend 2 on Sky Sports due to the step over. In 2009–10, Grant had a productive second season at Crewe, contributing nine goals and several assists marshalling the left wing.

He was released from the club in May 2011, having been limited to 28 appearances in the 2010–11 campaign.

=== Wycombe Wanderers ===
Grant signed for Wycombe Wanderers on 27 May 2011 on a free transfer.

=== Yeovil Town ===
Grant signed a two-year deal with Championship side Yeovil Town on 26 June 2013. Grant made his debut for Yeovil in their Football League Cup first round victory over Southend United, on 6 August 2013.

Grant was released at the end of the 2014–15 season following Yeovil's relegation to League Two.

=== Exeter City ===
On 21 August 2015, Grant joined Exeter City as the 1931 fan-funded player.

=== Plymouth Argyle ===
At the end of the 2016–17 season, Grant turned down the offer of a new contract with Exeter, to sign for their Devon rivals Plymouth Argyle. Grant operated as a traditional winger for most of his first season in the team. With manager Derek Adams opting for 4-2-3-1 and 4-3-3 formations for the first half of the 2017–18 season, Grant featured heavily but, once Adams switched to 4-3-2-1 and deployed Graham Carey and Ruben Lameiras as inside forwards, Grant lost favour and was only involved as a defensive substitute or a backup striker. To counteract this, he evolved tactically in the following 2018–19 season and began to exhibit traits more associated with inside forwards than traditional wingers. Consequently, the rates at which he completed dribbles, created chances and scored goals increased.

He was offered a new contract by Plymouth Argyle at the end of the 2018–19 season. He signed a new contract in June 2019. In October 2019 he scored in his third game in a row, and was praised by manager Ryan Lowe.

=== Swindon Town ===
On 19 September 2020, Grant joined Swindon Town on a one-year deal following a successful trial On 14 May 2021, it was announced that he would leave Swindon at the end of the season, following the expiry of his contract.

=== Grimsby Town ===
In July 2021, Grant joined National League side Grimsby Town following his release from Swindon.

Following an injury setback, Grant eventually made his debut on 6 November 2021 in an FA Cup tie away at Kidderminster Harriers.

On 16 February 2022, manager Paul Hurst commented that Grant was available for loan following a difficult period blighted by injury. "There hasn't been any interest, I am surprised when there is an experienced player with his record, prior to this season. At the minute, the phone has been quiet on that one. I think the injuries have been a major part of it (his struggles). He has been training for a couple of months but when he came in he wasn't up to speed. He had a setback and from then it's been a struggle really. Sometimes things that look good don't work out. You have to say, if we're being honest, that's how it looks as we speak. That's one that hasn't gone to plan."

On 8 April 2022, Grant was released by mutual consent, he had only made two substitute appearances for The Mariners during the season.

=== Nantwich Town ===
Ahead of the 2022–23 season, Grant signed for non-league team Nantwich Town, scoring on his debut in a friendly against Wrexham. In November 2022, whilst on the books at Nantwich Town, Grant was involved in a serious car crash which effectively stopped him playing football.

== International career ==
In June 2006 Grant earned a call-up to the Jamaica under-23 squad to play in the Central American and Caribbean Games taking place in Colombia between 15 and 29 July. He spent much of February 2007 with the squad for the CONCACAF under-20 World Cup qualifiers.

In May 2014 Grant was called up to the Jamaica senior squad, and made his full international début playing for 78 minutes against Serbia on 26 May. He scored his first goal at the senior level in a 2–2 draw with Egypt on 4 June 2014 at Leyton, England.

On 2 June 2016, Grant was called up to the Jamaica squad for the Copa América Centenario as a replacement for the injured Simon Dawkins.

== Outside football ==
Following his retirement from football, Grant retrained as a barber and obtained a Level 3 Diploma from Stoke-on-Trent College.

== Career statistics ==
=== Club ===
As of match played 1 May 2021

Appearances and goals by club, season and competition
Club	Season	League			FA Cup		League Cup		Other		Total	
Club	Season	Division	Apps	Goals	Apps	Goals	Apps	Goals	Apps	Goals	Apps	Goals
Watford	2005–06	Championship	7	0	0	0	3	0	—		10	0
Watford	2006–07	Premier League	0	0	0	0	0	0	—		0	0
Watford	Total		7	0	0	0	3	0	—		10	0
Aldershot Town (loan)	2006–07	Conference Premier	14	2	4	2	—		1 (Note: Appearance in FA Trophy)	0	19	4
Aldershot Town	2007–08	Conference Premier	30	4	2	0	—		10 (Note: Five appearances in FA Trophy, five appearances and two goals in Conference League Cup)	2	42	6
Aldershot Town	Total		44	6	6	2	—		11	2	61	10
Crewe Alexandra	2008–09	League One	28	2	1	0	3	0	0	0	32	2
Crewe Alexandra	2009–10	League Two	43	9	1	1	1	0	1 (Note: Appearance in Football League Trophy)	0	46	10
Crewe Alexandra	2010–11	League Two	25	5	1	0	1	0	1	1	28	6
Crewe Alexandra	Total		96	16	3	1	5	0	2	1	106	18
Wycombe Wanderers	2011–12	League One	30	4	1	0	2	1	0	0	33	5
Wycombe Wanderers	2012–13	League Two	41	10	1	0	1	0	1	1	44	11
Wycombe Wanderers	Total		71	14	2	0	3	1	1	1	77	16
Yeovil Town	2013–14	Championship	34	3	2	1	2	0	—		38	4
Yeovil Town	2014–15	League One	20	3	0	0	0	0	0	0	20	3
Yeovil Town	Total		54	6	2	1	2	0	0	0	58	7
Exeter City	2015–16	League Two	26	4	3	0	1	0	1	0	31	4
Exeter City	2016–17	League Two	20	4	1	0	1	0	6 (Note: Three appearances in EFL Trophy, three appearances and one goal in League Two play-offs)	1	28	5
Exeter City	Total		46	8	4	0	2	0	7	1	59	9
Plymouth Argyle	2017–18	League One	33	6	2	0	0	0	0	0	35	6
Plymouth Argyle	2018–19	League One	17	4	2	0	1	0	2 (Note: Appearance(s) in EFL Trophy)	0	22	4
Plymouth Argyle	2019–20	League Two	24	4	3	0	0	0	2	1	29	5
Plymouth Argyle	Total		74	14	7	0	1	0	4	1	86	15
Swindon Town	2020–21	League One	20	2	1	0	0	0	1	0	22	2
Grimsby Town	2021–22	National League	1	0	1	0	—		0	0	2	0
Career total			412	66	25	4	16	1	26	6	479	77

=== International ===
As of match played 27 May 2016.

Appearances and goals by national team and year
National team	Year	Apps	Goals
Jamaica	2014	8	1
Jamaica	2015	5	0
Jamaica	2016	1	1
Total		14	2

=== International goals ===
As of match played 27 May 2016. Jamaica score listed first, score column indicates score after each Grant goal.

International goals by date, venue, cap, opponent, score, result and competition
No.	Date	Venue	Cap	Opponent	Score	Result	Competition	Ref
1	4 June 2014	Brisbane Road, London, England	3	Egypt	2–1	2–2	Friendly	
2	27 May 2016	Estadio Sausalito, Viña del Mar, Chile	14	Chile	2–1	2–1	Friendly	

== Honours ==
Aldershot Town

- Conference Premier: 2008
- Conference League Cup: 2008

Jamaica

- Caribbean Cup: 2014
