= Antoni Sarcevic =

English footballer (born 1992)

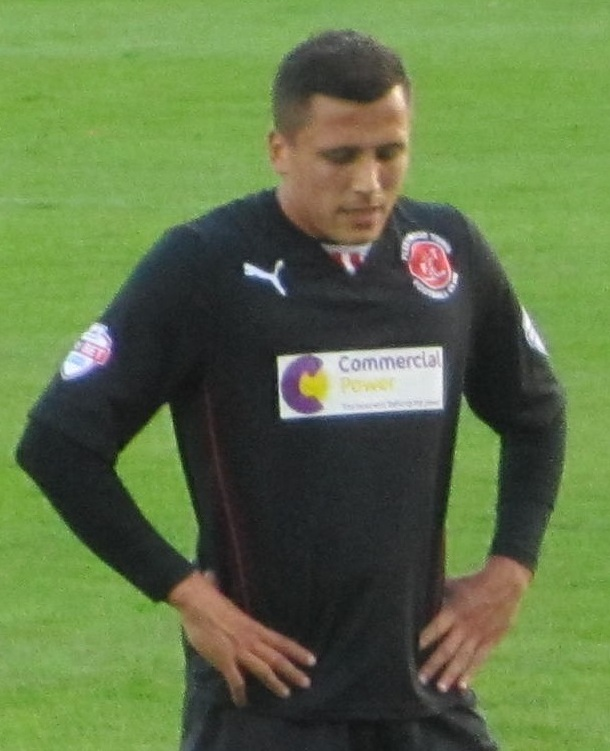
- Sarcevic with Fleetwood Town in 2013

Personal information
- Full name: Antoni Charles Sarcevic
- Date of birth: 13 March 1992 (age 34)
- Place of birth: Manchester, England
- Height: 6 ft 1 in (1.85 m)
- Position: Midfielder

Team information
- Current team: Bradford City
- Number: 10

Youth career
- 2000–2008: Manchester City
- 2008–2009: Woodley Sports

Senior career*
| Years | Team | Apps | (Gls) |
| 2009–2010 | Woodley Sports | 37 | (7) |
| 2010–2011 | Crewe Alexandra | 12 | (1) |
| 2010 | → Chester (loan) | 4 | (0) |
| 2011–2013 | Chester | 60 | (15) |
| 2013–2016 | Fleetwood Town | 118 | (18) |
| 2016 | Shrewsbury Town | 12 | (0) |
| 2017–2020 | Plymouth Argyle | 116 | (18) |
| 2020–2021 | Bolton Wanderers | 46 | (10) |
| 2021–2024 | Stockport County | 86 | (16) |
| 2024– | Bradford City | 76 | (20) |

International career
| 2013 | England C | 1 | (1) |
- * Club domestic league appearances and goals as of 21 November 2026

Antoni Charles Sarcevic (born 13 March 1992) is an English professional footballer who plays as a midfielder for EFL League One side Bradford City.

After being released by Manchester City, Sarcevic began his senior career with Woodley Sports, where he spent only one season before joining Crewe Alexandra, but struggled to break into the first team and went on loan to Chester in 2010, before making a permanent transfer to them in the next year, but moved to League Two side Fleetwood Town in June 2013 for an undisclosed fee. He scored 15 league goals for Fleetwood in 2013–14, he also topped the club's assist charts with nine, and was named in the League Two PFA Team of the Year after his performances for Fleetwood. In January 2017, Sarcevic joined Plymouth Argyle on a free transfer. He has been promoted eight times in his career.

== Club career ==
Born in Manchester, Sarcevic was in the youth system of boyhood club Manchester City aged seven to 15, before joining the youth system at Woodley Sports in 2008. He made his first team debut for Woodley in August 2009 and was offered a trial with Premier League club Blackburn Rovers during the 2009–10 season.

=== Crewe Alexandra ===
Sarcevic was signed by League Two side Crewe Alexandra for an undisclosed fee in May 2010, on a one-year contract with an option to extend for a further year. He was loaned out to Northern Premier League Division One North club Chester in October 2010. After two goals in seven appearances he was recalled to Crewe by Dario Gradi. Impressive in his loan spell, he scored on his Crewe debut on 1 February 2011, the last goal of a 6–2 defeat to Northampton Town.

=== Chester ===
On 23 November 2011 he returned to Chester as a permanent signing. During his first two seasons with Chester, they were promoted twice to the Football Conference, in the process winning the Northern Premier League Premier Division, Peter Swales Shield, Conference North and Cheshire Senior Cup. After impressive performances for Chester Sarcevic reportedly attracted interest from football league clubs and won a call up to the England C.

=== Fleetwood Town ===
On 26 June 2013 Fleetwood Town signed Antoni Sarcevic for an undisclosed fee. He made his debut for the club as Fleetwood Town beat Dagenham & Redbridge 3–1. On 23 November Sarcevic scored his first Football League hat-trick in the 5–4 home victory against Mansfield Town 5–4. His 15th goal of the season was a 75th-minute free-kick in the play-off final against Burton Albion on 26 May, which won promotion to League One.

=== Shrewsbury Town ===
At the end of his contract at Fleetwood, Sarcevic joined fellow League One side Shrewsbury Town on a free transfer in May 2016, signing a two-year deal. He left the club on 9 December 2016, by a mutual consent after agreeing to cancel his contract.

=== Plymouth Argyle ===
On 26 January 2017, Sarcevic joined League 2 side Plymouth Argyle on a free transfer. Sarcevic scored on his first start for Plymouth to earn them victory at Cambridge United on 4 February 2017. Due to his passion and consistent performances in the side he has earned the nickname 'Manchester Messi' from the green army.

=== Bolton Wanderers ===
On 15 July 2020, Sarcevic joined League Two side Bolton Wanderers, signing a two-year deal. On 29 August, the club announced that Sarcevic has been named club captain for the forthcoming season. He scored on his competitive debut on 5 September, scoring the equaliser in Bolton's first match of the season, a 1–2 home defeat against Bradford in the first round of the EFL Cup. "Sarce" (as he has been called in Bolton) led the team to a 4–1 victory over Crawley Town on 8 May which secured promotion to League One for the 2021–22 season. After Bolton had a poor run of form in October 2021, Sarcevic was dropped to the bench. It was reported that this caused an argument with manager Ian Evatt with both considering their relationship to be irreparable as a result. This apparently caused Sarcevic to accept a move to Stockport County. In May 2024, Sarcevic confirmed there was a falling out and that he felt he was treated unfairly by Evatt and thought there was no reason for why he was being treated as he was.

=== Stockport County ===
On 22 October 2021, Sarcevic joined National League side Stockport County on a free transfer, with the midfielder signing a contract until 2024. Sarcevic made his league debut for the club a day later on 23 October, coming on as a second-half substitute in a 2–1 loss against Notts County. He was a member of the Stockport side that won the League Two title in 2023–24, making 37 appearances and scoring 8 times. On 16 May 2024, Stockport County announced Sarcevic was leaving the club at the end of his deal.

=== Bradford City ===
On 17 May 2024, Bradford announced Sarcevic joined them on a two-year deal, re-joining his former manager at Fleetwood Graham Alexander. Following a four-month injury lay-off, his return to the side coincided with a significant upturn in form, three goals in five games seeing him named EFL League Two Player of the Month for February 2025. On 3 May 2025 in the last game of the season against his former club Fleetwood Town, Sarcevic scored the winning goal in the sixth minute of stoppage time to secure Bradford's promotion to League One for the 2025-26 season. This was the eighth promotion of his career.

At the end of the 2025–26 season he triggered a clause in his contract to remain with the club for a further year.

== International career ==
Antoni was called up to England C for the first to face Bermuda in a friendly on 5 May 2013. He scored the first goal in the game.

== Personal life ==
He is of Italian and Serbian descent.

== Career statistics ==
As of match played 7 March 2026

Appearances and goals by club, season and competition
| Club | Season | League | | | FA Cup | | League Cup | | Other | | Total | |
| Club | Season | Division | Apps | Goals | Apps | Goals | Apps | Goals | Apps | Goals | Apps | Goals |
|---|---|---|---|---|---|---|---|---|---|---|---|---|
| Woodley Sports | 2009–10 | NPL Division One North | 37 | 7 | ? | ? | — | | ? | ? | 37+ | 7+ |
| Crewe Alexandra | 2010–11 | League Two | 6 | 1 | 0 | 0 | 0 | 0 | 0 | 0 | 6 | 1 |
| Crewe Alexandra | 2011–12 | League Two | 6 | 0 | 1 | 0 | 0 | 0 | 3 (Note: Appearance(s) in Football League Trophy) | 0 | 10 | 0 |
| Crewe Alexandra | Total | | 12 | 1 | 1 | 0 | 0 | 0 | 3 | 0 | 16 | 1 |
| Chester (loan) | 2010–11 | NPL Division One North | 4 | 0 | 0 | 0 | — | | 3 (Note: Two appearances and two goals in NPL President's Cup, one appearance in Cheshire Senior Cup) | 2 | 7 | 2 |
| Chester | 2011–12 | NPL Premier Division | 23 | 3 | 0 | 0 | — | | 3 (Note: Appearances in FA Trophy) | 1 | 26 | 4 |
| Chester | 2012–13 | Conference North | 37 | 12 | 4 | 1 | — | | 6 (Note: Two appearances in FA Trophy, four appearances and four goals in Cheshire Senior Cup) | 4 | 47 | 17 |
| Chester | Total | | 60 | 15 | 4 | 1 | — | | 9 | 5 | 73 | 21 |
| Fleetwood Town | 2013–14 | League Two | 42 | 13 | 3 | 0 | 1 | 0 | 8 (Note: Five appearances and one goal in Football League Trophy, three appearances and one goal in League Two play-offs) | 2 | 54 | 15 |
| Fleetwood Town | 2014–15 | League One | 37 | 2 | 1 | 0 | 1 | 0 | 1 | 0 | 40 | 2 |
| Fleetwood Town | 2015–16 | League One | 39 | 3 | 1 | 0 | 1 | 0 | 3 | 0 | 44 | 3 |
| Fleetwood Town | Total | | 118 | 18 | 5 | 0 | 3 | 0 | 12 | 2 | 138 | 20 |
| Shrewsbury Town | 2016–17 | League One | 12 | 0 | 0 | 0 | 2 | 0 | 1 (Note: Appearance(s) in EFL Trophy) | 0 | 15 | 0 |
| Plymouth Argyle | 2016–17 | League Two | 17 | 2 | 0 | 0 | 0 | 0 | 0 | 0 | 17 | 2 |
| Plymouth Argyle | 2017–18 | League One | 30 | 3 | 1 | 0 | 1 | 0 | 3 | 0 | 35 | 3 |
| Plymouth Argyle | 2018–19 | League One | 37 | 3 | 2 | 1 | 1 | 0 | 2 | 0 | 42 | 4 |
| Plymouth Argyle | 2019–20 | League Two | 32 | 10 | 3 | 1 | 0 | 0 | 3 | 0 | 38 | 11 |
| Plymouth Argyle | Total | | 116 | 18 | 6 | 2 | 2 | 0 | 8 | 0 | 132 | 21 |
| Bolton Wanderers | 2020–21 | League Two | 32 | 7 | 1 | 0 | 1 | 1 | 1 | 0 | 35 | 8 |
| Bolton Wanderers | 2021–22 | League One | 14 | 3 | 0 | 0 | 2 | 0 | 1 | 0 | 17 | 3 |
| Bolton Wanderers | Total | | 46 | 10 | 1 | 0 | 3 | 1 | 2 | 0 | 52 | 11 |
| Stockport County | 2021–22 | National League | 25 | 4 | 2 | 0 | — | | 0 | 0 | 27 | 4 |
| Stockport County | 2022–23 | League Two | 28 | 4 | 2 | 2 | 1 | 0 | 2 (Note: One appearance in EFL League Two play-offs) | 0 | 33 | 6 |
| Stockport County | 2023–24 | League Two | 33 | 8 | 2 | 0 | 1 | 0 | 1 | 0 | 37 | 8 |
| Stockport County | Total | | 86 | 16 | 6 | 2 | 2 | 0 | 3 | 0 | 97 | 18 |
| Bradford City | 2024–25 | League Two | 24 | 7 | 0 | 0 | 1 | 0 | 3 | 0 | 28 | 7 |
| Bradford City | 2025–26 | League One | 29 | 10 | 0 | 0 | 2 | 0 | 0 | 0 | 31 | 10 |
| Bradford City | Total | | 53 | 17 | 0 | 0 | 3 | 0 | 3 | 0 | 59 | 17 |
| Career total | | | 544 | 101 | 23 | 5 | 15 | 1 | 44 | 9 | 603+ | 115+ |

== Honours ==
Chester

- Conference North: 2012–13
- Northern Premier League Premier Division: 2011–12
- Peter Swales Shield: 2012
- Cheshire Senior Cup: 2012–13

Fleetwood Town

- Football League Two play-offs: 2014

Plymouth Argyle

- EFL League Two second-place promotion: 2016–17

Bolton Wanderers

- EFL League Two third-place promotion: 2020–21

Stockport County

- EFL League Two: 2023–24
- National League: 2021–22

Bradford City

- EFL League Two third-place promotion: 2024–25

Individual

- PFA Team of the Year: 2013–14 League Two, 2019–20 League Two
- Plymouth Argyle Player of the Year: 2019–20
- EFL League Two Team of the Season: 2020–21
- EFL League Two Player of the Month: February 2025
