= 2018–19 Plymouth Argyle F.C. season =

English football club season

Plymouth Argyle
2018–19 season
- Chairman: James Brent (stepped down 31 October 2018); Simon Hallett
- Manager: Derek Adams (until 28 April); Ryan Lowe (from 5 June)
- Stadium: Home Park
- League One: 21st (relegated)
- FA Cup: Second round
- EFL Cup: Second round
- EFL Trophy: Group stage
- Top goalscorer: League: Freddie Ladapo (18); All: Freddie Ladapo (19)
- Highest home attendance: 12,065 vs Sunderland (3 November 2018)
- Lowest home attendance: League: 8,190 vs Burton Albion (20 October 2018); All: 1,504 vs Chelsea U21 (30 October 2018)
- Average home league attendance: 9,847
- Biggest win: 5–1 (23 February 2019 vs. Rochdale)
- Biggest defeat: 0–5 (30 October 2018 vs. Chelsea U21, EFL Trophy)
Home colours	Away colours

The 2018–19 season was Plymouth Argyle's second consecutive season in League One and their 133rd year in existence. Along with competing in League One, the club participated in the FA Cup, EFL Cup and EFL Trophy. The season covers the period from 1 July 2018 to 30 June 2019.

== First-Team Squad ==
As of 29 March 2020

No.	Name	Pos.	Nat.	Place of birth	Age	Apps	Goals	Signed from	Date signed	Fee	Ends
Goalkeepers
1	Matt Macey	GK	(England)	Bath	24	38	0	Arsenal	30 July 2018	Loan	2019
21	Kyle Letheren	GK	(Wales)	Llanelli	31	23	0	York City	5 September 2017	Free	2019
31	Michael Cooper	GK	(England)	Exeter	19	4	0	Academy	1 July 2017	Trainee	Undisclosed
—	Harry Burgoyne	GK	(England)	Ludlow	22	0	0	Wolverhampton Wanderers	16 June 2018	Loan	2019
Defenders
2	Joe Riley	RB	(England)	Salford	27	20	0	Shrewsbury Town	1 July 2018	Free	Undisclosed
3	Gary Sawyer	LB	(England)	Bideford	33	257	6	Leyton Orient	25 June 2015	Free	2019
5	Ryan Edwards	CB	(England)	Liverpool	25	68	9	Morecambe	1 July 2017	Undisclosed	Undisclosed
14	Niall Canavan	CB	(Republic of Ireland) (England)	Leeds	28	38	2	Rochdale	1 July 2018	Free	Undisclosed
20	Lloyd Jones	CB	(England)	Plymouth	23	9	1	Luton Town	31 January 2019	Loan	2019
22	Tafari Moore	RB	(England) (Jamaica) (Barbados)	Kilburn	21	18	0	Arsenal	1 July 2018	Free	Undisclosed
23	Ashley Smith-Brown	LB	(England)	Manchester	23	37	1	Manchester City	1 July 2018	Undisclosed	Undisclosed
25	Scott Wootton	CB	(England)	Birkenhead	27	10	0	Milton Keynes Dons	1 July 2018	Free	Undisclosed
26	Oscar Threlkeld	RB	(England)	Bolton	25	108	4	Waasland-Beveren	8 January 2019	Loan	2019
Midfielders
4	Yann Songo'o	DM	(Cameroon) (France)	Toulon	27	139	3	Free agent	19 June 2016	Free	Undisclosed
6	Jamie Ness	CM	(Scotland)	Irvine	28	59	4	Scunthorpe United	1 July 2017	Free	Undisclosed
7	Antoni Sarcevic	CM	(England)	Manchester	27	94	9	Shrewsbury Town	26 January 2017	Free	Undisclosed
8	David Fox	CM	(England)	Leek	35	143	3	Crewe Alexandra	22 July 2016	Free	Undisclosed
10	Graham Carey	AM	(Republic of Ireland)	Blanchardstown	30	197	49	Ross County	2 July 2015	Free	Undisclosed
11	Rúben Lameiras	AM	(Portugal)	Lisbon	24	82	18	Coventry City	1 July 2017	Free	Undisclosed
13	Paul Anderson	LM	(England)	Melton Mowbray	30	3	0	Mansfield Town	22 February 2019	Free	2019
15	Conor Grant	CM	(England)	Fazakerley	24	14	0	Everton	1 July 2018	Free	Undisclosed
16	Joel Grant	LM	(Jamaica)	Acton	31	57	10	Exeter City	1 July 2017	Free	Undisclosed
17	Lionel Ainsworth	RM	(England)	Nottingham	31	25	0	Motherwell	1 July 2017	Free	Undisclosed
36	Cameron Sangster	CM	(England)	Newton Abbot	19	2	0	Academy	1 July 2016	Trainee	Undisclosed
Forwards
9	Ryan Taylor	CF	(England)	Rotherham	31	78	10	Oxford United	30 January 2017	Free	Undisclosed
19	Freddie Ladapo	CF	(England) (Nigeria)	Romford	26	49	19	Southend United	1 July 2018	Free	Undisclosed
29	Alex Fletcher	CF	(England)	Newton Abbot	20	25	3	Academy	22 June 2017	Trainee	Undisclosed
35	Luke Jephcott	CF	(Wales) (England)	Ponsanooth	19	10	0	Academy	1 July 2018	Trainee	Undisclosed
Out on Loan
18	Calum Dyson	CF	(England)	Fazakerley	22	2	0	Everton	1 July 2018	Free	Undisclosed
28	Jordan Bentley	DF	(England)	Plymouth	20	2	0	Academy	4 March 2016	Trainee	Undisclosed

=== Statistics ===
As of game played on 12 May 2019

No.	Pos	Nat	Player	Total		League One		FA Cup		League Cup		League Trophy	
No.	Pos	Nat	Player	Apps	Goals	Apps	Goals	Apps	Goals	Apps	Goals	Apps	Goals
1	GK	(England) ENG	Matt Macey	38	0	33+1	0	2+0	0	2+0	0	0+0	0
2	DF	(England) ENG	Joe Riley	20	0	14+4	0	1+0	0	1+0	0	0+0	0
3	DF	(England) ENG	Gary Sawyer	33	0	28+4	0	0+0	0	1+0	0	0+0	0
4	MF	(Cameroon) CMR	Yann Songo'o	45	1	36+4	0	2+0	0	2+0	1	1+0	0
5	DF	(England) ENG	Ryan Edwards	37	5	34+1	5	0+0	0	1+0	0	1+0	0
6	MF	(Scotland) SCO	Jamie Ness	30	1	18+6	0	2+0	0	2+0	1	2+0	0
7	MF	(England) ENG	Antoni Sarcevic	41	4	36+0	3	2+0	1	1+0	0	2+0	0
8	MF	(England) ENG	David Fox	46	1	39+3	1	2+0	0	0+1	0	1+0	0
9	FW	(England) ENG	Ryan Taylor	36	0	5+27	0	0+1	0	0+2	0	1+0	0
10	MF	(Republic of Ireland) IRL	Graham Carey	46	6	40+2	6	1+0	0	1+1	0	0+1	0
11	MF	(Portugal) POR	Rúben Lameiras	44	12	30+10	11	0+2	1	0+0	0	2+0	0
13	MF	(England) ENG	Paul Anderson	3	0	0+3	0	0+0	0	0+0	0	0+0	0
14	DF	(Republic of Ireland) IRL	Niall Canavan	38	2	29+4	2	2+0	0	1+0	0	1+1	0
15	MF	(England) ENG	Conor Grant	14	0	10+0	0	1+0	0	2+0	0	1+0	0
16	MF	(Jamaica) JAM	Joel Grant	21	4	14+3	4	2+0	0	1+0	0	0+1	0
17	MF	(England) ENG	Lionel Ainsworth	2	0	0+1	0	0+0	0	0+0	0	1+0	0
19	FW	(England) ENG	Freddie Ladapo	49	19	42+3	18	2+0	0	2+0	1	0+0	0
20	DF	(England) ENG	Lloyd Jones	9	1	4+5	1	0+0	0	0+0	0	0+0	0
21	GK	(Wales) WAL	Kyle Letheren	14	0	12+0	0	0+0	0	0+0	0	2+0	0
22	DF	(England) ENG	Tafari Moore	18	0	14+0	0	1+0	0	1+0	0	2+0	0
23	DF	(England) ENG	Ashley Smith-Brown	37	1	30+1	1	1+0	0	2+0	0	3+0	0
25	DF	(England) ENG	Scott Wootton	10	0	6+3	0	0+0	0	1+0	0	0+0	0
26	DF	(England) ENG	Oscar Threlkeld	11	1	6+5	1	0+0	0	0+0	0	0+0	0
29	FW	(England) ENG	Alex Fletcher	6	0	0+3	0	0+0	0	0+0	0	2+1	0
31	GK	(England) ENG	Michael Cooper	2	0	0+1	0	0+0	0	0+0	0	1+0	0
33	DF	(England) ENG	Ryan Law	1	0	0+0	0	0+0	0	0+0	0	1+0	0
35	FW	(Wales) WAL	Luke Jephcott	9	0	2+6	0	0+0	0	0+0	0	1+0	0
37	MF	(England) ENG	Michael Peck	1	0	0+0	0	0+0	0	0+0	0	1+0	0
38	MF	(England) ENG	Adam Randell	1	0	0+0	0	0+0	0	0+0	0	1+0	0
42	MF	(England) ENG	Tom Purrington	1	0	0+0	0	0+0	0	0+0	0	0+1	0
Players out on loan:
18	FW	(England) ENG	Calum Dyson	2	0	0+0	0	0+0	0	0+0	0	0+2	0
36	FW	(England) ENG	Alex Battle	1	0	0+0	0	0+0	0	0+0	0	1+0	0
Players who left the club:
13	MF	(England) ENG	Stuart O'Keefe	13	0	6+5	0	0+0	0	1+0	0	1+0	0
20	MF	(Scotland) SCO	Gregg Wylde	11	0	1+6	0	0+0	0	0+2	0	1+1	0
24	DF	(Scotland) SCO	Peter Grant	9	0	5+1	0	0+0	0	0+0	0	2+1	0

=== Goals record ===
As of 12 May 2019

Rank	No.	Nat.	Po.	Name	League One	FA Cup	League Cup	League Trophy	Total
1	19	(England)	CF	Freddie Ladapo	18	0	1	0	19
2	11	(Portugal)	AM	Rúben Lameiras	11	1	0	0	12
3	10	(Republic of Ireland)	AM	Graham Carey	6	0	0	0	6
4	5	(England)	CB	Ryan Edwards	5	0	0	0	5
5	7	(England)	CM	Antoni Sarcevic	3	1	0	0	4
5	16	(Jamaica)	LM	Joel Grant	4	0	0	0	4
7	14	(Republic of Ireland)	CB	Niall Canavan	2	0	0	0	2
8	8	(England)	CM	David Fox	1	0	0	0	1
8	4	(Cameroon)	DM	Yann Songo'o	0	0	1	0	1
8	6	(Scotland)	CM	Jamie Ness	0	0	1	0	1
8	20	(England)	CB	Lloyd Jones	1	0	0	0	1
8	23	(England)	LB	Ashley Smith-Brown	1	0	0	0	1
8	26	(England)	RB	Oscar Threlkeld	1	0	0	0	1
Own Goals					3	0	0	0	3
Total					57	2	3	0	61

=== Disciplinary record ===
As of 12 May 2019

Rank	No.	Nat.	Po.	Name	League One			FA Cup			League Cup			League Trophy			Total		
Rank	No.	Nat.	Po.	Name	Booked	(yellow card) (yellow-red card)	Sent off (straight red)	Booked	(yellow card) (yellow-red card)	Sent off (straight red)	Booked	(yellow card) (yellow-red card)	Sent off (straight red)	Booked	(yellow card) (yellow-red card)	Sent off (straight red)	Booked	(yellow card) (yellow-red card)	Sent off (straight red)
1	7	(England)	CM	Antoni Sarcevic	11	0	0	1	0	0	0	0	0	0	0	0	12	0	0
1	10	(Republic of Ireland)	AM	Graham Carey	10	0	0	1	0	0	1	0	0	0	0	0	12	0	0
1	23	(England)	LB	Ashley Smith-Brown	10	0	0	1	0	0	1	0	0	0	0	0	12	0	0
4	6	(Scotland)	CM	Jamie Ness	6	1	0	1	0	0	1	0	0	1	0	0	9	1	0
5	4	(Cameroon)	DM	Yann Songo'o	5	1	0	0	0	0	1	0	0	1	0	0	7	1	0
6	5	(England)	CB	Ryan Edwards	6	0	0	0	0	0	1	0	0	0	0	0	7	0	0
6	8	(England)	CM	David Fox	6	0	0	0	0	0	0	0	0	1	0	0	7	0	0
8	2	(England)	RB	Joe Riley	3	0	0	1	0	0	0	0	0	0	0	0	4	0	0
8	~~13~~	(England)	CM	Stuart O'Keefe	4	0	0	0	0	0	0	0	0	0	0	0	4	0	0
8	14	(Republic of Ireland)	CB	Niall Canavan	4	0	0	0	0	0	0	0	0	0	0	0	4	0	0
11	9	(England)	CF	Ryan Taylor	2	0	0	0	0	0	0	0	0	0	0	0	2	0	0
11	16	(Jamaica)	LM	Joel Grant	2	0	0	0	0	0	0	0	0	0	0	0	2	0	0
11	19	(England)	CF	Freddie Ladapo	1	0	0	1	0	0	0	0	0	0	0	0	2	0	0
12	3	(England)	LB	Gary Sawyer	1	0	0	0	0	0	0	0	0	0	0	0	1	0	0
12	~~20~~	(Scotland)	LM	Gregg Wylde	1	0	0	0	0	0	0	0	0	0	0	0	1	0	0
12	~~24~~	(Scotland)	CB	Peter Grant	1	0	0	0	0	0	0	0	0	0	0	0	1	0	0
12	37	(England)	CM	Michael Peck	0	0	0	0	0	0	0	0	0	1	0	0	1	0	0
Total					75	2	0	5	0	0	5	0	0	4	0	0	90	2	0

== Transfers ==
=== Transfers in ===
Date	Position	Nationality	Name	From	Fee	Ref.
1 July 2018	CB	(Republic of Ireland)	Niall Canavan	Rochdale	Free transfer	
1 July 2018	CF	(England)	Calum Dyson	Everton	Free transfer	
1 July 2018	CM	(England)	Conor Grant	Everton	Free transfer	
1 July 2018	CB	(Scotland)	Peter Grant	(Scotland) Falkirk	Free transfer	
1 July 2018	RB	(England)	Tafari Moore	Arsenal	Free transfer	
1 July 2018	CF	(Nigeria)	Freddie Ladapo	Southend United	Free transfer	
1 July 2018	RB	(England)	Joe Riley	Shrewsbury Town	Free transfer	
1 July 2018	LB	(England)	Ashley Smith-Brown	Manchester City	Undisclosed	
1 July 2018	CB	(England)	Scott Wootton	Milton Keynes Dons	Free transfer	
8 January 2019	RB	(England)	Oscar Threlkeld	(Belgium) Waasland-Beveren	Undisclosed	
22 February 2019	RM	(England)	Paul Anderson	Mansfield Town	Free transfer	

=== Transfers out ===
Date	Position	Nationality	Name	To	Fee	Ref.
1 July 2018	CF	(England)	Nathan Blissett	Macclesfield Town	Released	
1 July 2018	CB	(England)	Sonny Bradley	Luton Town	Free transfer	
1 July 2018	CF	(Wales)	Simon Church	Retired	—N/a	
1 July 2018	RW	(England)	Billy Craske	Bromley	Released	
1 July 2018	CB	(England)	Elliott Crawford	Free agent	Released	
1 July 2018	CB	(England)	Harry Downing	Free agent	Released	
1 July 2018	GK	(England)	Luke McCormick	Swindon Town	Released	
1 July 2018	RB	(Scotland)	Gary Miller	Carlisle United	Released	
1 July 2018	DM	(Northern Ireland)	Paul Paton	(Scotland) Falkirk	Released	
1 July 2018	CB	(England)	Callum Rose	Dorchester Town	Released	
1 July 2018	CM	(England)	Aaron Taylor	Free agent	Released	
1 July 2018	LB	(Scotland)	Aaron Taylor-Sinclair	(Scotland) Motherwell	Released	
1 July 2018	GK	(Netherlands)	Robbert te Loeke	Retired	—N/a	
1 July 2018	RB	(England)	Oscar Threlkeld	(Belgium) Waasland-Beveren	Free transfer	
1 July 2018	MF	(England)	Matt Ward	Free agent	Released	
7 January 2019	LM	(Scotland)	Gregg Wylde	(Scotland) Livingston	Mutual consent	
29 January 2019	CB	(Scotland)	Peter Grant	Carlisle United	Mutual consent	
10 May 2019	RM	(England)	Paul Anderson	Free agent	Released	

=== Loans in ===
Start date	Position	Nationality	Name	From	End date	Ref.
1 July 2018	GK	(England)	Harry Burgoyne	Wolverhampton Wanderers	31 May 2019	
30 July 2018	GK	(England)	Matt Macey	Arsenal	31 May 2019	
24 August 2018	CM	(England)	Stuart O'Keefe	(Wales) Cardiff City	January 2019	
31 January 2019	CB	(England)	Lloyd Jones	Luton Town	31 January 2019	

=== Loans out ===
Start date	Position	Nationality	Name	To	End date	Ref.
10 October 2018	CB	(England)	Jordan Bentley	Truro City	January 2019	
10 October 2018	CM	(Northern Ireland)	Dan Rooney	Truro City	January 2019	
3 January 2019	CF	(England)	Alex Battle	Truro City	31 May 2019	
11 January 2019	RB	(England)	Harry Hodges	Gloucester City	10 February 2019	
11 January 2019	LB	(England)	Ryan Law	Gloucester City	10 February 2019	
31 January 2019	CF	(England)	Calum Dyson	Stevenage	31 May 2019	

== Competitions ==
=== Friendlies ===
On 10 May 2018, Plymouth Argyle announced eight pre-season friendlies for July. These were extended into ten friendlies when a tour of The Netherlands was announced in early July.

7 July 2018 Friendly	Plymouth Parkway	2–4	Plymouth Argyle	Plymouth
12:30 BST	Smith 47'; Bentley 68'	Report	Sawyer 19'; C. Grant 26'; J. Grant 55'; Edwards 58'	Stadium: Bolitho Park; Attendance: 1,650 (Approx.); Referee: Scott Jackson

10 July 2018 Friendly	Torpoint Athletic	0–6	Plymouth Argyle	Torpoint
19:30 BST		Report	Lameiras; Ladapo; Carey; Wylde (x2); Fox	Stadium: The Mill; Referee: Stuart Kane

14 July 2018 Friendly	Helston Athletic	0–5	Plymouth Argyle	Helston
15:00 BST	Jephcott 8'; Sangster 58' 63'; Lolos 73'; Rooney 79'	Report		Stadium: Kellaway Park

14 July 2018 Friendly	Tavistock	1–5	Plymouth Argyle	Tavistock
15:00 BST	Coombes 5'	Report	Carey 16' (pen.), 27' (pen.); Ladapo 40'; Lameiras 51'; Grant 72'	Stadium: Langsford Park; Attendance: 791; Referee: Lee Swabey

17 July 2018 Friendly	Torquay United	0–1	Plymouth Argyle	Torquay
19:30 BST		Report	Carey 63'	Stadium: Plainmoor; Attendance: 1,824; Referee: Adam Bromley

18 July 2018 Friendly	Bideford	0–3	Plymouth Argyle	Bideford
19:30 BST		Report	J.Grant 17'; Edwards 28'; Wylde 31'	Stadium: The Sports Ground; Attendance: 585

21 July 2018 Friendly	Yeovil Town	5–1	Plymouth Argyle	Yeovil
15:00 BST	Jaiyesimi 3'; Browne 11', 30'; Fisher 52', 60'	Report	J.Grant 19'	Stadium: Huish Park; Referee: Brett Huxtable

24 July 2018 Friendly	SV Schermbeck	0–1	Plymouth Argyle	Schermbeck (Germany)
17:30 BST		Report	Dyson	Stadium: Waldsportplatz; Referee: Nadine Westerhoff

25 July 2018 Friendly	Feyenoord	2–1	Plymouth Argyle	Rotterdam (Netherlands)
	Vente; Burger	Report	Lameiras	Stadium: 1908 Training Ground

27 July 2018 Friendly	MVV Maastricht	1–0	Plymouth Argyle	Maastricht (Netherlands)
20:00 BST	Koolhof 7'	Report		Stadium: De Geusselt

31 July 2018 Friendly	Callington Town	0–7	Plymouth Argyle	Callington
19:30 BST			Jephcott 7', 29'; Fletcher 18', 51'; J.Grant 20'; Sangster 39' (pen.); Battle 81'	Stadium: Marshfield Parc

=== League One ===
==== League table ====
Pos	Team	Pld	W	D	L	GF	GA	GD	Pts	Promotion, qualification or relegation
19	Southend United	46	14	8	24	55	68	−13	50	
20	AFC Wimbledon	46	13	11	22	42	63	−21	50	
21	Plymouth Argyle (R)	46	13	11	22	56	80	−24	50	Relegation to EFL League Two
22	Walsall (R)	46	12	11	23	49	71	−22	47	Relegation to EFL League Two
23	Scunthorpe United (R)	46	12	10	24	53	83	−30	46	Relegation to EFL League Two

Source: EFL Official Website
Rules for classification: 1) Points; 2) Goal difference; 3) Number of goals scored; 4) Head-to-head results
(R) Relegated

==== Results summary ====
Overall								Home						Away					
Pld	W	D	L	GF	GA	GD	Pts	W	D	L	GF	GA	GD	W	D	L	GF	GA	GD
46	13	11	22	56	80	−24	50	9	6	8	36	38	−2	4	5	14	20	42	−22

Last updated: 4 May 2019.
Source: BBC

==== Results by matchday ====
Matchday	1	2	3	4	5	6	7	8	9	10	11	12	13	14	15	16	17	18	19	20	21	22	23	24	25	26	27	28	29	30	31	32	33	34	35	36	37	38	39	40	41	42	43	44	45	46
Ground	A	H	A	H	H	A	A	H	A	H	A	H	A	H	H	A	H	A	H	A	H	A	H	A	A	H	A	H	H	A	A	H	A	H	A	H	H	A	H	A	H	A	A	H	A	H
Result	L	D	L	D	L	L	D	L	L	L	D	W	L	L	W	W	L	L	W	L	D	W	L	L	D	W	W	W	W	L	W	D	D	W	L	D	W	L	D	D	L	L	L	L	L	W
Position	19	16	20	21	24	24	24	24	24	24	24	23	24	24	23	22	22	22	22	22	22	21	23	24	24	23	23	21	17	17	16	15	15	14	15	15	12	12	14	14	15	18	19	20	21	21

Updated to match(es) played on 4 May 2019. Source: Statto.com
A = Away; H = Home; W = Win; D = Draw; L = Loss

==== Matches ====
On 21 June 2018, the League One fixtures for the forthcoming season were announced.

4 August 2018 1	Walsall	2–1	Plymouth Argyle	Walsall
15:00 BST	Cook 45+1'; Leahy 64'	Report	Edwards 40'	Stadium: Bescot Stadium; Attendance: 5,755; Referee: Andy Haines

11 August 2018 2	Plymouth Argyle	1–1	Southend United	Plymouth
15:00 BST	Carey 20' (pen.); Edwards (yellow card) 79'	Report	Demetriou 38' (pen.)	Stadium: Home Park; Attendance: 9,866; Referee: John Busby

18 August 2018 3	Coventry City	1–0	Plymouth Argyle	Coventry
15:00 BST	Bakayoko 43' (pen.)	Report	Carey (yellow card) 44'; Ness (yellow card) 44' (yellow-red card) 58'; Taylor (yellow card) 84'	Stadium: Ricoh Arena; Attendance: 11,453; Referee: Darren Drysdale

21 August 2018 4	Plymouth Argyle	1–1	Wycombe Wanderers	Plymouth
19:45 BST	Ladapo 4'	Report	Bloomfield 84', (yellow card) 85'	Stadium: Home Park; Attendance: 9,244; Referee: Ollie Yates

25 August 2018 5	Plymouth Argyle	1–5	Peterborough United	Plymouth
15:00 BST	Edwards 90+1'	Report	Godden 8', 90+4'; Dembélé 11'; Cummings 48', 54' (pen.)	Stadium: Home Park; Attendance: 9,214; Referee: Chris Sarginson

1 September 2018 6	Portsmouth	3–0	Plymouth Argyle	Portsmouth
15:00 BST	Curtis 22', 69'; Lowe 63'; Thompson (yellow card) 89'	Report	Ness (yellow card) 39'	Stadium: Fratton Park; Attendance: 18,872; Referee: Tom Nield

8 September 2018 7	Bristol Rovers	0–0	Plymouth Argyle	Horfield
13:30 BST		Report		Stadium: Memorial Stadium; Attendance: 9,006; Referee: Michael Salisbury

15 September 2018 8	Plymouth Argyle	0–1	Blackpool	Plymouth
15:00 BST		Report	Cullen 14'; Bola (red card) 90+3'; Daniels (red card) 90+3'	Stadium: Home Park; Attendance: 8,658; Referee: Neil Hair

22 September 2018 9	Charlton Athletic	2–1	Plymouth Argyle	Charlton
15:00 BST	Ahearne-Grant 12', 88'	Report	Carey 9'	Stadium: The Valley; Attendance: 10,818; Referee: Dean Whitestone

29 September 2018 10	Plymouth Argyle	2–3	Doncaster Rovers	Plymouth
15:00 BST	Lameiras 40'; Carey 90+6'	Report	Marquis 18', 90'; Blair 57'	Stadium: Home Park; Attendance: 8,532; Referee: Kevin Johnson

2 October 2018 11	Barnsley	1–1	Plymouth Argyle	Barnsley
19:45 BST	Mowatt 8'	Report	Lameiras 39'	Stadium: Oakwell; Attendance: 10,717; Referee: Carl Boyeson

6 October 2018 12	Plymouth Argyle	1–0	AFC Wimbledon	Plymouth
15:00 BST	Smith-Brown (yellow card) 61'; Ladapo 75'	Report	Wagstaff (yellow card) 80'; Purrington (yellow card) 90'	Stadium: Home Park; Attendance: 8,542; Referee: Alan Young

13 October 2018 13	Oxford United	2–0	Plymouth Argyle	Oxford
15:00 BST	Mackie 4', (yellow card) 79'; Brannagan (yellow card) 30'; Nelson 74'	Report	Songo'o (yellow card) 26', (yellow card) 81' (red card); Smith-Brown (yellow card) 43'; O'Keefe (yellow card) 80'	Stadium: Kassam Stadium; Attendance: 7,332 (1,285 away); Referee: Andy Woolmer

20 October 2018 14	Plymouth Argyle	2–3	Burton Albion	Plymouth
15:00 BST	Ladapo 9', 35'; Edwards (yellow card) 67'; Wylde (yellow card) 84'	Report	McFadzean 19', 84'; Akins 39'	Stadium: Home Park; Attendance: 8,190; Referee: Thomas Bramall

23 October 2018 15	Plymouth Argyle	3–1	Gillingham	Plymouth
19:45 BST	Ladapo 22', 34'; Lameiras 73'	Report	O'Neill 76'	Stadium: Home Park; Attendance: 8,754; Referee: Darren England

27 October 2018 16	Scunthorpe United	1–4	Plymouth Argyle	Scunthorpe
15:00 BST	McArdle (yellow card) 17'; Colclough (yellow card) 41'; Novak 49'; Thomas (yellow card) 56'	Report	Ladapo 13'; Canavan 45+1'; J. Grant 57'; Ness (yellow card) 60'; Sarcevic 90+4'	Stadium: Glanford Park; Attendance: 3,508; Referee: Scott Oldham

3 November 2018 17	Plymouth Argyle	0–2	Sunderland	Plymouth
16:00 GMT	Sarcevic (yellow card) 49'	Report	McGeady 53', 78' (pen.); McGeouch (yellow card) 60'; Flanagan (yellow card) 61'; O'Nien (yellow card) 84'	Stadium: Home Park; Attendance: 12,065; Referee: Carl Boyeson

17 November 2018 18	Luton Town	5–1	Plymouth Argyle	Luton
15:00 GMT	Collins 12', 45+1' (pen.), 77'; Lee 23'; Justin 29'	Report	Grant 89'	Stadium: Kenilworth Road; Attendance: 10,004; Referee: Darren England

24 November 2018 19	Plymouth Argyle	2–1	Fleetwood Town	Plymouth
15:00 GMT	Ladapo 72', 81'	Report	Madden 84'	Stadium: Home Park; Attendance: 8,301; Referee: Charles Breakspear

27 November 2018 20	Shrewsbury Town	2–0	Plymouth Argyle	Shrewsbury
19:45 GMT	Docherty 35'; Okenabirhie 68'	Report		Stadium: New Meadow; Attendance: 5,279; Referee: Matthew Donohue

8 December 2018 21	Plymouth Argyle	3–3	Bradford City	Plymouth
15:00 GMT	Ladapo 12', 74'; Grant 50'	Report	Payne 4', 18'; Miller 53'	Stadium: Home Park; Attendance: 9,092; Referee: Robert Lewis

15 December 2018 22	Rochdale	1–2	Plymouth Argyle	Rochdale
15:00 GMT	Perkins (yellow card) 62'; Inman 76'	Report	Grant 73'; Perkins 80' (o.g.)	Stadium: Spotland Stadium; Attendance: 2,663; Referee: Carl Boyeson

23 December 2018 23	Plymouth Argyle	0–3	Accrington Stanley	Plymouth
15:00 GMT	Fox (yellow card) 8'	Report	Hughes (yellow card) 21'; Conneely (yellow card) 25'; Finley 61'; McConville 65'; Clark 77'; Barlaser (yellow card) 81'	Stadium: Home Park; Attendance: 10,193; Referee: Kevin Johnson

26 December 2018 24	AFC Wimbledon	2–1	Plymouth Argyle	London
15:00 GMT	Wordsworth 32'; Pinnock 75'	Report	Fox 23'; Sarcevic (yellow card) 26'; Smith-Brown (yellow card) 59'	Stadium: Kingsmeadow; Attendance: 4,434; Referee: Craig Hicks

29 December 2018 25	Burton Albion	1–1	Plymouth Argyle	Burton upon Trent
15:00 GMT	Miller 4'; Wallace (yellow card) 73'; McCrory (yellow card) 77'; Quinn (yellow card) 77'	Report	Smith-Brown (yellow card) 49'; Lameiras 52'; Sarcevic (yellow card) 80'	Stadium: Pirelli Stadium; Attendance: 3,577; Referee: Eddie Ilderton

1 January 2019 26	Plymouth Argyle	3–0	Oxford United	Plymouth
15:00 GMT	Sarcevic 9' (yellow card) 33'; Lameiras 41', 67'; Carey (yellow card) 78'; Sawyer (yellow card) 81'	Report	Nelson (yellow card) 33'; Brannagan (yellow card) 54'; Dickie (yellow card) 59'	Stadium: Home Park; Attendance: 10,223; Referee: Brett Huxtable

12 January 2019 27	Southend United	2–3	Plymouth Argyle	Southend-on-Sea
15:00 GMT	Cox (yellow card) 55' (goal) 86' (pen.); Hendrie (yellow card) 55'; Dieng (yellow card) 61'; Kelman 90+2'	Report	Sarcevic 21' (yellow card) 54'; Ladapo 49'; Fox (yellow card) 62'; Lameiras 73'; Carey (yellow card) 87'	Stadium: Roots Hall; Attendance: 6,851; Referee: Graham Salisbury

19 January 2019 28	Plymouth Argyle	2–1	Coventry City	Plymouth
15:00 GMT	Sarcevic (yellow card) 35'; Songo'o (yellow card) 47'; Smith-Brown (yellow card) 54'; Lameiras 63', 70'	Report	Mason (yellow card) 43'; Chaplin 55'	Stadium: Home Park; Attendance: 10,686; Referee: Trevor Kettle

22 January 2019 29	Plymouth Argyle	2–1	Walsall	Plymouth
19:45 GMT	Edwards 54'; Canavan 65'; Songo'o (yellow card) 90'	Report	Osbourne (yellow card) 26'; Gordon (yellow card) 57'; Cook 82'	Stadium: Home Park; Attendance: 8,446; Referee: John Busby

26 January 2019 30	Wycombe Wanderers	1–0	Plymouth Argyle	High Wycombe
15:00 GMT	Akinfenwa 24'; Jacobson (yellow card) 45+3'	Report	Fox (yellow card) 36'; Edwards (yellow card) 87'; Ladapo (yellow card) 90+7'	Stadium: Adams Park; Attendance: 5,691; Referee: Scott Oldham

2 February 2019 31	Peterborough United	0–1	Plymouth Argyle	Peterborough
15:00 GMT	Tomlin (yellow card) 45' (yellow-red card) 45+4'	Report	Smith-Brown (yellow card) 64'; Canavan (yellow card) 74'; Lameiras 88'	Stadium: London Road Stadium; Attendance: 6,543; Referee: Peter Wright

9 February 2019 32	Plymouth Argyle	1–1	Portsmouth	Portsmouth
15:00 GMT	Carey 70'	Report	Close 56'; Evans (yellow card) 59'; Thompson (yellow card) 73'; Curtis (yellow card) 78'	Stadium: Home Park; Attendance: 12,052

16 February 2019 33	Bradford City	0–0	Plymouth Argyle	Bradford
15:00 GMT	O'Brien (yellow card) 27'	Report	Smith-Brown (yellow card) 61'	Stadium: Valley Parade; Attendance: D Referee: Eddie Ilderton

23 February 2019 34	Plymouth Argyle	5–1	Rochdale	Plymouth
15:00 GMT	Ladapo 26', 75'; Edwards 61'; Sarcevic (yellow card) 67'; Threlkeld 85'; Smith-Brown 90+4'	Report	Done 48'; Ebanks-Landell (red card) 58'; Camps (yellow card) 72'	Stadium: Home Park; Attendance: 9,360; Referee: Christopher Sarginson

2 March 2019 35	Sunderland	2–0	Plymouth Argyle	Sunderland
15:00 GMT	Cattermole 32'; Dunne (yellow card) 50'; Honeyman 87'	Report	Canavan (yellow card) 90+3'	Stadium: Stadium of Light; Attendance: 32,360; Referee: Graham Salisbury

9 March 2019 36	Plymouth Argyle	0–0	Luton Town	Plymouth
15:00 GMT	Carey (yellow card) 29'; Edwards (yellow card) 42'; Canavan (yellow card) 62'; Fox (yellow card) 80'	Report	Hylton (yellow card) 30'; Shinnie (yellow card) 74'	Stadium: Home Park; Attendance: 11,081; Referee: Darren Drysdale

12 March 2019 37	Plymouth Argyle	2–1	Shrewsbury Town	Plymouth
19:45 GMT	Ladapo 8'; Carey 89' (pen.)	Report	Whalley (yellow card) 37'; Norburn (penalty missed) 60' 60'; Grant (yellow card) 76'; Waterfall (yellow card) 86'	Stadium: Home Park; Attendance: 8,572; Referee: Brett Huxtable

16 March 2019 38	Fleetwood Town	2–0	Plymouth Argyle	Fleetwood
15:00 GMT	Holt (yellow card) 52' (goal) 77'; Hunter 80'	Report		Stadium: Highbury Stadium; Attendance: 2,711; Referee: John Busby

23 March 2019 39	Plymouth Argyle	2–2	Bristol Rovers	Plymouth
15:00 GMT	Lameiras 51'; Craig 75' (o.g.); Ness (yellow card) 88'	Report	Clarke-Harris 72'; Reilly 90+1'; Clarke (yellow card) 90+4'	Stadium: Home Park; Attendance: 12,003; Referee: Roger East

30 March 2019 40	Blackpool	2–2	Plymouth Argyle	Blackpool
15:00 GMT	Gnanduillet (yellow card) 19'; Spearing (yellow card) 80'; Bola 84'; Tilt 90+2'	Report	Ladapo 4'; Carey (yellow card) 55'; Edwards 73'; Songo'o (yellow card) 77'	Stadium: Bloomfield Road; Attendance: 8,343; Referee: Sebastian Stockbridge

6 April 2019 41	Plymouth Argyle	0–2	Charlton Athletic	Plymouth
15:00 BST	Carey (penalty missed) 39'	Report	Sarr (yellow card) 13'; Bauer (yellow card) 18'; Vetokele (yellow card) 32'; Taylor 41'; Bielik (yellow card) 42'; Canavan 49' (o.g.); Purrington (yellow card) 53'	Stadium: Home Park; Attendance: 10,696; Referee: Charles Breakspear

13 April 2019 42	Doncaster Rovers	2–0	Plymouth Argyle	Doncaster
15:00 BST	Rowe 7'; Butler (yellow card) 40'; Andrew 44'	Report	Songo'o (yellow card) 4'; Canavan (yellow card) 66'	Stadium: Keepmoat Stadium; Attendance: 7,795; Referee: Ollie Yates

19 April 2019 43	Gillingham	3–1	Plymouth Argyle	Gillingham
15:00 BST	Byrne (yellow card) 28' (goal) 58'; Charles-Cook 56'; Hanlan 90+1'	Report	Ladapo 25'; Sarcevic (yellow card) 32'; Smith-Brown (yellow card) 71'	Stadium: Priestfield Stadium; Attendance: 5,987; Referee: Antony Coggins

22 April 2019 44	Plymouth Argyle	0–3	Barnsley	Plymouth
15:00 BST		Report	Woodrow 15'; Brown 21'; Mowatt 28'	Stadium: Home Park; Attendance: 10,898; Referee: Stephen Martin

27 April 2019 45	Accrington Stanley	5–1	Plymouth Argyle	Accrington
15:00 BST	Kee 20' (pen.); McConville 36', 43', 51'; Armstrong 66'	Report	Hughes 90+3' (o.g.)	Stadium: Crown Ground; Attendance: 3,134; Referee: Craig Hicks

4 May 2019 46	Plymouth Argyle	3–2	Scunthorpe United	Plymouth
17:30 BST	Jones 8'; Fox (yellow card) 18'; Ladapo 35'; Edwards (yellow card) 36'; Carey (yellow card) 45' (goal) 70'; Songo'o (yellow card) 77'	Report	Wootton (yellow card) 11' (goal) 42'; Webster (yellow card) 18'; Perch (yellow card) 21'; Morris 60'; Hammill (yellow card) 72'; Lund (yellow card) 78'	Stadium: Home Park; Attendance: 11,907; Referee: Roger East

=== FA Cup ===
The first round draw was made live on BBC by Dennis Wise and Dion Dublin on 22 October. The draw for the second round was made live on BBC and BT by Mark Schwarzer and Glenn Murray on 12 November.

10 November 2018 First round	Plymouth Argyle	1–0	Stevenage	Plymouth
15:00 GMT	Lameiras 90+4'	Report		Stadium: Home Park; Attendance: 5,719; Referee: Lee Collins

1 December 2018 Second round	Plymouth Argyle	1–2	Oxford United	Plymouth
15:00 GMT	Riley (yellow card) 35'; Ness (yellow card) 41'; Sarcevic 67'; Smith-Brown (yellow card) 77'	Report	Henry 49'; Brannagan 53', (yellow card) 67'	Stadium: Home Park; Attendance: 5,984; Referee: Peter Wright

=== EFL Cup ===
On 15 June 2018, the draw for the first round was made in Vietnam.

14 August 2018 First round	Bristol City	0–1	Plymouth Argyle	Bristol
19:00 BST	Weimann (yellow card) 86'	Report	Songo'o (yellow card) 4', (goal) 27'; Carey (yellow card) 49'; Ladapo (yellow card) 59'; Smith-Brown (yellow card) 67'	Stadium: Ashton Gate Stadium; Attendance: 9,865; Referee: Kevin Johnson

29 August 2018 Second round	Millwall	3–2	Plymouth Argyle	Bermondsey
19:45 BST	Williams 64' (pen.); Gregory 83'; O'Brien 89'	Report	Ness 41'; Ladapo 67'	Stadium: The Den; Referee: Darren England

=== EFL Trophy ===
On 13 July 2018, the initial group stage draw bar the U21 invited clubs was announced.

Pos	Lge	Team	Pld	W	PW	PL	L	GF	GA	GD	Pts	Qualification
1	ACA	Chelsea U21	3	2	0	0	1	9	3	+6	6	Round 2
2	L2	Newport County	3	2	0	0	1	5	1	+4	6	Round 2
3	L2	Swindon Town	3	2	0	0	1	4	4	0	6	
4	L1	Plymouth Argyle	3	0	0	0	3	0	10	−10	0	

Source: EFL.com

9 October 2018 Group stages	Plymouth Argyle	0–3	Swindon Town	Plymouth
19:30 BST		Report	Richards 16'; Anderson 38'; Woolery 82'	Stadium: Home Park; Attendance: 1,906

30 October 2018 Group stages	Plymouth Argyle	0–5	Chelsea U21	Plymouth
19:30 BST		Report	Brown 19'; Songo'o 36' (o.g.); Taylor-Crossdale 74'; Anjorin 87'; Redan 88'	Stadium: Home Park; Attendance: 1,504

13 November 2018 Group stages	Newport County	2–0	Plymouth Argyle	Newport
19:45 GMT	Semenyo 33'; Harris 45'	Report		Stadium: Rodney Parade; Attendance: 962
