= Tom Purrington =

English footballer

Personal information
- Full name: Tom Purrington
- Date of birth: 24 October 2000 (age 26)
- Place of birth: Exeter, England
- Height: 1.87 m (6 ft 2 in)
- Position: Midfielder

Team information
- Current team: Dorchester Town

Youth career
- 2010–2018: Plymouth Argyle

Senior career*
Years	Team	Apps	(Gls)
2018–2020	Plymouth Argyle	0	(0)
2019–2020	→ Dorchester Town (loan)	20	(3)
2020–2021	Bromley	3	(0)
2021–2022	Dorchester Town	39	(2)
2022–2023	Tiverton Town	37	(4)
2023–2024	Plymouth Parkway	42	(3)
2024–2026	Taunton Town	70	(6)
- * Club domestic league appearances and goals as of 16:02, 31 May 2024 (UTC)

Tom Purrington (born 24 October 2000) is an English professional footballer who plays as a midfielder for Dorchester Town.

== Career ==
Purrington made his professional debut on 13 November 2018 in an EFL Trophy match between Argyle and EFL League Two side Newport County, where he came on as an 81st-minute substitute, replacing Stuart O'Keefe. Newport won the game 2–0.

On 30 August 2019 Purrington, alongside fellow midfielder Cameron Sangster, joined Dorchester Town of the Southern League Premier South on loan until January 2020.

On 8 September 2020, it was announced that Purrington had signed for Bromley after impressing on trial.

In June 2021, Purrington returned to Dorchester Town, having spent time with the club having spent time with the club on loan two years prior. In June 2022, Purrington moved to fellow Southern League Premier Division South club Tiverton Town. Following one season, he joined Plymouth Parkway.

== Personal life ==
Purrington is the younger brother of Exeter City defender Ben Purrington. The pair are nephews of former England rugby union player Richard Hill.

== Career statistics ==
As of end of 2021–22 season

Appearances and goals by club, season and competition
Club	Season	League			FA Cup		League Cup		Other		Total	
Club	Season	Division	Apps	Goals	Apps	Goals	Apps	Goals	Apps	Goals	Apps	Goals
Plymouth Argyle
Plymouth Argyle	2018–19	League One	0	0	0	0	0	0	1 (Note: Appearance in EFL Trophy)	0	1	0
Plymouth Argyle	2019–20	League Two	0	0	0	0	0	0	0	0	0	0
Plymouth Argyle	Plymouth Argyle total		0	0	0	0	0	0	1	0	1	0
Dorchester Town (loan)	2019–20	Southern League Premier Division South	20	3	0	0	—		0	0	20	3
Bromley	2020–21	National League	1	0	0	0	—		2	0	3	0
Dorchester Town	2021–22	Southern League Premier Division South	39	2	1	0	—		1 (Note: Appearance(s) in FA Trophy)	0	41	2
Tiverton Town	2022–23	Southern League Premier Division South	37	4	2	0	—		1	0	40	4
Plymouth Parkway	2023–24	Southern League Premier Division South	42	3	2	0	—		1	0	45	4
Taunton Town	2024–25	Southern League Premier Division South	45	5	4	1	—		1	0	47	6
Career total			181	16	6	1	0	0	0	0	195	19
