= Ashley Smith-Brown =

English footballer

Personal information
- Full name: Ashley Jordan Smith-Brown
- Date of birth: 31 March 1996 (age 30)
- Place of birth: Manchester, England
- Height: 5 ft 10 in (1.77 m)
- Position: Full back

Youth career
- Fletcher Moss Rangers
- 2001–2014: Manchester City

Senior career*
Years	Team	Apps	(Gls)
2014–2018	Manchester City	0	(0)
2016–2017	→ NAC Breda (loan)	29	(1)
2017–2018	→ Heart of Midlothian (loan)	2	(0)
2018	→ Oxford United (loan)	9	(0)
2018–2020	Plymouth Argyle	31	(1)
2019–2020	→ Oldham Athletic (loan)	6	(0)
2020	South Shields	1	(0)
2020–2021	Farsley Celtic	6	(1)
2021–2022	Stalybridge Celtic	28	(1)

International career
2011–2012	England U16	7	(0)
2011–2012	England U17	10	(0)
2013–2014	England U18	4	(0)
2014–2015	England U19	8	(2)
2015	England U20	5	(0)
- * Club domestic league appearances and goals as of 14:11, 4 May 2022

Ashley Jordan Smith-Brown (born 31 March 1996) is an English professional footballer who last played for Stalybridge Celtic. Primarily a left back, he has also been deployed as a right back owing to his two-footedness.

== Club career ==
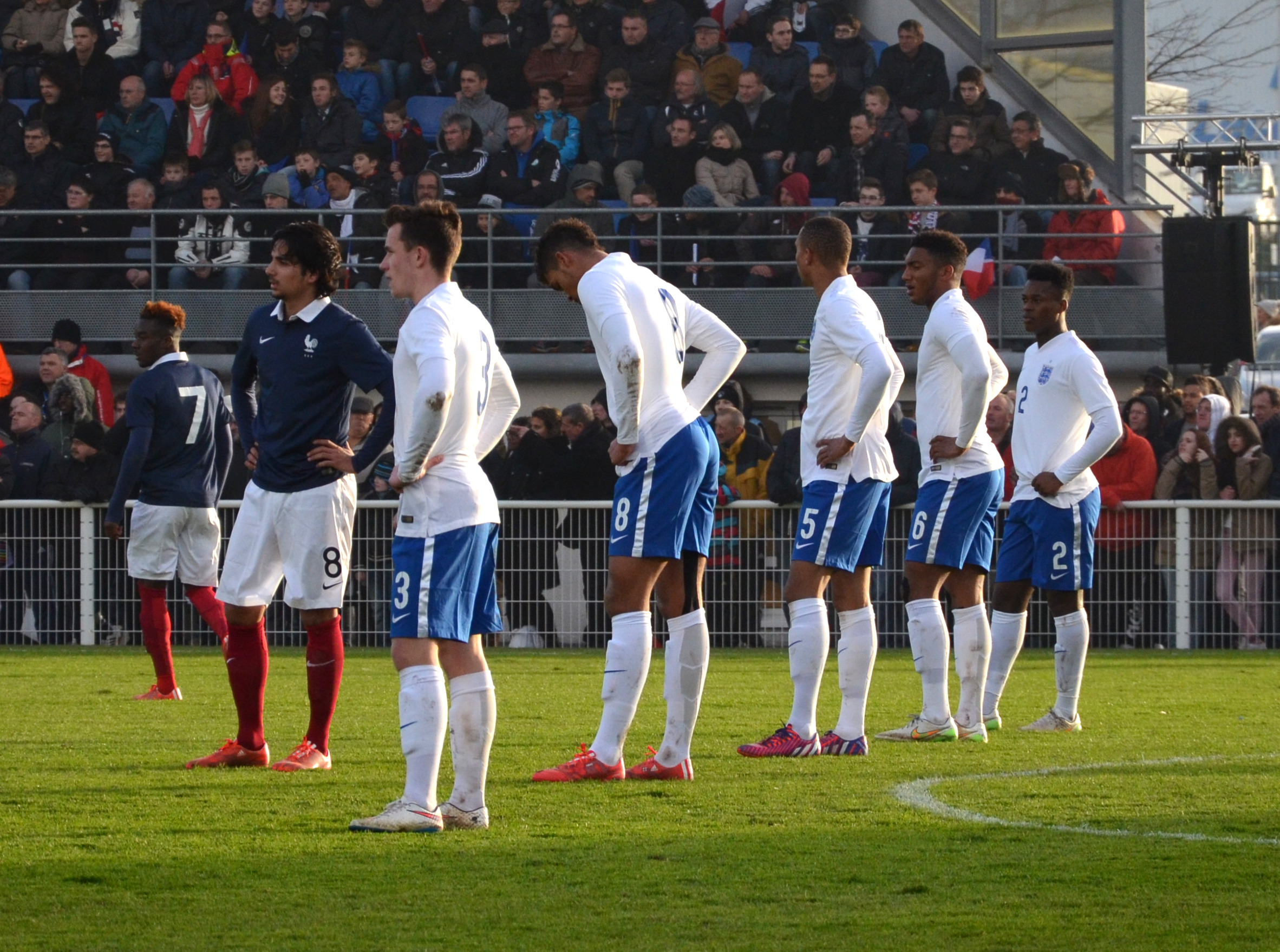
Smith-Brown (far right) playing for England's U19s in 2015 alongside Ben Chilwell, Ruben Loftus-Cheek, Brendan Galloway and Joe Gomez

=== Manchester City ===
Smith-Brown joined the Manchester City youth academy at the age of 5 from Fletcher Moss Rangers He has played at multiple positions at the youth level including full back, wing back, and midfielder, and made his U18 debut at the age of 15. He was made a captain of the U18 team, leading them to a league title in 2013–14 season.

==== Loans ====
Smith-Brown was loaned to Dutch Eerste Divisie team NAC Breda for the 2016–17 season. He scored his first goal on 12 August, in a 2–1 win over Achilles '29.

In July 2017, Smith-Brown joined Scottish Premiership club Heart of Midlothian on a season-long loan. On 29 January, having struggled due to injury, he was recalled by Manchester City. In total he made three appearances for Hearts.

On 29 January 2018, Smith-Brown moved on loan to Oxford United until the end of the 2017–18 season, in which time he made nine appearances.

=== Plymouth Argyle ===
Smith-Brown signed for Plymouth Argyle on 26 June 2018 for an undisclosed fee, which manager Derek Adams later perhaps erroneously reported as "£10". He was released by the club in January 2020.

=== Oldham Athletic ===
He joined Oldham Athletic on a season long loan in August 2019 but the loan was terminated in January 2020 in which he returned to Plymouth Argyle.

=== South Shields ===
On 6 October 2020, Smith-Brown signed for non-league side South Shields.

=== Farsley Celtic ===
On 30 October 2020, Smith-Brown joined Farsley Celtic.

=== Stalybridge Celtic ===
In July 2021 he joined Stalybridge Celtic.

He was released by the club in June 2022.

== Career statistics ==
As of 14 April 2021

Appearances and goals by club, season and competition
Club	Season	League			National Cup		League Cup		Other		Total	
Club	Season	Division	Apps	Goals	Apps	Goals	Apps	Goals	Apps	Goals	Apps	Goals
Manchester City	2016–17	Premier League	0	0	0	0	0	0	0	0	0	0
Manchester City	2017–18	Premier League	0	0	0	0	0	0	0	0	0	0
Manchester City	Total		0	0	0	0	0	0	0	0	0	0
NAC Breda (loan)	2016–17	Eerste Divisie	29	1	0	0	0	0	1 (Note: Appearance in the Eerste Divisie promotion play-offs)	0	30	1
Heart of Midlothian (loan)	2017–18	Scottish Premiership	2	0	0	0	1	0	0	0	3	0
Oxford United (loan)	2017–18	League One	9	0	0	0	0	0	0	0	9	0
Plymouth Argyle	2018–19	League One	31	1	1	0	3	0	1 (Note: Appearance in the EFL Trophy)	0	36	1
Oldham Athletic (loan)	2019–20	League Two	6	0	0	0	1	0	2 (Note: Appearance in the EFL Trophy)	0	9	0
Farsley Celtic	2020–21	National League North	6	1	0	0	0	0	1 (Note: Appearance in the FA Trophy)	0	7	1
Career total			83	3	1	0	5	0	5	0	94	3
