= Michael Peck (footballer) =

English footballer

Mike Peck
Personal information
- Full name: Michael Dennis Peck
- Date of birth: 26 March 2001 (age 25)
- Place of birth: Bodmin, England
- Positions: Defender; defensive midfielder

Team information
- Current team: Missouri State Bears
- Number: 5

Youth career
- 2012–2018: Plymouth Argyle

College career
Years	Team	Apps	(Gls)
2021–2024	Missouri State Bears	55	(1)

Senior career*
Years	Team	Apps	(Gls)
2018–2020	Plymouth Argyle	0	(0)
2019	→ Dorchester Town (loan)	3	(1)
2019–20	→ Tiverton Town (loan)		
2020–21	Tiverton Town		
- * Club domestic league appearances and goals as of 11:10, 29 September 2022 (UTC)

Michael Dennis Peck (born 26 March 2001) is a professional footballer who plays for the Missouri State Bears as a defender.

== Career ==
Peck made his professional debut for Plymouth Argyle on 13 November 2018 in a 2–0 EFL Trophy defeat against EFL League Two side Newport County. In November 2019, he joined Dorchester Town on loan, and, in December 2019, he joined Tiverton Town on a month's loan deal. The deal was later extended for another 28 days and later to the end of the season.

Following his release by Plymouth Argyle in summer 2020, he joined Tiverton Town permanently for a season, before joining Missouri State University's soccer team, the Missouri State Bears, in 2021.

== Career statistics ==
As of match played 13 November 2018

Appearances and goals by club, season and competition
Club	Season	League			FA Cup		League Cup		Other		Total	
Club	Season	Division	Apps	Goals	Apps	Goals	Apps	Goals	Apps	Goals	Apps	Goals
Plymouth Argyle
Plymouth Argyle	2018–19	League One	0	0	0	0	0	0	1 (Note: Appearance in EFL Trophy)	0	1	0
Career total			0	0	0	0	0	0	1	0	1	0
