= Rúben Lameiras =

Portuguese footballer (born 1994)

Personal information
- Full name: Rúben Barcelos de Sousa Lameiras
- Date of birth: 22 December 1994 (age 31)
- Place of birth: Lisbon, Portugal
- Height: 1.74 m (5 ft 9 in)
- Positions: Winger; attacking midfielder

Team information
- Current team: Al-Markhiya
- Number: 22

Youth career
- 2011–2014: Tottenham Hotspur

Senior career*
Years	Team	Apps	(Gls)
2014–2015	Tottenham Hotspur	0	(0)
2015	→ Åtvidaberg (loan)	11	(0)
2015–2017	Coventry City	56	(3)
2017–2019	Plymouth Argyle	75	(17)
2019–2021	Famalicão	33	(6)
2021–2023	Vitória SC	67	(5)
2023–2024	Chaves	5	(0)
2024	Casa Pia	15	(0)
2024–2025	Al-Sailiya	16	(2)
2026–	Al-Markhiya	0	(0)
- * Club domestic league appearances and goals as of 17 September 2024

Rúben Barcelos de Sousa Lameiras (born 22 December 1994) is a Portuguese professional footballer who plays for Al-Markhiya as a winger or attacking midfielder.

Formed at Tottenham Hotspur, he spent his early career in EFL League One, making 131 appearances and scoring 20 goals for Coventry City and Plymouth Argyle and winning the EFL Trophy with the former in 2017. From 2019, he played in the Primeira Liga for Famalicão, Vitória SC and Chaves and Casa Pia.

== Career ==
=== Tottenham Hotspur ===
Lameiras moved to Tottenham Hotspur's academy in July 2011 and signed a professional contract with the Premier League club in July 2014. He made eight appearances, including five starts, in the Under-21 Premier League in the 2014–15 season, scoring once in the process.

On 26 March 2015, Tottenham announced they had reached an agreement with Swedish club Åtvidabergs FF for the transfer of Lameiras on loan until June, with an option to extend the deal. He made his professional debut on 5 April, in a 1–0 loss away to IFK Göteborg in that season's Allsvenskan. After 14 appearances, he returned to Tottenham, where his contract expired on 30 June.

=== Coventry City ===
Lameiras signed a two-year deal with Coventry City on 24 July 2015, after impressing manager Tony Mowbray whilst on trial at the club. He made his debut in senior English football on 8 August, starting in a 2–0 win over Wigan Athletic at the Ricoh Arena in the first game of the League One season. A week later, he scored the first senior goal of his career, in a 4–0 away win over Millwall.

Lameiras scored three goals in six games as Coventry won the 2016–17 EFL Trophy. He played the full 90 minutes of the final on 2 April at Wembley Stadium, a 2–1 win over Oxford United.

=== Plymouth Argyle ===
On 8 June 2017, after the Sky Blues' relegation from League One, free agent Lameiras joined newly promoted club Plymouth Argyle. He made his debut for the Pilgrims on 5 August as a 72nd-minute substitute for Jake Jervis in a 2–1 loss at Peterborough United, and afterwards he was praised by his midfield partner Graham Carey. On 4 May 2019, Lameiras was awarded the Plymouth Argyle Player of the Season award following a career-best campaign in his second season as a Pilgrim, having been involved directly in 35% of the Pilgrims' competitive goals – netting 11 times in League One and providing nine assists. He was offered a new contract by Plymouth Argyle at the end of the 2018–19 season.

=== Famalicão ===
After two years in Devon, Lameiras returned to his home country of Portugal to play for newly promoted to the Primeira Liga Famalicão, with whom he signed a four-year contract on 24 June 2019. He made his debut on 10 August in the team's first top-flight game for 25 years, starting in a 2–0 win at Santa Clara; on 23 September he scored his first goal to equalise in a 2–1 win at Sporting CP.

=== Vitória SC ===
On 8 January 2021, Lameiras joined fellow Primeira Liga side Vitória SC on a three-and-a-half-year deal, agreeing a contract with a €50 million release clause. He played 11 remaining games of the season, scoring a consolation in a 4–2 home loss to Gil Vicente on 14 March.

Lameiras played his first game in European competition on 21 July 2022, scoring a fourth-minute opener in a 3–0 win over Hungary's Puskás Akadémia at the Estádio D. Afonso Henriques in the second qualifying round of the UEFA Europa Conference League.

=== Chaves ===
On 21 August 2023, Vitória SC announced that Lameiras' contract had been terminated by mutual agreement, allowing him to join fellow Primeira Liga club Chaves on a one-year deal. Vitória kept 50% of the player's economic rights.

=== Casa Pia ===
On 18 January 2024, after making just five appearances for Chaves, Lameiras moved to fellow Primeira Liga club Casa Pia, signing a one-and-a-half-year contract.

=== Al-Sailiya ===
In September 2024, Lameiras joined Qatari Second Division club Al-Sailiya.

== Career statistics ==
As of match played 26 August 2023

Appearances and goals by club, season and competition
Club	Season	League			National cup (Note: Includes FA Cup and Taça de Portugal)		League cup (Note: Includes EFL Cup and Taça da Liga)		Continental		Other		Total	
Club	Season	Division	Apps	Goals	Apps	Goals	Apps	Goals	Apps	Goals	Apps	Goals	Apps	Goals
Åtvidaberg (loan)	2015	Allsvenskan	11	0	0	0	—		—		—		11	0
Coventry City	2015–16	League One	29	2	1	0	1	0	—		1 (Note: Appearance(s) in EFL Trophy)	0	32	2
Coventry City	2016–17	League One	27	1	2	0	2	1	—		6	3	37	5
Coventry City	Total		56	3	3	0	3	1	—		7	3	69	7
Plymouth Argyle	2017–18	League One	34	6	0	0	1	0	—		2	0	37	6
Plymouth Argyle	2018–19	League One	41	11	2	1	0	0	—		2	0	45	12
Plymouth Argyle	Total		75	17	2	1	1	0	—		4	0	82	18
Famalicão	2019–20	Primeira Liga	22	2	4	0	1	0	—		—		27	2
Famalicão	2020–21	Primeira Liga	11	4	1	0	0	0	—		—		12	4
Famalicão	Total		33	6	5	0	1	0	—		—		39	6
Vitória SC	2020–21	Primeira Liga	20	1	0	0	0	0	—		—		20	1
Vitória SC	2021–22	Primeira Liga	28	3	1	0	3	0	—		—		32	3
Vitória SC	2022–23	Primeira Liga	19	1	1	0	1	0	4 (Note: Appearance(s) in UEFA Europa Conference League)	1	—		25	2
Vitória SC			67	5	2	0	4	0	4	1	—		77	6
Chaves	2023–24	Primeira Liga	1	0	0	0	0	0	—		—		1	0
Career total			243	31	12	1	9	1	4	1	11	3	279	37

== Honours ==
Coventry City

- EFL Trophy: 2016–17

Individual

- Plymouth Argyle Player of the Season: 2018–19
- Primeira Liga Goal of the Month: September 2019
