= Graham Carey =

Irish footballer (born 1989)

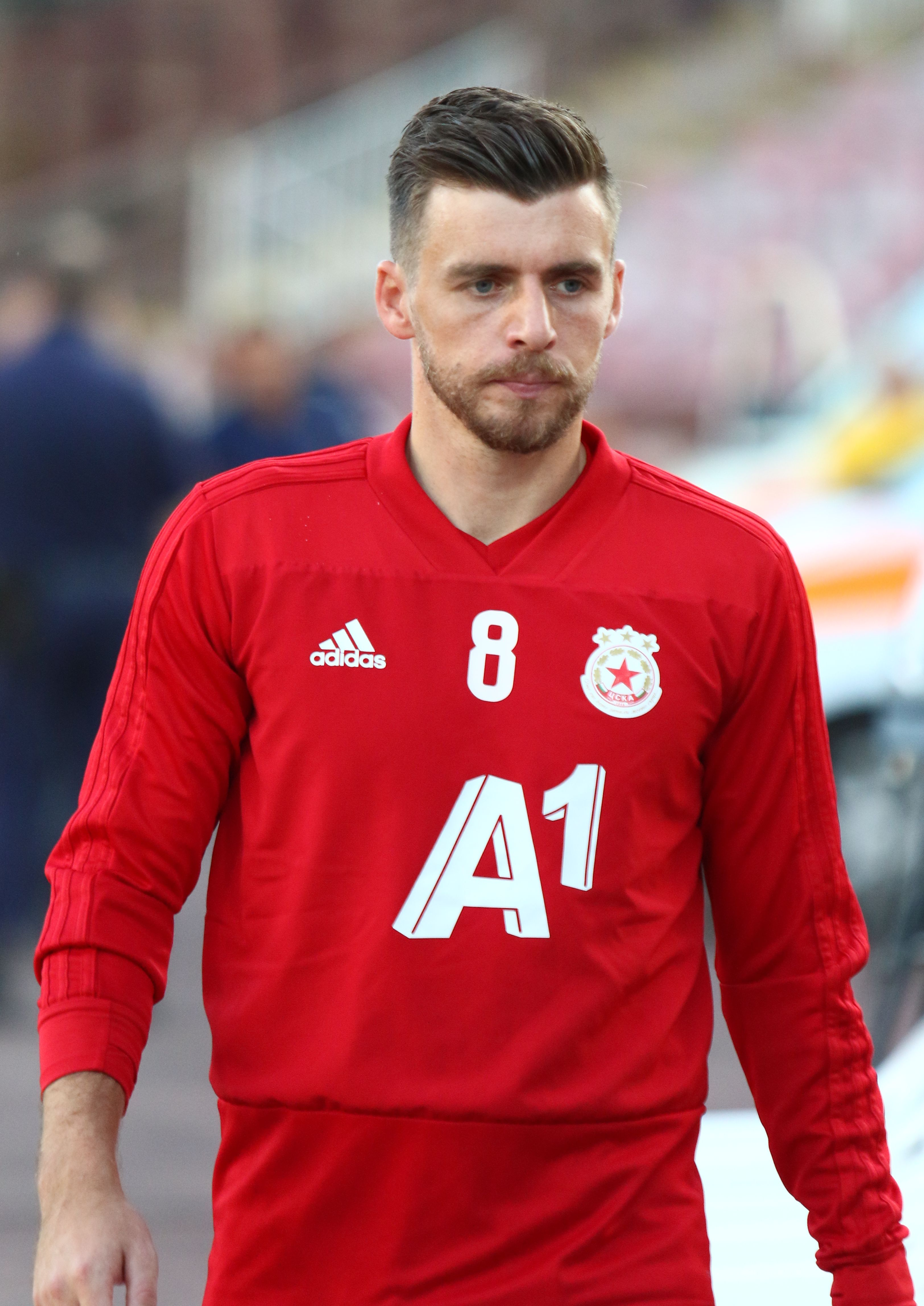
- Carey in 2019

Personal information
- Full name: Graham Carey
- Date of birth: 20 May 1989 (age 37)
- Place of birth: Blanchardstown, Ireland
- Height: 1.83 m (6 ft 0 in)
- Position: Winger

Youth career
- –2005: Shelbourne
- 2005–2008: Celtic

Senior career*
Years	Team	Apps	(Gls)
2008–2011	Celtic	0	(0)
2009	→ Bohemians (loan)	15	(2)
2010	→ St Mirren (loan)	15	(3)
2010–2011	→ Huddersfield Town (loan)	19	(2)
2011–2013	St Mirren	55	(3)
2013–2015	Ross County	58	(5)
2015–2019	Plymouth Argyle	174	(45)
2019–2022	CSKA Sofia	72	(6)
2022–2025	St Johnstone	100	(9)
2025–2026	Livingston	7	(1)
2026	→ Dunfermline Athletic (loan)	1	(0)

International career
2009–2010	Republic of Ireland U21	6	(3)
- * Club domestic league appearances and goals as of 12:05, 29 March 2026 (UTC)

Graham Carey (born 20 May 1989) is an Irish professional footballer who last played for Scottish Championship side Livingston. He plays as a left sided attacking midfielder.

Carey joined Celtic in 2005 from Shelbourne's youth team and made his Celtic debut in 2009 against Rapid Vienna in the UEFA Europa League, He has played six times for the Republic of Ireland Under 21 team, having been capped at all International levels from under 15. During his time at Celtic Carey had loan spells with Bohemians in the League of Ireland, St Mirren and Huddersfield Town in League One in England. He then signed for St Mirren permanently and in 2013, moved to Ross County where he spent two seasons. After spending four seasons with Plymouth Argyle, scoring 49 goals in 200 appearances, he moved to Bulgarian top flight club CSKA Sofia in 2019 for 3 seasons and won the Bulgarian Cup with them. Carey then returned to Scotland in 2022 with St Johnstone and amassed 117 appearances and 12 goals in 3 seasons with the Perth side before their relegation.

In 2010, ex Scotland and then Motherwell manager Craig Brown, stated Carey "looks a real talent" and said he "is the kind of player fans like to watch".

== Club career ==
=== Celtic ===
In 2005, Carey signed for Celtic from Shelbourne's youth set up. He made his senior Celtic debut as a substitute against Rapid Vienna in the Europa League on 17 December 2009, a match which Celtic drew 3–3. He was regularly named as a substitute for Celtic in the 2009–10 SPL season before being loaned out to St Mirren in February 2010, and English League One team Huddersfield Town in August 2010.

Carey was a regular for the youth team and reserves during his time in Glasgow and worked under Willie McStay, Danny McGrain and Neil Lennon. He later said he was disappointed to have never made it into the first team during his time at Celtic.

==== Bohemians (loan) ====
In a bid to get more first team experience for Carey, Celtic boss Gordon Strachan loaned him out to League of Ireland Champions Bohemians in February 2009. He played his first league match against Derry City on 13 March and scored his first league goal against St. Patrick's Athletic on 11 April. Carey was deemed an instant hit and was described as the star of the show having impressed during the local derby against St. Patrick's Athletic.

Bohemians manager Pat Fenlon was keen to extend Carey's loan deal which expired in July until the end of the season. The talented winger was also due to be out of contract at Celtic in July and was aiming to secure a place in new manager Tony Mowbray's team due to impressive performances with Bohemians and the Republic of Ireland under 21s.

Carey was due to play on the left wing in Bohemians' Champions League qualifiers against the Austria Champions Red Bull Salzburg, but the loan deal could not be extended in time. He made 20 appearances and scored five goals in all competitions for Bohemians and capped his loan period by winning a League of Ireland Medal.

==== St Mirren (loan) ====
Carey joined St Mirren on loan on 1 February 2010, until the summer of 2010. He made his debut against St Johnstone on 10 February in the SPL. He came on as a 60th-minute substitute and curled in a free kick which led to the equalising goal for Michael Higdon. He was described as having "impressed" on his debut. Saints manager Gus McPherson said in his post match interview "Graham Carey had some good delivery from the wider area. He's only been with us for a week and we hope he'll be a good addition for us."

Carey scored his first goal for St Mirren on 6 March 2010, when he scored from a free kick against Rangers. After the match, he said he copied Cristiano Ronaldo's free kick technique. A few weeks later, Carey started against Rangers, in the Scottish League Cup Final, but the match ended in a 1–0 loss for St Mirren.

Carey scored a 35-yard free kick against Hearts in the SPL on 3 April, and was commended by the St Mirren manager Gus MacPherson who said "It was a wonder strike from Graham. When he picks up the ball there's excitement as the crowd sense something may happen. He's always more than capable with his excellent delivery from set-pieces." On 24 April 2010, Carey helped set up the winning goal for Andy Dorman as St Mirren beat Kilmarnock 1–0 and after being substituted, received a standing ovation from the St Mirren fans.

Carey won the SPL Young Player of the Month award for April 2010 and St Mirren manager Gus MacPherson added that he was keen to keep him at the club. His successful loan spell at St Mirren attracted interest from Premier League clubs Wigan Athletic, Wolves and Blackpool as well as Ipswich Town in the Championship. He was offered a two-year contract extension by Celtic.

==== Huddersfield Town (loan) ====
On 14 July 2010, Carey signed on loan for League One outfit Huddersfield Town until January 2011. Huddersfield boss Lee Clark said "Graham will bring brilliant versatility to the squad – he can play anywhere up the left side of the pitch.... He has a terrific left foot and he looks as elegant as you would expect from a quality left-footed player". Carey made an immediate impact with Huddersfield scoring a low left footed drive from 20 yards against Bury in a pre-season friendly on 19 July 2010.

He made his first appearance for the Terriers as a substitute in a 1–0 win against Carlisle United at Brunton Park in the League Cup. He made his first League One start in the 4–2 loss against Peterborough United at London Road Stadium. Carey while playing as a left back, provided an assist to Jordan Rhodes from a well worked corner and scored a 25-yard free kick to make the score 2–0 to the Terriers. On 28 August 2010, he started for Huddersfield against Charlton Athletic, on the left side of midfield and was awarded Man of the Match for his efforts, including setting up two goals during the match.

Huddersfield manager Lee Clark wanted to keep Carey after his loan deal expired in January 2011, but despite talks of extending the deal to the end of the season, terms were not agreed, and he returned to Celtic. He made 23 starts and three substitute appearances for the Yorkshire club, scoring two goals.

=== St Mirren ===
On 8 July 2011, Carey re-signed for St Mirren permanently, having had a successful loan spell in the 2009–10 season. St Mirren Manager Danny Lennon said: "It's great to get Graham in. I believe in wider areas we let ourselves down last season and he has a left foot to die for. That type of quality is very scarce. He's an intelligent footballer and will be a major addition to the squad. He is very good in dead-ball situations." On 11 December 2011, Carey scored what was described as a "blistering free kick" to earn St Mirren a point against Aberdeen. He scored again for St Mirren to earn another draw against Dundee United on 28 December 2011 and also provided the assist to Thompson for the first goal in a 2–2 draw. Following the match, the club's supporters named Carey as the Paisley 'Ronaldo'. A few weeks later, on 17 January 2012, Carey scored in the fourth round replay of the Scottish Cup, in a 1–0 win over Hamilton Academical, to send the club through to the next round. In the quarter final of the Scottish Cup, he scored against Hearts, in a 2–2 draw to earn a replay.

In the 2012–13 season, Carey missed the opening game of the season, due to a hamstring problem. In the Scottish League Cup Final, Carey come on a substitute in the 81st minute for John McGinn, as St Mirren won 3–2 against Hearts, winning the trophy for the first time. On 13 May 2013, Carey's goal against Hearts in February 2010, was voted as the Scottish Premier League goal of the Season for 2012–13. The goal has been described as an astonishing wonder goal, which was a 35-yard strike after he collected the ball from his own half, played a one two then hits the top right hand corner. At the time of the goal, Carey's shooting skill was praised by Lennon. while he described it himself as a "wonderful strike".

On 15 May 2013, it was confirmed that Carey would be released at the end of the season by St Mirren along with Sam Parkin. Following his release, sources revealed that Carey had wanted to leave the club in January and had request a transfer, but this was rejected. He was also linked a move to England to kickstart his career.

=== Ross County ===
After leaving St Mirren, Carey went on trial with Dundee United After three weeks at the club, Carey's trial at Dundee United came to an end after the club were indecisive with their interests signing him.

On 30 July 2013, Carey, alongside Brian McLean joined Ross County. He made his debut, in the opening game of the season, a 2–1 loss against Celtic In the next game, Carey scored his first goal for the club, scoring with a deflected shot from outside the area, in a 3–1 loss against Partick Thistle. He then scored his second goal of the season three months later on 23 November 2013, in a 2–2 draw against Hearts. Carey's third goal of the season came on 4 January 2014, in a 1–0 win over St Johnstone. Carey made thirty-eight appearances, scoring three times in all competitions, having missed two league games, due to injuries.

Ahead of the 2014–15 season, Carey signed a new contract with Ross County on 7 August 2014, just three days before the season started. Under the new management of Jim McIntyre following the sacking of Derek Adams after five defeats, Carey played in an unfamiliar role as a left-back. He scored his first goal of the season in a 2–2 draw against St Mirren on 25 October 2014. Two weeks later on 8 November 2014, Carey scored his second goal of the season, in a 3–0 win over Kilmarnock.

At the end of the 2014–15 season, Carey was released by the "Staggies".

=== Plymouth Argyle ===
On 2 July 2015, Carey signed for Football League Two club Plymouth Argyle on a one-year contract. Carey scored on his debut in a 2–0 win at AFC Wimbledon on the first day of the season. His scoring run continued with four goals in his first five league games for the club.

Carey enjoyed an excellent first season at Plymouth, scoring 12 goals in 46 games and winning the club's Player of the Year award. Carey was also included into the English League Two Team of the Season for the 2016–17 season, along with teammates Sonny Bradley and Luke McCormick, after 15 goals and 15 assists in all competitions.

On 29 June 2017, despite interest from other clubs and speculation that he could move on after his contract expired, Carey signed a new contract at Argyle keeping him at the club where he gained cult status amongst the supporters.

His 2017–18 season saw Carey transfer his excellent League Two form into League One, particularly during the second half of the season. From the 4–1 victory against Oldham Athletic until the defeat to Northampton, Carey operated as an inside forward alongside Ruben Lameiras to great effect. Between them they created more than half of Argyle's goal scoring chances and were directly involved in 26 of the team's 35 goals during that time.

Carey struggled during the first half of the 2018–19 season, with his goal return falling dramatically, however despite the collapse in goals Carey remained an Argyle fan favourite and his drop in form and his inferior performances stemmed largely from a tactical switch by manager Derek Adams, which saw the Irishman operate from wider, deeper positions.

He was offered a new contract by Plymouth Argyle at the end of the 2018–19 season, but left the club after his contract expired.

In all competitions Carey made 200 appearances, scored 49 goals and assisted a further 58 goals in his time at the club.

=== CSKA Sofia ===
Carey joined Bulgarian club CSKA Sofia on a free transfer after signing a two-year deal on 11 June 2019. He made his official debut on 9 July 2019, in the 4–0 home win over Montenegrin club Titograd in a UEFA Europa League qualifying round match. Carey found the net for the first time on 14 December 2019, in the 4–0 victory over Dunav Ruse in a league game.

On 19 May 2021, Carey was part of the starting line up as CSKA Sofia beat Arda Kardzhali 1–0 to win the 2020–21 Bulgarian Cup. The result secured CSKA Sofia's place in the second qualifying round of 2021–22 UEFA Europa Conference League.

On 27 May 2021, Carey signed a new contract with CSKA Sofia; the length of the contract was not disclosed.

On 16 September 2021, Carey scored CSKA Sofia's first ever goal in the 2021–22 UEFA Conference League group stage against Roma in the Stadio Olimpico, lashing the ball into the top left corner. Roma went on to win the opening group game 5–1.

=== St Johnstone ===
On 1 July 2022, Carey returned to Scottish football after signing for Scottish Premiership side St Johnstone on a two-year deal.

=== Livingston ===
He signed for Livingston in 2025, but left the club in May 2026 following the expiration of his contract.

== International career ==
Carey has represented the Republic of Ireland at youth, under-17 and under-19 level. He has six Under-21 caps. His debut for the Under-21s came under Don Givens in February 2009 at Turners Cross against Germany. He scored his first goal at that level away to Georgia with an impressive 18-yard left footed strike after a clever one two with Cillian Sheridan.

== Style of play ==
Carey's preferred and most effective position is playing as a No 10 behind the striker, allowing him the freedom to move around the field and get on the ball. He can also play on the left or right side of midfield. He is very direct in his play and attacks defenders at every opportunity, while being a set-piece specialist his crossing has been described as "unbelievable". While at St Mirren, Carey was used as a left back and as a wing back on the left side.

Carey is also noted for his accurate set piece and crossing delivery as well as his long range shooting, particularly with his left foot. His former St Mirren teammate, and former Scotland international, Gary Teale said "You will go a long way to come across a better left foot than Graham's. In a tight game, if you are giving someone like that an opportunity, then that can be the difference."

== Career statistics ==
As of match played on 8 November 2025

Appearances and goals by club, season and competition
Club	Season	League			National Cup		League Cup		Other		Total	
Club	Season	Division	Apps	Goals	Apps	Goals	Apps	Goals	Apps	Goals	Apps	Goals
Celtic	2008–09	Scottish Premier League	0	0	0	0	0	0	0	0	0	0
Celtic	2009–10	Scottish Premier League	0	0	0	0	0	0	1 (Note: Appearance in UEFA Europa League)	0	1	0
Celtic	Total		0	0	0	0	0	0	1	0	1	0
Bohemians (loan)	2009	League of Ireland Premier Division	15	1	1	1	2	2	0	0	18	4
St Mirren (loan)	2009–10	Scottish Premier League	15	3	1	0	1	0	—		17	3
Huddersfield Town (loan)	2010–11	Football League One	19	2	4	0	1	0	2 (Note: Appearances in Football League Trophy / EFL Trophy)	1	26	3
St Mirren	2011–12	Scottish Premier League	29	2	6	2	1	0	—		36	4
St Mirren	2012–13	Scottish Premier League	26	1	2	0	5	0	—		33	1
St Mirren	Total		55	3	8	2	6	0	0	0	69	5
Ross County	2013–14	Scottish Premiership	36	3	1	0	1	0	—		38	3
Ross County	2014–15	Scottish Premiership	22	2	1	0	2	0	—		25	2
Ross County	Total		58	5	2	0	3	0	0	0	63	5
Plymouth Argyle	2015–16	Football League Two	42	11	1	0	1	0	5 (Note: Two appearances and one goal in Football League Trophy, three appearances in Football League play-offs)	1	49	12
Plymouth Argyle	2016–17	EFL League Two	46	14	5	1	1	0	2	0	54	15
Plymouth Argyle	2017–18	EFL League One	42	14	2	2	1	0	3	0	48	16
Plymouth Argyle	2018–19	EFL League One	44	6	2	0	2	0	1	0	49	6
Plymouth Argyle	Total		174	45	10	3	5	0	11	1	200	49
CSKA Sofia	2019–20	Bulgarian First League	25	4	4	0	—		5 (Note: Appearance in UEFA Europa League)	0	34	4
CSKA Sofia	2020–21	Bulgarian First League	24	1	3	0	—		6 (Note: Appearance in UEFA Europa League)	1	33	2
CSKA Sofia	2021–22	Bulgarian First League	23	1	5	0	—		11 (Note: Appearance in UEFA Conference League)	4	39	5
CSKA Sofia	Total		72	6	12	0	0	0	22	5	106	11
St Johnstone	2022–23	Scottish Premiership	30	3	1	0	4	1	—		35	4
St Johnstone	2023–24	Scottish Premiership	36	2	1	0	3	0	—		40	2
St Johnstone	2024–25	Scottish Premiership	34	4	4	1	4	1	—		42	6
St Johnstone	Total		100	9	6	1	11	2	0	0	117	12
Livingston	2025–26	Scottish Premiership	6	1	0	0	4	0	—		10	1
Career total			514	75	44	7	33	4	35	7	627	93

== Honours ==
Bohemians

- League of Ireland Premier Division: 2009

St Mirren

- Scottish League Cup: 2012–13

Plymouth Argyle

- EFL League Two runner-up: 2016–17

CSKA Sofia

- Bulgarian Cup: 2020–21

Individual

- PFA Team of the Year: 2016–17 League Two
- PFA Fans' Player of the Year: 2015–16 League Two
