= Cameron Sangster =

English footballer

Personal information
- Date of birth: 29 December 1999 (age 26)
- Place of birth: Newton Abbot, England
- Position: Central midfielder

Team information
- Current team: Buckland Athletic

Youth career
- 2008–2017: Kingskerswell & Chelston
- 2017–2019: Plymouth Argyle

Senior career*
Years	Team	Apps	(Gls)
2017–2019	Plymouth Argyle	2	(0)
2019	→ Dorchester Town (loan)		
2023–2024	Plymouth Parkway		
2025–	Buckland Athletic		
- * Club domestic league appearances and goals as of 21:06, 25 September 2025 (BST)

Cameron Sangster (born 29 December 1999) is an English footballer who plays as a midfielder for Buckland Athletic.

== Career ==
Cameron Sangster made his professional debut in a 4–1 win vs Oldham Athletic on 23 December 2017. Sangster replaced fellow midfielder David Fox, a player who was at the time twice his age, in the 89th minute of the EFL League One game. Sangster was the second apprentice to make a first team appearance for Argyle that season, following Michael Cooper's appearance vs Blackburn Rovers in October 2017.

On 30 August 2019 Sangster, alongside fellow midfielder Tom Purrington, joined Dorchester Town of the Southern League Premier South on loan until January 2020.

On 1 November 2019, Sangster left Argyle by mutual consent, cancelling his loan at Dorchester in the process. His contract at Argyle was due to run until June 2020, but was cancelled by Sangster so he could focus on his business interests.

On 24 October 2023, Sangster came out of retirement and signed for Plymouth Parkway after being on trial at the club.
