= 2015–16 Plymouth Argyle F.C. season =

English football club season

Plymouth Argyle
2015–16 season
- Chairman: James Brent
- Manager: Derek Adams
- Stadium: Home Park
- League Two: 5th
- FA Cup: 1st round (knocked out by Carlisle)
- Football League Cup: 1st round (knocked out by Gillingham)
- Football League Trophy: Southern Area Quarter-Final (knocked out by Millwall)
- Top goalscorer: League: Jake Jervis (12); All: Jake Jervis (14)
- Highest home attendance: League: 14,008 vs. Exeter (21 November 2015); All: 15,011 vs. Portsmouth (15 May 2016)
- Lowest home attendance: League: 6,071 vs. Carlisle (18 August 2015); All: 5,120 vs. Gillingham (11 August 2015)
- Average home league attendance: 8,798
Home colours	Away colours

The 2015–16 season was Plymouth Argyle's fifth consecutive season in League Two and their 130th year in existence. Along with competing in League Two, the club participated in the FA Cup, League Cup and Football League Trophy. The season covers the period from 1 July 2015 to 30 June 2016.

== Current squad ==
No.	Name	Pos.	Nat.	Place of Birth	Age	Apps	Goals	Signed from	Date signed	Fee	End
Goalkeepers
21	James Bittner	GK	(England)	Devizes	44	2	0	Salisbury City	8 July 2014	Free	2016
23	Luke McCormick	GK	(England)	Coventry	42	273	0	Oxford United	9 May 2013	Free	2016
31	Vincent Dorel	GK	(France)	Rennes	34	0	0	Poiré-sur-Vie	14 March 2016	Free	2017
Defenders
2	Kelvin Mellor	RB	(England)	Crewe	35	81	2	Crewe Alexandra	26 June 2014	Free	2016
3	Gary Sawyer	LB	(England)	Bideford	40	145	5	Leyton Orient	1 July 2015	Free	2017
4	Carl McHugh	CB	(Republic of Ireland)	Lettermacaward	33	83	7	Bradford City	16 June 2014	Free	2016
5	Curtis Nelson	CB	(England)	Newcastle-under-Lyme	32	232	7	Academy	8 October 2010	Trainee	2016
6	Peter Hartley	CB	(England)	Hartlepool	38	83	5	Stevenage	1 July 2014	Free	2016
16	Ben Purrington	LB	(England)	Exeter	29	33	1	Academy	21 May 2013	Trainee	Undisclosed
19	Aaron Bentley	CB	(England)	Plymouth	30	4	0	Academy	21 March 2014	Trainee	2016
28	Luke Croll	CB	(England)	Lambeth	31	3	0	Crystal Palace	20 November 2015	Loan	2 January 2016
28	Jordon Forster	CB	(Scotland)	Edinburgh	32	5	0	Hibernian	12 January 2015	Loan	7 May 2016
Midfielders
26	Oscar Threlkeld	RB	(England)	Bolton	31	25	1	Bolton	27 August 2015	Loan	9 April 2016
7	Lee Cox	DM	(England)	Leicester	35	52	0	Swindon Town	12 May 2014	Free	2016
8	Josh Simpson	CM	(England)	Harlow	39	27	1	Crawley Town	6 July 2015	Free	2016
10	Graham Carey	AM	(Republic of Ireland)	Blanchardstown	36	32	9	Ross County	3 July 2015	Free	2016
11	Gregg Wylde	LW	(Scotland)	Kirkintilloch	35	38	6	St Mirren	1 July 2015	Free	2016
20	Hiram Boateng	CM	(England)	Wandsworth	30	19	2	Crystal Palace	23 July 2015	Loan	2016
22	Callum Hall	LW	(England)	Plympton	29	0	0	Academy	1 June 2015	Trainee	2016
25	Ryan Lane	MF	(England)	Saltash	17	0	0	Academy	1 July 2013	Trainee	2016
Forwards
9	Reuben Reid	CF	(England)	Bristol	37	157	49	Yeovil Town	10 June 2014	Free	2016
14	Jake Jervis	CF	(England)	Wolverhampton	34	37	11	Ross County	29 June 2015	Free	2016
15	Tyler Harvey	CF/AM	(England)	Plymouth	30	58	3	Academy	1 July 2012	Free	2016
17	Ryan Brunt	CF	(England)	Birmingham	32	57	13	Bristol Rovers	20 January 2015	Free	2016
18	Deane Smalley	CF	(England)	Chadderton	37	19	2	Oxford United	20 May 2014	Free	2016
24	Louis Rooney	CF	(Northern Ireland)	Carrickfergus	29	1	2	Academy	1 June 2015	Trainee	2016
27	Craig Tanner	SS	(England)	Reading	31	38	6	Reading	5 August 2015	Loan	7 May 2016
7	Daniel Nardiello	ST	(Wales)	Coventry	43	4	0	Bury	27 January 2016	Loan	2016

Last updated: 6 March 2016
Source:Greens on Screen

== Pre-season ==
14 July 2015 Friendly	Elburton Villa	2–4	Plymouth Argyle	Plymouth
19:30 BST	Hulme 25'; Mann 89'	Report	Nelson 7'; Brunt 28' (pen.), 57'; Jervis 58'	Stadium: Haye Road; Attendance: 1,028; Referee: Adam Hopkins

18 July 2015 Friendly	Bideford	1–3	Plymouth Argyle	Bideford
15:00 BST	Downing 57'	Report	Jervis 4', 81'; Brunt 53'	Stadium: The Sports Ground; Attendance: 1,053; Referee: Lee Roberts

21 July 2015 Friendly	Bath City	3–3	Plymouth Argyle	Bath
19:45 BST	Davies 38'; Pratt 67'; Watkins 75'	Report	Jervis 7', 30'; Brunt 23'	Stadium: Twerton Park; Attendance: 523; Referee: Richard Hulme

22 July 2015 Friendly	Tavistock	0–8	Plymouth Argyle	Tavistock
19:30 BST		Report	Reid 11', 14', 82'; Rooney 22', 41', 90'; Lane 53' (pen.); Steer 37'	Stadium: Langsford Park; Attendance: 220

25 July 2015 Friendly	Plymouth Argyle	2–1	Reading	Plymouth
15:00 BST	Carey 52'; Reid 87'	Report	Semedo 79'	Stadium: Home Park; Attendance: 1,485; Referee: Lee Swabey

28 July 2015 Friendly	Torquay United	0–1	Plymouth Argyle	Torquay
19:30 BST		Report	Carey 86'	Stadium: Plainmoor; Attendance: 1,789 (884 away); Referee: Adam Hopkins

29 July 2015 Friendly	Truro City	1–1	Plymouth Argyle Reserves	Truro
19:00 BST	Wright 12'	Report	Rooney 66'	Stadium: Treyew Road; Attendance: 431 (270 away)

31 July 2015 Friendly	Forest Green Rovers	3–5	Plymouth Argyle	Stroud
19:30 BST	Jones 6'; Frear 14'; Parkin 20' (pen.)	Report	Jervis 32', 61'; Reid 36'; Boateng 52'; Sawyer 72'	Stadium: The New Lawn; Attendance: 517 (217 away)

3 August 2015 Friendly	Saltash United	0–4	Plymouth Argyle XI	Saltash
19:00 BST		Report	Jones ?'; Rooney ?', ?', ?'	Stadium: Kimberley Stadium

== League Two ==
=== League table ===
Pos	Team	Pld	W	D	L	GF	GA	GD	Pts	Promotion, qualification or relegation
3	Bristol Rovers (P)	46	26	7	13	77	46	+31	85	Promotion to EFL League One
4	Accrington Stanley	46	24	13	9	74	48	+26	85	Qualification for League Two play-offs (Note: Four teams play for one spot and promotion to Football League One.)
5	Plymouth Argyle	46	24	9	13	72	46	+26	81	Qualification for League Two play-offs
6	Portsmouth	46	21	15	10	75	44	+31	78	Qualification for League Two play-offs
7	AFC Wimbledon (O, P)	46	21	12	13	64	50	+14	75	Qualification for League Two play-offs

Updated to match(es) played on 7 May 2016. Source: BBC Sport
Rules for classification: 1) Points; 2) Goal difference; 3) Number of goals scored
(O) Play-off winners; (P) Promoted

=== Results by round ===
Round	1	2	3	4	5	6	7	8	9	10	11	12	13	14	15	16	17	18	19	20	21	22	23	24	25	26	27	28	29	30	31	32	33	34	35	36	37	38	39	40	41	42	43	44	45	46
Ground	A	H	H	A	H	A	A	H	A	H	H	A	H	A	A	H	A	H	H	A	H	A	H	A	A	H	H	A	H	H	A	A	H	A	H	A	H	A	H	A	H	A	A	H	A	H
Result	W	L	W	W	W	L	W	D	D	W	W	W	W	L	W	W	W	L	D	D	L	W	W	W	W	L	W	D	L	W	D	D	W	L	D	L	L	W	W	L	L	W	W	L	D	W
Position	7	8	6	3	2	3	2	2	4	2	1	1	1	1	1	1	1	1	1	2	3	1	1	1	1	1	1	2	2	2	2	2	2	3	3	3	4	4	3	4	5	5	4	5	6	5

Source: BBC SPORT
A = Away; H = Home; W = Win; D = Draw; L = Loss

=== Matches ===
On 17 June 2015, the fixtures for the forthcoming season were announced.

8 August 2015 1	AFC Wimbledon	0–2	Plymouth Argyle	Norbiton
15:00 BST	Fuller (yellow card) 90'	Report	Wylde 40'; Carey 49'	Stadium: Kingsmeadow; Attendance: 4,805 (932 away); Referee: Ben Toner

15 August 2015 2	Plymouth Argyle	1–2	Portsmouth	Plymouth
15:00 BST	Wylde 89'; Boateng (yellow card) 45'; Mellor (yellow card) 49'	Report	Tubbs Pen' (45); Roberts pen' (86); Davies (yellow card) 23'; Stockley (yellow card) 71'; Hollands (yellow card) 83'; Murphy (yellow card) 90'	Stadium: Home Park; Attendance: 11,476 (1,719 away); Referee: Stephen Martin

18 August 2015 3	Plymouth Argyle	4–1	Carlisle United	Plymouth
19:45 BST	Jervis 43', 65'; Reid 54'; Carey 56'; McCormick (yellow card) 90+4'	Report	90+3' Thompson	Stadium: Home Park; Attendance: 6,071 (69 away); Referee: Oliver Langford

22 August 2015 4	Northampton Town	0–2	Plymouth Argyle	Northampton
15:00 BST	Lelan (yellow card) 88' (red card) 90'; Diamond (yellow card) 90'	Report	Carey 39'; Jervis 71'; McHugh (yellow card) 54'	Stadium: Sixfields Stadium; Attendance: 4,505 (810 away); Referee: Nick Kinseley

29 August 2015 5	Plymouth Argyle	1–0	Newport County	Plymouth
15:00 BST	Carey 43'; McHugh (yellow card) 1'	Report		Stadium: Home Park; Attendance: 7,811 (291 away); Referee: Andy Davies

5 September 2015 6	Stevenage	2–1	Plymouth Argyle	Stevenage
15:00 BST	Ogilvie 6'; Whelpdale 38'; Wells (yellow card) 45'	Report	Tanner 54'	Stadium: Broadhall Way; Attendance: 3,560 (882 away); Referee: Gary Sutton

12 September 2015 7	Wycombe Wanderers	1–2	Plymouth Argyle	High Wycombe
15:00 BST	Banton 12'; Bean (yellow card) 26'	Report	Reid 4'; Jervis 32'; Sawyer (yellow card) 74'; Tanner (yellow card) 78'; Boateng (yellow card) 85'; Carey (yellow card) 90'	Stadium: Adams Park; Attendance: 4,223 (941 away); Referee: Tim Robinson

19 September 2015 8	Plymouth Argyle	1–1	Bristol Rovers	Plymouth
15:00 BST	Jervis 85'; McHugh (yellow card) 49'; Sawyer (yellow card) 60'; Nelson (yellow card) 76'; McCormick (yellow card) 90'; Cox (yellow card) 90'	Report	Harrison Pen' (90) (yellow card) 76'	Stadium: Home Park; Attendance: 10,633 (1,587 away); Referee: Chris Sarginson

26 September 2015 9	Mansfield Town	0–0	Plymouth Argyle	Mansfield
15:00 BST	Rose (yellow card) 80'	Report	Nelson (yellow card) 68'; Tanner (yellow card) 90'	Stadium: Field Mill; Attendance: 3,185 (463 away); Referee: Mark Brown

29 September 2015 10	Plymouth Argyle	2–1	Barnet	Plymouth
19:45 BST	Carey 53'; Jervis 60'	Report	McLean (yellow card) 7' (goal) 30'; Gambin (yellow card) 16'	Stadium: Home Park; Attendance: 6,115 (69 away); Referee: Simon Hooper

3 October 2015 11	Plymouth Argyle	2–1	Crawley Town	Plymouth
15:00 BST	Reid 43'; Boateng 89'; Sawyer (yellow card) 13'; Mellor (yellow card) 20'; McHugh (yellow card) 45'	Report	Deacon 85'; Jenkins (yellow card) 54'; Edwards (yellow card) 72'; Hancox (yellow card) 74'	Stadium: Home Park; Attendance: 7,173 (92 away); Referee: Stuart Attwell

11 October 2015 12	Notts County	0–2	Plymouth Argyle	Nottingham
14:30 BST	Reid 18' 87' (yellow card) 79'	Report	Hewitt (yellow card) 56'; McLeod (yellow card) 65'	Stadium: Meadow Lane; Attendance: 5,266 (826 away); Referee: Jeremy Simpson

17 October 2015 13	Plymouth Argyle	1–0	Accrington Stanley	Plymouth
15:00 BST	Reid 64'; Sawyer (yellow card) 29'; McHugh (yellow card) 69'	Report	Crooks (yellow card) 16'; Winnard (yellow card) 64'; Wakefield (yellow card) 74'; Wright (yellow card) 90'	Stadium: Home Park; Attendance: 7,865 (73 away); Referee: Nick Kinseley

20 October 2015 14	Oxford United	1–0	Plymouth Argyle	Oxford
19:45 BST	Sercombe 32'	Report	Nelson (yellow card) 6'; Carey (yellow card) 82'	Stadium: Kassam Stadium; Attendance: 7,007 (982 away); Referee: Rob Lewis

24 October 2015 15	Luton Town	1–2	Plymouth Argyle	Luton
15:00 BST	McQuoid 76'; Doyle (yellow card) 42'; Hall (yellow card) 84' (yellow-red card)	Report	McHugh 17'; Brunt 90+5'; Tanner (yellow card) 83'	Stadium: Kenilworth Road; Attendance: 8,703 (914 away); Referee: Ross Joyce

31 October 2015 16	Plymouth Argyle	2–0	Morecambe	Plymouth
15:00 BST	Carey 2' (yellow card) 42'; Tanner 12' (yellow card) 43'	Report	Goodall (yellow card) 27'	Stadium: Home Park; Attendance: 7,574 (87 away); Referee: Michael Bull

15 November 2015 17	York City	1–2	Plymouth Argyle	York
15:00 BST	Ben Godfrey 90+9'	Report	Jervis 19'; Carey 44'; Threlkeld (yellow card) 47'	Stadium: Bootham Crescent; Attendance: 3,654 (721 away); Referee: Richard Clark

21 November 2015 18	Plymouth Argyle	1–2	Exeter City	Plymouth
15:00 BST	Threlkeld 61'; Tanner (yellow card) 60'; Croll (yellow card) 71'	Report	Harley pen' (30) 39'	Stadium: Home Park; Attendance: 14,008 (968 away); Referee: Graham Scott

24 November 2015 19	Plymouth Argyle	1–1	Leyton Orient	Plymouth
19:45 BST	McHugh (yellow card) 73'; Nelson 81'; Sawyer (yellow card) 89'	Report	Simpson 4' (yellow card) 28'	Stadium: Home Park; Attendance: 6,469 (198 away); Referee: Andy Woolmer

28 November 2015 20	Dagenham & Redbridge	1–1	Plymouth Argyle	Dagenham
15:00 BST	Labadie 59'; Dikamona (yellow card) 86'	Report	Croll (yellow card) 61'; Sawyer (yellow card) 73'; Purrington (yellow card) 75'; Brunt 90+3'	Stadium: Victoria Road (Dagenham); Attendance: 2,344 (991 Away); Referee: Darren Deadman

12 December 2015 21	Plymouth Argyle	1–2	Cambridge United	Plymouth
15:00 GMT	Wylde 73'; Threlkeld (yellow card) 90+2'	Report	Williamson 6'; Corr (yellow card) 68'; Ledson (yellow card) 70'; Berry 86'	Stadium: Home Park; Attendance: 7,246 (away 164); Referee: Tim Robinson

19 December 2015 22	Hartlepool United	1–2	Plymouth Argyle	Hartlepool
15:00 GMT	Fenwick Pen' (76); Gray (yellow card) 46'	Report	McHugh 86'; Mellor (yellow card) 74' (goal) 86'	Stadium: Victoria Park; Attendance: 3,534 (away 587); Referee: Graham Salisbury

26 December 2015 23	Plymouth Argyle	1–0	Yeovil Town	Plymouth
15:00 GMT	Brunt 59'; Threlkeld (yellow card) 53'; Hartley (yellow card) 70'	Report	Sokolik (yellow card) 38'; Dickson (yellow card) 61'; Smith (yellow card) 87'	Stadium: Home Park; Attendance: 12,821 (away 553); Referee: Graham Salisbury

28 December 2015 24	Newport County	1–2	Plymouth Argyle	Newport
15:00 GMT	Boden 24'	Report	Jervis 48' (yellow card) 87'; Brunt 70'; Threlkeld (yellow card) 44'; Hartley (yellow card) 53'; Nelson (yellow card) 83'	Stadium: Rodney Parade; Attendance: 4,314 (away 1,400); Referee: Fred Graham

2 January 2016 25	Carlisle United	0–2	Plymouth Argyle	Blackburn
15:00 GMT	Ellis (yellow card) 55'; Archibald-Henville (yellow card) 89'	Report	Brunt 26'; Nelson (yellow card) 59'; Wylde 90+2'	Stadium: Ewood Park; Attendance: 4,415 (away 801); Referee: Sebastian Stockbridge

12 January 2016 26	Plymouth Argyle	1–2	Northampton Town	Plymouth
19:45 BST	Wylde 83'; Hartley (yellow card) 88'; Brunt (yellow card) 90'	Report	Diamond (yellow card) 15'; Collins 38'; Maloney (yellow card) 56'; Richards 58'; Holmes (yellow card) 65'; O'Toole (yellow card) 87'	Stadium: Home Park; Attendance: 9,241 (269 away); Referee: Keith Stroud

16 January 2016 27	Plymouth Argyle	3–2	Stevenage	Plymouth
15:00 BST	McHugh 3'; Wylde 17'; Tanner 40' (yellow card) 77'	Report	Lee 6' 49'; Tonge (yellow card) 60'; Parrett (yellow card) 64'	Stadium: Home Park; Attendance: 9,546 (92 away); Referee: James Linington

23 January 2016 28	Bristol Rovers	1–1	Plymouth Argyle	Bristol
15:00 BST	Parkes (yellow card) 10'; Bodin 79'	Report	Simpson 88'; Mellor (yellow card) 90'	Stadium: Memorial Stadium; Attendance: 10,190 (1,585 away); Referee: Oliver Langford

30 January 2016 29	Plymouth Argyle	0–1	Wycombe Wanderers	Plymouth
15:00 BST	Threlkeld (yellow card) 44'; McHugh (yellow card) 45'	Report	Ugwu 3'; Cowan-Hall (yellow card) 34'; Hayes (yellow card) 45'	Stadium: Home Park; Attendance: 8,458 (222 away); Referee: Phil Gibbs

13 February 2016 30	Plymouth Argyle	3–0	Mansfield Town	Plymouth
15:00 BST	Wylde 33'; Brunt Pen' (36); Hartley (yellow card) 49'; Brunt 84'; Carey (yellow card) 87'	Report	Clements (yellow card) 65'	Stadium: Home Park; Attendance: 7,494 (190 away); Referee: Brendan Malone

20 February 2016 31	Crawley Town	1–1	Plymouth Argyle	Crawley
15:00 BST	Jones (yellow card) 58'; Tomlin (yellow card) 78'; Fenelon 83'	Report	Brunt 57' (yellow card) 77'; Forster (yellow card) 60'	Stadium: Broadfield Stadium; Attendance: 3,522 (1,503 away); Referee: Peter Bankes

23 February 2016 32	Yeovil Town	0–0	Plymouth Argyle	Yeovil
19:45 BST	Dolan (yellow card) 50'; Campbell (yellow card) 52'; Roberts (yellow card) 75'	Report	Nelson (yellow card) 34'; Forster (yellow card) 37'; Hartley (yellow card) 73'	Stadium: Huish Park; Attendance: 5,788 (2,331 away); Referee: Lee Collins

27 February 2016 33	Plymouth Argyle	1–0	Notts County	Plymouth
15:00 BST	Carey 47'; Sawyer (yellow card) 47'	Report	Carroll (yellow card) 90'	Stadium: Home Park; Attendance: 7,864 (219 away); Referee: Iain Williamson

1 March 2016 34	Barnet	1–0	Plymouth Argyle	Barnet
19:45 BST	Yiadom 69'	Report		Stadium: The Hive Stadium; Attendance: 2,209 (1,112 away); Referee: Michael Bull

5 March 2016 35	Plymouth Argyle	2–2	Oxford United	Plymouth
15:00 BST	Nelson 15'; Tanner 75'	Report	Hartley 12' (o.g.); Roofe 35'	Stadium: Home Park; Attendance: 10,091 (1,179 away); Referee: James Adcock

12 March 2016 36	Accrington Stanley	2–1	Plymouth Argyle	Accrington
15:00 BST	Kee pen' (85); McCartan 90+3' (yellow card) 90+4'	Report	Jervis 23'; Houghton (yellow card) 62'; Simpson (yellow card) 68'; Mellor (red card) 84'	Stadium: Crown Ground; Attendance: 2,044 (851 away); Referee: Mark Heywood

19 March 2016 37	Plymouth Argyle	0–1	Luton Town	Plymouth
15:00 BST	Purrington (yellow card) 86'	Report	Marriott 27'; Smith (yellow card) 59'; McGeehan (yellow card) 79'; Rea (yellow card) 89'	Stadium: Home Park; Attendance: 7,973 (554 away); Referee: Darren Bond

25 March 2016 38	Morecambe	0–2	Plymouth Argyle	Morecambe
15:00 BST	Kenyon (red card) 45'; Molyneux (yellow card) 45+3'	Report	Houghton 14'; Matt 47'; Carey (yellow card) 53'	Stadium: Globe Arena (football stadium); Attendance: 2,081 (627 away); Referee: David Webb

28 March 2016 39	Plymouth Argyle	3–2	York City	Plymouth
15:00 BST	Matt 21'; Reid Pen' (31); Hartley 42'	Report	Penn 52'; Summerfield Pen', 86'	Stadium: Home Park; Attendance: 8,571 (108 away); Referee: Dean Whitestone

2 April 2016 40	Exeter City	2–1	Plymouth Argyle	Exeter
15:00 BST	Watkins 80' 90+2'; Taylor (yellow card) 87'	Report	Forster (yellow card) 44'; Matt 57'	Stadium: St James Park (Exeter); Attendance: 7,177 (1,664 away); Referee: Keith Stroud

9 April 2016 41	Plymouth Argyle	1–2	AFC Wimbledon	Plymouth
15:00 BST	Carey 61'	Report	Taylor 30'; Akinfenwa 88'	Stadium: Home Park; Attendance: 8,852 (399 away); Referee: Darren Drysdale

16 April 2016 42	Portsmouth	1–2	Plymouth Argyle	Portsmouth
15:00 BST	Smith 37'	Report	Matt 86'; Wylde 89'	Stadium: Fratton Park; Attendance: 18,423 (3,083 away); Referee: Chris Sarginson

19 April 2016 43	Leyton Orient	1–3	Plymouth Argyle	Leyton
19:45 BST	James pen' (82)	Report	Hartley 45+2'; Jervis 78'	Stadium: Brisbane Road; Attendance: 4,908 (1,037 away); Referee: Tim Robinson

23 April 2016 44	Plymouth Argyle	2–3	Dagenham & Redbridge	Plymouth
19:45 BST	Hartley 65'; Carey 85'	Report	Dikamona 13'; Cash 24'; Doidge 41'	Stadium: Home Park; Attendance: 9,211 (69 away); Referee: James Adcock

30 April 2016 45	Cambridge United	2–2	Plymouth Argyle	Cambridge
15:00 BST	Ledson (yellow card) 82'; Williamson 84'; Spencer 86'; Norris (yellow card) 90'	Report	McHugh (yellow card) 7'; Boateng (yellow card) 60'; Matt 71'; Tanner (yellow card) 82'; Carey 90+2'	Stadium: Abbey Stadium; Attendance: 6,714 (away 1,567); Referee: Trevor Kettle

7 May 2016 46	Plymouth Argyle	5–0	Hartlepool United	Plymouth
15:00	Harvey 6', 25'; Rooney 58', 83'; Nelson 61'	Report		Stadium: Home Park; Attendance: 10,019 (521 away); Referee: Darren Deadman

=== Football League play-offs ===
12 May 2016 First leg	Portsmouth	2–2	Plymouth Argyle	Portsmouth
19:45 BST	McNulty 3'; Hollands (yellow card) 40'; Barton (yellow card) 45+4'; Roberts 51' (pen.)	Report	9' 19' Matt; (yellow card) 14' Carey; (yellow card) 50' Hartley; (yellow card) 60' Sawyer; (yellow card) 85' Purrington	Stadium: Fratton Park; Attendance: 17,622 (3,022 away); Referee: Oliver Langford

15 May 2016 Second leg	Plymouth Argyle	1–0	Portsmouth	Plymouth
18:00 BST	McHugh (yellow card) 29'; Hartley 90+1'	Report	(yellow card) 71' Close	Stadium: Home Park; Attendance: 15,011 (1,696 away); Referee: Paul Tierney

15 May 2016 Final	AFC Wimbledon	2-0	Plymouth Argyle	London
18:00 BST	Charles (yellow card) 67'; Taylor 78' (yellow card) 78'; Akinfenwa 90' (yellow card) 90'	Report	Wylde (yellow card) 62'	Stadium: Wembley Stadium; Attendance: 57,956; Referee: Iain Williamson

== League Cup ==
=== Matches ===
11 August 2015 First round	Plymouth Argyle	1–2	Gillingham	Plymouth
19:45 BST	Tanner 78'; Sawyer (yellow card) 50'	Report	Dack 85'; Hessenthaler 87' (yellow card) 36'	Stadium: Home Park; Attendance: 5,120; Referee: Kevin Johnson

== FA Cup ==
=== Matches ===
7 November 2015 1st Round	Plymouth Argyle	0–2	Carlisle United	Plymouth
15:00 BST	Mellor (yellow card) 22'; Carey (yellow card) 62'; McHugh (yellow card) 77'	Report	Raynes (yellow card) 15'; Hope 41'; Sweeney 23' (yellow card) 73'	Stadium: Home Park; Attendance: 6,005 (176 away); Referee: Charles Breakspear

== Football League Trophy ==
=== Matches ===
1 September 2015 First round	AFC Wimbledon	2–3	Plymouth Argyle	Norbiton
TBABST	Ade Azeez 7'; Lyle Taylor 25'	Report	Jake Jervis 38'; Ryan Brunt 52'; Carl McHugh 57' (yellow card) 81'; Mellor (yellow card) 79'	Stadium: Kingsmeadow; Attendance: 1,251 (356 away); Referee: Charles Breakspear

6 October 2015 Second round	Plymouth Argyle	2-0	Exeter City	Plymouth
19:45 BST	Boateng 32'; Tanner 49'	Report	Brown (yellow card) 65'; Moore-Taylor (yellow card) 78'	Stadium: Home Park; Attendance: 9,441 (877 away); Referee: Brendan Malone

10 November 2015 Area quarter-finals	Plymouth Argyle	3–5	Millwall	Plymouth
19:45 BST	Jervis 33' 85'; Carey 55'; Purrington (yellow card) 90'	Report	Gregory 21' 49' pen' (58); Beevers 43'; Aiden O'Brien 66'; Webster (yellow card) 90'	Stadium: Home Park; Attendance: 5,869 (295 away); Referee: James Linington

== Appearance / Goals / Disciplinary ==
No	Nat	Pos	Name	Appearances	Sub App	Goals	Booked	Sent off (straight red)
2	(England)	RB	Kelvin Mellor	44	4	1	6	1
3	(England)	LB	Gary Sawyer	49	0	0	10	0
4	(Republic of Ireland)	CB	Carl McHugh	40	3	4	12	0
5	(England)	CB	Curtis Nelson	53	0	3	7	0
6	(England)	CB	Peter Hartley	49	0	3	7	0
7	(England)	CM	Lee Cox	0	5	0	1	0
7	(Wales)	CM	Daniel Nardiello	0	4	0	0	0
8	(England)	CM	Josh Simpson	16	12	1	1	0
9	(England)	ST	Reuben Reid	24	7	7	1	0
10	(Republic of Ireland)	AM	Graham Carey	40	5	12	6	0
11	(Scotland)	LW	Gregg Wylde	39	11	7	0	0
14	(England)	ST	Jake Jervis	45	4	14	1	0
15	(England)	ST	Tyler Harvey	1	7	2	0	0
16	(England)	LB	Ben Purrington	7	9	0	4	0
17	(England)	ST	Ryan Brunt	19	20	10	2	0
18	(England)	ST	Deane Smalley	0	1	0	0	0
19	(England)	CB	Aaron Bentley	0	0	0	0	0
19	(Jamaica)	ST	Jamille Matt	11	2	7	0	0
20	(Ghana)	CM	Hiram Boateng	27	2	2	2	0
21	(England)	GK	James Bittner	1	0	0	0	0
22	(England)	LW	Callum Hall	0	0	0	0	0
23	(England)	GK	Luke McCormick	47	0	0	3	0
24	(Northern Ireland)	ST	Louis Rooney	1	0	2	0	0
26	(England)	RB	Oscar Threlkeld	19	9	1	5	0
27	(England)	SS	Craig Tanner	25	24	6	6	0
28	(England)	CB	Luke Croll	3	0	0	2	0
28	(Scotland)	CB	Jordon Forster	8	4	0	4	0
31	(England)	GK	Christian Walton	4	0	0	0	0
31	(France)	GK	Vincent Dorel	1	0	0	0	0
32	(England)	CM	Jordan Houghton	10	0	1	1	0

Last updated: 22 May 2016
Source:Greens on Screen

== Transfers ==
=== Transfers in ===
Date from	Position	Nationality	Name	From	Fee	Ref.
1 July 2015	LW	ENG	Callum Hall	Academy	Trainee	
1 July 2015	CF	ENG	Jake Jervis	Ross County	Free transfer	
1 July 2015	CF	NIR	Louis Rooney	Academy	Trainee	
1 July 2015	LB	ENG	Gary Sawyer	Leyton Orient	Free transfer	
1 July 2015	LW	SCO	Gregg Wylde	St Mirren	Free transfer	
3 July 2015	AM	IRL	Graham Carey	Ross County	Free transfer	
6 July 2015	CM	ENG	Josh Simpson	Crawley Town	Free transfer	
14 March 2016	GK	FRA	Vincent Dorel	Poiré-sur-Vie	Free transfer	

=== Transfers out ===
Date from	Position	Nationality	Name	To	Fee	Ref.
1 July 2015	RW	ENG	Lewis Alessandra	Rochdale	Free transfer	
1 July 2015	CM	ENG	River Allen	Gateshead (Note: Following Allen's release he joined Gateshead.)	Released	
1 July 2015	LM	ENG	Jason Banton	Wycombe Wanderers (Note: Following Banton's release he joined Wycombe Wanderers.)	Free transfer	
1 July 2015	CM	ENG	Dominic Blizzard	Free agent	Released	
1 July 2015	CF	ENG	Matt Lecointe	Free agent	Released	
1 July 2015	CF	GRN	Marvin Morgan	Havant & Waterlooville (Note: Following Morgan's release he joined Havant & Waterlooville.)	Free transfer	
1 July 2015	CM	ENG	Oliver Norburn	Free agent	Released	
1 July 2015	CB	ENG	Jamie Richards	Torquay United (Note: Following Richards' release he joined Torquay United.)	Released	
1 July 2015	CB	ENG	Paul Wotton	Retired	—N/a	
17 July 2015	CB	IRL	Anthony O'Connor	Burton Albion	Free transfer	
15 January 2016	CB	ENG	Aaron Bentley	Free agent	Released	
29 January 2016	CM	ENG	Lee Cox	Stevenage	Free transfer	

=== Loans in ===
Date from	Position	Nationality	Name	Loaned from	Date until	Ref.
23 July 2015	CM	ENG	Hiram Boateng	Crystal Palace	2 January 2016	
5 August 2015	SS	ENG	Craig Tanner	Reading	7 May 2016	
27 August 2015	CB	ENG	Oscar Threlkeld	Bolton Wanderers	9 April 2016	
19 November 2015	GK	ENG	Christian Walton	Brighton	2 January 2016	
20 November 2015	CB	ENG	Luke Croll	Crystal Palace	2 January 2016	
12 January 2016	CB	SCO	Jordon Forster	Hibernian	7 May 2016	
27 January 2016	ST	WAL	Daniel Nardiello	Bury	7 May 2016	
10 March 2016	CM	ENG	Jordan Houghton	Chelsea	31 May 2016	
11 March 2016	ST	JAM	Jamille Matt	Fleetwood	8 April 2016	
23 March 2016	CM	ENG	Hiram Boateng	Crystal Palace	7 May 2016	

=== Loans Out ===
Date from	Position	Nationality	Name	Loaned to	Date until	Ref.
26 November 2015	CM	ENG	Lee Cox	Stevenage	May 2016	
21 January 2016	ST	ENG	Deane Smalley	Newport	May 2016	
11 March 2016	ST	ENG	Tyler Harvey	Bath	8 April 2016	
