= 2014–15 Plymouth Argyle F.C. season =

English football club season

Plymouth Argyle
2014–15 season
- Chairman: James Brent
- Manager: John Sheridan
- Stadium: Home Park
- League Two: 7th
- FA Cup: Second round (knocked out by Sheffield United)
- Football League Cup: First round (knocked out by Leyton Orient)
- Football League Trophy: Southern Area semi-final (knocked out by Coventry)
- Top goalscorer: League: Reuben Reid (18); All: Reuben Reid (20)
- Highest home attendance: League: 11,418 vs. Exeter (16 August 2014); All: 14,175 vs. Wycombe (9 May 2015)
- Lowest home attendance: League: 5,657 vs. Wycombe (16 September 2014); All: 2,668 vs. Swindon (7 October 2014)
- Average home league attendance: 7,412
Home colours	Away colours

The 2014–15 season was Plymouth Argyle's 88th in the Football League and ninth in the fourth division of English football.

== First team squad ==
As of 26 June 2015

Note: Flags indicate national team as defined under FIFA eligibility rules; some limited exceptions apply. Players may hold more than one non-FIFA nationality.

No.	Pos.	Nation	Player
1	GK	ENG	James Bittner
2	DF	ENG	Kelvin Mellor
3	DF	ENG	Ben Purrington
4	MF	ENG	Lee Cox
5	DF	ENG	Curtis Nelson (captain)
6	MF	ENG	Oliver Norburn
7	FW	ENG	Lewis Alessandra
8	MF	ENG	Jason Banton
9	FW	ENG	Reuben Reid
10	FW	ENG	Marvin Morgan
11	MF	ENG	Dominic Blizzard
13	DF	ENG	Andy Kellett (on loan from Bolton Wanderers)
13	DF	ENG	Tareiq Holmes-Dennis (on loan from Charlton Athletic)
14	MF	ENG	Tyler Harvey
15	DF	ENG	Paul Wotton
16	DF	IRL	Carl McHugh
17	MF	ENG	Alex Bray (on loan from Swansea)

No.	Pos.	Nation	Player
17	MF	ENG	Bobby Reid (on loan from Bristol City)
18	FW	ENG	Matt Lecointe
19	MF	ENG	Nathan Thomas
19	DF	IRL	Anthony O'Connor (signed in January from Blackburn Rovers)
20	DF	NIR	Tom Flanagan (on loan from MK Dons)
20	DF	WAL	Gethin Jones (on loan from Everton)
21	MF	ENG	Olly Lee (on loan from Birmingham)
22	FW	ENG	Deane Smalley
23	GK	ENG	Luke McCormick (club-captain)
24	MF	ENG	River Allen
25	DF	ENG	Aaron Bentley
26	DF	ENG	Jamie Richards
27	MF	ENG	Drew Talbot (on loan from Chesterfield)
27	FW	ENG	Zak Ansah (on loan from Charlton)
28	DF	IRL	Anthony O'Connor (on loan from Blackburn Rovers)
28	FW	ENG	Ryan Brunt
29	DF	ENG	Peter Hartley (vice-captain)

Last updated: 26 June 2015
Source:Green Army 12

== Pre-season ==
=== Matches ===
15 July 2014	Tavistock	1–5	Plymouth Argyle	Tavistock
19:30 BST	Farnham	Report	Bentley; McHugh; Lecointe; Banton; Thomas	Stadium: Langsford Park

19 July 2014	Weymouth	2–2	Plymouth Argyle	Weymouth
15:00 BST	Shephard 8'; Yetton 30'	Report	Thomas pen' (14); Mellor 56'	Stadium: Bob Lucas Stadium; Attendance: 647

22 July 2014	Torquay United	0–0	Plymouth Argyle	Torquay
19:45 BST		Report		Stadium: Plainmoor; Attendance: 1,666 (580 away)

27 July 2014	Plymouth Argyle	0–4	Swansea City	Plymouth
17:00 BST		Report	Donnelly 9'; Amat 69'; Sigurdsson 71' 90'	Stadium: Home Park; Attendance: 4,943

30 July 2014	Plymouth Argyle	1–2	Yeovil Town	Plymouth
19:45 BST	Reid 9'	Report	Davis 29'; Hoskins 82'	Stadium: Home Park; Attendance: 1,735 (82 away); Referee: Lee Swabey

2 August 2014	Weston-super-Mare	1–2	Plymouth Argyle	Weston-super-Mare
15:00 BST	Ash 85'	Report	Reid 1'; Morgan 66'	Stadium: Woodspring Stadium

Last updated: 29 October 2014
Source:Greens on Screen

== League Two ==
=== League table ===
Pos	Team	Pld	W	D	L	GF	GA	GD	Pts	Promotion, qualification or relegation
5	Southend United (O, P)	46	24	12	10	54	38	+16	84	Qualification for League Two play-offs (Note: Four teams play for one spot and promotion to Football League One.)
6	Stevenage	46	20	12	14	62	54	+8	72	Qualification for League Two play-offs
7	Plymouth Argyle	46	20	11	15	55	37	+18	71	Qualification for League Two play-offs
8	Luton Town	46	19	11	16	54	44	+10	68	
9	Newport County	46	18	11	17	51	54	−3	65	

Updated to match(es) played on 23 May 2015. Source: BBC Sport
Rules for classification: 1) Points; 2) Goal difference; 3) Number of goals scored
(O) Play-off winners; (P) Promoted

=== Results by round ===
Round	1	2	3	4	5	6	7	8	9	10	11	12	13	14	15	16	17	18	19	20	21	22	23	24	25	26	27	28	29	30	31	32	33	34	35	36	37	38	39	40	41	42	43	44	45	46
Ground	A	H	H	A	H	A	A	H	H	A	H	A	H	A	H	A	H	A	H	A	H	A	H	A	A	H	H	A	H	A	H	A	H	A	H	A	A	H	A	H	A	H	H	A	H	A
Result	L	W	D	L	W	W	L	L	W	L	W	W	W	D	W	D	W	L	D	W	W	L	L	D	D	L	D	L	W	W	W	W	L	L	W	D	L	D	W	D	L	W	D	L	W	W
Position	22	10	10	14	10	8	10	13	12	14	8	6	5	6	6	6	4	6	6	5	5	6	7	7	7	9	10	10	8	7	7	6	8	8	7	7	9	8	7	7	8	7	7	7	7	7

A = Away; H = Home; W = Win; D = Draw; L = Loss

=== Matches ===
9 August 2014 1	Cambridge United	1–0	Plymouth Argyle	Cambridge
15:00	Coulson 61'	Report		Stadium: Abbey Stadium; Attendance: 6,009 (1,200 away); Referee: Graham Scott

16 August 2014 2	Plymouth Argyle	3–0	Exeter City	Plymouth
15:00	Harvey 14'; Reid 36'; Nelson 83'	Report		Stadium: Home Park; Attendance: 11,418; Referee: Roger East

19 August 2014 3	Plymouth Argyle	1–1	Stevenage	Plymouth
19:45	Smalley 90+8' (pen.)	Report	Calcutt 54'	Stadium: Home Park; Attendance: 6,240 (126 away); Referee: Kevin Johnson

23 August 2014 4	Bury	2–1	Plymouth Argyle	Bury
15:00	Soares 5'; Rose 15'	Report	Reid 66' (pen.)	Stadium: Gigg Lane; Attendance: 3,156 (625 away); Referee: James Adcock

30 August 2014 5	Plymouth Argyle	2–0	Southend United	Plymouth
15:00	Alessandra 52'; Reid 68'	Report	Bolger (red card) 15'	Stadium: Home Park; Attendance: 6,247; Referee: Brendan Malone

6 September 2014 6	Luton Town	0–1	Plymouth Argyle	Luton
12:15		Report	Blizzard 68'	Stadium: Kenilworth Road; Attendance: 7,864 (907 away); Referee: Mick Russell

13 September 2014 7	Morecambe	2–1	Plymouth Argyle	Morecambe
15:00	Ellison 19'; Devitt 83'	Report	Hartley 25'	Stadium: Globe Arena; Attendance: 1,865 (364 away); Referee: Chris Kavanagh

16 September 2014 8	Plymouth Argyle	0–1	Wycombe Wanderers	Plymouth
19:45		Report	Hayes 36'	Stadium: Home Park; Attendance: 5,657; Referee: Lee Collins

20 September 2014 9	Plymouth Argyle	2–0	Hartlepool United	Plymouth
15:00	Morgan 14'; Thomas 77'	Report		Stadium: Home Park; Attendance: 6,146 (67 away); Referee: James Linington

27 September 2014 10	Accrington Stanley	1–0	Plymouth Argyle	Accrington
15:00	Naismith 13'; O'Sullivan (yellow card) 64'	Report	Purrington (yellow card) 55'	Stadium: Crown Ground; Attendance: 1,511 (303 away); Referee: Niger Miller

4 October 2014 11	Plymouth Argyle	1–0	Shrewsbury Town	Plymouth
15:00	Reid 33'	Report	Woods (yellow card) 78'	Stadium: Home Park; Attendance: 6,229 (270 away); Referee: Stuart Attwell

11 October 2014 12	Tranmere Rovers	0–1	Plymouth Argyle	Tranmere
15:00	Odejayi (yellow card) 77'	Report	Reid 29'; Hartley (yellow card) 77'; O'Connor (yellow card) 88'	Stadium: Prenton Park; Attendance: 4,952 (700 away); Referee: David Coote

18 October 2014 13	Plymouth Argyle	1–0	Carlisle United	Plymouth
15:00	Alessandra 15'	Report	Archibald-Henville (yellow card) 20'; White (yellow card) 88'	Stadium: Home Park; Attendance: 6,529; Referee: Pat Miller

21 October 2014 14	AFC Wimbledon	0–0	Plymouth Argyle	London
19:45		Report	Nelson (yellow card) 55'; Reid (yellow card) 71'	Stadium: Kingsmeadow; Attendance: 4,318 (880 away); Referee: Graham Horwood

25 October 2014 15	Plymouth Argyle	3–0	Cheltenham Town	Plymouth
15:00	Reid 23'; Hartley 45'; Alessandra 76'	Report	Braham-Barrett (yellow card) 45'; Hanks (yellow card) 87'	Stadium: Home Park; Attendance: 6,837; Referee: A Davies

1 November 2014 16	Burton Albion	1–1	Plymouth Argyle	Burton
15:00	McDonald 32'	Report	O'Connor (yellow card) 59'; Reid pen' (70); Cox (yellow card) 90'; Banton (yellow card) 90'	Stadium: Pirelli Stadium; Attendance: 3,083 (775 away); Referee: Charles Breakspear

15 November 2014 17	Plymouth Argyle	3–0	Portsmouth	Plymouth
12:05	Reid 6' (pen.), 30'; Alessandra 21'	BBC Report		Stadium: Home Park; Attendance: 10,354; Referee: Andy Madley

22 November 2014 18	Mansfield Town	1–0	Plymouth Argyle	Mansfield
15:00	Oliver 45' (yellow card) 67'; Lambe (yellow card) 90+4'	Report	Reid (yellow card) 51'; Hartley (yellow card) 67'	Stadium: Field Mill; Attendance: 2,926 (589 away); Referee: Mark Brown

29 November 2014 19	Plymouth Argyle	1–1	York City	Plymouth
15:00	Reid 3'; Blizzard (yellow card) 52'; Mellor (yellow card) 90+3'	Report	Penn (yellow card) 39'; McCoy (yellow card) 79'; Hyde (yellow card) 90+4' (goal) 90+4'	Stadium: Home Park; Attendance: 6,808; Referee: Tim Robinson

13 December 2014 20	Northampton Town	2–3	Plymouth Argyle	Northampton
15:00	Toney 79'; Carter (yellow card) 81'; Murdoch 89'	Report	Hartley 2' (yellow card) 24'; Kellett 40'; Alessandra 62'	Stadium: Sixfields Stadium; Attendance: 4,318 (589 away); Referee: Fred Graham

20 December 2014 21	Plymouth Argyle	3–0	Dagenham & Redbridge	Plymouth
15:00	R Reid 41' pen' (78); B Reid 50' (yellow card) 79'	Report	Obileye (yellow card) 22'; Widdowson (yellow card) 78'	Stadium: Home Park; Attendance: 7,176 (65 away); Referee: C Berry

26 December 2014 22	Newport County	2–0	Plymouth Argyle	Newport
15:00	Zebroski 9'; Jones (yellow card) 33'; Byrne 82'	Report	Kellett (yellow card) 17'; O'Connor (yellow card) 53'	Stadium: Rodney Parade; Attendance: 5,020 (1,300 away); Referee: Stephen Martin

28 December 2014 23	Plymouth Argyle	1–2	Oxford United	Plymouth
15:00	Alessandra 19' (yellow card) 90'; Aaron Bentley (red card) 34'; B Reid (yellow card) 52'; Norburn (yellow card) 62'	Report	Campbell 70'; Roberts 84'; Long (yellow card) 32'	Stadium: Home Park; Attendance: 11,020 (394 away); Referee: Andy Davies

3 January 2015 24	York City	0–0	Plymouth Argyle	York
15:00	Zubar (red card) 22'	Report	Hartley (yellow card) 21'; O'Connor (yellow card) 29'	Stadium: Bootham Crescent; Attendance: 3,869; Referee: Darren Drysdale

10 January 2015 25	Southend United	0–0	Plymouth Argyle	Southend-on-Sea
15:00		Report	McHugh (yellow card) 67'	Stadium: Roots Hall; Attendance: 5'767; Referee: Darren Handley

17 January 2015 26	Plymouth Argyle	0–1	Luton Town	Plymouth
15:00	Lee (yellow card) 68'	Report	Drury 22'; Doyle (yellow card) 64'; Smith (yellow card) 86'	Stadium: Home Park; Attendance: 8,420; Referee: Keith Hill

24 January 2015 27	Plymouth Argyle	1–1	Morecambe	Plymouth
15:00	R Reid 45'; McHugh (yellow card) 88'	Report	Redshaw 52'; Parrish (yellow card) 14'; Goodall (yellow card) 80'	Stadium: Home Park; Attendance: 6,314; Referee: Oliver Langford

31 January 2015 28	Hartlepool United	3–2	Plymouth Argyle	Hartlepool
15:00	Franks 08' 54'; Fenwick 76'; Woods (yellow card) 57'	Report	Brunt 30'; Lee 90'; Nelson (yellow card) 63'; Flanagan (yellow card) 63'	Stadium: Victoria Park (Hartlepool); Attendance: 3,291; Referee: Chris Kavanagh

7 February 2015 29	Plymouth Argyle	1–0	Accrington Stanley	Plymouth
15:00	Alessandra 42'; Lee (yellow card) 69'	Report	Atkinson (yellow card) 52'; McGuire (yellow card) 90'	Stadium: Home Park; Attendance: 6'005; Referee: Brendan Malone

10 February 2015 30	Wycombe Wanderers	0–2	Plymouth Argyle	High Wycombe
19:45	Mawson (yellow card) 43'; Wood (yellow card) 44'	Report	Alessandra 19'; Hartley 29'; McHugh (yellow card) 51'; B Reid (yellow card) 60'; Brunt (yellow card) 90'	Stadium: Adams Park; Attendance: 3,078 (773 Away); Referee: Mark Brown

14 February 2015 31	Plymouth Argyle	2–0	Cambridge United	Plymouth
15:00	Brunt 81'; Alessandra 84'	Report	Donaldson (yellow card) 90'	Stadium: Home Park; Attendance: 6,413 (199 away); Referee: Ian Williamson

21 February 2015 32	Exeter City	1–3	Plymouth Argyle	Exeter
13:00	Morrison (yellow card) 45'; Davies 45'; McAllister (yellow card) 63'	Report	Hartley (yellow card) 64'; O'Connor (yellow card) 64'; Lee (red card) 61'; R Reid 27' pen' (57) 71'	Stadium: St James Park; Attendance: 7,440 (2,000 away); Referee: Graham Scott

28 February 2015 33	Plymouth Argyle	0–2	Bury	Plymouth
15:00	Alessandra (yellow card) 90'	Report	El-Abd (yellow card) 54'; Nardiello 62'; Rose 90' (yellow card) 90'	Stadium: Home Park; Attendance: 7,374 (258 away); Referee: Darren Sheldrake

3 March 2015 34	Stevenage	1–0	Plymouth Argyle	Stevenage
19:45	Andrade 89'; Parrett (yellow card) 73'; Kennedy (yellow card) 78'	Report	B Reid (yellow card) 60'	Stadium: Broadhall Way; Attendance: 3,022 (830 Away); Referee: Andy Haines

7 March 2015 35	Plymouth Argyle	2–0	Northampton Town	Plymouth
15:00	O'Connor 28' (yellow card) 29'; Hartley (yellow card) 57'; Holmes-Dennis (yellow card) 58'; Alessandra 86'	Report	Taylor (yellow card) 82'	Stadium: Home Park; Attendance: 6,501 (320 Away); Referee: Stephen Martin

14 March 2015 36	Oxford United	0–0	Plymouth Argyle	Oxford
15:00	Roofe (yellow card) 90'	Report		Stadium: Kassam Stadium; Attendance: 8,057 (1,001 away); Referee: Michael Bull

17 March 2015 37	Dagenham & Redbridge	2–0	Plymouth Argyle	Dagenham
19:45 GMT	Ogogo 30'; Cureton 88'	Report		Stadium: Victoria Road; Attendance: 1,713 (706 away); Referee: Oliver Langford

21 March 2015 38	Plymouth Argyle	0–0	Newport County	Plymouth
15:00	Holmes-Dennis (yellow card) 28'	Report	Sandell (yellow card) 23'; Yakubu (yellow card) 61'	Stadium: Home Park; Attendance: 6,847 (339 away); Referee: Charles Breakspear

28 March 2015 39	Cheltenham Town	0–3	Plymouth Argyle	Cheltenham
15:00	Taylor (yellow card) 48'; Hanks (yellow card) 66'; Vaughan (yellow card) 70'	Report	R Reid 34' 60'; Ansah 86'; B Reid (yellow card) 36'; Alessandra (yellow card) 70'; Brunt (yellow card) 83'	Stadium: Whaddon Road; Attendance: 3,831 (1,772 away); Referee: Keith Hill

2 April 2015 40	Plymouth Argyle	1–1	Burton Albion	Plymouth
15:00	McHugh 86'	Report	Stewart 33'; Mousinho (yellow card) 35'; Akins (yellow card) 54'; Beavon (yellow card) 84'	Stadium: Home Park; Attendance: 8,649 (192 away); Referee: Darren Sheldrake

6 April 2015 41	Portsmouth	2–1	Plymouth Argyle	Portsmouth
15:00	Wallace 46'; Taylor 76'	Report	Lee 78'; Nelson (yellow card) 80' (red card) 90'	Stadium: Fratton Park; Attendance: 16,581 (2,013 away); Referee: Andy D'urso

11 April 2015 42	Plymouth Argyle	2–1	Mansfield Town	Plymouth
15:00	O'Connor 2'; McHugh 63'	Report	Oliver 64'; Beevers (yellow card) 33'	Stadium: Home Park; Attendance: 6,626 (307 away); Referee: Rob Lewis

14 April 2015 43	Plymouth Argyle	1–1	AFC Wimbledon	Plymouth
19:45	O'Connor 54'	Report	Bulman (yellow card) 43'; Azeez 62'	Stadium: Home Park; Attendance: 6,900 (119 away); Referee: Kevin Johnson

18 April 2015 44	Carlisle United	2–0	Plymouth Argyle	Carlisle, Cumbria
15:00	Dicker 29'; Paynter 50'	[ Report]	R Reid (yellow card) 56'	Stadium: Brunton Park; Attendance: 4,651 (696 away); Referee: Geoff Eltringham

25 April 2015 45	Plymouth Argyle	3–2	Tranmere Rovers	Plymouth
15:00	R Reid pen' (7); Holmes-Dennis 37'; O'Connor (yellow card) 75'; Alessandra 81'	Report	Dugdale (yellow card) 18'; Power 34' (yellow card) 86'; Ihiekwe (yellow card) 83'; Odejayi 89'	Stadium: Home Park; Attendance: 9,769 (550 away); Referee: Gavin Ward

2 May 2015 46	Shrewsbury Town	0–2	Plymouth Argyle	Shrewsbury
15:00	Woods (yellow card) 60'; Goldson (yellow card) 73'; Lawrence (yellow card) 84'	Report	B Reid 3'; Mellor 45'; O'Connor (yellow card) 62'	Stadium: New Meadow; Attendance: 8,963 (1,094 away); Referee: Darren Bond

Last updated:2 May 2015
Source:Greens on Screen

== Play-off semi-finals ==
=== Matches ===
9 May 2015 1st Leg	Plymouth Argyle	2–3	Wycombe Wanderers	Plymouth
19:45	Hartley (yellow card) 23'; McHugh (yellow card) 28'; O'Connor (yellow card) 58'; Ansah 86'; Banton 89'	Report	Hayes 10'; Amadi-Holloway 22'; Saunders (yellow card) 46'; Craig 52'	Stadium: Home Park; Attendance: 14,175; Referee: Peter Bankes

14 May 2015 2nd Leg	Wycombe Wanderers	2–1 (5–3 agg.)	Plymouth Argyle	High Wycombe
19:45	Hayes 8'; Mawson 35'	Report	O'Connor (yellow card) 31'; Brunt 71'; Mellor (yellow card) 79'; Hartley (yellow card) 90'	Stadium: Adams Park; Attendance: 7,750 (2,028 away); Referee: Nigel Miller

== FA Cup ==
The draw for the first round was made on 28 October 2014 at 7pm. Plymouth Argyle were drawn at home to AFC Fylde of the Conference North.

The second round draw took place on Monday 10 November with Plymouth Argyle being drawn an away fixture against either Crewe or Sheffield United. Their replay is due to be played on the Tuesday 18 November.

=== Matches ===
8 November 2014 First round	Plymouth Argyle	2–0	AFC Fylde	Plymouth
15:00	Hartley 28'; Morgan 69'	Report		Stadium: Home Park; Attendance: 5,153; Referee: James Linington

6 December 2014 Second round	Sheffield United	3–0	Plymouth Argyle	Sheffield
15:00	Baxter 55' (pen.), 62' (pen.); McNulty 90'	Report	Purrington (yellow card) 54'; Nelson (yellow card) 62'	Stadium: Bramall Lane; Attendance: 7,348; Referee: Gary Sutton

Last updated: 15 November 2014
Source: pafc.co.uk] Source: pafc.co.uk]

== League Cup ==
The draw for the first round was made on 17 June 2014 at 10am. Plymouth Argyle were drawn at home to Leyton Orient.

=== Matches ===
12 August 2014 First round	Plymouth Argyle	3–3 (a.e.t.) (5–6 p)	Leyton Orient	Plymouth
19:45	Reid 45+2', 64'; McHugh 108'	Report	Cox 13'; Baudry 38'; Vincelot 103'	Stadium: Home Park; Attendance: 3,343 (141 away); Referee: Tony Harrington
	Penalties
	Allen (penalty scored); Alessandra (penalty scored); Harvey (penalty scored); Morgan (penalty scored); Banton (penalty missed); Hartley (penalty scored); McHugh (penalty missed)		Mooney (penalty scored); Lisbie (penalty scored); Sawyer (penalty missed); McAnuff (penalty scored); Clarke (penalty scored); Vincelot (penalty scored); Baudry (penalty scored)

Last updated: 1 November 2014
Source:Greens on Screen

== Football League Trophy ==
=== Matches ===
7 October 2014 Second round	Plymouth Argyle	3–2	Swindon Town	Plymouth
19:45	Alessandra 4', 44'; Smalley 23'; Harvey (yellow card) 90'	Report	Smith 72' (pen.); Thompson (yellow card) 85'; Gladwin 87'	Stadium: Home Park; Attendance: 2,668 (323 away); Referee: Carl Berry

12 November 2014 Area quarter-final	Coventry City	2–0	Plymouth Argyle	Coventry
19:45	Maddison (yellow card) 26'; Madine 61'; Barton (yellow card) 84'; Nouble 85'; Webster (yellow card) 90'	BBC Report		Stadium: Ricoh Arena; Attendance: 7,121 (1,006 away); Referee: James Adcock

Last updated: 12 October 2014
Source:Greens on Screen

== Appearance / Goals / Disciplinary ==
No	Nat	Pos	Name	Appearances	Sub App	Goals	Booked	Sent off (straight red)
1	(England)	GK	James Bittner	0	1	0	0	0
2	(England)	RB	Kelvin Mellor	42	1	1	3	0
3	(England)	LB	Ben Purrington	5	4	0	2	0
4	(England)	CM	Lee Cox	25	12	0	3	0
5	(England)	CB	Curtis Nelson	49	0	1	4	1
6	(England)	CM	Oliver Norburn	10	9	0	2	0
7	(England)	ST	Lewis Alessandra	49	2	13	4	0
8	(England)	LM	Jason Banton	13	16	1	1	0
9	(England)	ST	Reuben Reid	48	1	20	3	0
10	(England)	ST	Marvin Morgan	6	13	2	2	0
11	(England)	CM	Dominic Blizzard	27	7	1	2	0
13	(England)	LB	Tareiq Holmes-Dennis	18	0	1	2	0
13	(England)	LB	Andy Kellett	15	0	1	1	0
14	(England)	ST	Tyler Harvey	5	12	1	1	0
15	(England)	CB/CM	Paul Wotton	0	0	0	0	0
16	(Republic of Ireland)	CB/LB	Carl McHugh	49	1	3	7	0
17	(Wales)	RM	Alex Bray	0	1	0	1	0
17	(England)	CM	Bobby Reid	35	0	2	6	0
18	(England)	ST	Matt Lecointe	0	0	0	0	0
19	(England)	LM	Nathan Thomas	2	10	1	3	0
19/28	(Republic of Ireland)	CB/CM	Anthony O'Connor	45	2	3	11	0
20	(Northern Ireland)	CB	Tom Flanagan	4	0	0	1	0
20	(Wales)	RB/CM	Gethin Jones	5	2	0	0	0
21	(England)	CM	Olly Lee	9	6	2	2	1
22	(England)	ST	Deane Smalley	5	13	2	1	0
23	(England)	GK	Luke McCormick	53	0	0	0	0
24	(England)	CM	River Allen	0	4	0	0	0
25	(England)	CB	Aaron Bentley	3	1	0	0	1
26	(England)	CB	Jamie Richards	0	0	0	0	0
27	(England)	RB/CM	Drew Talbot	9	0	0	0	0
27	(England)	ST	Zak Ansah	2	7	2	0	0
28	(England)	ST	Ryan Brunt	4	13	3	2	0
29	(England)	CB	Peter Hartley	45	1	5	11	0

Last updated: 26 June 2015
Source:Green Army 12

== Transfers ==
=== In ===
Date	Pos.	Nat.	Name	From	Fee	Ref.
1 July 2014	MF	ENG	Lee Cox	Swindon Town	Free transfer	
1 July 2014	DF	IRL	Carl McHugh	Bradford City	Free transfer	
1 July 2014	FW	ENG	Deane Smalley	Oxford United	Free transfer	
1 July 2014	DF	ENG	Peter Hartley	Stevenage	Free transfer	
1 July 2014	DF	ENG	Kelvin Mellor	Crewe Alexandra	Free transfer	
8 July 2014	GK	ENG	James Bittner	Salisbury City	Free transfer	
22 July 2014	MF	ENG	Oliver Norburn	Bristol Rovers	Free transfer	
2 February 2015	DF	IRL	Anthony O'Connor	Blackburn Rovers	Undisclosed	

=== Out ===
Date	Pos.	Nat.	Name	To	Fee	Ref.
23 June 2014	MF	IRL	Conor Hourihane	Barnsley	Undisclosed	
30 June 2014	GK	ENG	Jake Cole	Woking	Released	
30 June 2014	DF	ENG	Maxime Blanchard	Shamrock Rovers	Released	
30 June 2014	MF	BEN	Romuald Boco	Chesterfield	Released	
30 June 2014	DF	ENG	Luke Young	Torquay United	Released	
30 June 2014	DF	ENG	Neal Trotman	Bristol Rovers	Released	
30 June 2014	FW	ENG	Isaac Vassell	Truro City	Released	
30 June 2014	DF	ENG	Matthew Parsons	Eastbourne Borough	Released	
2 February 2015	MF	ENG	Nathan Thomas	Motherwell	Free transfer	

=== Loans in ===
Date	Name	From	Until	Ref
4 August 2014	Anthony O'Connor	Blackburn Rovers	January 2015	
1 September 2014	Alex Bray	Swansea City	9 September 2014	
25 September 2014	Bobby Reid	Bristol City	13 November 2014	
17 October 2014	Andy Kellett	Bolton Wanderers	13 December 2014	
26 November 2014	Bobby Reid	Bristol City	3 January 2015	
9 January 2015	Tom Flanagan	Milton Keynes Dons	10 February 2015	
16 January 2015	Olly Lee	Birmingham	21 February 2015	
21 January 2015	Bobby Reid	Bristol City	30 June 2015	
30 January 2015	Drew Talbot	Chesterfield	3 May 2015	
10 February 2015	Tareiq Holmes-Dennis	Charlton Athletic	3 May 2015	
25 March 2015	Gethin Jones	Everton	30 June 2015	
26 March 2015	Zak Ansah	Charlton Athletic	30 June 2015	

=== Loans out ===
Date	Name	To	Until	Ref
12 June 2014	Jamie Richards	Linfield	20 January 2015	
29 January 2015	Jamie Richards	Dartford	30 June 2015	
2 February 2015	Marvin Morgan	Hartlepool United	30 June 2015	
13 February 2015	River Allen	Gosport Borough	14 March 2015	
17 March 2015	River Allen	Truro City	30 June 2015	
