= 2014–15 Football League Cup =

Capital One Cup, League Cup

Tournament details
- Country: England; Wales
- Dates: 11 August 2014 – 1 March 2015
- Teams: 92

Final positions
- Champions: Chelsea (5th title)
- Runners-up: Tottenham Hotspur

Tournament statistics
- Matches played: 93
- Goals scored: 276 (2.97 per match)
- Top goal scorer(s): Benik Afobe (6 goals)

The 2014–15 Football League Cup (known as the Capital One Cup for sponsorship reasons) was the 55th season of the Football League Cup. It is a knock-out competition for the top 92 football clubs that played in English football league system.

The holders were Manchester City who beat Sunderland 3–1 in the previous season's final at Wembley on 2 March 2014. City were eventually knocked out in the fourth round by Newcastle United.

The first round kicked off on 11 August 2014 and consisted of a North/South split with only regional teams drawn against each other.

The first round included newly promoted Luton Town and Cambridge United from League Two. Premier League teams relegated to the Championship usually receive a bye to the second round, however, this season, Cardiff City entered the first round. The remaining Championship, League One and League Two clubs contested the first round, with non-European Premier League sides entering in the second and those involved in European competition entering in the third round.

Chelsea won the trophy after a 2–0 win over London rivals Tottenham Hotspur in the final.

== First round ==
The draw for the first round took place on 17 June 2014 at 10:00 BST. Ties were played during the week commencing 11 August 2014.

The 24 teams of League Two, the 24 teams of League One, and 22 teams from the Championship (70 teams altogether) entered this round. The two Championship teams exempted from this round were Norwich City and Fulham, the two highest-finishing relegated teams from the 2013–14 Premier League; Cardiff City were also relegated. However, they were not given a bye, since they finished last. The draw was as follows:

Number of teams per tier still in the competition
| Premier League (Note: Premier League teams joined the competition in the second and third rounds.) | Championship (Note: The top two Championship teams joined the competition in the second round.) | League One | League Two | Total |
|---|---|---|---|---|
| 20 / 20 | 24 / 24 | 24 / 24 | 24 / 24 | 92 / 92 |

=== Northern section ===
| 11 August 2014 | Carlisle United (4) | 0–2 | Derby County (2) | Carlisle |
| 19:45 BST | | Report | Hendrick 62'; Martin 90' | Stadium: Brunton Park; Attendance: 3,481; Referee: Darren Bond |

| 12 August 2014 | Barnsley (3) | 0–2 | Crewe Alexandra (3) | Barnsley |
| 19:45 BST | | Report | Waters 32'; Tootle 84' | Stadium: Oakwell Stadium; Attendance: 4,391; Referee: Chris Sarginson |

| 12 August 2014 | Blackburn Rovers (2) | 0–1 | Scunthorpe United (3) | Blackburn |
| 19:45 BST | | Report | Bishop 34' | Stadium: Ewood Park; Attendance: 5,352; Referee: Seb Stockbridge |

| 12 August 2014 | Bolton Wanderers (2) | 3–2 (a.e.t.) | Bury (4) | Horwich |
| 20:00 BST | C. Davies 90' (pen.); Danns 93', 96' | Report | Lowe 20'; McNulty 97' | Stadium: Macron Stadium; Attendance: 9,249; Referee: Jeremy Simpson |

| 12 August 2014 | Burton Albion (4) | 2–1 | Wigan Athletic (2) | Burton upon Trent |
| 19:45 BST | Knowles 45'; Beavon 52' | Report | Fortuné 27' | Stadium: Pirelli Stadium; Attendance: 2,602; Referee: Pat Miller |

| 12 August 2014 | Chesterfield (3) | 3–5 (a.e.t.) | Huddersfield Town (2) | Chesterfield |
| 19:45 BST | Humphreys 32'; Banks 45'; Doyle 71' | Report | Wells 58', 84' (pen.), 94'; Stead 90'; Lolley 98' | Stadium: Proact Stadium; Attendance: 4,569; Referee: Gary Sutton |

| 12 August 2014 | Leeds United (2) | 2–1 | Accrington Stanley (4) | Leeds |
| 19:45 BST | Doukara 19', 38' | Report | Gray 84' | Stadium: Elland Road; Attendance: 13,407; Referee: Richard Clark |

| 12 August 2014 | Morecambe (4) | 0–1 | Bradford City (3) | Morecambe |
| 19:45 BST | | Report | Mclean 83' | Stadium: Globe Arena; Attendance: 2,395; Referee: Scott Duncan |

| 12 August 2014 | Oldham Athletic (3) | 0–3 | Middlesbrough (2) | Oldham |
| 19:45 BST | | Report | L. Williams 30'; Leadbitter 48'; Kike 60' | Stadium: Boundary Park; Attendance: 4,311; Referee: James Adcock |

| 12 August 2014 | Port Vale (3) | 6–2 | Hartlepool United (4) | Stoke-on-Trent |
| 19:45 BST | Williamson 8', 14', 18'; Brown 62'; Pope 74', 84' | Report | Franks 10'; Austin 59' (pen.) | Stadium: Vale Park; Attendance: 2,824; Referee: Graham Scott |

| 12 August 2014 | Rochdale (3) | 0–2 | Preston North End (3) | Rochdale |
| 19:45 BST | | Report | Little 43'; Kilkenny 48' | Stadium: Spotland Stadium; Attendance: 2,348; Referee: Mark Brown |

| 12 August 2014 | Rotherham United (2) | 1–0 (a.e.t.) | Fleetwood Town (3) | Rotherham |
| 19:45 BST | Derbyshire 109' (pen.) | Report | | Stadium: New York Stadium; Attendance: 4,487; Referee: Nigel Miller |

| 12 August 2014 | Sheffield Wednesday (2) | 3–0 | Notts County (3) | Sheffield |
| 19:45 BST | Maghoma 2'; Madine 10'; Nuhiu 65' | Report | | Stadium: Hillsborough Stadium; Attendance: 12,851; Referee: Eddie Ilderton |

| 12 August 2014 | Shrewsbury Town (4) | 1–0 | Blackpool (2) | Shrewsbury |
| 19:45 BST | Vernon 34' | Report | | Stadium: New Meadow; Attendance: 4,524; Referee: Mark Heywood |

| 12 August 2014 | Tranmere Rovers (4) | 0–1 | Nottingham Forest (2) | Birkenhead |
| 19:45 BST | | Report | Antonio 12' | Stadium: Prenton Park; Attendance: 4,374; Referee: David Webb |

| 12 August 2014 | York City (4) | 0–1 | Doncaster Rovers (3) | York |
| 19:45 BST | | Report | Forrester 90' | Stadium: Bootham Crescent; Attendance: 3,357; Referee: Mark Haywood |

| 13 August 2014 | Sheffield United (3) | 2–1 | Mansfield Town (4) | Sheffield |
| 19:45 BST | Butler 53'; McNulty 86' | | Fisher 57' | Stadium: Bramall Lane; Attendance: 7,929; Referee: Geoff Eltringham |

=== Southern section ===
| 12 August 2014 | Birmingham City (2) | 3–1 (a.e.t.) | Cambridge United (4) | Birmingham |
| 19:45 BST | Donaldson 16'; Caddis 96'; Duffy 106' | Report | Donaldson 38' | Stadium: St Andrew's; Attendance: 9,816; Referee: Tim Robinson |

| 12 August 2014 | Brighton & Hove Albion (2) | 2–0 | Cheltenham Town (4) | Brighton and Hove |
| 19:45 BST | Dunk 79'; Mackail-Smith 90' | Report | | Stadium: Falmer Stadium; Attendance: 6,595; Referee: Michael Bull |

| 12 August 2014 | Bristol City (3) | 1–2 | Oxford United (4) | Bristol |
| 19:45 BST | Bryan 2' | Report | Morris 55'; Hylton 87' | Stadium: Ashton Gate Stadium; Attendance: 6,145; Referee: Lee Collins |

| 12 August 2014 | Charlton Athletic (2) | 4–0 | Colchester United (3) | Charlton |
| 19:45 BST | Buyens 24' (pen.); Wilson 54', 59'; Church 89' | Report | | Stadium: The Valley; Attendance: 5,752; Referee: Charles Breakspear |

| 12 August 2014 | Crawley Town (3) | 1–0 (a.e.t.) | Ipswich Town (2) | Crawley |
| 19:45 BST | Mcleod 111' | Report | | Stadium: Broadfield Stadium; Attendance: 3,043; Referee: Andy Haines |

| 12 August 2014 | Dagenham & Redbridge (4) | 6–6 (a.e.t.) (2–4 p) | Brentford (2) | Dagenham |
| 19:45 BST | Porter 17'; Chambers 45'; Boucaud 55'; Hemmings 90', 113'; Cureton 100' | Report | Dallas 5', 9'; Proschwitz 32'; Gray 83'; Moore 97'; Dean 117' | Stadium: Victoria Road; Attendance: 1,576; Referee: Keith Hill |
| | Penalties |
| | Connors (penalty missed); Howell (penalty scored); Partridge (penalty scored); Chambers (penalty missed) | | (penalty scored) Dallas; (penalty scored) Judge; (penalty scored) Craig; (penalty scored) O'Connor |

| 12 August 2014 | Exeter City (4) | 0–2 | AFC Bournemouth (2) | Exeter |
| 19:45 BST | | Report | Bennett 55' (og.); Gosling 74' | Stadium: St James Park; Attendance: 2,648; Referee: Andy Davies |

| 12 August 2014 | Luton Town (4) | 1–2 | Swindon Town (3) | Luton |
| 19:45 BST | Rooney 53' (pen.) | Report | M. Smith 76' (pen.), 81' | Stadium: Kenilworth Road; Attendance: 4,410; Referee: Paul Tierney |

| 12 August 2014 | Millwall (2) | 1–0 | Wycombe Wanderers (4) | Bermondsey |
| 19:45 BST | Briggs 27' | Report | | Stadium: The Den; Attendance: 3,403; Referee: Andy D'Urso |

| 12 August 2014 | Milton Keynes Dons (3) | 3–1 | AFC Wimbledon (4) | Milton Keynes |
| 19:45 BST | McFadzean 19'; Powell 49'; Afobe 76' | Report | Tubbs 90' (pen.) | Stadium: Stadium mk Attendance: 7,174; Referee: Dean Whitestone |

| 12 August 2014 | Plymouth Argyle (4) | 3–3 (a.e.t.) (5–6 p) | Leyton Orient (3) | Plymouth |
| 19:45 BST | Reid 45', 64'; McHugh 108' | Report | Cox 13'; Baudry 38'; Vincelot 103' | Stadium: Home Park; Attendance: 3,343; Referee: Tony Harrington |
| | Penalties |
| | Allen (penalty scored); Alessandra (penalty scored); Harvey (penalty scored); Morgan (penalty scored); Banton (penalty missed); Hartley (penalty scored); McHugh (penalty missed) | | (penalty scored) Mooney; (penalty scored) Lisbie; (penalty missed) Sawyer; (penalty scored) McAnuff; (penalty scored) Clarke; (penalty scored) Vincelot; (penalty scored) Baudry |

| 12 August 2014 | Portsmouth (4) | 1–0 | Peterborough United (3) | Portsmouth |
| 19:45 BST | Storey 12' | Report | | Stadium: Fratton Park; Attendance: 7,726; Referee: Brendan Malone |

| 12 August 2014 | Reading (2) | 3–1 | Newport County (4) | Reading |
| 20:00 BST | Pogrebnyak 20'; Blackman 87'; Tanner 90' | Report | Jeffers 90' | Stadium: Madejski Stadium; Attendance: 6,459; Referee: James Linington |

| 12 August 2014 | Southend United (4) | 1–2 | Walsall (3) | Southend-on-Sea |
| 19:45 BST | Leonard 68' | Report | Benning 25'; Morris 87' | Stadium: Roots Hall; Attendance: 3,146; Referee: Gavin Ward |

| 12 August 2014 | Stevenage (4) | 0–1 | Watford (2) | Stevenage |
| 19:45 BST | | Report | Dyer 52' | Stadium: Broadhall Way; Attendance: 3,989; Referee: Carl Berry |

| 12 August 2014 | Wolverhampton Wanderers (2) | 2–3 | Northampton Town (4) | Wolverhampton |
| 19:45 BST | Dicko 66'; Ricketts 67' | Report | D'Ath 58', 74'; Toney 63' | Stadium: Molineux Stadium; Attendance: 6,171; Referee: Stuart Attwell |

| 12 August 2014 | Yeovil Town (3) | 1–2 | Gillingham (3) | Yeovil |
| 19:45 BST | Gillett 56' | Report | Dickenson 23'; A. Morris 59' | Stadium: Huish Park; Attendance: 2,283; Referee: Darren Sheldrake |

| 13 August 2014 | Coventry City (3) | 1–2 | Cardiff City (2) | Northampton |
| 19:45 BST | Miller 83' | Report | Burgstaller 4'; Haynes 81' (og.) | Stadium: Sixfields Stadium; Attendance: 1,382; Referee: Simon Hooper |

== Second round ==
The 35 winners from Round One were joined by 13 teams from the Premier League (not taking part in European competitions), and the remaining two teams from the Championship (i.e. Norwich and Fulham, the two highest finishing relegated Premier League teams from last season). The remaining 7 Premier League teams participating in the UEFA Champions League or Europa League, received a bye into the third round.

The draw for the second round took place on 13 August 2014. Ties were played during the week commencing 25 August 2014.

Number of teams per tier still in the competition
| Premier League (Note: The seven Premier League teams involved in European competitions joined the competition in the third round.) | Championship | League One | League Two | Total |
|---|---|---|---|---|
| 20 / 20 | 19 / 24 | 13 / 24 | 5 / 24 | 57 / 92 |

| 26 August 2014 | Port Vale (3) | 2–3 | Cardiff City (2) | Stoke-on-Trent |
| 19:45 BST | O'Connor 34'; Brown 90' | Report | Ralls 26'; Macheda 60', 79' | Stadium: Vale Park; Attendance: 4,390; Referee: David Webb |

| 26 August 2014 | Middlesbrough (2) | 3–1 | Preston North End (3) | Middlesbrough |
| 19:45 BST | Tomlin 51', 66'; Fewster 57' | Report | Hugill 54' | Stadium: Riverside Stadium; Attendance: 10,727; Referee: Mark Haywood |

| 26 August 2014 | Huddersfield Town (2) | 0–2 | Nottingham Forest (2) | Huddersfield |
| 19:45 BST | | Report | Vaughan 72' (o.g.); Lansbury 82' | Stadium: John Smith's Stadium; Attendance: 6,509; Referee: Mark Brown |

| 26 August 2014 | Swansea City (1) | 1–0 | Rotherham United (2) | Swansea |
| 19:45 BST | Gomis 22' | Report | | Stadium: Liberty Stadium; Referee: Steve Martin |

| 26 August 2014 | Watford (2) | 1–2 | Doncaster Rovers (3) | Watford |
| 19:45 BST | L. Dyer 31' | Report | N. Tyson 12' (pen.); Wakefield 52' | Stadium: Vicarage Road; Attendance: 7,318; Referee: Andy Woolmer |

| 26 August 2014 | Millwall (2) | 0–2 | Southampton (1) | Bermondsey |
| 19:45 BST | | Report | Cork 53'; Pellè 90' | Stadium: The Den; Attendance: 6,014; Referee: Dean Whitestone |

| 26 August 2014 | AFC Bournemouth (2) | 3–0 | Northampton Town (4) | Bournemouth |
| 19:45 BST | Gosling 21'; Pitman 30'; Wilson 79' | Report | | Stadium: Dean Court; Attendance: 5,250; Referee: Carl Berry |

| 26 August 2014 | Brentford (2) | 0–1 | Fulham (2) | Brentford |
| 19:45 BST | | Report | McCormack 68' | Stadium: Griffin Park; Attendance: 7,563; Referee: Scott Duncan |

| 26 August 2014 | Scunthorpe United (3) | 0–1 | Reading (2) | Scunthorpe |
| 19:45 BST | | Report | Taylor 85' | Stadium: Glanford Park; Attendance: 2,657; Referee: Kevin Wright |

| 26 August 2014 | Derby County (2) | 1–0 | Charlton Athletic (2) | Derby |
| 19:45 BST | Calero 87' | Report | | Stadium: iPro Stadium; Attendance: 16,367; Referee: Graham Salisbury |

| 26 August 2014 | West Ham United (1) | 1–1 (a.e.t.) (4–5 p) | Sheffield United (3) | Upton Park |
| 19:45 BST | Sakho 40' | Report | Reid 57' (o.g.) | Stadium: Boleyn Ground; Attendance: 28,930; Referee: James Linington |
| | Penalties |
| | Noble (penalty scored); Downing (penalty scored); Zárate (penalty scored); Poyet (penalty scored); Valencia (penalty missed) | | (penalty scored) Davies; (penalty scored) Collins; (penalty scored) McNulty; (penalty scored) McEveley; (penalty scored) Doyle |

| 26 August 2014 | Swindon Town (3) | 2–4 (a.e.t.) | Brighton & Hove Albion (2) | Swindon |
| 19:45 BST | L. Thompson 46'; Kasim 112' | Report | Ince 10'; Colunga 95'; Forster-Caskey 100' (pen.), 120+3' (pen.) | Stadium: County Ground; Attendance: 5,414; Referee: Andy Madley |

| 26 August 2014 | Leicester City (1) | 0–1 | Shrewsbury Town (4) | Leicester |
| 19:45 BST | | Report | Mangan 38' | Stadium: King Power Stadium; Attendance: 8,017; Referee: Simon Hooper |

| 26 August 2014 | Crewe Alexandra (3) | 2–3 (a.e.t.) | Bolton Wanderers (2) | Crewe |
| 19:45 BST | Inman 2'; Haber 90+8' | Report | Pratley 40'; Beckford 90+2', 107' | Stadium: Gresty Road; Attendance: 2,642; Referee: Tony Harrington |

| 26 August 2014 | Gillingham (3) | 0–1 | Newcastle United (1) | Gillingham |
| 19:45 BST | | Report | Egan 25' (o.g.) | Stadium: Priestfield Stadium; Referee: Oliver Langford |

| 26 August 2014 | Norwich City (2) | 3–1 | Crawley Town (3) | Norwich |
| 19:45 BST | Jerome 14'; Josh Murphy 49', 90+2' | Report | Cuéllar 55' (o.g.) | Stadium: Carrow Road; Attendance: 14,414; Referee: Darren Deadman |

| 26 August 2014 | Burnley (1) | 0–1 | Sheffield Wednesday (2) | Burnley |
| 19:45 BST | | Report | Nuhiu 78' (pen.) | Stadium: Turf Moor; Attendance: 4,979; Referee: Geoff Eltringham |

| 26 August 2014 | Walsall (3) | 0–3 | Crystal Palace (1) | Walsall |
| 19:45 BST | | Report | Gayle 7', 25', 41' | Stadium: Bescot Stadium; Attendance: 3,987; Referee: Darren Drysdale |

| 26 August 2014 | Milton Keynes Dons (3) | 4–0 | Manchester United (1) | Milton Keynes |
| 20:00 BST | Grigg 25', 63'; Afobe 70', 84' | Report | | Stadium: Stadium mk Attendance: 26,969; Referee: Stuart Attwell |

| 26 August 2014 | West Bromwich Albion (1) | 1–1 (a.e.t.) (7–6 p) | Oxford United (4) | West Bromwich |
| 20:00 BST | Mullins 29' (o.g.) | Report | Hylton 86' | Stadium: The Hawthorns; Attendance: 10,939; Referee: James Adcock |
| | Penalties |
| | Morrison (penalty missed); Ideye (penalty missed); Mulumbu (penalty scored); Berahino (penalty scored); Yacob (penalty scored); Dawson (penalty scored); Wisdom (penalty scored); Gamboa (penalty scored); Davidson (penalty scored) | | (penalty scored) Hylton; (penalty missed) Collins; (penalty missed) Newey; (penalty scored) Hoskins; (penalty scored) Hunt; (penalty scored) Jakubiak; (penalty scored) Ruffels; (penalty scored) Mullins; (penalty missed) Wright |

| 27 August 2014 | Aston Villa (1) | 0–1 | Leyton Orient (3) | Birmingham |
| 19:45 BST | | Report | Vincelot 87' | Stadium: Villa Park; Attendance: 17,918; Referee: Carl Boyeson |

| 27 August 2014 | Bradford City (3) | 2–1 | Leeds United (2) | Bradford |
| 19:45 BST | Knott 84'; Hanson 86' | Report | Smith 82' | Stadium: Valley Parade; Attendance: 18,750; Referee: Graham Scott |

| 27 August 2014 | Burton Albion (4) | 1–0 | Queens Park Rangers (1) | Burton upon Trent |
| 19:45 BST | McGurk 77' | Report | | Stadium: Pirelli Stadium; Attendance: 3,999; Referee: Paul Tierney |

| 27 August 2014 | Stoke City (1) | 3–0 | Portsmouth (4) | Stoke-on-Trent |
| 19:45 BST | Walters 16', 47'; Crouch 90' | Report | | Stadium: Britannia Stadium; Attendance: 10,312; Referee: Andy D'Urso |

| 27 August 2014 | Birmingham City (2) | 0–3 | Sunderland (1) | Birmingham |
| 19:45 BST | | Report | Gómez 77'; Johnson 87'; Wickham 88' | Stadium: St Andrew's; Attendance: 11,245; Referee: Darren Bond |

== Third round ==
The seven Premier League teams participating in European club competition (UEFA Champions League or Europa League) – holders Manchester City, Arsenal, Chelsea, Everton, Hull City, Liverpool and Tottenham Hotspur – entered the tournament in this round. They were joined by the 25 winners from Round Two.

The draw for the third round took place on 27 August 2014 live on Sky Sports. Ties were played during the week commencing 22 September 2014.

Number of teams per tier still in the competition
| Premier League | Championship | League One | League Two | Total |
|---|---|---|---|---|
| 14 / 20 | 11 / 24 | 5 / 24 | 2 / 24 | 32 / 92 |

| 23 September 2014 | Arsenal (1) | 1–2 | Southampton (1) | Holloway |
| 19:45 BST | Sánchez 14' | Report | Tadić 20' (pen.); Clyne 40' | Stadium: Emirates Stadium; Attendance: 59,621; Referee: Keith Stroud |

| 23 September 2014 | Leyton Orient (3) | 0–1 | Sheffield United (3) | Leyton |
| 19:45 BST | | Report | Higdon 2' | Stadium: Brisbane Road; Attendance: 3,223; Referee: James Adcock |

| 23 September 2014 | Cardiff City (2) | 0–3 | AFC Bournemouth (2) | Cardiff |
| 19:45 BST | | Report | Gosling 9', 33'; Daniels 22' | Stadium: Cardiff City Stadium; Attendance: 6,491; Referee: Andy Madley |

| 23 September 2014 | Sunderland (1) | 1–2 | Stoke City (1) | Sunderland |
| 19:45 BST | Altidore 16' | Report | Muniesa 31', 71' | Stadium: Stadium of Light; Attendance: 17,353; Referee: Mike Dean |

| 23 September 2014 | Derby County (2) | 2–0 | Reading (2) | Derby |
| 19:45 BST | Russell 67'; Pearce 82' (o.g.) | Report | | Stadium: Pride Park; Attendance: 18,409; Referee: Simon Hooper |

| 23 September 2014 | Liverpool (1) | 2–2 (a.e.t.) (14–13 p) | Middlesbrough (2) | Liverpool |
| 19:45 BST | Rossiter 10'; Suso 109' | Report | Reach 62'; Bamford 120+3' (pen.) | Stadium: Anfield; Attendance: 41,857; Referee: Mike Jones |
| | Penalties |
| | Balotelli (penalty scored); Lucas (penalty scored); Lallana (penalty scored); Suso (penalty scored); Sterling (penalty missed); Williams (penalty scored); Touré (penalty scored); Sakho (penalty scored); Manquillo (penalty scored); José Enrique (penalty scored); Mignolet (penalty scored); Balotelli (penalty scored); Lucas (penalty scored); Lallana (penalty scored); Suso (penalty scored) | | (penalty missed) Bamford; (penalty scored) Clayton; (penalty scored) Reach; (penalty scored) Adomah; (penalty scored) Vossen; (penalty scored) Friend; (penalty scored) Ayala; (penalty scored) Fredericks; (penalty scored) Omeruo; (penalty scored) Wildschut; (penalty scored) Blackman; (penalty scored) Bamford; (penalty scored) Clayton; (penalty scored) Reach; (penalty missed) Adomah |

| 23 September 2014 | Milton Keynes Dons (3) | 2–0 | Bradford City (3) | Milton Keynes |
| 19:45 BST | Afobe 5', 86' | Report | | Stadium: Stadium mk Attendance: 5,707; Referee: Mick Russell |

| 23 September 2014 | Swansea City (1) | 3–0 | Everton (1) | Swansea |
| 19:45 BST | Dyer 28'; Sigurðsson 64'; Emnes 87' | Report | | Stadium: Liberty Stadium; Attendance: 20,397; Referee: Roger East |

| 23 September 2014 | Shrewsbury Town (4) | 1–0 | Norwich City (2) | Shrewsbury |
| 19:45 BST | Collins 54' | Report | | Stadium: New Meadow; Attendance: 6,187; Referee: Scott Mathieson |

| 23 September 2014 | Fulham (2) | 2–1 | Doncaster Rovers (3) | Fulham |
| 19:45 BST | Ruiz 16'; Burn 32' | Report | Coppinger 60' | Stadium: Craven Cottage; Attendance: 8,070; Referee: Kevin Friend |

| 24 September 2014 | Chelsea (1) | 2–1 | Bolton Wanderers (2) | Fulham |
| 19:45 BST | Zouma 25'; Oscar 55' | Report | Mills 31' | Stadium: Stamford Bridge; Attendance: 40,988; Referee: Graham Scott |

| 24 September 2014 | Crystal Palace (1) | 2–3 (a.e.t.) | Newcastle United (1) | Selhurst |
| 20:00 BST | Gayle 25' (pen.); Kaikai 90' | Report | Rivière 36', 48' (pen.); Dummett 112' | Stadium: Selhurst Park; Attendance: 13,773; Referee: Robert Madley |

| 24 September 2014 | Manchester City (1) | 7–0 | Sheffield Wednesday (2) | Manchester |
| 19:45 BST | Lampard 47', 90'; Džeko 53', 77'; Navas 54'; Touré 60' (pen.); Pozo 88' | Report | | Stadium: City of Manchester Stadium; Attendance: 32,346; Referee: Paul Tierney |

| 24 September 2014 | Burton Albion (4) | 0–3 | Brighton & Hove Albion (2) | Burton-on-Trent |
| 19:45 BST | | Report | Ince 18'; LuaLua 37'; Mackail-Smith 66' | Stadium: Pirelli Stadium; Attendance: 3,253; Referee: Darren Bond |

| 24 September 2014 | Tottenham Hotspur (1) | 3–1 | Nottingham Forest (2) | Tottenham |
| 19:45 BST | Mason 72'; Soldado 83'; Kane 90' | Report | Grant 61' | Stadium: White Hart Lane; Attendance: 31,912; Referee: Andre Marriner |

| 24 September 2014 | West Bromwich Albion (1) | 3–2 | Hull City (1) | West Bromwich |
| 20:00 BST | Ideye 15'; McAuley 87'; Berahino 88' | Report | Ince 41'; Brady 50' | Stadium: The Hawthorns; Attendance: 10,496; Referee: Phil Dowd |

== Fourth round ==
The draw for the fourth round took place on 24 September 2014. Ties were played during the week commencing 27 October 2014.

Number of teams per tier still in the competition
| Premier League | Championship | League One | League Two | Total |
|---|---|---|---|---|
| 9 / 20 | 4 / 24 | 2 / 24 | 1 / 24 | 16 / 92 |

| 28 October 2014 | AFC Bournemouth (2) | 2–1 | West Bromwich Albion (1) | Bournemouth |
| 19:45 | O'Kane 49'; Wilson 86' | Report | Elphick 85' (o.g.) | Stadium: Dean Court; Attendance: 11,296; Referee: Paul Tierney |

| 28 October 2014 | Shrewsbury Town (4) | 1–2 | Chelsea (1) | Shrewsbury |
| 19:45 | Mangan 77' | Report | Drogba 48'; Grandison 81' (o.g.) | Stadium: New Meadow; Attendance: 10,210; Referee: Neil Swarbrick |

| 28 October 2014 | Milton Keynes Dons (3) | 1–2 | Sheffield United (3) | Milton Keynes |
| 19:45 | Afobe 67' (pen.) | Report | Higdon 86', 90+2' | Stadium: Stadium mk Attendance: 8,520; Referee: Roger East |

| 28 October 2014 | Liverpool (1) | 2–1 | Swansea City (1) | Liverpool |
| 20:00 | Balotelli 86'; Lovren 90+5' | Report | Emnes 65' | Stadium: Anfield; Attendance: 42,582; Referee: Keith Stroud |

| 28 October 2014 | Fulham (2) | 2–5 | Derby County (2) | Fulham |
| 20:00 | Dembélé 27', 45' | Report | Martin 45+2' (pen.); Russell 47'; Dawkins 54', 65'; Hendrick 62' | Stadium: Craven Cottage; Attendance: 15,156; Referee: Graham Scott |

| 29 October 2014 | Tottenham Hotspur (1) | 2–0 | Brighton & Hove Albion (2) | Tottenham |
| 19:45 | Lamela 54'; Kane 74' | Report | | Stadium: White Hart Lane; Attendance: 33,537; Referee: Mark Clattenburg |

| 29 October 2014 | Stoke City (1) | 2–3 | Southampton (1) | Stoke-on-Trent |
| 19:45 | Nzonzi 49'; Diouf 82' | Report | Pellè 6', 88'; Long 30' | Stadium: Britannia Stadium; Attendance: 16,340; Referee: Lee Mason |

| 29 October 2014 | Manchester City (1) | 0–2 | Newcastle United (1) | Manchester |
| 19:45 | | Report | Aarons 6'; Sissoko 75' | Stadium: City of Manchester Stadium; Attendance: 40,752; Referee: Stuart Attwell |

== Fifth round ==
The draw for the fifth round took place on 29 October 2014. Ties were played during the week commencing 15 December 2014.

Number of teams per tier still in the competition
| Premier League | Championship | League One | League Two | Total |
|---|---|---|---|---|
| 5 / 20 | 2 / 24 | 1 / 24 | 0 / 24 | 8 / 92 |

| 16 December 2014 | Derby County (2) | 1–3 | Chelsea (1) | Derby |
| 19:45 | Bryson 71' | Report | Hazard 23'; Filipe Luís 56'; Schürrle 82' | Stadium: Pride Park; Attendance: 30,639; Referee: Jonathan Moss |

| 16 December 2014 | Sheffield United (3) | 1–0 | Southampton (1) | Sheffield |
| 19:45 | McNulty 63' | Report | | Stadium: Bramall Lane; Attendance: 21,906; Referee: Chris Foy |

| 17 December 2014 | Tottenham Hotspur (1) | 4–0 | Newcastle United (1) | Tottenham |
| 19:45 | Bentaleb 18'; Chadli 46'; Kane 65'; Soldado 70' | Report | | Stadium: White Hart Lane; Attendance: 34,677; Referee: Andre Marriner |

| 17 December 2014 | AFC Bournemouth (2) | 1–3 | Liverpool (1) | Bournemouth |
| 19:45 | Gosling 57' | Report | Sterling 20', 51'; Marković 27' | Stadium: Dean Court; Attendance: 11,347; Referee: Mark Clattenburg |

== Semi-finals ==
The draw for the semi-finals took place on 17 December 2014 after the televised game between Bournemouth and Liverpool.

Number of teams per tier still in the competition
| Premier League | Championship | League One | League Two | Total |
|---|---|---|---|---|
| 3 / 20 | 0 / 24 | 1 / 24 | 0 / 24 | 4 / 92 |

=== First leg ===
First-leg matches were played during the week commencing 19 January 2015.

20 January 2015
19:45 GMT

| Liverpool (1) | 1–1 | Chelsea (1) |
|---|---|---|
| Sterling 59' | Report | Hazard 18' (pen.) |

Anfield, Liverpool
Attendance: 44,573
Referee: Martin Atkinson
21 January 2015
20:00 GMT

| Tottenham Hotspur (1) | 1–0 | Sheffield United (3) |
|---|---|---|
| Townsend 74' (pen.) | Report |

White Hart Lane, Tottenham
Attendance: 35,323
Referee: Neil Swarbrick

=== Second leg ===
Second-leg matches were played during the week commencing 26 January 2015.

27 January 2015
19:45 GMT

| Chelsea (1) | 1–0 (a.e.t.) | Liverpool (1) |
|---|---|---|
| Ivanović 94' | Report |

Stamford Bridge, London
Attendance: 40,659
Referee: Michael Oliver

Chelsea won 2–1 on aggregate.

28 January 2015
19:45 GMT

| Sheffield United (3) | 2–2 | Tottenham Hotspur (1) |
|---|---|---|
| Adams 77', 79' | Report | Eriksen 28', 88' |

Bramall Lane, Sheffield
Attendance: 30,236
Referee: Mike Dean

Tottenham Hotspur won 3–2 on aggregate.

== Final ==
The League Cup Final was held on 1 March 2015 at Wembley Stadium.

Number of teams per tier still in the competition
| Premier League | Championship | League One | League Two | Total |
|---|---|---|---|---|
| 2 / 20 | 0 / 24 | 0 / 24 | 0 / 24 | 2 / 92 |

1 March 2015
16:00 GMT

| Chelsea | 2–0 | Tottenham Hotspur |
|---|---|---|
| Terry 45'; Costa 56' | Report |

Wembley Stadium, London
Attendance: 89,294
Referee: Anthony Taylor (Cheshire)

== Broadcasting rights ==
The live television rights for the competition were held by the subscription channel Sky Sports, who have held rights to the competition since 1996–97. BBC TV had highlights rights, under the title The League Cup Show.

These matches were televised live by Sky Sports:

| Round | Live TV games |
|---|---|
| First round | Carlisle United vs Derby County, Coventry City vs Cardiff City |
| Second round | Milton Keynes Dons vs Manchester United, Bradford City vs Leeds United |
| Third round | Liverpool v Middlesbrough, Tottenham Hotspur vs Nottingham Forest |
| Fourth round | Shrewsbury Town vs Chelsea, Manchester City vs Newcastle United |
| Quarter-finals | Derby County vs Chelsea, AFC Bournemouth vs Liverpool |
| Semi-finals | All 4 matches |
| Final | Chelsea vs Tottenham Hotspur |

== Match ball ==
The official match ball for the 2014–15 competition was the Mitre Delta V12S.
