= Jordan Bentley =

English footballer

Personal information
- Date of birth: 30 April 1999 (age 27)
- Place of birth: Plymouth, England
- Position: Defender

Team information
- Current team: St Blazey

Senior career*
| Years | Team | Apps | (Gls) |
| 2016–2019 | Plymouth Argyle | 1 | (0) |
| 2017 | → Sutton United (loan) | 5 | (0) |
| 2018–2019 | → Truro City (loan) | 9 | (0) |
| 2019–2020 | Tiverton Town | | (o) |
| 2020–2022 | Plymouth Parkway | | |
| 2022–2025 | Helston Athletic | | |
| 2025– | St Blazey | | |
- * Club domestic league appearances and goals as of 17 July 2019

Jordan Bentley (born 30 April 1999) is an English footballer who plays for St Blazey as a defender. He had previously played professionally after coming through the youth system at Plymouth Argyle.

== Career ==
Bentley made his first team debut in the final league game of the 2015–16 season as a 66th-minute substitute for Curtis Nelson in a 5–0 win over Hartlepool United. He made his full first team debut in an EFL Trophy group stage match away to Swansea City's under-23s, who won 2–0, in which he was sent off just before half time for two bookable offences. Bentley was sent on loan to Sutton United in September 2017, but was recalled by Argyle after a lack of match time.

On 23 January 2018, Bentley broke his leg after tackling a teammate in training, and was ruled out injured for 6 months. In the 2018-19 season, Bentley and fellow Argyle youth player Dan Rooney joined Truro City on loan in the National League South.

On 7 May 2019 Plymouth Argyle announced that Bentley had been forced to retire from the professional game due to persistent injuries.

On 13 July 2019 it was announced that Bentley had signed for semi-pro Tiverton Town, of the Southern League Premier South.

== Personal life ==
Jordan is the younger brother of fellow St Blazey defender Aaron Bentley, who had previously played for Plymouth Argyle, Truro City, and Plymouth Parkway.
