= Ryan Brunt =

Ryan Brunt may refer to:

- Ryan Brunt (curler) (born 1985), American curler
- Ryan Brunt (footballer) (born 1993), English professional footballer
