= River Allen (footballer) =

English footballer

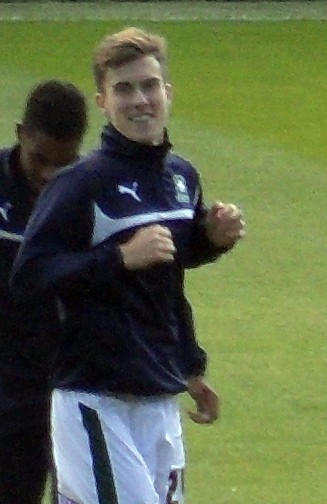
- Allen with Plymouth Argyle in October 2014

Personal information
- Full name: River Brian Zach Allen
- Date of birth: 7 October 1995 (age 31)
- Place of birth: Plymouth, England
- Height: 1.79 m (5 ft 10 in)
- Position: Midfielder

Team information
- Current team: Tiverton Town

Youth career
- 2004–2007: Tamarside
- 2007–2014: Plymouth Argyle

Senior career*
| Years | Team | Apps | (Gls) |
| 2014–2015 | Plymouth Argyle | 3 | (0) |
| 2015 | → Gosport Borough (loan) | 4 | (0) |
| 2015 | → Truro City (loan) | 5 | (0) |
| 2015–2016 | Gateshead | 4 | (0) |
| 2016 | Bodmin Town | 16 | (1) |
| 2016–2018 | Truro City | 47 | (2) |
| 2018 | → Tiverton Town (loan) | 3 | (0) |
| 2018 | Tiverton Town | 8 | (3) |
| 2018–2019 | Truro City | 23 | (1) |
| 2019–2020 | Tiverton Town | 26 | (12) |
| 2020–2022 | Plymouth Parkway | | |
| 2022– | Tiverton Town | | |
- * Club domestic league appearances and goals as of 09:23, 30 December 2021 (UTC)

River Brian Zach Allen (born 7 October 1995) is an English footballer who plays as a midfielder for Tiverton Town.

== Career ==
Allen first signed for the Plymouth Argyle Centre of Excellence at the age of 11, going on to represent Plymouth Argyle's under 18s as an apprentice. He signed his first professional contract for the club in 2014.

He made his first appearance for the club as a 107th-minute substitute for Lee Cox in a League Cup first-round game against Leyton Orient on 12 August 2014, in which he took and scored the first Argyle penalty in the penalty shootout after a 3–3 draw at Home Park. Four days later, he made his first league appearance in the Devon Derby against Exeter City, as a 76th-minute substitute for Tyler Harvey in Argyle's 3–0 League Two home win.

In March 2015, after completing a month-long loan at Gosport Borough in the Conference South, Allen signed for Southern League club Truro City until the end of the 2014–15 season. He made his Truro debut as a substitute in the 2–1 win at Chippenham Town on 21 March.

Allen was released by Plymouth Argyle manager John Sheridan on 17 May 2015 along with a number of other first team players. Sheridan promptly resigned from his position only days later.

On 1 June 2015, it was announced that Allen had gone on trial at National League side Gateshead, and on 11 June he played in a pre-season friendly against Premier League side Newcastle United. On 28 June, Allen signed a one-year contract with Gateshead. He made his Gateshead debut on 26 September as a substitute in a 1–0 victory at Forest Green Rovers. After starting the three of the following four matches, Allen did not feature for the first team again before his contract was cancelled by mutual consent on 14 January 2016.

In February 2016, Allen returned to Cornwall and signed for South West Peninsula League Premier Division side Bodmin Town. He made his debut on 20 February in a 2–0 Cornwall Senior Cup victory over Mousehole A.F.C. and scored his first senior goal in the semi-final of the same competition on 1 March in a 5–2 win over Helston Athletic.

In the summer of 2018, he signed permanently for Tiverton Town.

On 6 October 2018, he returned to Truro City.

In June 2019, he returned to Tiverton Town after being released by Truro City. In August 2020, he announced that he was leaving Tiverton due to work commitments, as he had started a new career as a trainee financial advisor and could not devote the necessary time to travelling. He subsequently dropped down a couple of divisions to play for South West Peninsula League side Plymouth Parkway for the 2020–21 season before it was curtailed. At the end of the season the club were awarded upward movement into the Southern League. In August 2022, Allen returned to Tiverton Town.

== Career statistics ==
As of match played on 25 November 2017

Appearances and goals by club, season and competition
| Season | Club | League | | | FA Cup | | League Cup | | Other | | Total | |
| Season | Club | Division | Apps | Goals | Apps | Goals | Apps | Goals | Apps | Goals | Apps | Goals |
|---|---|---|---|---|---|---|---|---|---|---|---|---|
| Plymouth Argyle | 2014–15 | League Two | 3 | 0 | 0 | 0 | 1 | 0 | 0 | 0 | 4 | 0 |
| Gosport Borough (loan) | 2014–15 | Conference South | 4 | 0 | 0 | 0 | — | | 0 | 0 | 4 | 0 |
| Truro City (loan) | 2014–15 | SFL - Premier Division | 5 | 0 | 0 | 0 | — | | 0 | 0 | 5 | 0 |
| Gateshead | 2015–16 | National League | 4 | 0 | 0 | 0 | — | | 0 | 0 | 4 | 0 |
| Bodmin Town | 2015–16 | SWPL - Premier Division | 16 | 1 | 0 | 0 | — | | 8 (Note: Four appearances and a goal in the Cornwall Senior Cup; four appearances in the Walter C. Parson Cup) | 1 | 24 | 2 |
| Truro City | 2016–17 | National League South | 32 | 1 | 0 | 0 | — | | 2 (Note: Appearances in the FA Trophy) | 0 | 34 | 1 |
| Truro City | 2017–18 | National League South | 13 | 1 | 2 | 0 | — | | 0 | 0 | 15 | 1 |
| Truro City | Truro City total | | 45 | 2 | 2 | 0 | 0 | 0 | 2 | 0 | 49 | 2 |
| Career total | | | 77 | 3 | 2 | 0 | 1 | 0 | 10 | 1 | 90 | 4 |
