= Lee Cox (footballer) =

English footballer

Personal information
- Full name: Lee David Cox
- Date of birth: 26 June 1990 (age 36)
- Place of birth: Leicester, England
- Position: Midfielder

Youth career
- 2003–2008: Leicester City

Senior career*
Years	Team	Apps	(Gls)
2008–2009	Leicester City	0	(0)
2009	→ Yeovil Town (loan)	0	(0)
2009–2012	Inverness Caledonian Thistle	67	(3)
2012–2014	Swindon Town	12	(1)
2012–2013	→ Oxford United (loan)	14	(0)
2013	→ Plymouth Argyle (loan)	10	(0)
2014–2016	Plymouth Argyle	36	(0)
2015–2016	→ Stevenage (loan)	5	(0)
2016	Stevenage	12	(0)
2016–2017	Brackley Town	2	(0)
2017–2018	Coalville Town	5	(0)
- * Club domestic league appearances and goals as of 22:30, 17 December 2019 (UTC)

Lee David Cox (born 26 June 1990) is an English professional footballer who most recently played for Midland League Division One side Coalville Town, where he played as a midfielder.

== Playing career ==
Cox was born in Leicester. He began his career when he joined Leicester City as a 13-year-old. He was a member of the youth team that won the Premier Academy League in the 2006–07 season and signed his first professional contract in May 2008. Cox was loaned to Yeovil Town for a month in January 2009, but returned to Leicester without making a first-team appearance. He was released by the club that summer and signed a one-year contract with Inverness Caledonian Thistle in June. In his first season with the club, Cox won the Scottish Football League First Division title and promotion to the Scottish Premier League.

He signed a two-year contract extension in April 2010. Having made 67 league appearances for Inverness, Cox was transferred to Swindon Town in January 2012 for an undisclosed fee on a two-and-a-half-year contract. He made seven appearances in his first two months with Swindon but lost his place in March and did not play again before the club won the Football League Two title. Cox was transfer-listed in June, and joined Oxford United on loan until January 2013 the following month. He made 19 appearances for Oxford in all competitions before returning to Swindon when the clubs were unable to agree terms on an extension.

In February 2013, Cox joined Plymouth Argyle on loan until the end of the season. He played regularly in his first two months with the club, making ten league appearances, before suffering a shoulder injury in a 1–0 win against Exeter City. Cox required surgery to repair torn ligaments, which would prevent him from playing for six months. "It's a crying shame as he has been a big lift for us," said Argyle manager John Sheridan.

On 12 May 2014, Cox signed for Plymouth Argyle on a free transfer following his release from Swindon Town.

On 26 November 2015, Cox signed for Stevenage on loan from Plymouth Argyle.

on 10 January 2016, Cox returned to Argyle as his loan deal expired.

In July 2017, Cox joined Coalville Town.

== Career statistics ==
As of match played on 19 March 2014.

Appearances and goals by club, season and competition
Club	Season	League			FA Cup		League Cup		Other		Total	
Club	Season	Division	Apps	Goals	Apps	Goals	Apps	Goals	Apps	Goals	Apps	Goals
Leicester City	2008–09	Championship	0	0	0	0	0	0	0	0	0	0
Yeovil Town (loan)	2008–09	League One	0	0	0	0	0	0	0	0	0	0
Inverness Caledonian Thistle	2009–10	Scottish First Division	33	2	2	0	3	0	5 (Note: Appearances in the Scottish Challenge Cup)	0	43	2
Inverness Caledonian Thistle	2010–11	Scottish Premier League	27	1	3	0	3	1	0	0	33	2
Inverness Caledonian Thistle	2011–12	Scottish Premier League	7	0	2	0	0	0	0	0	9	0
Inverness Caledonian Thistle	Total		67	3	7	0	6	1	5	0	85	4
Swindon Town	2011–12	League Two	7	0	0	0	0	0	0	0	7	0
Swindon Town	2012–13	League One	0	0	0	0	0	0	0	0	0	0
Swindon Town	2013–14	League One	4	1	0	0	0	0	1 (Note: Appearances in the Football League Trophy)	0	5	1
Swindon Town	Total		11	1	0	0	0	0	1	0	12	1
Oxford United (loan)	2012–13	League Two	14	0	3	0	1	0	1	0	19	0
Plymouth Argyle (loan)	2012–13	League Two	10	0	0	0	0	0	0	0	10	0
Plymouth Argyle	2014–15	League Two	32	0	2	0	1	0	2	0	37	0
Plymouth Argyle	2015–16	League Two	1	0	0	0	0	0	0	0	1	0
Plymouth Argyle	Total		33	0	2	0	1	0	2	0	38	0
Career total			135	4	12	0	8	1	9	0	164	4

== Honours ==
- Premier Academy League: 2006–07
- Scottish Football League First Division: 2009–10
