= Ryan Brunt (footballer) =

English footballer

Personal information
- Full name: Ryan Samuel Brunt
- Date of birth: 26 May 1993 (age 33)
- Place of birth: Birmingham, England
- Height: 6 ft 2 in (1.88 m)
- Position: Forward

Youth career
- –2010: Bristol City
- 2010–2011: Stoke City

Senior career*
Years	Team	Apps	(Gls)
2011–2013	Stoke City	0	(0)
2011	→ Nantwich Town (loan)	0	(0)
2011	→ Luton Town (loan)	5	(0)
2012	→ Tranmere Rovers (loan)	15	(1)
2012–2013	→ Leyton Orient (loan)	18	(3)
2013–2015	Bristol Rovers	35	(5)
2014	→ York City (loan)	6	(0)
2014	→ Stevenage (loan)	5	(0)
2015–2017	Plymouth Argyle	50	(11)
2017–2018	Exeter City	1	(0)
2018–2020	Bath City	62	(16)
2020	Chippenham Town	4	(0)
Total		200	(36)
- * Club domestic league appearances and goals as of 16:09, 11 October 2020 (UTC)

Ryan Samuel Brunt (born 26 May 1993) is an English former professional footballer who played as a forward.

== Career ==
=== Stoke City ===
Born in Birmingham, West Midlands, Brunt started his football career with Bristol City's youth team before joining Stoke City's academy in 2010. Brunt began well at Stoke scoring a hat trick against Walsall reserves in September 2010. However Brunt missed most of the 2010–11 season after suffering a cruciate knee ligament injury. After recovering from his injury Brunt joined Northern Premier League Premier Division club Nantwich Town on loan and his first appearance for them was in the FA Cup first round against Milton Keynes Dons which Nantwich lost 6–0. Whilst still out on loan at Nantwich, Brunt played and scored in a reserve match for Stoke against Rotherham United. He impressed watching Luton Town manager Gary Brabin who signed Brunt on a month's work experience on 16 November 2011. He made six appearances for Luton before returning to Stoke after an extension could not be agreed.

On 27 January 2012, Brunt joined League One club Tranmere Rovers on a one-month loan. He made his Football League debut as an 85th-minute substitute in a 1–1 draw at home to Huddersfield Town. He scored his first professional goal with a low shot from a Martin Devaney cross in a 1–1 home draw with Charlton Athletic on 18 February 2012. Brunt extended his loan with Rovers for a second month.

On 17 July 2012, Brunt joined League One club Leyton Orient on a six-month loan. He scored his first goal for Orient in a 1–0 win over Brentford at home on 13 September 2012, despite appearing to be in an offside position. He ended his loan spell with Orient having scored three goals in 22 appearances.

=== Bristol Rovers ===
Brunt joined League Two club Bristol Rovers on 23 January 2013 on a two-and-a-half-year contract. He made his debut for Rovers in a 3–1 away win over Rotherham United on 26 January 2013, being fouled for a penalty kick that was scored before being substituted after 81 minutes. He scored his first goal for Rovers with a shot from a narrow angle during injury time of his home debut against Barnet in a 2–1 victory.

Brunt joined League Two club York City on 30 September 2014 on a one-month emergency loan, with his debut coming in a 0–0 home draw with Portsmouth on 4 October. He made six appearances for York before the loan expired on 1 November 2014. Brunt returned to Bristol Rovers and started the matches against Tranmere Rovers, Alfreton Town and Kidderminster Harriers before the arrival of Nathan Blissett and Bradley Goldberg on loan pushed Brunt back down the pecking order at Rovers. He was loaned out again on 27 November 2014, this time to League Two side Stevenage until January 2015.

=== Plymouth Argyle ===
On 20 January 2015, Brunt signed for League Two club Plymouth Argyle on an 18-month contract. Brunt suffered a serious knee injury in the 1–0 away defeat to Barnet on 1 March. This sidelined him for over nine months, missing the entire first half of the 2016–17 season. He was released by the club at the end of 2016–17, and turned down the opportunity to train with the club in pre-season.

=== Exeter City ===
Brunt signed for League Two club Exeter City on 1 August 2017 on an undisclosed-length contract following a successful trial. He was released by Exeter at the end of the 2017–18 season.

=== Bath City ===
Brunt signed for National League South club Bath City on 30 June 2018 on a one-year contract. The 2018–19 season ended in disappointment as Bath lost in the Play off eliminator to Wealdstone with Brunt being sent off for a dangerous tackle in the 73rd minute. The following season ended in similar fashion when Bath fell at the same hurdle. After the season had concluded early due to the coronavirus pandemic, Bath again lost the playoff eliminator with Brunt scoring as Dorking Wanderers ran out 2-1 victors. Brunt departed Bath on 29 July 2020.

=== Chippenham Town ===
Brunt joined fellow National League South side Chippenham Town on 9 October 2020, signing a short-term deal.

== Career statistics ==
Appearances and goals by club, season and competition
Club	Season	League			FA Cup		League Cup		Other		Total	
Club	Season	Division	Apps	Goals	Apps	Goals	Apps	Goals	Apps	Goals	Apps	Goals
Stoke City	2011–12	Premier League	0	0	—		0	0	0	0	0	0
Stoke City	2012–13	Premier League	0	0	0	0	—		—		0	0
Stoke City	Total		0	0	0	0	0	0	0	0	0	0
Nantwich Town (loan)	2011–12	NPL Premier Division	0	0	1	0	—		0	0	1	0
Luton Town (loan)	2011–12	Conference Premier	5	0	—		—		1 (Note: Appearance in FA Trophy)	0	6	0
Tranmere Rovers (loan)	2011–12	League One	15	1	—		—		—		15	1
Leyton Orient (loan)	2012–13	League One	18	3	2	0	1	0	1 (Note: Appearance(s) in Football League Trophy)	0	22	3
Bristol Rovers	2012–13	League Two	18	5	—		—		—		18	5
Bristol Rovers	2013–14	League Two	11	0	1	0	0	0	1	0	13	0
Bristol Rovers	2014–15	Conference Premier	6	0	1	0	—		—		7	0
Bristol Rovers	Total		35	5	2	0	0	0	1	0	38	5
York City (loan)	2014–15	League Two	6	0	—		—		—		6	0
Stevenage (loan)	2014–15	League Two	5	0	—		—		—		5	0
Plymouth Argyle	2014–15	League Two	16	2	—		—		2 (Note: Appearances in League Two play-offs)	1	18	3
Plymouth Argyle	2015–16	League Two	34	9	1	0	1	0	3	1	39	10
Plymouth Argyle	2016–17	League Two	0	0	0	0	0	0	0	0	0	0
Plymouth Argyle	Total		50	11	1	0	1	0	5	2	57	13
Exeter City	2017–18	League Two	1	0	0	0	1	0	0	0	2	0
Bath City	2018–19	National League South	33	9	3	1	—		3 (Note: Two appearances in the FA Trophy and one appearance in the National League South Play Offs)	0	39	10
Bath City	2019–20	National League South	29	7	2	2	—		6 (Note: 5 appearances and three goals in FA Trophy and one appearance and one goal in the National League South Play Offs)	4	37	13
Bath City	Total		62	16	5	3	—		9	4	76	23
Chippenham Town	2020–21	National League South	4	0	0	0	—		0	0	4	0
Career total			200	36	11	3	3	0	17	6	232	45

== Personal life ==
In 2013 Brunt started fitness business RecoverFit, supplying recovery and fitness equipment to clients including Anthony Joshua and Swansea City. In 2017, RecoverFit signed a deal with the NFL to supply their recovery systems for their UK fixtures.
