= Anthony O'Connor (footballer) =

Irish footballer

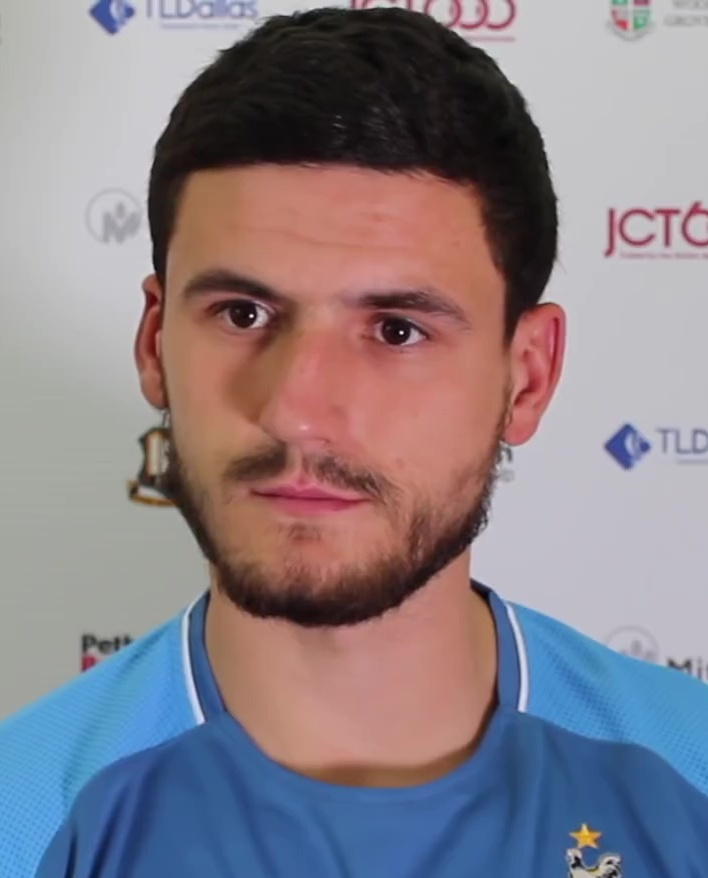

Personal information
- Full name: Anthony Dean O'Connor
- Date of birth: 25 October 1992 (age 34)
- Place of birth: Cork, Ireland
- Height: 1.88 m (6 ft 2 in)
- Positions: Defender; midfielder

Youth career
- 2008–2011: Blackburn Rovers

Senior career*
Years	Team	Apps	(Gls)
2011–2015	Blackburn Rovers	0	(0)
2012–2013	→ Burton Albion (loan)	48	(0)
2013–2014	→ Torquay United (loan)	31	(0)
2014–2015	→ Plymouth Argyle (loan)	24	(0)
2015	Plymouth Argyle	18	(3)
2015–2016	Burton Albion	21	(1)
2016–2018	Aberdeen	70	(5)
2018–2021	Bradford City	123	(8)
2021–2023	Morecambe	50	(3)
2023–2026	Harrogate Town	134	(7)
2026	Galway United	10	(0)

International career
2008	Republic of Ireland U17	3	(0)
2010–2011	Republic of Ireland U19	9	(2)
2013	Republic of Ireland U21	8	(0)
- * Club domestic league appearances and goals as of 22:09, 4 November 2026 (UTC)

Anthony Dean O'Connor (born 25 October 1992) is an Irish footballer who played most recently for League of Ireland Premier Division club Galway United. He can play as a defender or as a midfielder. He previously played in Scotland for Aberdeen and in England for Blackburn Rovers, Torquay United, Plymouth Argyle, Burton Albion, Bradford City, Morecambe and Harrogate Town, and has played for the Republic of Ireland at U17, U19 and U21 levels.

== Career ==
=== Blackburn Rovers ===
Born in Cork, O'Connor joined the academy setup at Blackburn Rovers 2008, having previously played for Kilreen Celtic and Nu Farm. In the summer of 2010, O'Connor signed his first professional contract.

In the summer of 2012, O'Connor signed a one-year contract extension with Blackburn Rovers, and, after a successful loan spell at Burton Albion, Blackburn Rovers manager Steve Kean rewarded O'Connor with a new, improved 2 1/2-year extension, which would keep him at Blackburn until the summer of 2015. Ahead of the 2013–14 season, O'Connor was given the number 28 shirt at the club.

==== Burton Albion (loan) ====
On 15 August 2012, he joined Football League Two side Burton Albion on an initial one-month loan. His professional debut for Burton came on 18 August 2012, in a 3–0 defeat to Rotherham United at the New York Stadium. On 11 September 2013, O'Connor's loan spell at Burton was extended to January 2013. During that time, he became a regular at the Pirelli Stadium. His loan spell was again extended, this time until the end of the season. In his time at Burton Albion, Gary Rowett said O'Connor was good enough to play in the championship for Blackburn but needed to be given the opportunity. In total, O'Connor made 53 appearances in all competitions for the club during the 2012–13 season, reaching the play-off semifinal, where they lost to Bradford City 5–4 over two legs. Burton Albion attempted to sign O'Connor, but were unsuccessful.

==== Torquay United (loan) ====
On 1 October 2013, O'Connor joined League Two side Torquay United on a one-month loan deal. On 29 October 2013, O'Connor extended his loan at Torquay by a further month, keeping him at Plainmoor until 30 November 2013. Alan Knill praised the 21-year-old for his performances saying: "if there is a better young defender in the league, I haven't seen him". Two days after his loan had expired, Torquay decided to extend his stay by a further month, keeping him at the club until the end of December 2013. Shortly after extending his loan spell, O'Connor was named as the club's Player of the Month for November. Through the season, O'Connor was unable to help the club survive relegation to the Football Conference, making 31 appearance and being named 2013–14 Young Player of the Season.

==== Plymouth Argyle (loan) ====
Despite aiming to make a breakthrough for Blackburn Rovers in the 2014–15 season, O'Connor joined Plymouth Argyle on loan until 10 January 2015. On 16 August 2014 O'Connor made his Plymouth debut, playing as defensive midfielder, in a 3–0 win over rivals, Exeter City. Between August and February, O'Connor "operated in a holding role in front of the defence" and played "either in a midfield holding role or as a centre-back" which led manager John Sheridan to praise his performances, labelling O'Connor his most important player.

=== Plymouth Argyle ===
On 2 February 2015, O'Connor signed for Plymouth Argyle, with Plymouth taking over Blackburn's existing contract for the defender, which was set to expire at the end of the season. Sheridan admitted that his side missed O'Connor because of the high standards he sets. A successful spell followed, which saw the League Two side rocket up to 4th in the table. O'Connor's first game after signing for the club on a permanent basis came five days later, in a 1–0 win over Accrington Stanley. O'Connor scored his first Plymouth goal on 7 March 2015, in a 2–0 win over Northampton Town; however, O'Connor suffered a groin injury that kept him out for a month. O'Connor made his return to the first team against Mansfield Town on 11 April 2015, when he scored in a 2–1 win, followed up by scoring again in a 1–1 draw against AFC Wimbledon on 14 April 2015. Argyle reached the playoffs, losing to Wycombe Wanderers 5–3 over two legs in the semi-final.

=== Burton Albion ===
On 18 July 2015, O'Connor signed a two-year deal with Burton Albion after turning down a contract offer from Plymouth Argyle, returning to the club where he had spent the 2012–13 season on loan. O'Connor helped his side win promotion to the Championship for the first time in their history.

=== Aberdeen ===
On 25 June 2016, O'Connor signed a deal with Aberdeen, subject to International clearance. On 7 July 2016, he made his debut in the second leg of the Europa League First qualifying round tie against Fola Esch. O'Connor became a regular in the side very quickly and manager Derek McInnes labelled him 'obsessed' and his obsession could make him a star. On 4 November 2016, he scored his first goal for the club in a 2–1 win away to Partick Thistle. O'Connor finished the 2016/2017 season with 3 goals, got to the Scottish League Cup and Scottish Cup final and helped his side to a second-place finish behind Celtic.

O'Connor began the 2017–2018 season in really good form playing in the Europa League qualifiers, which his side would eventually go out to Apollol Limassol in the third round. O'Connor played a key role in the heart of the defence and sometimes operating in midfield playing every game of the 17/18 season, helping his side to another second-place finish behind Celtic. Despite Aberdeen trying to tie O'Connor down to a long-term deal, he decided he wanted to return to England.

=== Bradford City ===
He signed a three-year contract with Bradford City in June 2018. He was made club captain by October 2018. He was replaced as captain by Paul Caddis in February 2019.

On 12 May 2021 he was one of nine players that Bradford City announced would leave the club on 30 June 2021 when their contracts expire.

=== Morecambe ===
In June 2021, O'Connor signed for Morecambe on a two-year deal.

=== Harrogate Town ===
On 11 January 2023, O'Connor's Morecambe contract was terminated by mutual consent, allowing him to join Harrogate Town.

=== Galway United ===
On 13 August 2026, O'Connor signed for League of Ireland Premier Division club Galway United on a short term deal until the end of their season in October. He made 13 appearances in all competitions before it was announced in November 2026 that he would be departing the club.

== International career ==
In 2008, O'Connor was called up by Republic of Ireland U17 squad for the qualifying phase of the UEFA Under 17s Championship. After this, O'Connor had represented Republic of Ireland U19 and Republic of Ireland U21.

== Career statistics ==
As of match played on 30 October 2026

Club	Season	Division	League		National Cup (Note: Includes FA Cup & FAI Cup)		League Cup (Note: Includes EFL Cup)		Other		Total	
Club	Season	Division	Apps	Goals	Apps	Goals	Apps	Goals	Apps	Goals	Apps	Goals
Blackburn Rovers	2012–13	Championship	0	0	0	0	0	0	0	0	0	0
Blackburn Rovers	2013–14	Championship	0	0	0	0	0	0	0	0	0	0
Blackburn Rovers	2014–15	Championship	0	0	0	0	0	0	0	0	0	0
Blackburn Rovers	Total		0	0	0	0	0	0	0	0	0	0
Burton Albion (loan)	2012–13	League Two	48	0	3	0	2	0	0	0	53	0
Torquay United (loan)	2013–14	League Two	31	0	1	0	0	0	0	0	32	0
Plymouth Argyle (loan)	2014–15	League Two	24	0	2	0	1	0	2 (Note: Appearance in Football League Trophy)	0	29	0
Plymouth Argyle	2014–15	League Two	18	3	0	0	0	0	0	0	18	3
Burton Albion	2015–16	League One	21	1	0	0	2	0	1	0	24	1
Aberdeen	2016–17	Scottish Premiership	32	3	4	0	4	0	1 (Note: Appearances in UEFA Europa League)	0	41	3
Aberdeen	2017–18	Scottish Premiership	38	2	5	0	2	0	4	0	49	2
Aberdeen	Total		70	5	9	0	6	0	5	0	90	5
Bradford City	2018–19	League One	42	6	4	0	1	0	2	0	49	6
Bradford City	2019–20	League Two	36	0	2	0	1	0	0	0	39	0
Bradford City	2020–21	League Two	45	2	2	1	2	0	0	0	49	3
Bradford City	Total		123	8	8	1	4	0	2	0	137	9
Morecambe	2021–22	League One	40	2	3	1	2	1	1	0	46	4
Morecambe	2022–23	League One	10	1	1	0	2	0	3	0	16	1
Morecambe	Total		50	3	4	1	4	1	4	0	62	5
Harrogate Town	2022–23	League Two	20	2	0	0	0	0	0	0	20	2
Harrogate Town	2023–24	League Two	43	4	2	0	1	0	1	1	47	5
Harrogate Town	2024–25	League Two	45	1	3	0	2	0	1	0	51	1
Harrogate Town	2025–26	League Two	26	0	1	1	0	0	4	1	31	2
Harrogate Town	Total		134	7	6	1	3	0	6	2	148	10
Galway United	2026	LOI Premier Division	10	0	3	0	—		—		13	0
Career Total			529	27	36	3	22	1	20	2	607	33
