= Jamie Richards (footballer) =

English footballer

Personal information
- Full name: Jamie Alexander Richards
- Date of birth: 24 June 1994 (age 32)
- Place of birth: Southend-on-Sea, England
- Position: Central defender

Team information
- Current team: Taunton Town
- Number: 22

Youth career
- Southend United
- 2004–2011: Plymouth Argyle

Senior career*
Years	Team	Apps	(Gls)
2011–2015	Plymouth Argyle	3	(0)
2013	→ Weymouth (loan)	8	(0)
2014	→ Weymouth (loan)	12	(1)
2014–2015	→ Linfield (loan)	15	(0)
2015	→ Dartford (loan)	16	(0)
2015–2016	Torquay United	3	(0)
2016–2022	Truro City	275	(19)
2022–2024	Tiverton Town	80	(14)
2024–2025	Willand Rovers	48	(5)
2025–	Taunton Town	42	(6)
- * Club domestic league appearances and goals as of 13/10/2025

Jamie Alexander Richards (born 24 June 1994) is an English professional footballer who plays as a defender for Taunton Town.

Born in Southend-on-Sea, he progressed through Plymouth Argyle's youth system to make his Football League debut in 2013.

== Career ==
Originally from Southend-on-Sea in Essex, Richards was a youth player at Southend United before moving to Newton Abbot in Devon. He joined Plymouth Argyle at the age of nine. Richards progressed through the club's centre of excellence and youth team to sign a three-year professional contract in July 2011. He made his senior debut in a Football League Trophy win against Aldershot Town in October 2012, and made his first appearance in the Football League against AFC Wimbledon in February 2013. In March, Richards joined Weymouth on loan until the end of the season, and made his debut against Redditch United. Richards returned to Weymouth on loan until the end of the season in March 2014, and scored against Bashley in his first game.

In June 2014, Richards joined Northern Irish Premiership side Linfield on a seven-month loan deal, linking up with former Argyle forward Warren Feeney, who had just become manager of the Belfast-based club in May. In July, he made his Linfield and European debut against B36 Tórshavn in the 2014–15 UEFA Europa League first qualifying round first leg. Linfield won 2–1, with Richards playing the entire 90 minutes. The Blues drew 1–1 in the second leg to go through to the next round 3–2 on aggregate. In the second round, Richards again played the full 90 minutes of the first leg, as Linfield celebrated their 100th competitive European match by defeating Swedish Allsvenskan side AIK 1–0. However, Linfield ultimately lost the away leg 2–0 and were eliminated 2–1 on aggregate.

In December 2014, he was sent out on loan to Conference Premier side Dartford on a one-month loan deal.

In 2016, Richards joined Truro City, and later went on to be club captain.

In June 2022, Richards joined Tiverton Town.

In June 2024, Richards joined Willand Rovers.

In October 2025, Richards joined Taunton Town.

== Career statistics ==
As of 9 July 2019

Appearances and goals by club, season and competition
Club	Season	League			National Cup		League Cup		Other		Total	
Club	Season	Division	Apps	Goals	Apps	Goals	Apps	Goals	Apps	Goals	Apps	Goals
Plymouth Argyle	2012–13	League Two	1	0	0	0	0	0	1 (Note: Appearance in Football League Trophy)	0	2	0
Plymouth Argyle	2013–14	League Two	1	0	0	0	0	0	0	0	1	0
Plymouth Argyle	2014–15	League Two	0	0	0	0	0	0	0	0	0	0
Plymouth Argyle	Total		2	0	0	0	0	0	1	0	3	0
Weymouth (loan)	2012–13	SFL - Premier Division	8	0	—		—		—		8	0
Weymouth (loan)	2013–14	SFL - Premier Division	12	1	—		—		—		12	1
Linfield (loan)	2014–15	NIFL Premiership	15	0	1	0	1	0	4 (Note: Four appearances in Europa League)	0	21	0
Dartford (loan)	2014–15	Conference Premier	16	0	—		—		0	0	16	0
Truro City	2015–16	National League South	32	2	0	0	—		4 (Note: Appearances in the FA Trophy)	0	36	2
Truro City	2016–17	National League South	42	3	0	0	—		2	0	44	3
Truro City	2017–18	National League South	38	2	2	0	—		1	0	41	2
Truro City	2018–19	National League South	39	4	0	0	—		2	0	41	4
Truro City	2019–20	SFL - Premier South	0	0	0	0	—		0	0	0	0
Truro City	Total		151	11	2	0	0	0	9	0	162	11
Career total			204	12	3	0	1	0	14	0	222	12
