= Tyler Harvey (footballer) =

English footballer

Personal information
- Full name: Tyler Marshall Harvey
- Date of birth: 29 June 1995 (age 31)
- Place of birth: Plymouth, England
- Height: 1.86 m (6 ft 1 in)
- Positions: Midfielder; forward

Team information
- Current team: Truro City
- Number: 9

Youth career
- 2004–2012: Plymouth Argyle

Senior career*
Years	Team	Apps	(Gls)
2012–2016	Plymouth Argyle	50	(5)
2013–2014	→ Salisbury City (loan)	4	(1)
2016	→ Bath City (loan)	6	(4)
2016–2017	Wrexham	11	(0)
2016–2017	→ Bath City (loan)	3	(0)
2017–2019	Truro City	88	(38)
2019	Bath City	7	(3)
2019–	Truro City	171	(107)
- * Club domestic league appearances and goals as of 21:28, 26 April 2025 (UTC)

Tyler Marshall Harvey (born 29 June 1995) is an English professional footballer who plays as a midfielder and a forward for Truro City. He made his debut in the Football League in 2012.

== Career ==
Born in Plymouth, Harvey joined Plymouth Argyle's Centre of Excellence in July 2004, at the age of nine. Aged 17 at the start of the 2012–13 season, his goal record for the youth side brought him to the attention of manager Carl Fletcher, as well as bigger clubs. He made his first team debut on 20 November 2012, in a 1–0 defeat to Bradford City at Valley Parade, after coming on for Paris Cowan-Hall after 74 minutes. He scored his first goal on his first start in a 1–1 boxing day draw with Torquay United at Home Park. In November 2013, Harvey joined Salisbury City on a youth loan until January 2014. He scored once in four games for Salisbury, the goal coming in a 3–1 win over Woking. His only goal of the 2013–14 season for Argyle was a header in a 2–1 win over Newport County.

On 16 August 2014, Harvey scored his first goal of the 2014–15 season, a free kick in the Devon Derby against Exeter City.

In February 2016, Harvey joined Bath City on a three-month loan deal from Plymouth, under new manager Gary Owers.

On 11 April 2016, having scored four goals in six games for Bath, including a brace against Weston-super-Mare, Harvey was recalled to Plymouth for the remainder of the season due to injury to Reuben Reid. On 7 May 2016, Harvey scored a brace on the last day of the season in the 5–0 win against Hartlepool United.

On 28 July 2016, Harvey joined Wrexham on a one-year deal after rejecting a contract extension at Plymouth. He made his debut for the club on the opening day of the 2016–17 season, in a 0–0 draw with Dover Athletic. In November 2016, Harvey rejoined Bath City on an initial two-month loan spell. He returned to Wrexham in January 2017 but was released by the club after his contract was cancelled. Following his release, Harvey entered talks with Bath over returning to the club on a permanent deal but eventually joined National League South rivals Truro City.

In June 2019, Harvey returned to Bath City on a permanent transfer.

Harvey re-joined Truro City after just two months in Somerset, the club battled for promotion and were eventually successful in the 2022-23 season. Harvey signed a new contract in Cornwall at the beginning of the 2024-25 season. He went onto score 27 goals, making him the National League South top goal scorer as he helped Truro City achieve promotion to the National League for the first time in the clubs' history. In addition to the Golden Boot, he was later named as the league's Player of the Year.

== Career statistics ==
As of match played 26 December 2024

Appearances and goals by club, season and competition
Club	Season	League			FA Cup		League Cup		Other		Total	
Club	Season	Division	Apps	Goals	Apps	Goals	Apps	Goals	Apps	Goals	Apps	Goals
Plymouth Argyle	2012–13	League Two	10	1	0	0	0	0	1 (Note: Appearance(s) in Football League Trophy)	0	11	1
Plymouth Argyle	2013–14	League Two	21	1	1	0	1	0	1	0	24	1
Plymouth Argyle	2014–15	League Two	13	1	2	0	1	0	1	0	17	1
Plymouth Argyle	2015–16	League Two	6	2	1	0	0	0	1	0	8	2
Plymouth Argyle	Total		50	5	4	0	2	0	4	0	60	5
Salisbury City (loan)	2013–14	Conference Premier	4	1	—		—		1 (Note: Appearance(s) in FA Trophy)	0	5	1
Bath City (loan)	2015–16	National League South	6	4	—		—		—		6	4
Wrexham	2016–17	National League	11	0	2	0	—		0	0	13	0
Bath City (loan)	2016–17	National League South	3	0	—		—		2	2	5	2
Truro City	2016–17	National League South	15	5	—		—		—		15	5
Truro City	2017–18	National League South	35	11	4	2	—		3 (Note: Two appearances and one goal in FA Trophy, one appearance in National League South play-offs)	1	42	14
Truro City	2018–19	National League South	38	22	0	0	—		3	2	41	24
Truro City	Total		88	38	4	2	—		6	3	98	43
Bath City	2019–20	National League South	7	3	0	0	—		0	0	7	3
Truro City	2019–20	Southern League; Premier Division South	20	19	0	0	—		1	1	21	20
Truro City	2020–21	Southern League; Premier Division South	6	3	1	1	—		3	5	10	9
Truro City	2021–22	Southern League; Premier Division South	32	18	2	1	—		4	2	38	21
Truro City	2022–23	Southern League; Premier Division South	35	26	0	0	—		3 (Note: One appearance in FA Trophy, two appearances and two goals in Southern League Premier Division South play-offs)	2	38	28
Truro City	2023–24	National League South	33	14	1	0	—		1	0	35	14
Truro City	2024–25	National League South	45	27	1	0	—		0	0	46	27
Truro City	Total		171	107	5	2	—		12	10	188	119
Career total			340	158	15	4	2	0	25	15	382	177

== Honours ==
Individual

- National League South Player of the Season: 2024–25
- National League South Team of the Season: 2024–25
