= James Bittner =

English footballer

Personal information
- Full name: James Mark Bittner
- Date of birth: 2 February 1982 (age 44)
- Place of birth: Devizes, England
- Position: Goalkeeper

Team information
- Current team: Bristol Rovers (goalkeeping coach)

Youth career
- 1995–2000: Swindon Town

Senior career*
Years	Team	Apps	(Gls)
2000–2002	Fulham	0	(0)
2002	Bournemouth	0	(0)
2003	Queens Park Rangers	0	(0)
2003–2005	Exeter City	42	(0)
2005–2006	Torquay United	0	(0)
2006–2007	Woking	12	(0)
2007–2010	Salisbury City	86	(0)
2008	→ Chippenham Town (loan)	5	(0)
2010–2012	Forest Green Rovers	66	(0)
2012–2013	Hereford United	34	(0)
2013	Newport County	0	(0)
2013–2014	Salisbury City	7	(0)
2014–2016	Plymouth Argyle	2	(0)
2016–2018	Newport County	2	(0)
Total		256	(0)

Managerial career
- 2016: Newport County (joint caretaker)
- * Club domestic league appearances and goals

James Mark Bittner (born 2 February 1982) is an English former professional footballer who played as a goalkeeper. He is the goalkeeping coach at Bristol Rovers.

== Career ==
Bittner signed for Fulham in 2000 from Swindon Town by then manager Jean Tigana and spent two years at the club.

After spending time at Bournemouth and Queens Park Rangers he signed for Exeter City, playing 42 times for the club. This was then followed by two injury-plagued years at Torquay United and Woking.

After recovering from a long-term shoulder injury Bittner then joined Salisbury City in 2007. He played 86 games in three seasons at the club. He was loaned out to Chippenham Town for a month in September 2007 for a month after recovering from a broken finger.

Bittner joined Forest Green Rovers in 2010 and was awarded with the Supporters Player of the Season trophy for his performances in his first season at The New Lawn. In May 2011, Bittner signed a new contract until the summer of 2013. He stated after signing the new contract: "I had a couple of offers but there was no chance of me leaving. The club is financially sound now and with the gaffer (Dave Hockaday) and the chairman (Dale Vince) on board – the future is really bright." Manager Hockaday added: "James is as good as there is in the league and I am delighted to have him on board."

Bittner left for Hereford United in 2012, making 42 appearances, before joining Newport County on a short-term contract. After leaving Newport, he returned to Salisbury for a second spell as player coach.

Bittner signed for Plymouth Argyle in July 2014 as second-choice goalkeeper behind Luke McCormick. Bittner made his Plymouth Argyle debut on 24 January 2015, replacing the injured McCormick at half time. The match ended in a 1–1 draw.

In July 2015 Bittner signed a new player/coach contract with Plymouth Argyle after agreeing to take the role of the club's new goalkeeper coach under new manager Derek Adams.

On 16 June 2016, Bittner re-joined Newport County as goalkeeper player/coach under manager Warren Feeney. When Feeney and his assistant manager Andy Todd were sacked on 28 September 2016, Bittner and fellow first team coach Sean McCarthy were named joint caretaker managers. Their only matches in charge were a 2–1 home defeat against Swansea City Under-23s in the EFL Trophy fixture on 4 October and a League Two 0–0 draw versus Colchester United on 8 October. Graham Westley was appointed team manager effective from 10 October 2016 with Dino Maamria his assistant manager and Mccarthy released by the club. Bittner made his debut for Newport County on 22 October versus Plymouth Argyle replacing Joe Day in the 36th minute when Day was sent off. Plymouth won the match 3–1 In June 2017 Bittner signed a one-year contract extension and he was released by Newport at the end of the 2017–18 season.

== Coaching career ==
In July 2018 Bittner joined Reading as their under-23 goalkeeping coach. In October 2019 he was appointed the first-team goalkeeper coach of Reading. He then left the club in July 2022 after some changes were made to the coaching staff.

Bittner then joined Cheltenham Town as first team goalkeeper coach.

On 2 July 2024, Bittner followed former Cheltenham Town manager Darrell Clarke to Barnsley, joining the first-team coaching staff.

On 6 February 2025, Bittner joined fellow League One side Bristol Rovers as goalkeeping coach.
