= Aaron Bentley =

English footballer

Personal information
- Full name: Aaron Stuart James Bentley
- Date of birth: 8 November 1995 (age 31)
- Place of birth: Plymouth, England
- Height: 1.89 m (6 ft 2 1/2 in)
- Position: Centre back

Team information
- Current team: St Blazey

Youth career
- 2004–2010: Tamerton Foliot
- 2010–2014: Plymouth Argyle

Senior career*
Years	Team	Apps	(Gls)
2014–2016	Plymouth Argyle	3	(0)
2015	→ Alfreton Town (loan)	2	(0)
2016–2017	Truro City	27	(0)
2017–2019	Plymouth Parkway		
2019	Truro City	6	(0)
2019–2020	Plymouth Parkway		
2020-2021	Taunton Town		
2021-2022	Plymouth Parkway	14	(2)
2022-2025	Helston Athletic		
2025-2025	Plymouth Parkway		
2025-	St Blazey		
- * Club domestic league appearances and goals as of 22:54, 28 December 2017 (UTC)

Aaron Stuart James Bentley (born 8 November 1995) is an English footballer who plays as a central defender for Plymouth Parkway.

== Career ==
Bentley joined Plymouth Argyle's youth setup relatively late in 2010, after playing for local youth club Tamerton Foliot FC, ran by his father Chris. He signed a one-year professional deal in June 2014, being promoted to the main squad.

On 20 December 2014, Bentley made his professional debut, starting in a 3–0 home win against Dagenham & Redbridge for the League Two club.

Just days later on 28 December 2014, with it only being his 3rd professional start, he was red-carded for a tackle on Josh Ruffels while playing against Oxford United.

On 20 February 2015, Alfreton Town signed Bentley on a one-month long loan before being released from Plymouth on 15 January 2016 and then joining Truro City in February 2016.

On 1 June 2017, Aaron joined ambitious South West Peninsula League Premier side Plymouth Parkway as they sought to get promoted to the Western Football League for 2018–19.

On 15 February 2019, Bentley joined his former club Truro City. On 28 March 2019, Plymouth Parkway announced, that Bentley had returned to the club after only one month.

On 1 June 2020, he signed for Southern League Premier Division side Taunton Town.

On 26 August 2020, Bentley signed for Western League Premier Division side Tavistock A.F.C. in order to guarantee more game time.

== Personal life ==
Aaron is the older brother of fellow St Blazey defender Jordan Bentley.
