= 2016 Football League Two play-off final =

- The match took place at Wembley Stadium.
- Event: 2015–16 Football League Two
AFC Wimbledon	Plymouth Argyle
2	0
- Date: 30 May 2016
- Venue: Wembley Stadium, London
- Referee: Iain Williamson
- Attendance: 57,956

The 2016 Football League Two play-off final was an association football match played on 30 May 2016 at Wembley Stadium, London, between Plymouth Argyle and AFC Wimbledon. The match determined the fourth and final team to gain promotion from Football League Two, English football's fourth tier, to Football League One. The top three teams of the 2015–16 Football League Two season gained automatic promotion to League One, while those placed from fourth to seventh in the table took part in play-off semi-finals; the winners of these semi-finals competed for the final place for the 2016–17 season in League One. Plymouth Argyle finished in fifth place while Wimbledon ended the season in seventh position. Accrington Stanley and Portsmouth were the losing semi-finalists.

The final was played in front of 57,956 spectators and was refereed by Iain Williamson. The first half ended goalless, but in the 77th minute, substitute Adebayo Akinfenwa's first action was to help win a corner for Wimbledon, from which Lyle Taylor scored with a low shot past Luke McCormick. Ten minutes into stoppage time, Ade Azeez won a penalty which was scored by Akinfenwa to make it 2–0 which was the final score. It was Wimbledon's sixth promotion since the club's formation in 2002.

Wimbledon ended their following season in fifteenth place in the League One table, while Plymouth finished the next season in second position to gain automatic promotion to League One for the 2017–18 season.

== Route to the final ==
Football League Two final table, leading positions
Pos	Team	Pld	W	D	L	GF	GA	GD	Pts
1	Northampton Town	46	29	12	5	82	46	+36	99
2	Oxford United	46	24	14	8	84	41	+43	86
3	Bristol Rovers	46	26	7	13	77	46	+31	85
4	Accrington Stanley	46	24	13	9	74	48	+26	85
5	Plymouth Argyle	46	24	9	13	72	46	+26	81
6	Portsmouth	46	21	15	10	75	44	+31	78
7	AFC Wimbledon	46	21	12	13	64	50	+14	75

Plymouth Argyle finished the regular 2015–16 season in fifth place in Football League Two, the fourth tier of the English football league system, two positions ahead of AFC Wimbledon. Both therefore missed out on the three automatic places for promotion to Football League One and instead took part in the play-offs to determine the fourth promoted team. Plymouth Argyle finished four points behind Bristol Rovers (who were promoted in third place), five behind Oxford United (promoted in second) and eighteen behind league winners Northampton Town. Wimbledon ended the season two places and six points behind Plymouth Argyle.

Wimbledon's opponents in their play-off semi-final were Accrington Stanley with the first match of the two-legged tie being played on 14 May 2016 at Kingsmeadow in Greater London. After a goalless first half in which no shots on target were made by either side, Tom Beere's low shot three minutes into injury time beat Neil Etheridge in the Accrington goal to ensure the match ended 1–0. The second leg of the semi-final play-off took place four days later at the Crown Ground in Accrington. Josh Windass levelled the tie with a penalty six minutes before half-time after Scott Brown was fouled. Piero Mingoia then put Accrington ahead on aggregate with a strike in the 59th minute. Midway through the second half, a header from Adebayo Akinfenwa made it 2–1 and with no further change to the scoreline, the game went into extra time. Lyle Taylor then scored after Etheridge had saved an effort from Jake Reeves, and Wimbledon progressed to the final with a 3–2 aggregate victory.

In the second play-off semi-final, Plymouth Argyle faced Portsmouth and the first leg was played at Fratton Park in Portsmouth on 12 May 2016. A strike from the edge of Plymouth's penalty area from Marc McNulty gave the home side a third-minute lead but Jamille Matt equalised six minutes later with a header. On 19 minutes, Matt put Plymouth ahead with an overhead kick. Six minutes after half-time, Peter Hartley fouled McNulty in the box, and Gary Roberts converted the subsequent penalty to make it 2–2. The second leg was held at Home Park in Plymouth three days later. The home side dominated the game but did not score until injury time in the second half when Hartley converted Graham Carey's corner. The match ended 1–0 giving Plymouth a 3–2 aggregate win and progression to the play-off final at Wembley.

== Match ==
=== Background ===
Prior to the final, the teams had faced each other three times during the season. Plymouth had won the league match at Kingsmeadow in August 2015, followed by victory there in the EFL Trophy the following month. Wimbledon won the other league fixture between the sides, with a 2–1 victory in April 2016. AFC Wimbledon fans were allocated the West End of Wembley, while Plymouth Argyle supporters were seated in the East End. The referee for the match was Iain Williamson, assisted by Ron Ganfield and Paul Marsden. Tim Robinson was the fourth official and the reserve assistant referee was Tom Bramall. The live match was broadcast on Sky Sports in the UK, with highlights of the match shown later on Channel 5.

Wimbledon wore all-blue kit with yellow trim while Plymouth played in green-and-white striped shirts, green shorts and green-and-white socks.

=== Summary ===
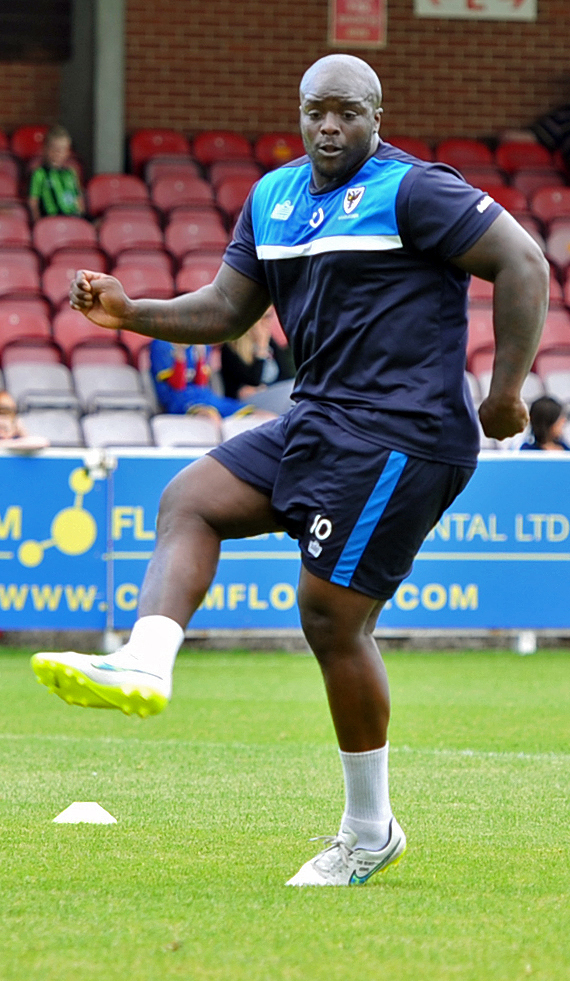
Adebayo Akinfenwa (pictured in 2015) scored a penalty for Wimbledon ten minutes into second-half injury time.

Plymouth Argyle kicked off the match at around 3 p.m. in front of 57,956 spectators. In the seventh minute, a header from a deep free-kick was flicked on by Taylor but his shot was saved, and soon after Carey's shot flew over the Wimbledon crossbar. Six minutes later, a Taylor shot was deflected out for a corner which was cleared to Reeves whose volley went wide of the Plymouth goal. In the 25th minute, Kelvin Mellor almost scored an own goal after deflecting a Wimbledon cross but the ball went wide, and Plymouth cleared the subsequent corner. Five minutes before half-time, a long-range strike from Callum Kennedy was saved by Luke McCormick in the Plymouth goal. After a minute of injury time, the referee blew the whistle to bring the half to an end with the score goalless.

The second half was kicked off by Wimbledon but the first chance fell to Plymouth on 47 minutes: a high cross intended for Jake Jervis was punched clear by Kelle Roos, the Wimbledon goalkeeper. Two minutes later, Carl McHugh's mis-hit pass almost beat his own goalkeeper but went wide for a corner. In the 56th minute, a shot from Andy Barcham was blocked before Tom Elliott headed over the bar from a Taylor cross. Gregg Wylde became the first player to be booked after being shown the yellow card for a foul on Wimbledon's Barry Fuller in the 63rd minute. Two minutes later, Carey's curling free kick from around 30 yards (27 m) was saved by Roos, then Darius Charles was booked for a foul on Matt. On 68 minutes, Plymouth made their first substitution of the afternoon with Jervis being replaced by Craig Tanner. Soon after, Jonathan Meades came on to replace Connor Smith for Wimbledon. In the 77th minute, Elliott left the pitch to be replaced by Akinfenwa whose first action a minute later was to help win a corner for Wimbledon, from which Taylor scored with a low shot past McCormick. The Plymouth goalkeeper made another save four minutes later before Reid came on to replace Wylde in the 83rd minute. Hartley was then injured in a clash with Akinfenwa and was stretchered off the pitch, and replaced by Jordon Forster. In the 90th minute, McCormick tipped away Akinfenwa's header to keep the score at 1–0, and the game went into seven minutes of injury time. Tanner was brought down in the 95th minute but the referee ignored appeals for a penalty from Plymouth before Taylor's weak shot after a one-on-one with McCormick was easily saved by the goalkeeper. Taylor was then replaced by Ade Azeez in Wimbledon's third substitution of the match. Ten minutes into stoppage time, Azeez won a penalty which was scored by Akinfenwa to make it 2–0 which was the final score.

=== Details ===
30 May 2016
15:00

AFC Wimbledon	2–0	Plymouth Argyle
Taylor 78'; Akinfenwa 90+10' (pen.)	Report

Wembley Stadium, London
Attendance: 57,956
Referee: Iain Williamson

AFC Wimbledon	Plymouth Argyle

GK	29	Kelle Roos
RB	2	Barry Fuller (c)
CB	6	Paul Robinson
CB	32	Darius Charles	(yellow card) 67'
LB	3	Callum Kennedy
RM	18	Connor Smith		(substituted off) 69'
CM	4	Dannie Bulman
CM	8	Jake Reeves
LM	17	Andy Barcham
CF	9	Tom Elliott		(substituted off) 77'
CF	33	Lyle Taylor	(yellow card) 79'	(substituted off) 90+7'
Substitutes:
GK	1	James Shea
DF	20	Ryan Sweeney
DF	12	Jonathan Meades		(substituted in) 69'
MF	11	Sean Rigg
FW	14	Ade Azeez		(substituted in) 90+7'
FW	39	Rhys Murphy
FW	10	Adebayo Akinfenwa	(yellow card) 90+11'	(substituted in) 77'
Manager:
Neal Ardley

GK	23	Luke McCormick
RB	2	Kelvin Mellor
CB	5	Curtis Nelson (c)
CB	6	Peter Hartley		(substituted off) 86'
LB	3	Gary Sawyer
DM	4	Carl McHugh
DM	20	Hiram Boateng
RW	14	Jake Jervis		(substituted off) 68'
AM	10	Graham Carey
LW	11	Gregg Wylde	(yellow card) 62'	(substituted off) 82'
CF	19	Jamille Matt
Substitutes:
GK	31	Vincent Dorel
DF	28	Jordon Forster		(substituted in) 86'
DF	16	Ben Purrington
MF	32	Jordan Houghton
FW	27	Craig Tanner		(substituted in) 68'
FW	15	Tyler Harvey
FW	9	Reuben Reid		(substituted in) 82'
Manager:
Derek Adams

== Post match ==
The scorer of Wimbledon's second goal, Akinfenwa revealed shortly after the end of the game that he had been released and that he was looking for a new club. It was Wimbledon's sixth promotion since the club's formation in 2002.

Wimbledon ended their following season in fifteenth place in the League One table. Plymouth finished the next season in second position in League Two to gain automatic promotion to League One for the 2017–18 season.
