= Arnold Garita =

Cameroonian footballer (born 1995)

Personal information
- Full name: Paul Arnold Garita
- Date of birth: 18 June 1995 (age 31)
- Place of birth: Douala, Cameroon
- Height: 1.86 m (6 ft 1 in)
- Position: Forward

Team information
- Current team: FCSB (on loan from Shenzhen Juniors)
- Number: 14

Youth career
- 2008–2010: CO Vincennes
- 2010–2012: Châteauroux

Senior career*
Years	Team	Apps	(Gls)
2012–2015	Châteauroux B	42	(23)
2012–2016	Châteauroux	29	(6)
2016–2018	Bristol City	0	(0)
2016–2017	→ Plymouth Argyle (loan)	14	(2)
2018–2021	Charleroi	0	(0)
2018–2019	→ Dunkerque (loan)	25	(9)
2019–2020	→ Boulogne (loan)	18	(4)
2020–2021	→ Villefranche (loan)	18	(7)
2021–2022	Bourg-en-Bresse	32	(10)
2022–2023	Argeș Pitești	36	(12)
2023–2024	Al-Faisaly	33	(12)
2024–2026	Hapoel Be'er Sheva	33	(5)
2026–	Shenzhen Juniors	13	(11)
2026–	→ FCSB (loan)	8	(1)
- * Club domestic league appearances and goals as of 24 October 2026

Paul Arnold Garita (born 18 June 1995) is a Cameroonian professional footballer who plays as a forward for Liga I club FCSB, on loan from China League One club Shenzhen Juniors.

== Career ==
=== Châteauroux ===
Born in Douala, Cameroon, Garita moved to France and started playing football at 13, leading him to join CO Vincennes. When he was 15, he left CO Vincennes to join Châteauroux, where he started his youth career. He progressed through the ranks of the Châteauroux academy despite the difficulties. By 2012, he was linked with away from the club, as he was on a basic youth contract, leading interests from Arsenal, Newcastle United, RCD Espanyol and VfL Wolfsburg.

He made his professional debut for LB Châteauroux, where he came on as a late substitute for Clément Tainmont, and scored an equaliser, in a 1–1 draw against AJ Auxerre on 30 November 2012. Having appeared two more times as a substitute later in the season, Garita signed his first professional contract with the club in February 2013. At the end of the 2012–13 season, he went on to make four appearances and scoring once in all competitions.

In the 2013–14 season, Garita spent the start of the season on the sidelines and didn't make his first appearance of the season, coming on as a late substitute, in a 2–2 draw against Stade Lavallois on 13 December 2013. Seven days later, on 20 December 2013, he scored twice, after coming on as a substitute in fourteen minutes from the game, in a 3–1 win over Dijon FCO. He scored against Dijon again this season on 6 May 2014, which saw Châteauroux lose 2–1. At the end of the 2013–14 season, Garita went on to make eight times and scoring three times in all competitions.

However, at the start of the 2014–15 season, he suffered an ankle injury that saw him on the sidelines. On 16 November 2014, he made his return from the sidelines against Meymac CA in the seventh round of Coupe de France and scored twice, in a 6–0 win. In a follow-up match against Auxerre five days later, he scored again, in a 3–1 loss. He later spent the rest of the 2014–15 season, appearing in a number of matches, as he went on to make fourteen appearances and scoring twice in all competitions.

In the 2015–16 season, with the club relegated to Championnat National, Garita remained in the first team despite facing limited time of football. He went on to make six appearances and scoring two times in all competitions.

=== Bristol City ===
Garita joined Bristol City on 7 January 2016, from French club Châteauroux for a fee of £50,000. He went on a trial last November and lasted for two weeks, which he impressed the side.

During his time at Bristol City, Garita fight for his place in the first team, but was demoted to the club's U23 side instead. This also included injury concerns. He did appear in the first team as an unused substitute in a quarter–final of Football League Cup, in a 2–1 win over Manchester United.

He was released by Bristol City at the end of the 2017–18 season, without making a single appearance for the side.

=== Plymouth Argyle (loan) ===
On 31 August 2016, the last day of the 2016 summer transfer window, Garita signed on loan for Plymouth Argyle initially for half of the 2016–17 season.

He made his Plymouth Argyle debut, where he came on as a substitute for Jake Jervis, in a 1–0 win over Cheltenham Town on 3 September 2016. Two weeks later, on 17 September 2016, he scored his first goal for the club, as well as, setting up a goal, in a 2–0 win over Exeter City. However, he suffered a hamstring injury shortly after and was sidelined for two months.

After spending two months on the sidelines, Garita made his return on 19 November 2016, where he started the match, in a 3–0 loss against Grimsby Town. Following his return from injury, he appeared in a number of matches, playing in the attacker role. Two months later, on 14 January 2017, he scored his second goal for the club, in a 4–2 win over Stevenage. Shortly after, his loan spell at Plymouth Argyle was extended until the end of the season.

However, by the end of January, Garita suffered another injury that kept him out for two months. On 8 April 2017, he made his return from injury, coming on as a substitute, in a 2–1 win over Crawley Town. At the end of the 2016–17 season, which saw Plymouth Argyle promoted to League One next season, Garita went on to make 18 appearances and scoring two times in all competitions. For his performance, he was awarded the club's Young Player of the Year.

=== Charleroi ===
On 31 August 2018, the last day of the 2018 summer transfer window, Garita joined Belgian First Division A side Charleroi and was immediately loaned out to Championnat National side USL Dunkerque.

In June 2019 it was announced, that Garita had been loaned out again, this time to US Boulogne for the 2019–20 season. A third season of loans to Championnat National sides, followed for the 2020–21 season, with Garita joining FC Villefranche in late June 2020.

=== Bourg-en-Bresse ===
On 1 July 2021, he signed with Bourg-en-Bresse, again in the Championnat National, on a permanent basis.

=== Argeș Pitești ===
On 12 July 2022, Garita signed a two-year contract with Argeș Pitești in Romania.

=== Al-Faisaly ===
On 9 July 2023, Garita joined Saudi First Division League club Al-Faisaly.

=== Hapoel Be'er Sheva ===
On 8 August 2024, Garita signed a two-year contract with Hapoel Be'er Sheva of the first Israeli Premier League.

=== Shenzhen Juniors ===
On 21 January 2026, Garita moved to China and joined China League One club Shenzhen Juniors.

== Career statistics ==
As of match played 24 October 2026

Appearances and goals by club, season and competition
Club	Season	League			National cup (Note: Includes Coupe de France, FA Cup, Cupa României, King's Cup, Israel State Cup, Chinese FA Cup)		Continental		Other		Total	
Club	Season	Division	Apps	Goals	Apps	Goals	Apps	Goals	Apps	Goals	Apps	Goals
Châteauroux B	2012–13	CFA 2	16	10	—		—		—		16	10
Châteauroux B	2013–14	CFA 2	14	8	—		—		—		14	8
Châteauroux B	2014–15	CFA 2	8	4	—		—		—		8	4
Châteauroux B	2015–16	CFA 2	4	1	—		—		—		4	1
Châteauroux B	Total		42	23	—		—		—		42	23
Châteauroux	2012–13	Ligue 2	3	1	1	0	—		—		4	1
Châteauroux	2013–14	Ligue 2	8	3	0	0	—		0	0	8	3
Châteauroux	2014–15	Ligue 2	13	1	3	2	—		0	0	16	3
Châteauroux	2015–16	Championnat National	5	1	0	0	—		1 (Note: Appearance in Coupe de la Ligue)	1	6	2
Châteauroux	Total		29	6	4	2	—		1	1	34	9
Bristol City	2015–16	Championship	0	0	0	0	—		—		0	0
Bristol City	2016–17	Championship	0	0	—		—		1 (Note: Appearance in EFL Cup)	0	1	0
Bristol City	Total		0	0	0	0	—		1	0	1	0
Plymouth Argyle (loan)	2016–17	League Two	14	2	3	0	—		—		17	2
Dunkerque (loan)	2018–19	Championnat National	25	9	2	4	—		—		27	13
Boulogne (loan)	2019–20	Championnat National	18	4	3	1	—		—		21	5
Villefranche (loan)	2020–21	Championnat National	18	7	1	0	—		2 (Note: Appearances in Ligue 2 promotion/relegation play-offs)	1	21	8
Bourg-en-Bresse	2021–22	Championnat National	32	10	3	1	—		—		35	11
Argeș Pitești	2022–23	Liga I	36	12	2	0	—		2 (Note: Appearances in Liga I promotion/relegation play-offs)	2	40	14
Al Faisaly	2023–24	Saudi First Division League	33	12	2	1	—		—		35	13
Hapoel Be'er Sheva	2024–25	Israeli Premier League	33	5	4	2	0	0	1 (Note: Appearance in Toto Cup)	0	38	7
Hapoel Be'er Sheva	2025–26	Israeli Premier League	0	0	0	0	1 (Note: Appearance in UEFA Conference League)	0	1	0	2	0
Hapoel Be'er Sheva	Total		33	5	4	2	1	0	2	0	40	7
Shenzhen Juniors	2026	China League One	13	11	1	1	—		—		14	12
FCSB (loan)	2026–27	Liga I	8	1	1	0	—		—		9	1
Career total			301	102	26	12	1	0	8	4	336	118

== Honours ==
Hapoel Beer Sheva

- Israel State Cup: 2024–25
- Israel Super Cup: 2025
