= Louis Rooney =

English footballer (born 1996)

Personal information
- Full name: Louis John Rooney
- Date of birth: 28 September 1996 (age 30)
- Place of birth: Plymouth, England
- Height: 5 ft 11 in (1.80 m)
- Position: Striker

Team information
- Current team: Torpoint Athletic

Youth career
- 2006–2015: Plymouth Argyle

Senior career*
Years	Team	Apps	(Gls)
2015–2017	Plymouth Argyle	4	(2)
2016	→ Truro City (loan)	4	(1)
2017	→ Hartlepool United (loan)	7	(0)
2017–2018	Linfield	20	(7)
2018–2022	Truro City	28	(10)
2021	→Bodmin Town (loan)	4	(0)
2023–	Torpoint Athletic	9	(3)

International career
2014	Northern Ireland U19	3	(0)
2016	Northern Ireland U21	2	(0)
- * Club domestic league appearances and goals as of 08:57, 13 May 2018 (UTC)

Louis John Rooney (born 28 September 1996) is an English professional footballer who plays as a striker for Torpoint Athletic.

== Career ==
=== Plymouth Argyle ===
Born on 28 September 1996, in Plymouth, England, Rooney joined the Plymouth Argyle academy at age 9 and progressed throughout the ranks.

After helping the club's U18 side win the Football League Youth Alliance Merit League One, Rooney signed his first professional contract with Argyle in June 2015 at the age of 18. He was awarded the Richard Phillips Trophy for "his ability, sportsmanship, work-rate, dedication and improvement".

In the 2015–16 season, Rooney was promoted to Plymouth Argyle's first team, and in the club's pre-season tour, he scored two hat-tricks against Tavistock and Saltash United. However, he spent the rest of the season at the first team at the substitute bench, with Reuben Reid, Jake Jervis, Deane Smalley, Craig Tanner and Ryan Brunt preferred instead. At one point, he was expected to be loaned out. However, the attempt was unsuccessful, and he stayed throughout the season. He made his professional debut in Argyle's final game of their 2015–16 League 2 season against Hartlepool. He marked his debut with two goals in a 5–0 victory, including a 25-yard strike which won the club's 'Goal of the season' competition. He was awarded with a new contract.

In the 2016–17 season, Rooney continued to remain in the first team since the start of the season and was overlooked, citing competitions. After his loan spell at Truro City, in which he suffered a hamstring injury, he made his first appearance of the 2016–17 season, coming on as a second-half substitute, in a 3–0 loss against Grimsby Town on 19 November 2016. Again, Rooney spent the next two months on the substitute bench and was expected to be loaned out once more. Upon returning to his parent club at the end of the 2016–17 season, Rooney was released by the club. Upon learning his release, he stated that he felt leaving the club was for him to "make his name somewhere".

=== Loan spells ===
In September 2016, he spent time on loan to National League South club Truro City. Rooney made his Truro City debut the next day, playing the whole game, in a 2–1 win over Wealdstone. After extending his loan spell until January 2017, Rooney scored his first Truro City goal, in a 2–2 draw against Eastbourne Borough on 22 October 2016. After scoring two more goals for the side, Rooney's time at Truro came to an end, and he returned to his parent club in November 2016 after suffering a hamstring during a match against St Albans City.

Rooney joined Hartlepool United on loan until the end of the 16/17 season, with the loan transfer being approved within the last minute of the January transfer window. He won the man of the match award on his Pools debut, a 1–1 draw with Yeovil Town. Several weeks later after making his debut, Rooney set up one of the goals, in a 2–1 loss against Colchester United. Although he went on to make seven appearances, he played the rest of the seven matches as a substitute. At the end of the 2016–17 season, he returned to his parent club.

In March 2021, Rooney had ACL surgery, after which he played a further 10 games for Truro City FC before undergoing further knee surgery. He then decided to retire from football. After a prolonged rehabilitation, he re-started his football career.

In July 2023, Rooney signed for Torpoint Athletic.

== International career ==
Though he was born in Plymouth, England, Rooney is eligible to play for Northern Ireland through his father, who was born in Belfast. In March 2014, Rooney was called up by Northern Ireland at under-19 for the first time. In the same month, he made his Northern Ireland U19 debut against Switzerland U19. Rooney went on to make two appearances for Northern Ireland U19 side.

Two years later, Rooney had represented under-21 levels after being called up in August 2016. He made his Northern Ireland U21 side on 2 September 2016, coming on as a second-half substitute, in a 1–0 loss against Iceland U21. Rooney went on to make two more appearances for the Northern Ireland U21 side.

== Personal life ==
Rooney's brother Daniel is a member of the Plymouth Argyle Under-18 squad and Northern Ireland Under-19 squad.

Growing up in Plymouth, England, Rooney attended South East Cornwall Schools at both primary and secondary levels and then Torpoint Community College.

He has recently gotten engaged.
