= Nauris Bulvītis =

Latvian footballer (born 1987)

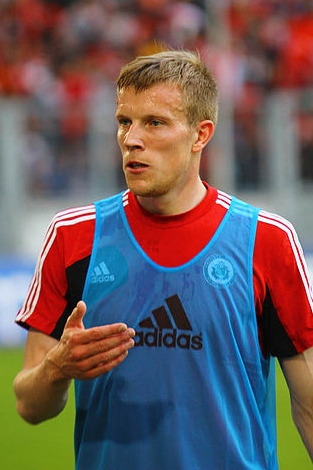
- Bulvītis warming up for Latvia

Personal information
- Full name: Nauris Bulvītis
- Date of birth: 15 March 1987 (age 39)
- Place of birth: Riga, Latvian SSR, Soviet Union
- Position: Centre back

Team information
- Current team: Spartaks Jūrmala
- Number: 16

Senior career*
Years	Team	Apps	(Gls)
2007	Daugava Daugavpils	7	(0)
2008	Šiauliai	21	(1)
2009–2010	Tranzit	17	(1)
2009–2010	→ Inverness Caledonian Thistle (loan)	32	(2)
2010	Ventspils	10	(0)
2011	Spartak Trnava	0	(0)
2011–2013	Spartaks Jūrmala	56	(9)
2013	Skonto Riga	15	(3)
2014	Aarau	22	(0)
2015–2016	Spartaks Jūrmala	37	(2)
2016–2017	Plymouth Argyle	18	(2)
2017–2018	Ventspils	32	(5)
2019	Rīgas FS	20	(2)
2020–	Spartaks Jūrmala	0	(0)

International career^{‡}
2006–2007	Latvia U19		
2007–2008	Latvia U21		
2012–	Latvia	19	(2)
- * Club domestic league appearances and goals as of 20:58, 10 May 2020 (UTC) ‡ National team caps and goals as of 26 September 2016 (UTC)

Nauris Bulvītis (born 15 March 1987) is a Latvian footballer who plays as a defender for FK Spartaks Jūrmala.

== Club career ==
Bulvītis started his professional career in 2007 with Daugava Daugavpils. Having played there for one season, he made 7 league appearances and scored no goals. In 2008, he had a one-year spell in the Lithuanian A Lyga with Šiauliai, playing 21 games and scoring once. In 2009 Bulvītis returned to his homeland, signing a contract with Tranzit. That season he played 17 matches and scored 1 goal in the Latvian Higher League, before being loaned to the Scottish First Division side Inverness Caledonian Thistle. He signed on loan until January 2010 after a successful trial spell at the club. He was recommended to join the club by fellow Latvian and former Inverness defender Pāvels Mihadjuks. Bulvītis made his debut for Caley Thistle in a Scottish League Cup match against Annan Athletic. He scored his first goal against Stranraer in the League cup. FC Tranzit permitted Bulvītis to extend his loan spell at Caley until the end of the season. Bulvītis left Inverness at the end of the 2009–10 season.

Bulvitis signed for the Latvian Higher League club Ventspils before the start of the Eurocups. He played 10 matches for Ventspils, scoring no goals. In January 2011 he went on trial with the Slovak Super Liga club Spartak Trnava and signed a two-and-a-half-year contract with them. Because of a long-term injury he was released by the Slovak side in the middle of 2011. Bulvītis then returned to Latvia, joining Spartaks Jūrmala. During three seasons with the club he scored nine goals in 56 league matches. In July 2013 Bulvītis joined Skonto Riga on a three-year contract. He played 15 league matches and scored three goals for the club before leaving the club in January 2014 due to a long-term delay of salary payment. On 24 January 2014 Bulvītis signed a one-year contract with the Swiss Super League club Aarau with an option to extend it for another season. In April 2014 his contract was extended for another year. During his first season in the Swiss Super League Bulvītis played 18 matches, scoring no goals.

In February 2016, Bulvītis went on trial with Kazakhstan Premier League side Shakhter Karagandy.

On 29 June 2016, Plymouth Argyle confirmed Bulvītis as a new signing. Bulvitis had scored all 3 of his Argyle goals in the month of August, netting his first in a 2–1 win away to Notts County, quickly followed by the only goal in a 1–0 win away to Blackpool, and then another goal in a 4–1 EFL Trophy game at home to Newport County. This early season run of form saw Bulvītis make an appearance as an auxiliary striker in Argyle's 1–0 defeat to Liverpool in an FA Cup third round replay. Bulvītis' back half of the season was plagued with injury problems as he eventually lost his centre half place to January signing Jakub Sokolík. At the end of a promotion winning 2016–17 season, Bulvītis was released by Argyle along with eight other professionals.

In September 2017, Bulvītis re-signed for Virslīga side Ventspils in his native Latvia, making 6 appearances between then and the end of the season in November as Ventspils came 4th in the Latvian Higher League on goal difference. Finishing 4th saw Ventspils qualify for the 2018–19 UEFA Europa League, with Bulvītis not featuring in their first qualifying round 8–3 aggregate win over Albanian side Luftëtari, but featuring off the bench in both legs of Ventspils' second qualifying round 3-1 aggregate defeat to French Ligue 1 side Girondins Bordeaux.

On 27 December 2018, Bulvītis signed with Rīgas FS for the 2019 season. In January 2020, Bulvītis returned to FK Spartaks Jūrmala.

== International career ==
Bulvītis has been capped internationally at under-19 and under-21 levels. In 2012 Latvia national football team coach Aleksandrs Starkovs called him up for the 2012 Baltic Cup. Nauris played 2 matches, helping Latvia win the tournament. Bulvītis scored his first international goal on 6 September 2013 in a 2–1 2014 FIFA World Cup qualification match victory over Lithuania. In May 2014 he helped Latvia win the Baltic Cup for the second time in a row, scoring the only goal in a 1–0 victory over Lithuania in the final of the tournament. As of March 2015 Bulvītis has played 19 international matches and scored two goals for Latvia.

=== International goals ===
#	Date	Venue	Opponent	Score	Result	Competition
1.	6 September 2013	(Latvia) Skonto Stadium, Riga	Lithuania	1–0	2–1	2014 FIFA World Cup qualification
2.	31 May 2014	(Latvia) Daugava Stadium, Liepāja	Lithuania	1–0	1–0	2014 Baltic Cup

== Honours ==
Inverness CT

- Scottish First Division champions: 2009–10

FK Ventspils

- Virslīga runners-up: 2010

Skonto Riga

- Virslīga runners-up: 2013

Plymouth Argyle

- EFL League Two runners-up: 2016–17

Latvia National Team

- Baltic Cup champions: 2012, 2014
