= 2016–17 Plymouth Argyle F.C. season =

English football club season

Plymouth Argyle
2016–17 season
- Chairman: James Brent
- Manager: Derek Adams
- Stadium: Home Park
- League Two: 2nd (Promoted)
- FA Cup: 3rd round (knocked out by Liverpool)
- EFL Cup: 1st round (knocked out by Reading)
- EFL Trophy: Knocked out at Group Stage
- Top goalscorer: League: Graham Carey (14); All: Graham Carey (15)
- Highest home attendance: League: 14,671 vs. Exeter (11 February 2017); All: 17,048 vs. Liverpool (18 January 2017)
- Lowest home attendance: League: 6,935 vs. Mansfield (20 August 2016); All: 5,071 vs. Newport County (3 December 2016)
- Average home league attendance: 9,652
Home colours	Away colours	Third colours

The 2016–17 season was Plymouth Argyle's sixth consecutive season in League Two and their 131st year in existence. Along with competing in League Two, the club also participated in the FA Cup, League Cup and League Trophy. The season covers the period from 1 July 2016 to 30 June 2017.

== Pre-season ==
9 July 2016 Friendly	St Blazey	0–9	Plymouth Argyle	St Blazey
19:30		Report	Jervis 20', 22', 76'; Slew 16', 81'; Goodwillie 33', 50'; Spencer 67'; Purrington 46'	Stadium: Blaise Park; Attendance: 1,000 (approx)

12 July 2016 Friendly	Tavistock	2–7	Plymouth Argyle	Tavistock
19:30	Hobbs 43' (pen.); McCargo 51'	Report	Battle 20', 76'; Spencer 31'; Goodwillie 41'; Rooney 68'; Jervis 81'; Carey 84'	Stadium: Langsford Park; Attendance: 1,600

13 July 2016 Friendly	Bovey Tracey	0–6	Plymouth Argyle	Bovey Tracey
19:30		Report	Carey 2'; Jervis 11'; Rooney 42'; Own Goal 66'; Spencer 72'; Goodwillie 83'	Stadium: Western Counties Roofing Ground

16 July 2016 Friendly	Torquay United	1–1	Plymouth Argyle	Torquay
19:30	Blissett (pen.), 54'	Report	Goodwillie 43'	Stadium: Plainmoor; Attendance: 2,474 (1,220 away); Referee: Hutchinson

19 July 2016 Friendly	Truro City	0–2	Plymouth Argyle	Truro
19:30		Report	Spencer 69'; Ijaha 71'	Stadium: Treyew Road; Attendance: 1,002

20 July 2016 Friendly	Elburton Villa	0–12	Plymouth Argyle	Elburton
19:30		Report	Goodwillie 9', 42', 45', 70'; Bradley 21', 50'; Carey 66', 89'; Spencer 33', 35'; Songo'o 71'; Jervis 90'	Stadium: Haye Road; Attendance: 953

23 July 2016 Friendly	Weymouth	1–1	Plymouth Argyle	Weymouth
19:30	Shephard (pen.), 59'	Report	Goodwillie 53'	Stadium: Bob Lucas Stadium

26 July 2016 Friendly	Maastricht	1–2	Plymouth Argyle	Maastricht
18:00	Verheydt 7'	Report	Goodwillie 22'; Songo'o 85'	Stadium: De Geusselt; Attendance: 1,467 (100+ away)

30 July 2016 Friendly	Plymouth Argyle	0–0	West Bromwich Albion	Plymouth
17:30		Report		Stadium: Home Park; Attendance: 8,021 (716 away)

== League Two ==
=== League table ===
Pos	Team	Pld	W	D	L	GF	GA	GD	Pts	Promotion, qualification or relegation
1	Portsmouth (C, P)	46	26	9	11	79	40	+39	87	Promotion to EFL League One
2	Plymouth Argyle (P)	46	26	9	11	71	46	+25	87	Promotion to EFL League One
3	Doncaster Rovers (P)	46	25	10	11	85	55	+30	85	Promotion to EFL League One
4	Luton Town	46	20	17	9	70	43	+27	77	Qualification for League Two play-offs (Note: Four teams play for one spot and promotion to EFL League One)
5	Exeter City	46	21	8	17	75	56	+19	71	Qualification for League Two play-offs

Updated to match(es) played on 6 May 2017. Source: BBC Sport
Rules for classification: 1) Points; 2) Goal difference; 3) Number of goals scored
(C) Champions; (P) Promoted

=== Results by round ===
Round	1	2	3	4	5	6	7	8	9	10	11	12	13	14	15	16	17	18	19	20	21	22	23	24	25	26	27	28	29	30	31	32	33	34	35	36	37	38	39	40	41	42	43	44	45	46
Ground	H	A	A	H	A	H	H	A	H	A	H	A	H	A	H	A	H	H	A	H	A	H	H	A	H	A	A	A	H	H	A	A	H	H	H	A	A	H	A	H	A	A	H	A	H	A
Result	L	L	W	W	W	W	W	W	D	W	W	W	D	W	W	W	L	L	L	W	W	D	W	L	W	W	L	W	W	L	D	D	L	W	L	W	D	W	W	L	W	D	W	D	W	D
Position	24	24	19	11	7	3	1	1	1	1	1	1	1	1	1	1	1	1	3	1	1	2	1	2	2	2	2	2	2	2	2	2	2	2	2	2	2	2	2	2	2	2	2	2	1	2

Updated to match(es) played on 6 May 2017. Source: BBC SPORT
A = Away; H = Home; W = Win; D = Draw; L = Loss

=== Matches ===
On 22 June 2016, the fixtures for the forthcoming season were announced.

6 August 2016 1	Plymouth Argyle	0–3	Luton Town	Plymouth
15:00 BST	Miller (yellow card) 45+2'	Report	Hylton (yellow card) 26' (goal) 50'; Ruddock (yellow card) 55'; Marriott 69'; Potts (yellow card) 71' (yellow-red card) 88'; Smith 90+6'; McGeehan (yellow card) 90+8'	Stadium: Home Park; Attendance: 9,761 (1,094 away); Referee: Lee Collins

13 August 2016 2	Carlisle United	1–0	Plymouth Argyle	Carlisle
15:00 BST	Lambe 37'; Grainger (yellow card) 63'	Report	Threlkeld (yellow card) 37'; Songo'o (yellow card) 53'; Smith (yellow card) 90'	Stadium: Brunton Park; Attendance: 5,129 (362 away); Referee: Andy Haines

16 August 2016 3	Notts County	1–2	Plymouth Argyle	Nottingham
19:45 BST	Stead 17'; Dickinson (yellow card) 48'; Opoku Aborah (yellow card) 71'	Report	Jervis 14'; Bulvitis 34'; Miller (yellow card) 42'; Songo'o (yellow card) 70'; Sawyer (yellow card) 84'; Smith (yellow card) 88'; McCormick (yellow card) 89'	Stadium: Meadow Lane; Attendance: 3,718 (366 away); Referee: Mark Heywood

20 August 2016 4	Plymouth Argyle	2–0	Mansfield Town	Plymouth
15:00 BST	Carey 19', 24'; Bradley (yellow card) 72'; Slew (yellow card) 87'	Report		Stadium: Home Park; Attendance: 6,935 (209 away); Referee: Brendan Malone

27 August 2016 5	Blackpool	0–1	Plymouth Argyle	Blackpool
15:00 BST	Payne (red card) 70'; Robertson (yellow card) 85'	Report	Bulvitis 50'; Songo'o (yellow card) 64'; Spencer (yellow card) 71'	Stadium: Bloomfield Road; Attendance: 3,085 (626 away); Referee: Nigel Miller

3 September 2016 6	Plymouth Argyle	1–0	Cheltenham Town	Plymouth
15:00 BST	Garita (yellow card) 58'; Bradley 90'	Report	Hall (yellow card) 44'; Rowe (yellow card) 69'; Wright (yellow card) 81'	Stadium: Home Park; Attendance: 7,552 (262 away); Referee: Nick Kinseley

10 September 2016 7	Plymouth Argyle	2–1	Cambridge United	Plymouth
15:00 BST	Carey 9'; Slew 59'	Report	Elito 80'	Stadium: Home Park; Attendance: 7,068 (144 away); Referee: Lee Probert

17 September 2016 8	Exeter City	0–2	Plymouth Argyle	Exeter
15:00 BST		Report	Carey 5'; Garita 26'	Stadium: St James' Park; Attendance: 6,612 (1,700 away); Referee: Whitestone

24 September 2016 9	Plymouth Argyle	1–1	Hartlepool United	Plymouth
15:00 BST	Miller (yellow card) 68'; Jervis (pen.), 84'	Report	Thomas 21'; Harrison (red card); Nsiala (yellow card) 82'; Paynter (yellow card) 84'; Deverdics (yellow card) 90+1'	Stadium: Home Park; Attendance: 7,591 (69 away); Referee: Eltringham

27 September 2016 10	Leyton Orient	0–2	Plymouth Argyle	Leyton, London
19:45 BST	Weir (red card) 1'; Janse (red card) 14'; Hunt (yellow card) 67'	Report	Spencer 11'; Purrington (yellow card) 37'; Bulvitis (yellow card) 55'; Carey (yellow card) 82'; Donaldson 84'	Stadium: Matchroom Stadium; Attendance: 4,366 (1,418 away); Referee: Charles Breakspear

1 October 2016 11	Plymouth Argyle	4–1	Yeovil Town	Plymouth
15:00 BST	Fox (yellow card) 7'; Spencer 39'; Jervis 43', 86'; Carey 71'; Tanner (yellow card) 84'	Report	Smith (yellow card) 35'; Ward 45'; Hedges (yellow card) 62'; Dawson (yellow card) 67'	Stadium: Home Park; Attendance: 8,529 (495 away); Referee: Seb Stockbridge

8 October 2016 12	Stevenage	1–2	Plymouth Argyle	Stevenage
15:00 BST	Godden (yellow card) 29'; Bradley 54' (o.g.); Henry (yellow card) 46'; Cowans (yellow card) 69'; Franks (yellow card) 78'	Report	Bradley 47' 58'; Spencer (yellow card) 50'; Purrington (yellow card) 69'; Jervis (yellow card) 85'	Stadium: Lamex Stadium; Attendance: 2,881 (1,204 away); Referee: Ross Joyce

15 October 2016 13	Plymouth Argyle	2–2	Portsmouth	Plymouth
15:00 BST	Songo'o 21' (yellow card) 48'; Slew (yellow card) 70'; Purrington (yellow card) 74'; Smith 89'	Report	Bennett 40'; Evans (yellow card) 42'; Chaplin (yellow card) 45'; Rose 86'	Stadium: Home Park; Attendance: 13,508 (1,582 away); Referee: Darren Handley

22 October 2016 14	Newport County	1–3	Plymouth Argyle	Newport
15:00 BST	Barnum-Bobb (yellow card) 28'; Cameron (yellow card) 33'; Grego-Cox (yellow card) 33'; Day (red card) 38'; Parkin 50'	Report	Carey (pen.), 38' (pen.), 55'; Slew 78'; Spencer (yellow card) 82'	Stadium: Rodney Parade; Attendance: 3,460 (1,267 away); Referee: Michael Salisbury

29 October 2016 15	Plymouth Argyle	2–1	Colchester United	Plymouth
15:00 BST	Tanner 16'; Bulvītis (yellow card) 68'; Carey (yellow card) 72'; Donaldson 87'	Report	Slater 31'; Wynter (yellow card) 56'	Stadium: Home Park; Attendance: 8,650 (204 away); Referee: Kevin Johnson

13 November 2016 16	Crewe Alexandra	1–2	Plymouth Argyle	Crewe
15:00 GMT	Kiwomya 16'	Report	Tanner 41'; Donaldson (yellow card) 52'; Carey 74'	Stadium: Alexandra Stadium; Attendance: 4,573 (1,106 away); Referee: Nigel Miller

19 November 2016 17	Plymouth Argyle	0–3	Grimsby Town	Plymouth
15:00 GMT		Report	Collins 44'; Bogle 62', 86'	Stadium: Home Park; Attendance: 10,241 (335 away); Referee: Rob Jones

22 November 2016 18	Plymouth Argyle	0–2	Barnet	Plymouth
19:45 GMT	Smith (yellow card) 62'	Report	Dembélé 7'; Akinde 45'; Watson (yellow card) 62'	Stadium: Home Park; Attendance: 7,188 (59 away); Referee: Brett Huxtable

26 November 2016 19	Morecambe	2–1	Plymouth Argyle	Morecambe
15:00 GMT	Rose 20' (pen.) (yellow card) 22'; Ellison (yellow card) 26'; Murphy 63'; Wakefield (yellow card) 83'	Report	Donaldson (yellow card) 24'; Slew (yellow card) 25' (yellow-red card) 47'; Threlkeld 44'	Stadium: Globe Arena; Attendance: 1,435 (400+ away); Referee: Darren England

10 December 2016 20	Plymouth Argyle	2–0	Doncaster Rovers	Plymouth
15:00 GMT	Carey 33'; Jervis 63' (pen.); Smith (yellow card) 79'	Report	Mandeville (penalty missed) 89'; Coppinger (red card) 90'	Stadium: Home Park; Attendance: 8,575 (395 away); Referee: Oliver Langford

17 December 2016 21	Accrington Stanley	0–1	Plymouth Argyle	Accrington
15:00 GMT	Hughes (yellow card) 65'	Report	Tanner (yellow card) 64' (goal) 76'; Garita (yellow card) 82'	Stadium: Wham Stadium; Attendance: 1,573 (934 away); Referee: Scott Duncan

26 December 2016 22	Plymouth Argyle	3–3	Wycombe Wanderers	Plymouth
15:00 GMT	Slew 18'; Jervis 40'; Songo'o 56'; Threlkeld (yellow card) 88'	Report	Kashket 8' (yellow card) 82'; Akinfenwa 59'; Weston 89'; Stewart (yellow card) 90+2'; Jacobson (yellow card) 90+4'	Stadium: Home Park; Attendance: 12,210; Referee: Graham Salisbury

31 December 2016 23	Plymouth Argyle	2–0	Crawley Town	Plymouth
15:00 GMT	Miller (yellow card) 35'; Songo'o (yellow card) 44'; Threlkeld 69' (yellow card) 69'; Purrington (yellow card) 75'; Smith (yellow card) 78'; Tanner 90+5'	Report	Roberts (yellow card) 35'; Yorwerth (yellow card) 48'; Connolly (yellow card) 53'; Young (yellow card) 68'; Collins (yellow card) 72'; Smith (yellow card) 84'	Stadium: Home Park; Attendance: 9,039 (84 away); Referee: Brendan Malone

2 January 2017 24	Barnet	1–0	Plymouth Argyle	Canons Park, London
15:00 GMT	Vilhete 14'	Report	Bradley (yellow card) 55'	Stadium: The Hive Stadium; Attendance: 3,045 (1,119 away); Referee: Nick Kinseley

14 January 2017 25	Plymouth Argyle	4–2	Stevenage	Plymouth
15:00 GMT	Slew 35'; Jervis 42'; Garita 54'; Goodwillie 90+2'	Report	Godden 2'; Schumacher 45+2'; Loft (yellow card) 65'	Stadium: Home Park; Attendance: 8,137 (99 away); Referee: Jack Busby

21 January 2017 26	Cheltenham Town	1–2	Plymouth Argyle	Cheltenham
15:00 GMT	Boyle (yellow card) 67'; Holman 85'; Rowe (yellow card) 88'	Report	Bradley 26', 90+1'; Threlkeld (yellow card) 83'; Tanner (yellow card) 90+5'	Stadium: LCI Rail Stadium; Attendance: 4,729 (1,512); Referee: Ross Joyce

31 January 2017 27	Yeovil Town	2–1	Plymouth Argyle	Yeovil
19:45 GMT	Smith 62'; Lacey 64'; Eaves (yellow card) 83'; Krysiak (yellow card) 90+4'; Dawson (yellow card) 90+6'	Report	Fox (yellow card) 24'; Sokolík 77'; Songo'o (yellow card) 87'	Stadium: Huish Park; Attendance: 4,788 (2,197 away); Referee: Kevin Johnson

4 February 2017 28	Cambridge United	0–1	Plymouth Argyle	Cambridge
15:00 GMT	Legge (yellow card) 90+4'	Report	Sarcevic 41'; Sawyer (yellow card) 81'; McCormick (yellow card) 90+1'	Stadium: Abbey Stadium; Attendance: 5,084 (847 away); Referee: John Brooks

11 February 2017 29	Plymouth Argyle	3–0	Exeter City	Plymouth
15:00 GMT	Kennedy 14'; Taylor 45'; Carey (yellow card) 72'; Jervis 90+3' (pen.)	Report	Woodman (yellow card) 57'; Brown (yellow card) 67'; Pym (yellow card) 90+3'	Stadium: Home Park; Attendance: 14,671 (1,533 away); Referee: Simon Hooper

14 February 2017 30	Plymouth Argyle	2–3	Leyton Orient	Plymouth
19:45 GMT	Sarcevic 10'; Kennedy 54'	Report	Kennedy (yellow card) 37'; Parkes (yellow card) 39'; Hunt (yellow card) 41'; Massey 43', 88'; Semedo (yellow card) 52' (goal) 90+4'; Kelly (yellow card) 70'	Stadium: Home Park; Attendance: 8,054; Referee: Chris Sarginson

18 February 2017 31	Hartlepool United	1–1	Plymouth Argyle	Hartlepool
15:00 GMT	Oates 27'; Harrison (yellow card) 55'	Report	Threlkeld (yellow card) 29'; Taylor (yellow card) 66'; Fox (yellow card) 68'; Kennedy 76'	Stadium: The Northern Gas and Power Stadium; Attendance: 3,684 (944 away); Referee: Andy Haines

25 February 2017 32	Luton Town	1–1	Plymouth Argyle	Luton
15:00 GMT	Hylton 8'; Smith (yellow card) 17'; Cook (yellow card) 43'	Report	Tanner 25'	Stadium: Kenilworth Road; Attendance: 9,124 (1,027 away); Referee: Darren Drysdale

28 February 2017 33	Plymouth Argyle	0–1	Notts County	Plymouth
19:45 GMT	Bradley (yellow card) 67'; Slew (yellow card) 89'	Report	Grant 21'; Forte (yellow card) 32'; O'Connor (yellow card) 68'; Milsom (yellow card) 90+2'	Stadium: Home Park; Attendance: 7,566 (167 away); Referee: Gavin Ward

4 March 2017 34	Plymouth Argyle	2–0	Carlisle United	Plymouth
15:00 GMT	Carey 21'; Jervis (pen.), 45+1'; Spencer (yellow card) 72'	Report	Brisley (yellow card) 41'; Lambe (yellow card) 44'; Proctor (yellow card) 88'	Stadium: Home Park; Attendance: 10,381; Referee: Mark Heywood

7 March 2017 35	Plymouth Argyle	0–3	Blackpool	Plymouth
19:45 GMT	Threlkeld (yellow card) 52'; Spencer (yellow card) 52'	Report	Cullen 27'; Potts 30'; Aldred (yellow card) 32'; Daniel (yellow card) 53'; Flores 62'	Stadium: Home Park; Attendance: 10,568 (167 away); Referee: John Busby

11 March 2017 36	Mansfield Town	0–2	Plymouth Argyle	Mansfield
15:00 GMT	Pearce (yellow card) 67'	Report	Sokolik (yellow card) 37'; Bradley 69'; Carey 74'; Donaldson (yellow card) 80'	Stadium: Field Mill; Attendance: 4,546 (657 away); Referee: Richard Clark

14 March 2017 37	Wycombe Wanderers	1–1	Plymouth Argyle	High Wycombe
19:45 GMT	Weston 18'; O'Nien (yellow card) 66'; Cowan-Hall (yellow card) 78'; Jacobson (yellow card) 85'	Report	Sarcevic (yellow card) 36'; Blissett 72'; Threlkeld (yellow card) 76'	Stadium: Adams Park; Attendance: 3,638; Referee: Charles Breakspear

18 March 2017 38	Plymouth Argyle	1–0	Morecambe	Plymouth
15:00 GMT	Carey 17'; Kennedy (yellow card) 67'	Report	Ellison (yellow card) 88'; Whitmore (yellow card) 90+4'	Stadium: Home Park; Attendance: 8,875 (69 away); Referee: Dean Whitestone

25 March 2017 39	Doncaster Rovers	0–1	Plymouth Argyle	Doncaster
14:45 GMT		Report	Bradley 50'	Stadium: Keepmoat Stadium; Attendance: 7,414 (900 away); Referee: Oliver Langford

1 April 2017 40	Plymouth Argyle	0–1	Accrington Stanley	Plymouth
15:00 GMT	Songo'o (yellow card) 81'	Report	Clark 8'; McCartan (yellow card) 16'; Husin (yellow card) 71'; Donacien (yellow card) 76'	Stadium: Home Park; Attendance: 9,708; Referee: Darren Deadman

8 April 2017 41	Crawley Town	1–2	Plymouth Argyle	Crawley
15:00 BST	Cox 28'; Collins (yellow card) 60' (yellow-red card) 79'; McNerney (yellow card) 67'	Report	Carey 63' (pen.); Taylor 90+4'	Stadium: Broadfield Stadium; Attendance: 3,432 (1,540 away); Referee: Ben Toner

14 April 2017 42	Portsmouth	1–1	Plymouth Argyle	Portsmouth
14:30 BST	Naismith (yellow card) 35'; Roberts 57'	Report	Jervis 12'; Sarcevic (yellow card) 60'; Threlkeld (yellow card) 90+2'	Stadium: Fratton Park; Attendance: 18,625 (2,877 away); Referee: Chris Sarginson

17 April 2017 43	Plymouth Argyle	6–1	Newport County	Plymouth
15:00 GMT	Kennedy 40', 65'; Jervis 42', 73'; Carey 52'; Taylor 58'; Sawyer (yellow card) 81'	Report	Jones (yellow card) 51'; Williams 90+1'	Stadium: Home Park; Attendance: 13,971 (337 away); Referee: Graham Horwood

22 April 2017 44	Colchester United	0–0	Plymouth Argyle	Colchester
15:00 BST	Elokobi (yellow card) 27'; Brindley (yellow card) 81'	Report	Sokolík (yellow card) 56'; Sarcevic (yellow card) 88'	Stadium: Colchester Community Stadium; Attendance: 5,432 (1,120 away); Referee: Darren Handley

29 April 2017 45	Plymouth Argyle	2–1	Crewe Alexandra	Plymouth
15:00 BST	Sarcevic (yellow card) 45'; Taylor 74'; Blissett 79'	Report	Jones 6'; Ng (yellow card) 72'	Stadium: Home Park; Attendance: 13,313 (245 away); Referee: Trevor Kettle

6 May 2017 46	Grimsby Town	1–1	Plymouth Argyle	Cleethorpes
17:30 BST	Pearson 2' (yellow card) 79'; Disley (yellow card) 54'; Jones (yellow card) 75'; Dyson (yellow card) 90+2'	Report	Spencer 61'; Fox (yellow card) 76'	Stadium: Blundell Park; Attendance: 6,866 (2,243 away); Referee: Ross Joyce

== EFL Cup ==
=== Matches ===
9 August 2016 First round	Reading	2–0	Plymouth Argyle	Reading
20:00 BST	van den Berg 16'; Beerens 28'	Report		Stadium: Madejski Stadium; Attendance: 6,979 (1,700 away); Referee: Simon Hooper

== FA Cup ==
5 November 2016 First round	Mansfield Town	1–2	Plymouth Argyle	Mansfield
15:00 GMT	Hemmings 58'	Report	Slew 14'; Fox 80'; Spencer (yellow card) 89'	Stadium: One Call Stadium; Attendance: 2,318 (446 away); Referee: Dean Whitestone

3 December 2016 Second round	Plymouth Argyle	0–0	Newport County	Plymouth
15:00 GMT	Jervis (yellow card) 27'; Tanner (yellow card) 79'	Report	Barnum-Bobb (yellow card) 3'; Rigg (red card) 23'; Butler (yellow card) 34'; Bennett (yellow card) 73'	Stadium: Home Park; Attendance: 5,071 (203 away); Referee: John Brooks

20 December 2016 Replay	Newport County	0–1 (a.e.t.)	Plymouth Argyle	Newport
19:45 GMT	Jones (yellow card) 57'	Report	Bradley (yellow card) 49'; Carey 113' (pen.)	Stadium: Rodney Parade; Attendance: 5,121 (946 away); Referee: Dean Whitestone

8 January 2017 Third round	Liverpool	0–0	Plymouth Argyle	Liverpool
13:30 GMT		Report		Stadium: Anfield; Attendance: 52,692 (8,600 away); Referee: Paul Tierney

18 January 2017 Replay	Plymouth Argyle	0–1	Liverpool	Plymouth
19:45 GMT	Songo'o (yellow card) 86'	Report	Lucas 18'; Gomez (yellow card) 25'; Ejaria (yellow card) 51'; Ojo (yellow card) 84'; Origi (penalty missed) 87'	Stadium: Home Park; Attendance: 17,048; Referee: Graham Scott

== EFL Trophy ==
Pos	Div	Team	Pld	W	PW	PL	L	GF	GA	GD	Pts	Qualification
1	L1	AFC Wimbledon	3	2	0	0	1	5	3	+2	6	Advance to Round 2
2	ACA	Swansea City U21	3	2	0	0	1	4	4	0	6	Advance to Round 2
3	L2	Plymouth Argyle	3	1	0	0	2	5	5	0	3	
4	L2	Newport County	3	1	0	0	2	4	6	−2	3	

Source: Sky Sports

30 August 2016 Group stage 1	Plymouth Argyle	4–1	Newport County	Plymouth
19:45 BST	Slew 51'; Jervis 58'; Bulvitis 69'; Tanner 90'	Report	Green 19'	Stadium: Home Park; Attendance: 2,349 (89 away); Referee: Phil Gibbs

4 October 2016 Group stage 2	AFC Wimbledon	2–1	Plymouth Argyle	Kingsmeadow
19:45 BST	Taylor (yellow card) 28' (goal) 65'; Barnett 68' (yellow card) 89'; Beere (yellow card) 71'	Report	Smith 7'; Miller (yellow card) 64'	Attendance: 936 (297 away); Referee: Graham Horwood

8 November 2016 Group stage 3	Swansea City U23	2–0	Plymouth Argyle	Swansea
19:45 GMT	James 13'; McBurnie 20'	Report	Bentley (red card) 45+1'	Stadium: Liberty Stadium; Referee: Brendan Malone

== Statistics ==
As of 18 April 2017

No.	Pos	Nat	Player	Total		League Two		FA Cup		League Cup		League Trophy	
No.	Pos	Nat	Player	Apps	Goals	Apps	Goals	Apps	Goals	Apps	Goals	Apps	Goals
2	DF	(Scotland) SCO	Gary Miller	48	0	37+4	0	4+0	0	1+0	0	2+0	0
3	DF	(England) ENG	Gary Sawyer	21	0	20+0	0	0+0	0	1+0	0	0+0	0
4	DF	(Cameroon) CMR	Yann Songo'o	63	1	51+5	1	5+0	0	1+0	0	1+0	0
5	DF	(Latvia) LAT	Nauris Bulvītis	31	3	23+3	2	1+1	0	0+0	0	3+0	1
6	MF	(Republic of Ireland) IRL	Connor Smith	50	2	30+14	1	2+1	0	0+1	0	2+0	1
7	MF	(England) ENG	Antoni Sarcevic	17	2	16+1	2	0+0	0	0+0	0	0+0	0
8	FW	(England) ENG	Jordan Slew	58	5	38+12	3	4+0	1	1+0	0	3+0	1
9	FW	(England) ENG	Jimmy Spencer	39	2	27+9	2	1+0	0	0+1	0	0+1	0
10	MF	(Republic of Ireland) IRL	Graham Carey	61	16	52+1	15	5+0	1	1+0	0	1+1	0
11	FW	(England) ENG	Ryan Donaldson	57	1	33+17	1	1+2	0	0+1	0	1+2	0
13	FW	(England) ENG	Nathan Blissett	13	1	7+6	1	0+0	0	0+0	0	0+0	0
14	FW	(England) ENG	Jake Jervis	68	13	48+14	12	4+0	0	1+0	0	1+0	1
15	DF	(England) ENG	Sonny Bradley	61	7	51+1	7	5+0	0	1+0	0	3+0	0
16	MF	(Scotland) SCO	Matty Kennedy	15	5	15+0	5	0+0	0	0+0	0	0+0	0
18	MF	(England) ENG	Oscar Threlkeld	51	1	42+3	1	4+0	0	1+0	0	1+0	0
19	FW	(England) ENG	Ryan Taylor	19	3	16+3	3	0+0	0	0+0	0	0+0	0
21	GK	(France) FRA	Vincent Dorel	8	0	4+0	0	0+0	0	1+0	0	3+0	0
22	MF	(England) ENG	David Ijaha	10	0	4+2	0	0+1	0	0+0	0	2+1	0
23	GK	(England) ENG	Luke McCormick	55	0	50+0	0	5+0	0	0+0	0	0+0	0
24	MF	(England) ENG	David Fox	55	1	45+3	0	5+0	1	1+0	0	1+0	0
25	GK	(Scotland) SCO	Marc McCallum	6	0	2+2	0	0+0	0	0+0	0	0+2	0
26	FW	(Cameroon) CMR	Paul Garita	27	2	17+7	2	2+1	0	0+0	0	0+0	0
27	FW	(England) ENG	Craig Tanner	60	6	34+18	5	3+2	0	0+0	0	2+1	1
28	DF	(England) ENG	Jordan Bentley	1	0	0+0	0	0+0	0	0+0	0	1+0	0
30	FW	(England) ENG	Alex Fletcher	1	0	0+0	0	0+1	0	0+0	0	0+0	0
31	DF	(Czech Republic) CZE	Jakub Sokolík	21	0	18+3	0	0+0	0	0+0	0	0+0	0
First team players out on loan:
20	FW	(Northern Ireland) NIR	Louis Rooney	3	0	0+1	0	0+2	0	0+0	0	0+0	0
First team player(s) that left the club:
7	FW	(Scotland) SCO	David Goodwillie	22	1	5+11	1	1+1	0	1+0	0	3+0	0
16	DF	(England) ENG	Ben Purrington	25	0	16+3	0	3+0	0	0+0	0	3+0	0
19	DF	(England) ENG	Karleigh Osborne	2	0	0+1	0	0+0	0	0+0	0	0+1	0

=== Goals record ===
As of 4 April 2017

Rank	No.	Nat.	Po.	Name	League Two	FA Cup	League Cup	League Trophy	Total
1	10	(Republic of Ireland)	AM	Graham Carey	15	1	0	0	16
2	14	(England)	CF	Jake Jervis	12	0	0	1	13
3	15	(England)	CB	Sonny Bradley	7	0	0	0	7
4	8	(England)	CF	Jordan Slew	4	1	0	1	6
4	27	(England)	SS	Craig Tanner	5	0	0	1	6
6	16	(Scotland)	RM	Matty Kennedy	5	0	0	0	5
7	5	(Latvia)	CB	Nauris Bulvītis	2	0	0	1	3
7	19	(England)	CF	Ryan Taylor	3	0	0	0	3
10	4	(Cameroon)	CB	Yann Songo'o	2	0	0	0	2
10	6	(Republic of Ireland)	CM	Connor Smith	1	0	0	1	2
10	7	(England)	CM	Antoni Sarcevic	2	0	0	0	2
10	9	(England)	CF	Jimmy Spencer	2	0	0	0	2
10	11	(England)	CF	Ryan Donaldson	2	0	0	0	2
10	18	(England)	DM	Oscar Threlkeld	2	0	0	0	2
10	~~26~~	(Cameroon)	CF	Paul Garita	2	0	0	0	2
17	~~7~~	(Scotland)	CF	David Goodwillie	1	0	0	0	1
17	13	(England)	CF	Nathan Blissett	1	0	0	0	1
17	24	(England)	CM	David Fox	0	1	0	0	1
17	31	(Czech Republic)	CB	Jakub Sokolík	1	0	0	0	1
Total					66	3	0	5	74

=== Disciplinary record ===
As of 18 April 2017

Rank	No.	Nat.	Po.	Name	League Two			FA Cup			League Cup			League Trophy			Total		
Rank	No.	Nat.	Po.	Name	Yellow card	(yellow card) (yellow-red card)	Red card	Yellow card	(yellow card) (yellow-red card)	Red card	Yellow card	(yellow card) (yellow-red card)	Red card	Yellow card	(yellow card) (yellow-red card)	Red card	Yellow card	(yellow card) (yellow-red card)	Red card
1	4	CB	(Cameroon)	Yann Songo'o	7	0	0	1	0	0	0	0	0	0	0	0	8	0	0
1	18	DM	(England)	Oscar Threlkeld	8	0	0	0	0	0	0	0	0	0	0	0	8	0	0
3	9	CF	(England)	Jimmy Spencer	5	0	0	1	0	0	0	0	0	0	0	0	6	0	0
4	2	RB	(Scotland)	Gary Miller	4	0	0	0	0	0	0	0	0	1	0	0	5	0	0
4	6	CM	(Republic of Ireland)	Connor Smith	5	0	0	0	0	0	0	0	0	0	0	0	5	0	0
4	15	CB	(England)	Sonny Bradley	4	0	0	1	0	0	0	0	0	0	0	0	5	0	0
4	~~16~~	LB	(England)	Ben Purrington	4	0	0	1	0	0	0	0	0	0	0	0	5	0	0
8	8	CF	(England)	Jordan Slew	3	1	0	0	0	0	0	0	0	0	0	0	3	1	0
8	11	CM	(England)	Ryan Donaldson	4	0	0	0	0	0	0	0	0	0	0	0	4	0	0
8	27	SS	(England)	Craig Tanner	3	0	0	1	0	0	0	0	0	0	0	0	4	0	0
11	3	LB	(England)	Gary Sawyer	3	0	0	0	0	0	0	0	0	0	0	0	3	0	0
11	5	CB	(Latvia)	Nauris Bulvītis	3	0	0	0	0	0	0	0	0	0	0	0	3	0	0
11	10	AM	(Republic of Ireland)	Graham Carey	3	0	0	0	0	0	0	0	0	0	0	0	3	0	0
11	24	CM	(England)	David Fox	3	0	0	0	0	0	0	0	0	0	0	0	3	0	0
15	7	CM	(England)	Antoni Sarcevic	2	0	0	0	0	0	0	0	0	0	0	0	2	0	0
15	14	CF	(England)	Jake Jervis	1	0	0	1	0	0	0	0	0	0	0	0	2	0	0
15	16	RM	(Scotland)	Matty Kennedy	2	0	0	0	0	0	0	0	0	0	0	0	2	0	0
15	23	GK	(England)	Luke McCormick	2	0	0	0	0	0	0	0	0	0	0	0	2	0	0
15	26	CF	(Cameroon)	Paul Garita	2	0	0	0	0	0	0	0	0	0	0	0	2	0	0
20	19	CF	(England)	Ryan Taylor	1	0	0	0	0	0	0	0	0	0	0	0	1	0	0
20	28	RB	(England)	Jordan Bentley	0	0	0	0	0	0	0	0	0	0	1	0	0	1	0
20	31	CB	(Czech Republic)	Jakub Sokolík	1	0	0	0	0	0	0	0	0	0	0	0	1	0	0
Total					70	1	0	7	0	0	0	0	0	2	0	0	79	1	0

== Transfers ==
=== Transfers in ===
Date from	Position	Nationality	Name	From	Fee	Ref.
1 July 2016	CB	(Latvia)	Nauris Bulvītis	Spartaks Jūrmala	Free transfer	
1 July 2016	CF	(England)	Ryan Donaldson	Cambridge United	Free transfer	
1 July 2016	CF	(Scotland)	David Goodwillie	Aberdeen	Free transfer	
1 July 2016	RB	(Scotland)	Gary Miller	Partick Thistle	Free transfer	
1 July 2016	CB	(England)	Karleigh Osborne	Bristol City	Free transfer	
1 July 2016	CF	(England)	Jordan Slew	Chesterfield	Free transfer	
1 July 2016	CM	(Republic of Ireland)	Connor Smith	AFC Wimbledon	Undisclosed	
1 July 2016	CB	(Cameroon)	Yann Songo'o	Free agent	Free transfer	
1 July 2016	CF	(England)	Jimmy Spencer	Cambridge United	Free transfer	
2 July 2016	DM	(England)	Oscar Threlkeld	Bolton Wanderers	Free transfer	
11 July 2016	CB	(England)	Sonny Bradley	Crawley Town	Free transfer	
18 July 2016	CM	(England)	David Ijaha	Whitehawk	Free transfer	
22 July 2016	CM	(England)	David Fox	Crewe Alexandra	Free transfer	
1 August 2016	GK	(Scotland)	Marc McCallum	Livingston	Free transfer	
4 January 2017	CB	(Czech Republic)	Jakub Sokolík	Southend United	Free transfer	
5 January 2017	CF	(England)	Nathan Blissett	Torquay United	£15,000	
26 January 2017	CM	(England)	Antoni Sarcevic	Shrewsbury Town	Free transfer	
30 January 2017	CF	(England)	Ryan Taylor	Oxford United	Free transfer	

=== Transfers out ===
Date from	Position	Nationality	Name	To	Fee	Ref.
1 July 2016	GK	(England)	James Bittner	Newport County	Free transfer	
1 July 2016	LW	(England)	Callum Hall	Free agent	Released	
1 July 2016	CB	(England)	Peter Hartley	Bristol Rovers	Free transfer	
1 July 2016	GK	(England)	Corey Harvey	Free agent	Released	
1 July 2016	CM	(England)	Josh Simpson	Free agent	Released	
1 July 2016	CF	(England)	Deane Smalley	Free agent	Released	
1 July 2016	LW	(Scotland)	Gregg Wylde	Millwall	Free transfer	
4 July 2016	AM	(England)	Tyler Harvey	Wrexham (Note: Following Harvey's departure, he signed for Wrexham.)	Rejected contract	
4 July 2016	RB	(England)	Kelvin Mellor	Blackpool (Note: Following Mellor's departure, he signed for Blackpool.)	Rejected contract	
4 July 2016	CB	(England)	Curtis Nelson	Oxford United (Note: Following Nelson's departure, he signed for Oxford United.)	£250,000	
4 July 2016	CF	(England)	Reuben Reid	Exeter City (Note: Following Reid's departure, he signed for Exeter City.)	Rejected contract	
5 July 2016	CB	(Republic of Ireland)	Carl McHugh	Motherwell	Free transfer	
16 January 2017	CB	(England)	Karleigh Osborne	Kilmarnock	Free transfer	
25 January 2017	CF	(Scotland)	David Goodwillie	Free agent	Mutual Consent	
30 January 2017	LB	(England)	Ben Purrington	Rotherham United	Undisclosed	

=== Loans in ===
Date from	Position	Nationality	Name	From	Date until	Ref.
18 August 2016	SS	(England)	Craig Tanner	Reading	31 May 2017	
31 August 2016	CF	(Cameroon)	Arnold Garita	Bristol City	31 May 2017	
31 January 2017	RM	(Scotland)	Matty Kennedy	Cardiff City	31 May 2017	

=== Loans out ===
Date from	Position	Nationality	Name	To	Date until	Ref.
31 January 2017	FW	(Northern Ireland)	Louis Rooney	Hartlepool United	31 May 2017	
