= David Ijaha =

English footballer (born 1990)

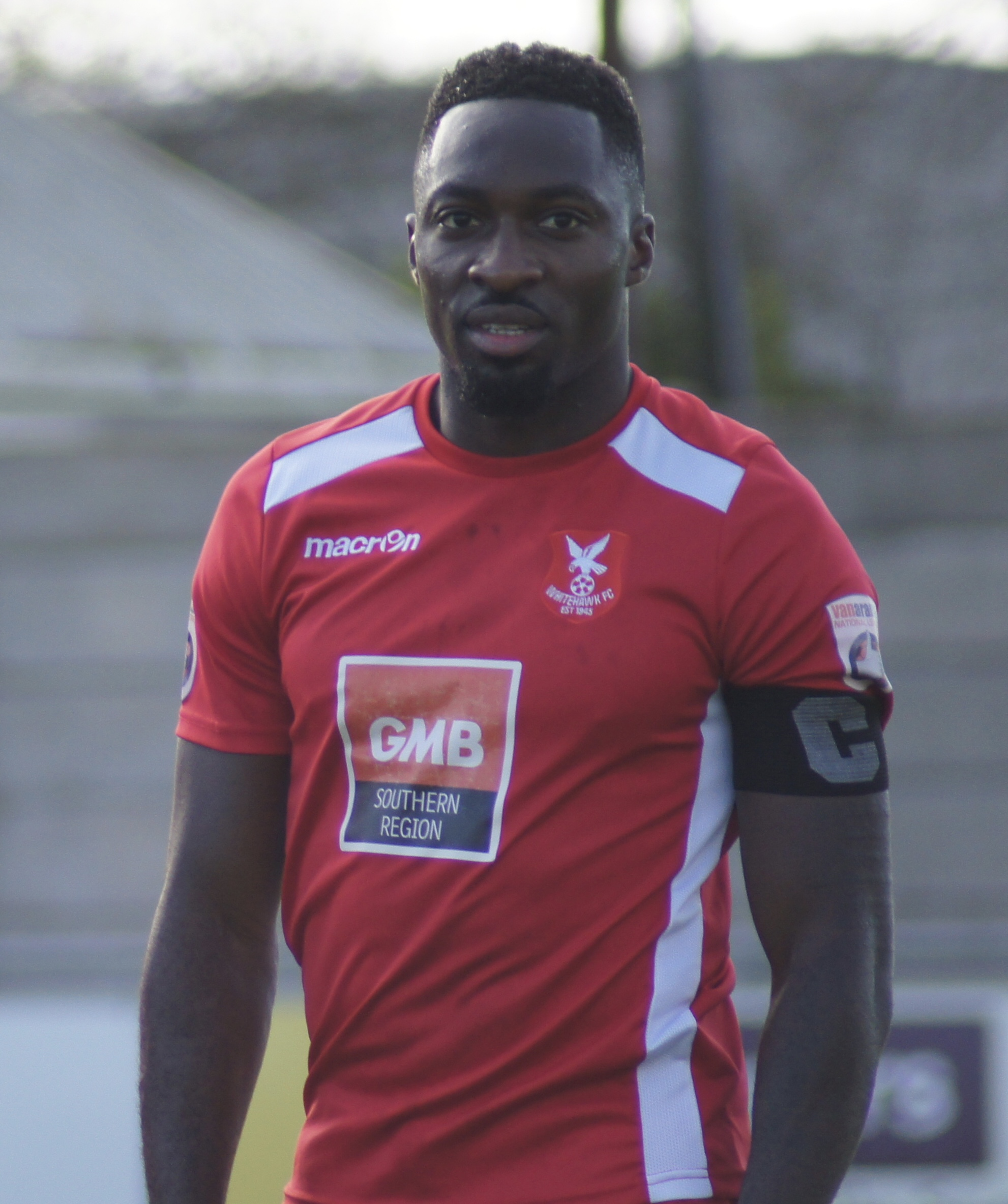
- Ijaha captaining Whitehawk in 2017

Personal information
- Date of birth: 20 February 1990 (age 36)
- Place of birth: London, England
- Position: Midfielder

Team information
- Current team: Rayners Lane

Youth career
- 2002–2005: Chelsea
- 2006–2008: Wolverhampton Wanderers

Senior career*
Years	Team	Apps	(Gls)
2010–2011	Harrow Borough	39	(2)
2011–2012	St Albans City	62	(3)
2012–2014	Tonbridge Angels	55	(4)
2014	Hayes & Yeading United	7	(0)
2014–2016	Whitehawk	62	(2)
2016–2017	Plymouth Argyle	3	(0)
2017	Wealdstone	3	(0)
2017–2018	Whitehawk	31	(2)
2018–2019	Welling United	35	(3)
2019–2020	Dulwich Hamlet	26	(3)
2020–2021	Dartford	10	(0)
2022	Dartford	0	(0)
2022	→ Whitehawk (loan)	4	(0)
2022–2024	Cray Wanderers	79	(1)
2025–	Rayners Lane	1	(0)
- * Club domestic league appearances and goals as of 09:20, 11 February 2025 (UTC)

David Ijaha (born 17 February 1990) is an English footballer who plays as a midfielder or defender for Combined Counties League Premier Division North club Rayners Lane.

== Career ==
=== Early career ===
Ijaha was at his local Chelsea academy for three years as a youngster, being released at the age of 15. Having earned a place at an England Schoolboy training camp he met up with Kyle Bennett who introduced him to Wolverhampton Wanderers, where he spent two seasons playing for the U18 side and the reserves, before being released.

=== Non-League career ===
After a spell out of the game, Ijaha joined Harrow Borough in August 2010 and then followed his manager David Howell to Southern Premier Division club St Albans City, where he was made captain. He signed for National League South side Tonbridge Angels in December 2013. Following Tonbridge's relegation, Ijaha joined Hayes & Yeading United at the start of the 2014–2015 season, where he had been a long term target of manager Phil Babb. However, he soon moved to National League South rivals Whitehawk where he spent two seasons.

=== Plymouth Argyle ===
At the start of the 2016–17 season, Ijaha was invited down to Home Park for a trial by Plymouth Argyle's assistant manager Craig Brewster, who had previously coached in Sussex at Whitehawk. Ijaha impressed enough to be offered a contract and he made his Football League debut at the age of 27, playing for Plymouth Argyle in a 3–0 loss against Luton Town on 6 August 2016. After struggling with a long-term injury, Ijaha was released at the end of the 2016–17 season having made three league appearances.

=== Later career ===
Ijaha had a short spell with National League South club Wealdstone at the beginning of the 2017–18 season, before rejoining Whitehawk and being appointed captain in September.

After a season at Welling United in 2018–19 and another season at Dulwich Hamlet in 2019–20, Ijaha joined league rivals Dartford for the 2020–21 season. He re-joined Dartford towards the end of the 2021–22 season before going out on loan to former-side Whitehawk.

On September 16, 2022, Ijaha signed for Cray Wanderers. He departed the club in November 2024.

In February 2025, Ijaha joined Isthmian League South Central Division side Rayners Lane.

== Personal life ==
Ijaha was educated at St Thomas More School in Chelsea.

== Career statistics ==
As of match played 16 November 2024

Appearances and goals by club, season and competition
Club	Season	League			FA Cup		League Cup		Other		Total	
Club	Season	Division	Apps	Goals	Apps	Goals	Apps	Goals	Apps	Goals	Apps	Goals
Harrow Borough	2010–11	Isthmian Premier	39	2	2	0	—	—	6	0	47	2
Harrow Borough	Harrow Borough total		39	2	2	0	0	0	6	0	47	2
St Albans City	2011–12	SFL - Premier Division	40	2	4	0	—	—	2 (Note: One appearance in the FA Trophy and one in the Southern League Cup)	0	46	2
St Albans City	2012–13	SFL - Premier Division	22	1	3	0	—	—	4 (Note: One appearance in the Herts Charity Cup, one in the FA Trophy, one in the Southern League Cup and one in the Herts Senior Cup)	0	29	1
St Albans City	St Albans City total		62	3	7	0	0	0	6	0	75	3
Tonbridge Angels	2012–13	Conference South	21	3	—	—	—	—	0	0	21	3
Tonbridge Angels	2013–14	Conference South	34	1	0	0	—	—	2 (Note: Appearances in the FA Trophy)	0	36	1
Tonbridge Angels	Tonbridge total		55	4	0	0	0	0	2	0	57	4
Hayes & Yeading United	2014–15	Conference South	7	0	0	0	—	—	0	0	7	0
Hayes & Yeading United	Hayes & Yeading United total		7	0	0	0	0	0	0	0	7	0
Whitehawk	2014–15	Conference South	30	0	3	0	—	—	6 (Note: Appearances in the FA Trophy and Sussex Senior Cup)	0	39	0
Whitehawk	2015–16	National League South	36	2	5	0	—	—	1	0	42	2
Whitehawk	Whitehawk total		66	2	8	0	0	0	7	0	81	2
Plymouth Argyle	2016–17	League Two	3	0	1	0	0	0	3 (Note: Appearances in the EFL Trophy)	0	7	0
Wealdstone	2017–18	National League South	3	0	0	0	—	—	0	0	3	0
Whitehawk	2017–18	National League South	31	2	0	0	—	—	6	0	37	2
Welling United	2018–19	National League South	35	3	1	0	—	—	0	0	36	3
Dulwich Hamlet	2019–20	National League South	26	3	0	0	—	—	1	0	27	3
Dartford	2020–21	National League South	10	0	0	0	—	—	1	0	11	0
Dartford	2021–22	National League South	0	0	0	0	—	—	1 (Note: Appearance in the Kent Senior Cup)	0	1	0
Dartford	Dartford total		10	0	0	0	0	0	2	0	12	0
Whitehawk (loan)	2021–22	Isthmian League South East Division	4	0	—	—	—	—	—	—	4	0
Cray Wanderers	2022–23	Isthmian League Premier Division	28	0	0	0	—	—	2 (Note: Appearance in the Isthmian League Premier Division Play-Offs)	1	30	1
Cray Wanderers	2023–24	Isthmian League Premier Division	38	1	3	1	—	—	3	0	44	1
Cray Wanderers	2024–25	Isthmian League Premier Division	13	0	4	1	—		2 (Note: One appearance in FA Trophy, one appearance in Kent Senior Cup)	0	19	1
Cray Wanderers	Cray Wanderers total		79	1	7	2	0	0	7	1	93	3
Career total			420	20	26	2	0	0	40	1	486	22
