= 2014 Baltic Cup =

Sport season of a football competition

Tournament details
- Host country: Latvia
- Dates: 29–31 May
- Teams: 4
- Venue: 2 (in 2 host cities)

Final positions
- Champions: Latvia (11th title)
- Runners-up: Lithuania
- Third place: Finland
- Fourth place: Estonia

Tournament statistics
- Matches played: 4
- Goals scored: 4 (1 per match)
- Top scorer(s): (Finland) Përparim Hetemaj (Finland) Valtteri Moren (Latvia) Nauris Bulvītis (Lithuania) Arvydas Novikovas (1 goal each)

The 2014 Baltic Cup was a football competition, held between 29 and 31 May 2014, hosted by Latvia.

== Format ==
For the second time in a row Finland joined Estonia, Latvia and Lithuania, thus the knock-out tournament format established in the previous edition was maintained. Penalty shoot-outs were used to decide the winner if a match was drawn after 90 minutes.

== Results ==
Semi-finals
29 May
Latvia (p)	0 (4)
Estonia	0 (2)
29 May
Lithuania	1
Finland	0

Final
31 May
Latvia	1
Lithuania	0
Third place
31 May
Finland	2
Estonia	0

== Matches ==
=== Semi-finals ===
29 May 2014
17:00 UTC+3

Lithuania	1–0	Finland
Novikovas 42'	Report

Olimpiskais Stadions, Ventspils
Attendance: 631
Referee: Vadims Direktorenko (Latvia)

29 May 2014
20:15 UTC+3

Latvia	0–0	Estonia
	Report
Penalties
Zjuzins (penalty scored); Laizāns (penalty scored); Fertovs (penalty scored); Višņakovs (penalty scored)	4–2	(penalty scored) Vassiljev; (penalty missed) Vunk; (penalty scored) Kallaste; (penalty missed) Mets

Daugava Stadium, Liepāja
Attendance: 2,115
Referee: Sergejus Slyva (Lithuania)
- Note: This was the farewell match for Latvia's forward Māris Verpakovskis.

=== Third place match ===
31 May 2014
14:00 UTC+3

Finland	2–0	Estonia
Hetemaj 49'; Moren 88'	Report

Olimpiskais Stadions, Ventspils
Referee: Aleksandrs Anufrievs (Latvia)

=== Final ===
31 May 2014
20:00 UTC+3

Latvia	1–0	Lithuania
Bulvitis 6'	Report

Daugava Stadium, Liepāja
Referee: Kristo Tohver (Estonia)

== Winners ==
2014 Baltic Football Cup winners

Latvia
Eleventh title

== Statistics ==
=== Goalscorers ===
There were 4 goals scored in 4 matches, for an average of 1 goal per match.

1 goal

- (Finland) Përparim Hetemaj
- (Finland) Valtteri Moren
- (Latvia) Nauris Bulvītis
- (Lithuania) Arvydas Novikovas
