= Yann Songo'o =

Cameroonia-French footballer (born 1991)

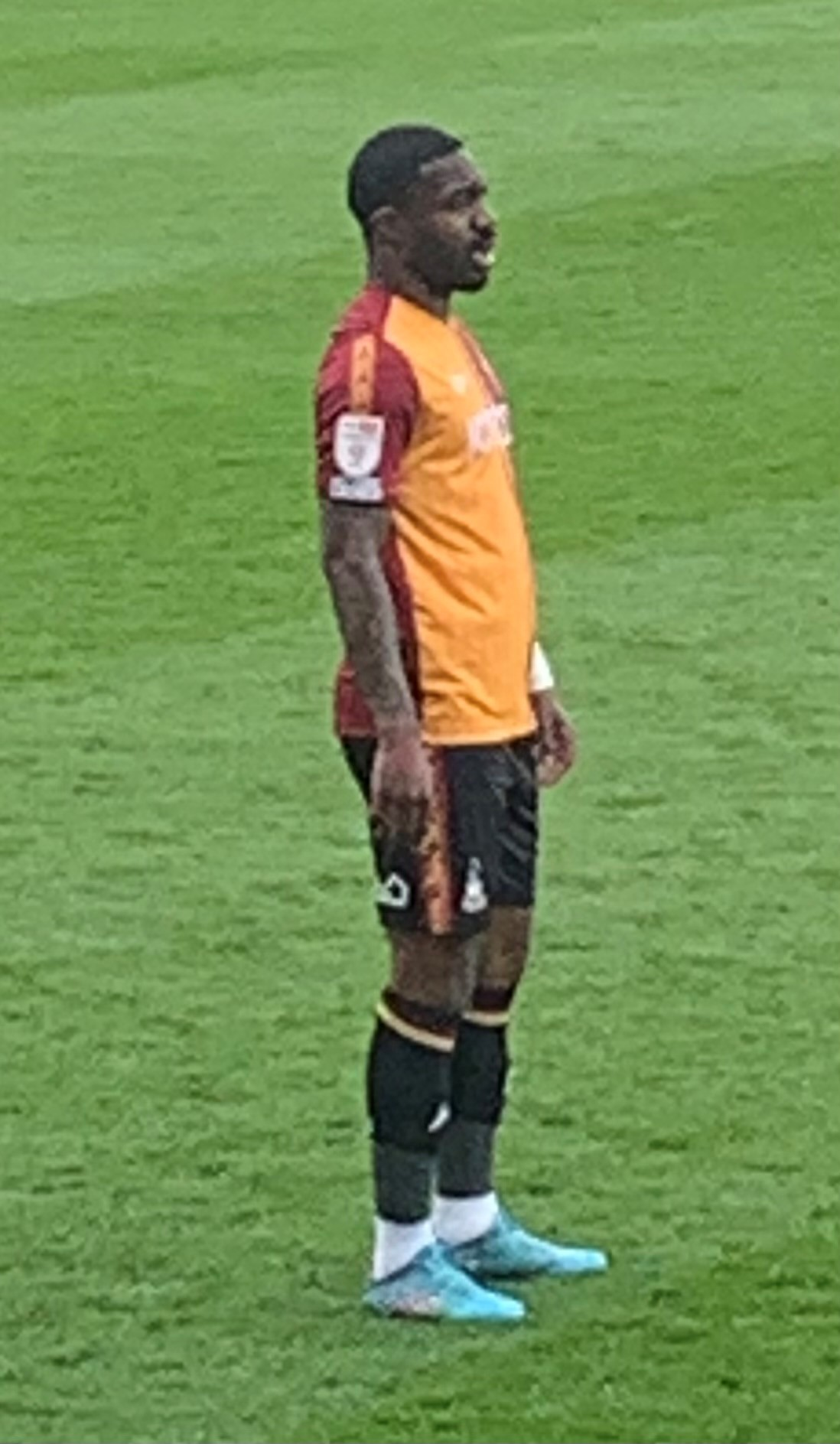
- Songo'o at Bradford City A.F.C. in 2022.

Personal information
- Full name: Yann Songo'o
- Date of birth: 19 November 1991 (age 34)
- Place of birth: Toulon, France
- Height: 1.86 m (6 ft 1 in)
- Positions: Defender; defensive midfielder

Team information
- Current team: Hyde United

Youth career
- 2000–2008: Deportivo La Coruña
- 2008–2009: Metz
- 2009–2010: Zaragoza

Senior career*
Years	Team	Apps	(Gls)
2010–2011	Zaragoza B	5	(0)
2011–2012	Sabadell	6	(0)
2012	Pobla Mafumet	10	(3)
2013	Sporting Kansas City	0	(0)
2013	→ Orlando City (loan)	12	(1)
2013–2015	Blackburn Rovers	0	(0)
2014	→ Ross County (loan)	17	(3)
2016–2019	Plymouth Argyle	121	(2)
2019–2020	Scunthorpe United	16	(0)
2020–2021	Morecambe	41	(6)
2021–2023	Bradford City	55	(3)
2023	→ Walsall (loan)	5	(0)
2023–2026	Morecambe	111	(3)
2026–	Hyde United	0	(0)

International career
- France U16
2011	Cameroon U20	3	(0)
- * Club domestic league appearances and goals as of 18:14, 29 July 2026 (UTC)

Yann Songo'o (born 19 November 1991) is a professional footballer who plays as a defender for Northern Premier League Premier Division club Hyde United. Born in France, he has represented Cameroon at youth level.

== Club career ==
=== Early years ===
Songo'o began his career in Spain, playing in Deportivo's youth categories. He then had a short period in the French club FC Metz, and in 2009 he was moved to Spain, playing for Real Zaragoza's youth ranks. After one season with Zaragoza B, he was moved to freshly-promoted CE Sabadell FC.

On 31 January 2012, Songo'o rescinded his contract with Sabadell, and in the same day he signed a contract with CF Pobla de Mafumet.

=== United States ===
On 13 December 2012, Songo'o signed with Major League Soccer club Sporting Kansas City. He was loaned to third-division Orlando City for the 2013 season.

Songo'o scored one goal in twelve appearances with Orlando City before mutually agreeing to terminate his contract with Sporting Kansas City in June 2013, effectively ending his loan as well.

=== Blackburn Rovers ===
In July 2013, Songo'o featured in a pre-season friendly for the English Championship side Blackburn Rovers F.C., as part of a trial period with the club, he featured in two pre-season friendlies. On 5 August 2013, Songo'o signed a two-year deal with the club on a free transfer. He made his senior debut for the club on 7 August 2013 in a Football League Cup match against Carlisle United. Songo'o started the match and played the full 90 minutes of the 3–4 defeat in extra time.

==== Ross County (loan) ====
On 18 January 2014, Songo'o signed for Ross County of the Scottish Premiership on loan until the end of the 2013–14 season on 30 June 2014. He was then placed directly into the starting line-up for Ross County's match against Dundee United. Songo'o made his debut for the club in the starting XI for that match the same day that the signing was confirmed. During Ross County's next match only seven days later, Songo'o scored his first goal for the club during a 1–2 defeat to Hearts on 25 January 2014.

=== Plymouth Argyle ===
Songo'o joined EFL League Two side Plymouth Argyle on 19 June 2016, reuniting with Derek Adams who was his manager at Ross County. He scored his first goal for the club on 15 October 2016 in a 2–2 draw at home to Portsmouth. His second goal for the club came in a 3–3 draw with Wycombe Wanderers at home on 26 December 2016. Argyle won promotion to the EFL League One that season.

He signed a new contract with Argyle at the end of the 2017–18 season. He was offered a new contract by Plymouth Argyle at the end of the 2018–19 season but instead decided to join newly relegated League Two side Scunthorpe United on a one-year deal.

=== Morecambe ===
On 23 September 2020, Songo'o joined EFL League Two side Morecambe. On 18 March 2021, he was handed a six-game ban and ordered to complete face-to-face education after admitting a charge of directing a homophobic insult at an opposing player.

=== Bradford City ===
He moved to Bradford City at the start of the 2021–22 season.

In January 2023 he moved on loan to Walsall.

In May 2023 it was announced that he would leave Bradford City when his contract expired on 30 June.

=== Return to Morecambe ===
On 27 June 2023, Songo'o was announced to be returning to Morecambe on a one-year deal. On 16 May 2026, Morecambe announced he was being released.

=== Hyde United ===
On 28 July 2026, Songo'o joined Northern Premier League Premier Division club Hyde United.

== Personal life ==
The Songo'o family has raised many footballers. Yann is the son of former Cameroonian national team goalkeeper Jacques Songo'o, who featured for Spanish side Deportivo La Coruña in the late 1990s and early 2000s. His brother is a professional footballer Franck Songo'o.

== Career statistics ==
As of end of 2025–26 season

Appearances and goals by club, season and competition
Club	Season	League			National cup (Note: Includes Copa del Rey, U.S. Open Cup, FA Cup)		League cup (Note: Includes EFL Cup)		Other		Total	
Club	Season	Division	Apps	Goals	Apps	Goals	Apps	Goals	Apps	Goals	Apps	Goals
Sabadell	2011–12	Segunda División	6	0	1	0	–		–		7	0
Sporting Kansas City	2013	MLS	0	0	0	0	–		–		0	0
Orlando City (loan)	2013	USL Pro	12	1	2	0	–		–		14	1
Blackburn Rovers	2013–14	Championship	0	0	0	0	1	0	–		1	0
Blackburn Rovers	2014–15	Championship	0	0	0	0	1	0	–		1	0
Blackburn Rovers	Total		0	0	0	0	2	0	0	0	2	0
Ross County (loan)	2013–14	Scottish Premiership	17	3	0	0	0	0	–		17	3
Plymouth Argyle	2016–17	League Two	46	2	5	0	1	0	1 (Note: Appearance(s) in EFL Trophy)	0	53	2
Plymouth Argyle	2017–18	League One	33	0	2	0	1	0	3	0	39	0
Plymouth Argyle	2018–19	League One	42	0	2	0	2	1	1	0	47	1
Plymouth Argyle	Total		121	2	9	0	4	1	5	0	139	3
Scunthorpe United	2019–20	League Two	16	0	1	0	1	0	1	0	19	0
Morecambe	2020–21	League Two	41	6	3	0	0	0	1	0	45	6
Bradford City	2021–22	League Two	41	3	2	0	0	0	1	0	44	3
Bradford City	2022–23	League Two	14	0	0	0	1	0	4	0	19	0
Bradford City	Total		55	3	2	0	1	0	5	0	63	3
Walsall	2022–23	League Two	5	0	1	0	–		–		6	0
Morecambe	2023–24	League Two	40	0	3	0	1	0	2	0	46	0
Morecambe	2024–25	League Two	36	3	2	0	1	0	2	0	41	3
Morecambe	2025–26	National League	35	0	2	0	—		1 (Note: Appearance(s) in FA Trophy)	0	38	0
Morecambe	Morecambe total		152	9	10	0	2	0	6	0	170	9
Career total			384	18	26	0	10	1	17	0	437	19

== Honours ==
Morecambe

- EFL League Two play-offs: 2021
