= Vincent Dorel =

French professional footballer (born 1992)

Personal information
- Full name: Vincent Dorel
- Date of birth: 21 March 1992 (age 34)
- Place of birth: Rennes, France
- Height: 1.90 m (6 ft 3 in)
- Position: Goalkeeper

Senior career*
| Years | Team | Apps | (Gls) |
| 2010–2012 | Stade Rennais B | 17 | (0) |
| 2012–2013 | Les Herbiers | 2 | (0) |
| 2013–2014 | GSI Pontivy | 30 | (0) |
| 2014–2016 | Le Poiré-sur-Vie | 7 | (0) |
| 2014–2016 | Le Poiré-sur-Vie B | 3 | (0) |
| 2016–2017 | Plymouth Argyle | 1 | (0) |
| 2017–2018 | Torquay United | 35 | (0) |
| 2018 | Farul Constanța | 2 | (0) |
- * Club domestic league appearances and goals as of 10:46, 2 October 2018 (UTC)

Vincent Dorel (born 21 March 1992) is a French former professional footballer who played as a goalkeeper.

== Career ==
Dorel began his career with Stade Rennais in 2002. He went through all categories from youth academy to First Team. Following ten years at Stade Rennais, Dorel was released by the club in summer 2012.

After leaving Stade Rennais he signed at Les Herbiers in July 2012.

In summer 2013 Dorel signed a one-year contract at GSI Pontivy as a first choice. Dorel made his club debut on 17 August 2013 against Villenave. Gsi Pontivy won the match 3–0 win giving the goalkeeper his first clean sheet with the club. He was named in the Team of year decided by all managers of the league. He earned Best goalkeeper of the league award this season.

Dorel signed at Le Poiré-sur-Vie in National (the third level of French football). Dorel started his first National game against Epinal on 8 August 2014, keeping a clean sheet in a 2–0 away victory. Despite their 12th Position on the table Le Poiré-sur-Vie were relegated to the equivalent of the English National League because of financial sanctions.

He joined English League Two club Plymouth Argyle in March 2016. He made his professional debut on 7 May 2016 in a 5–0 win over Hartlepool United.

On 10 May 2017, Dorel was one of nine players released by Plymouth Argyle following the end of the 2016–17 season.

On 1 September 2017 Dorel signed for Torquay United on a non contract basis. He made his debut the following day. He went on to sign a professional contract with the club and became 1st choice keeper for the club signing a contract until the end of the season

== Career statistics ==
As of match played 30 December 2017

Appearances and goals by club, season and competition
| Club | Season | League | | | National Cup | | League Cup | | Other | | Total | |
| Club | Season | Division | Apps | Goals | Apps | Goals | Apps | Goals | Apps | Goals | Apps | Goals |
|---|---|---|---|---|---|---|---|---|---|---|---|---|
| Stade Rennais II | 2010–11 | CFA | 4 | 0 | — | | — | | 0 | 0 | 4 | 0 |
| Les Herbiers | 2012–13 | CFA | 2 | 0 | 0 | 0 | — | | 0 | 0 | 2 | 0 |
| Pontivy | 2013–14 | CFA | 30 | 0 | 0 | 0 | — | | 0 | 0 | 30 | 0 |
| Poiré-sur-Vie II | 2014–15 | CFA 2 | 7 | 0 | — | | — | | 0 | 0 | 7 | 0 |
| Poiré-sur-Vie | 2014–15 | National | 3 | 0 | 0 | 0 | 0 | 0 | 0 | 0 | 3 | 0 |
| Plymouth Argyle | 2015–16 | League Two | 1 | 0 | 0 | 0 | 0 | 0 | 0 | 0 | 1 | 0 |
| Plymouth Argyle | 2016–17 | League Two | 0 | 0 | 0 | 0 | 1 | 0 | 3 (Note: Appearances in the EFL Trophy) | 0 | 4 | 0 |
| Plymouth Argyle | Plymouth total | | 1 | 0 | 0 | 0 | 1 | 0 | 3 | 0 | 5 | 0 |
| Torquay United | 2017–18 | National League | 20 | 0 | 1 | 0 | — | | 0 | 0 | 21 | 0 |
| Career total | | | 67 | 0 | 1 | 0 | 1 | 0 | 3 | 0 | 72 | 0 |
