= Jakub Sokolík =

Czech footballer

Personal information
- Full name: Jakub Sokolík
- Date of birth: 28 August 1993 (age 33)
- Place of birth: Ostrava, Czech Republic
- Height: 6 ft 1 in (1.85 m)
- Position: Defender

Youth career
- 1999–2009: Baník Ostrava
- 2009–2013: Liverpool

Senior career*
Years	Team	Apps	(Gls)
2013–2014	Liverpool	0	(0)
2014	→ Southend United (loan)	10	(0)
2014–2016	Yeovil Town	45	(1)
2014	→ Southend United (loan)	1	(0)
2016	Southend United	5	(0)
2017–2018	Plymouth Argyle	20	(1)
2018	Torquay United	7	(0)

International career
2008–2009	Czech Republic U16	7	(0)
2010	Czech Republic U17	5	(0)
- * Club domestic league appearances and goals as of 22:01, 25 June 2019 (UTC)

Jakub Sokolík (born 28 August 1993) is a Czech professional footballer who plays as a defender, most recently for Torquay United.

== Club career ==
=== Liverpool ===
Sokolík joined the youth academy of Baník Ostrava when he was 6 years old in 1999. During his time at the academy, Sokolík attended Ostrava-Kunčice Secondary School. He then signed for the Liverpool's youth academy in 2009. Sokolík made his debut for the reserve team against Everton reserves. He then progressed through the ranks of the academy and reserves team throughout his time there.

Following this, Sokolík was released by Liverpool.

==== Southend United (first spell) ====
After a successful trial, Sokolík joined Southend United in League Two on loan on 11 March 2014 for the rest of the season.

His first involvement with the club was in a match against Scunthorpe United where he was an unused substitute. In a follow–up against Bury on 15 March 2014, Sokolík made his debut for Southend United after starting the match instead of Mark Philips and helped the club keep a clean sheet, in a 0–0 draw. This was followed up by helping Southend United keep three more clean sheets in the next three matches. Since joining the club, he quickly established himself in the first team, playing in the centre–back position for the rest of the season. Sokolík helped Southend United keep two consecutive clean sheets between 18 April 2014 and 21 April 2014 against Rochdale and Accrington Stanley. He played in both legs of the League Two play–offs against Burton Albion, as the club lost 3–2 on aggregate. At the end of the 2013–14 season, Sokolík went on to make twelve appearances in all competitions.

=== Yeovil Town ===
Soon after being released by Liverpool, Sokolík signed for Yeovil Town on a two-year contract on 30 June 2014 despite interests to make a return to Southend United on a permanent basis. Upon joining the club, he was given a number six shirt.

Sokolík made his Yeovil Town debut, starting in the centre–back position, in a 3–0 loss against Doncaster Rovers in the opening game of the season. For the next three months, he quickly established himself in the first team, playing in either the centre–back position and right–back position. However, injuries and completions restricted his appearances in the first team. By the time Sokolík was loaned out to Southend United, he made twelve appearances in all competitions.

Ahead of the 2015–16 season, Sokolík managed to recover from his injury and was featured in Yeovil Town's friendly matches. Since the start of the 2015–16 season, he quickly regained his first team place for the club, playing in the centre–back position. Sokolík scored his first goal for Yeovil Town, in a 2–2 draw against Dagenham & Redbridge on 10 October 2015. A month later on 7 November 2015, however, he received a red card in the 7th minute for an unprofessional foul, as the club won 1–0 against Maidstone United in the first round of the FA Cup. After serving a three match suspension, Sokolík returned to the starting line–up against Stevenage in the second round of the FA Cup and helped the club keep a clean in a 1–0 win on 5 December 2015. He then set up a goal for François Zoko to score Yeovil Town's only goal of the game, in a 1–1 draw against Portsmouth on 20 February 2016. Sokolík followed up by helping the club keep three clean sheets in the next three matches. He, once again, helped Yeovil Town keep another three consecutive clean sheets between 25 March 2016 and 5 April 2016 against Carlisle United, Newport County and Stevenage. At the end of the 2015–16 season, Sokolík went on to make forty appearances and scoring once in all competitions. Following this, he was released by the club upon expiry of contract.

==== Southend United (second spell) ====
On 31 October 2014, Sokolík re-joined Southend United on a one-month loan deal. The next day, he made his second debut for the club, starting the whole game, in a 2–1 win over Mansfield Town. However, Sokolík soon lost his first team place due to competitions in Southend United's defence and was placed on the substitute bench once he returned from suspension. Despite this, Sokolík loan spell with the club was extended until 3 January 2015. However, Sokolík's loan spell with Southend United was soon cut after a knee injury kept him out for three months, which was later extended later in the 2014–15 season. By the time he departed from the club, Sokolík made two appearances in all competitions.

=== Southend United (third spell) ===
On 15 July 2016, Sokolík went on trial at Southend United in hopes of winning a contract with the club. Having made an impression at the trial, it was announced on 29 July 2016 that the club signed him on a five-month contract until 31 December 2016 with a view to a longer-term deal.

He made his third debut for Southend United, starting the whole game, and set up the club's only goal of the game, in a 3–1 loss against Gillingham in the first round of the League Cup on 9 August 2016. Following this, Sokolík was dropped from the squad for the next three matches. He didn't make his return to the first team until a match against Brighton & Hove Albion U23 on 30 August 2016 in the EFL Trophy, starting a match and played 88 minutes, as Southend United won 2–0. Sokolík appeared in the next two matches against Bolton Wanderers and Scunthorpe United. However, he found himself out of the first team for two months, due to competitions in the club's defence. As a result, Sokolík made four more appearances by the end of the year. Because of his lack of first team opportunities, his departure from Southend United was confirmed on 4 January 2017. By the time he departed from the club, Sokolík made nine appearances in all competitions.

=== Plymouth Argyle ===
On 4 January 2017, Plymouth Argyle confirmed Sokolík had joined them after his contract at Southend United ran down.

He made his debut for the club, coming on as a second-half substitute, in a 2–1 loss against Cheltenham Town on 21 January 2017. In a follow–up match against Yeovil Town, Sokolík made his first start for Plymouth Argyle, as the club lost 2–1. Since joining Plymouth Argyle, he was featured heavily in the remainder of the 2016–17 season. Sokolík helped the club keep two consecutive clean sheets in two separate matches. At the end of the 2016–17 season, he went on to make eighteen appearances and scoring once in all competitions.

Ahead of the 2017–18 season, Sokolík was given a number twenty shirt. However, he featured very little in the 2017–18 season, with just five appearances coming his way by the start of the new year. Sokolík left Plymouth Argyle by mutual consent on 31 January 2018.

=== Torquay United ===
After being released by Plymouth Argyle, Sokolík signed for Torquay United on 16 February 2018 for the rest of the 2017–18 season.

He made his debut for the club, playing the whole game, in a 3–0 loss against Dagenham & Redbridge on 17 February 2018. Sokolík then started in the next four matches for Torquay United. However, he found himself out of the first team for the rest of the season, due to being sidelined with injuries. As Sokolík was absent from the first team, the club were relegated to the National League South following a 1–1 away draw at Hartlepool United. At the end of the 2017–18 season, he went on to make five appearances in all competitions. Following this, Sokolík was held talks over a new contract by Torquay United. On 16 May 2018, Sokolík signed a contract extension with Torquay United.

However at the start of the 2018–19 season, Sokolík appeared twice for Torquay United before he suffered a knee ligament damage in the 70th minute and was substituted, as the club won 2–0 against East Thurrock United on 11 August 2018. After the match, it was announced that Sokolík would be out for a month. It was announced on 23 December 2018 that he left Torquay United by mutual consent. By the time Sokolík left the club, he made seven appearances in all competitions.

== International career ==
Sokolík represented Czech Republic U16 between 2008 and 2009, as he went on to make seven appearances for the U16 side. The following year, Sokolík represented Czech Republic U17, as he went on to make five appearances for the U17 side.

== Career statistics ==
As of 25 June 2019.

Appearances and goals by club, season and competition
Club	Season	League			FA Cup		League Cup		Other		Total	
Club	Season	Division	Apps	Goals	Apps	Goals	Apps	Goals	Apps	Goals	Apps	Goals
Liverpool	2013–14	Premier League	0	0	0	0	0	0	0	0	0	0
Southend United (loan)	2013–14	League Two	10	0	0	0	0	0	2 (Note: Appearances in League Two play-offs)	0	12	0
Yeovil Town	2014–15	League One	11	0	0	0	1	0	0	0	12	0
Yeovil Town	2015–16	League Two	34	1	4	0	1	0	1 (Note: Appearance in Football League Trophy)	0	40	1
Yeovil Town	Total		45	1	4	0	2	0	1	0	52	1
Southend United (loan)	2014–15	League Two	1	0	1	0	0	0	0	0	2	0
Southend United	2016–17	League One	5	0	1	0	1	0	2 (Note: Appearances in EFL Trophy)	0	9	0
Plymouth Argyle	2016–17	League Two	18	1	—		—		—		18	1
Plymouth Argyle	2017–18	League One	2	0	0	0	1	0	2 (Note: Appearances in EFL Trophy)	0	5	0
Plymouth Argyle	Total		20	1	0	0	1	0	2	0	23	1
Torquay United	2017–18	National League	5	0	—		—		—		5	0
Torquay United	2018–19	National League South	2	0	0	0	—		0	0	2	0
Torquay United	Total		7	0	0	0	—		0	0	7	0
Career total			88	2	6	0	4	0	7	0	105	2
