= Craig Tanner (footballer) =

English footballer

Personal information
- Full name: Craig David Tanner
- Date of birth: 27 October 1994 (age 32)
- Place of birth: Camberley, England
- Height: 1.71 m (5 ft 7 in)
- Positions: Striker; winger

Team information
- Current team: AFC Totton

Youth career
- 2003–2013: Reading

Senior career*
Years	Team	Apps	(Gls)
2013–2017	Reading	3	(0)
2015	→ AFC Wimbledon (loan)	19	(0)
2015–2016	→ Plymouth Argyle (loan)	42	(4)
2016–2017	→ Plymouth Argyle (loan)	26	(5)
2017–2019	Motherwell	26	(6)
2019–2021	Aldershot Town	28	(7)
2021–2025	Ebbsfleet United	96	(12)
2025–	AFC Totton	57	(1)

International career
- England U16
- * Club domestic league appearances and goals as of 13:27, 18 August 2026 (UTC)

Craig David Tanner (born 27 October 1994) is an English professional footballer who plays as a striker or winger who plays for National League South club AFC Totton.

Tanner began his career with Reading and spent time on loan at AFC Wimbledon and Plymouth Argyle (twice) before joining Motherwell in June 2017.

== Career ==
=== Reading ===
Tanner joined Reading's under-8s academy team in 2003. In March 2011, Tanner signed his first professional contract with Reading, going through to the end of the 2014–15 season. Tanner made his debut, and scored his first goal, for Reading in their 3–1 League Cup victory over Newport County on 12 August 2014, coming on as a substitute.

On 22 January 2015, Tanner signed a new contract with Reading, lasting until the summer of 2017, and joined AFC Wimbledon on loan for the rest of the season.

==== Plymouth Argyle (loans) ====
On 5 August 2015, Tanner signed for Plymouth Argyle on loan until 2 January 2016. Tanner scored his first goal for the club, a stunning volley from the edge of the area, in a 2–1 defeat against Gillingham in the League Cup. On 6 January 2016, Tanner's loan at Plymouth Argyle was extended until the end of the season.

On 18 August 2016, Tanner returned to Plymouth Argyle on loan until 16 January 2017, extending his stay until the end of the season on 16 January 2017.

=== Motherwell ===
On 5 June 2017, Motherwell announced the signing of Tanner on a two-year contract. He made his debut for the club away to Queen's Park in the group stage of the Scottish League Cup, scoring Motherwell's second goal in a 5–1 win. He scored his first league goal on 30 September 2017, in a 3–0 win at home against Partick Thistle. Tanner's first season at Motherwell ended early when he suffered a knee injury in training, described by manager Stephen Robinson as a "freak incident" which was expected to keep him out for up to six months.

In November 2018, having twice undergone surgery on his injury, Motherwell assistant manager Keith Lasley announced that Tanner would remain out until at least January 2019. Having failed to feature during the 2018–19 season, he was offered a short-term contract with a view to an extension upon his return to fitness.

Having made his return to action he featured for Motherwell's reserve side. However, on 2 September 2019, he left the club having turned down their contract offer.

=== Aldershot Town ===
On 9 December 2019, Aldershot Town announced the signing of Tanner on a contract until the end of the 2019–20 season.

=== Ebbsfleet United ===
On 21 June 2021, Tanner joined National League South side Ebbsfleet United, rejecting a contract extension with Aldershot.

On 23 January 2025, he departed the club by mutual consent.

=== AFC Totton ===
On 24 January 2025, Tanner joined Southern League Premier Division South club AFC Totton.

== Career statistics ==
As of 24 January 2025

Appearances and goals by club, season and competition
Club	Season	League			National cup		League cup		Other		Total	
Club	Season	Division	Apps	Goals	Apps	Goals	Apps	Goals	Apps	Goals	Apps	Goals
Reading	2014–15	Championship	3	0	0	0	2	1	–		5	1
Reading	2015–16	Championship	0	0	0	0	0	0	–		0	0
Reading	2016–17	Championship	0	0	0	0	0	0	0 (Note: Appearances in The EFL Championship Playoffs)	0	0	0
Reading	Total		3	0	0	0	2	1	0	0	5	1
AFC Wimbledon (Loan)	2014–15	League Two	19	0	0	0	0	0	0 (Note: Appearances in Football League Trophy)	0	19	0
Plymouth Argyle (Loan)	2015–16	League Two	42	4	1	0	1	1	6 (Note: Three Appearances in Play-offs and three appearances in the Football League Trophy)	1	50	6
Plymouth Argyle (Loan)	2016–17	League Two	26	5	5	0	0	0	3	1	34	6
Plymouth Argyle (Loan)	Total		68	9	6	0	1	1	9	2	84	12
Motherwell	2017–18	Scottish Premiership	26	6	3	2	7	1	–		36	9
Motherwell	2018–19	Scottish Premiership	0	0	0	0	0	0	–		0	0
Motherwell	2019–20	Scottish Premiership	0	0	0	0	0	0	–		0	0
Motherwell	Total		26	6	3	2	7	1	0	0	36	9
Aldershot Town	2019–20	National League	12	4	0	0	–		1 (Note: Appearance in the FA Trophy)	0	13	4
Aldershot Town	2020–21	National League	16	3	1	0	–		0	0	17	3
Aldershot Town	Total		28	7	1	0	0	0	1	0	30	7
Ebbsfleet United	2021–22	National League South	32	7	2	0	–		2 (Note: One appearance in FA Trophy, one appearance and one goal in National League South play-offs)	1	36	8
Ebbsfleet United	2022–23	National League South	22	4	5	0	—		1	0	28	4
Ebbsfleet United	2023–24	National League	26	1	2	0	—		0	0	28	1
Ebbsfleet United	2024–25	National League	16	0	1	0	—		3 (Note: Appearance(s) in National League Cup)	0	20	0
Ebbsfleet United	Total		96	12	10	0	0	0	6	1	112	13
Career total			240	34	20	2	10	3	16	3	286	42

== Honours ==
Reading

- U21 Premier League Cup: 2013–14

Ebbsfleet United

- National League South: 2022–23
