= Jake Jervis =

English footballer (born 1991)

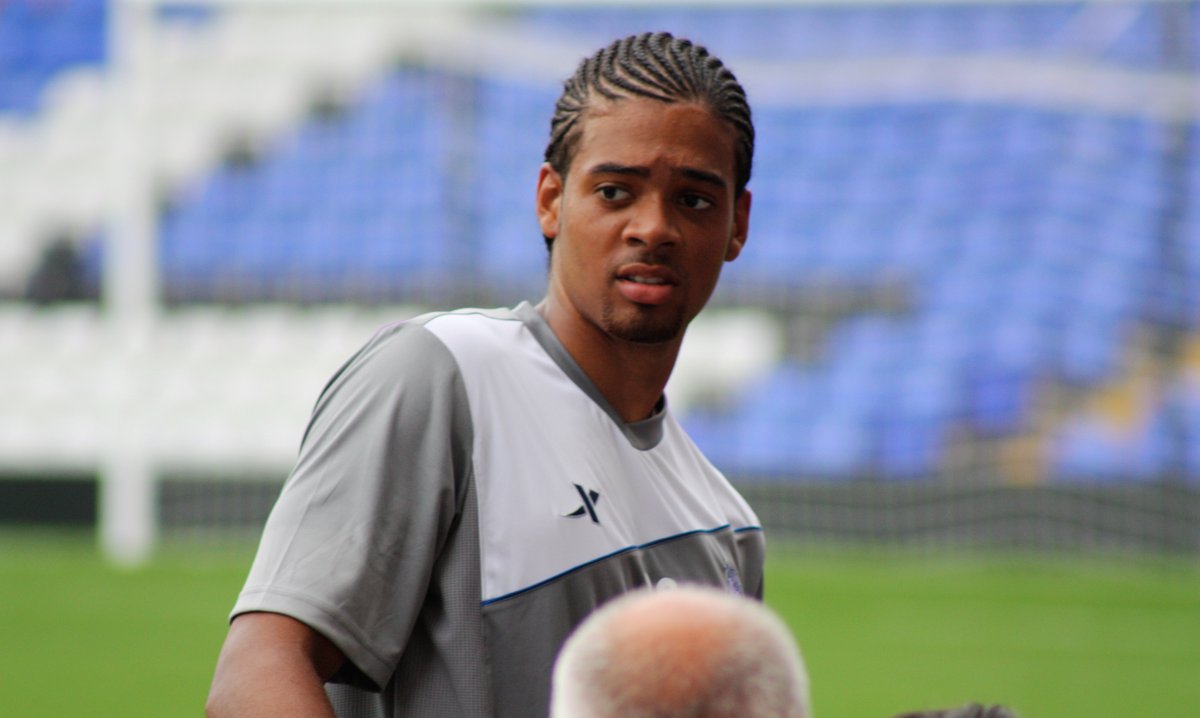
- Jervis warming up for Birmingham City in 2011

Personal information
- Full name: Jake Mario Jervis
- Date of birth: 17 September 1991 (age 35)
- Place of birth: Wolverhampton, England
- Height: 6 ft 4 in (1.93 m)
- Positions: Winger; striker

Team information
- Current team: Bromsgrove Sporting

Youth career
- 2001–2003: Wolverhampton Wanderers
- 2003–2006: Shrewsbury Town
- 2006–2010: Birmingham City

Senior career*
Years	Team	Apps	(Gls)
2010–2013	Birmingham City	2	(0)
2010	→ Hereford United (loan)	7	(2)
2010–2011	→ Notts County (loan)	10	(0)
2011	→ Hereford United (loan)	4	(0)
2011	→ Swindon Town (loan)	12	(3)
2012	→ Preston North End (loan)	5	(2)
2012	→ Carlisle United (loan)	5	(3)
2012	→ Tranmere Rovers (loan)	4	(1)
2012	→ Portsmouth (loan)	3	(1)
2013	Elazığspor	4	(1)
2014	Portsmouth	15	(4)
2014–2015	Ross County	27	(4)
2015–2018	Plymouth Argyle	108	(27)
2018–2020	Luton Town	12	(0)
2018–2019	→ AFC Wimbledon (loan)	23	(2)
2019–2020	→ Salford City (loan)	20	(4)
2020–2022	SJK	54	(17)
2023	East Bengal	5	(1)
2023	KuPS	10	(1)
2023–2024	Brackley Town	4	(0)
2024–2026	Hednesford Town	31	(5)
- * Club domestic league appearances and goals as of 14:09, 17 March 2025 (UTC)

Jake Mario Jervis (born 17 September 1991) is an English professional footballer who plays as a winger or striker for Southern League Premier Division Central club Bromsgrove Sporting

Jervis made his first-team debut for Birmingham City in the FA Cup in January 2010, first appeared in the Football League while on loan to Hereford United in March 2010, and has also played on loan at Notts County, Swindon Town, Preston North End, Carlisle United, Tranmere Rovers and Portsmouth. He spent six months with Turkish Süper Lig club Elazığspor in 2013, rejoined Portsmouth in 2014, and then spent a season in Scotland with Ross County. He spent the longest spell of his senior career, of two-and-a-half seasons, with Plymouth Argyle before signing for Luton Town in January 2018. After spells on loan at AFC Wimbledon and Salford City, he signed for Finnish club SJK in 2020. After two-and-a-half seasons, he joined Indian club East Bengal in 2023, finished the summer season back in Finland with KuPS, and after a month with Brackley Town, signed for Hednesford Town in February 2024. Jervis signed for Bromsgrove Sporting in May 2026.

== Club career ==
=== Early career ===
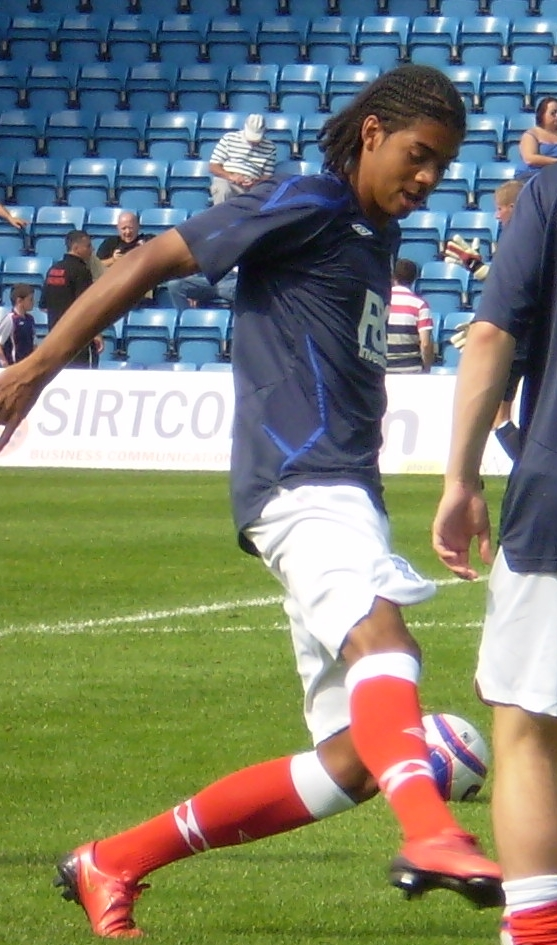
Jervis in 2008 pre-season

Jervis began his football career as a youngster with Wolverhampton Wanderers, moving on to Shrewsbury Town as a 12-year-old. After three years with Shrewsbury, Jervis joined Birmingham City's Academy. In 2008, he was a second-half substitute as a mixture of senior and reserve players won the Birmingham Senior Cup, and in 2009 he helped the academy team reach the semi-final of the FA Youth Cup.

=== Birmingham City ===
==== 2009–10 season ====
Following three goals in three matches for the reserves, Jervis made his first-team debut on 23 January 2010, coming on as a substitute for Christian Benítez in the FA Cup against Everton at Goodison Park. He played the last 11 minutes as Birmingham protected a 2–1 lead. He later described his debut as "the best experience I've had so far in football".

In March 2010, Jervis signed his first professional contract, of two and a half years. The following week, Jervis joined League Two club Hereford United on a one-month youth loan, to gain experience of first-team football. Despite signing too late to train with his new teammates before the League match against Bradford City on 20 March, he was included among the substitutes. He came into the match in the 70th minute, and scored the second goal of a 2–0 win; according to the club's website, "his first touch controlled the ball well and the second saw him lift the ball over the onrushing [goalkeeper]". He scored with a penalty kick in his second appearance, a 2–1 victory at Chesterfield, and returned to Birmingham at the end of his one-month loan having started five matches and appeared twice as a substitute.

==== 2010–11 season ====
Prior to the start of the 2010–11 season, Jervis joined Notts County, newly promoted to League One, on loan until January 2011. Jervis played regularly at the beginning of his loan spell, though usually as substitute, but made only one brief first-team appearance after Paul Ince took over as manager at the end of October. In January 2011, Jervis returned to Hereford United on a one-month youth loan but he returned after the loan was not extended.

==== 2011–12 season ====
In the absence through injury of strikers Cameron Jerome, Marlon King and Nikola Žigić, Jervis was named in the 20-man squad for Birmingham's Europa League match against Nacional in Madeira in August. An unused substitute in the first leg, he made a brief appearance in the second leg, replacing Chris Wood in the 89th minute as Birmingham won 3–0 to qualify for the group stage.

On 29 September, Jervis joined Swindon Town of League Two on loan for a month. He made his debut the following day, replacing Mehdi Kerrouche after an hour as Swindon lost 2–0 away at Macclesfield Town. Jervis scored two goals, one from close range and the second after dispossessing goalkeeper Artur Krysiak – a former teammate at Birmingham – as Swindon beat Exeter City 2–1 to progress to the area quarter-finals of the Football League Trophy. The loan was extended until 30 December, and Jervis returned to Birmingham having made 14 appearances and scored 5 goals in all competitions.

On 1 January 2012, Jervis joined Preston North End of League One on a 28-day youth loan. He went straight into the starting eleven for their match the following day, and scored the opening goal as Preston drew 1–1 away to Rochdale. He returned to Birmingham at the end of the month having scored twice from five appearances.

Jervis was a 71st-minute substitute, replacing Adam Rooney, as Birmingham drew 1–1 away to Chelsea in the fifth round of the FA Cup. He signed a one-year contract extension at the end of the season.

==== 2012–13 season ====
On 22 August, Jervis joined Carlisle United of League One on loan for a month. He made his debut three days later and scored as Carlisle beat Portsmouth 4–2. He missed his penalty in the shootout against Preston North End as Carlisle were eliminated from the Football League Trophy, and the next weekend he missed an open goal against Hartlepool United, although Carlisle still won the match. Two first-half goals against Swindon Town meant he returned to Birmingham having scored three times in five league matches.

With their top scorer Jean-Louis Akpa Akpro out injured for three months, League One leaders Tranmere Rovers signed Jervis on loan in time for him to make another goal-scoring debut as his new club lost 3–1 at AFC Bournemouth on 20 October. He damaged an ankle during the match, so missed two weeks of his loan spell, making four more appearances without scoring. Within days of his return to Birmingham, he moved to another League One club, Portsmouth, on a one-month loan. He scored once in three appearances before the loan was extended until 4 January 2013, but two days later he was recalled after injuries to Marlon King and Peter Løvenkrands left Birmingham with Nikola Žigić as their only fit senior striker. He made his first league appearance for Birmingham on 29 December, replacing Callum Reilly shortly after Bolton Wanderers took a 3–1 lead.

=== Elazıgspor ===
Jervis moved abroad for the first time, joining Elazığspor, near the bottom of the Turkish Süper Lig, in January 2013 for a fee reported as €50,000. He signed a three-and-a-half-year contract. Included in the starting eleven for the away match against Fenerbahçe on 20 January, Jervis opened the scoring with an 11th-minute header; the match finished 2–2, as Fenerbahçe equalised in the third minute of stoppage time. After three matches he broke his foot, played only one more league match, and the club defaulted on his wages.

=== Portsmouth ===
He trained with Sheffield United, Coventry City, and with his former club Portsmouth. They and Sheffield United wanted to sign him, but his age meant that any new club would be liable for training and development compensation unless this were waived by his previous club. Furthermore, although his contract with Elazıgspor was eventually cancelled in September 2013, a FIFA investigation concluded he had still been registered with that club when the transfer window closed, so could not sign for another until the next window opened in January 2014. On 9 January, he signed for Portsmouth until the end of the season.

=== Ross County ===
On 7 June 2014, Jervis signed for Scottish Premiership club Ross County. He scored on his debut against St Johnstone in a 2–1 defeat, and finished the season with four goals from 27 league matches.

=== Plymouth Argyle ===
On 29 June 2015, Jervis agreed a one-year contract with League Two club Plymouth Argyle, linking up again with manager Derek Adams who had signed him for Ross County. He scored his first goal for Plymouth in a 4–1 win over Carlisle United on 18 August 2015. Jervis scored 13 goals in 49 appearances as Plymouth were promoted to League One after finishing second in League Two in 2016–17.

=== Luton Town ===
Jervis signed a two-and-a-half-year deal with another League Two club, Luton Town, on 31 January 2018; the fee was undisclosed. He joined Luton's League One rivals AFC Wimbledon on 31 August 2018 on a season-long loan. Jervis was loaned out again on 2 September 2019, joining League Two club Salford City until the end of the 2019–20 season.

=== Spells abroad ===
On 19 August 2020, Jervis joined Veikkausliiga side SJK on a deal until the end of the season. In November 2020, he extended his contract with the Finnish club until the end of the 2022 season.

In July 2023, after a short spell with Indian Super League club East Bengal, Jervis returned to Finland, signing with KuPS until the end of the season. He helped the team finish as runners-up in the Veikkausliga, and left when his contract expired.

=== Return to England ===
Jervis signed for Brackley Town of the National League North on 5 December 2023, and made his debut the same day in the starting eleven for a 1–0 defeat away to Chester. He made five appearances before leaving the club a month later when his contract expired. Jervis joined Northern Premier League Division One West club Hednesford Town on 16 February. He scored his first league goal for the club on 1 April in a 4–3 defeat to Nantwich Town, and five days later in a 1–1 draw with Prescot Cables. Hednesford finished the season in the relegation places, but received a reprieve, and Jervis signed on for a further year.

== Personal life ==
Jervis was born in Wolverhampton and brought up in Telford.

== Career statistics ==
As of match played 15 March 2025

Appearances and goals by club, season and competition
Club	Season	League			National cup (Note: Includes FA Cup, Turkish Cup, Scottish Cup, Finnish Cup, Super Cup (India))		League cup (Note: Includes Football League Cup/EFL Cup, Scottish League Cup, Finnish League Cup)		Continental		Other		Total	
Club	Season	Division	Apps	Goals	Apps	Goals	Apps	Goals	Apps	Goals	Apps	Goals	Apps	Goals
Birmingham City	2009–10	Premier League	0	0	1	0	0	0	—		—		1	0
Birmingham City	2010–11	Premier League	0	0	0	0	—		—		—		0	0
Birmingham City	2011–12	Championship	0	0	1	0	0	0	1 (Note: Appearance in UEFA Europa League)	0	—		2	0
Birmingham City	2012–13	Championship	2	0	—		0	0	—		—		2	0
Birmingham City	Total		2	0	2	0	0	0	1	0	0	0	5	0
Hereford United (loan)	2009–10	League Two	7	2	—		—		—		—		7	2
Notts County (loan)	2010–11	League One	10	0	—		3	0	—		1 (Note: Appearance(s) in Football League Trophy)	0	14	0
Hereford United (loan)	2010–11	League Two	4	0	1	0	—		—		—		5	0
Swindon Town (loan)	2011–12	League Two	12	3	—		—		—		2	2	14	5
Preston North End (loan)	2011–12	League One	5	2	—		—		—		—		5	2
Carlisle United (loan)	2012–13	League One	5	3	—		0	0	—		1	0	6	3
Tranmere Rovers (loan)	2012–13	League One	4	1	1	0	—		—		—		5	1
Portsmouth (loan)	2012–13	League One	3	1	—		—		—		—		3	1
Elazığspor	2012–13	Süper Lig	4	1	—		—		—		—		4	1
Portsmouth	2013–14	League Two	15	4	—		—		—		—		15	4
Ross County	2014–15	Scottish Premiership	27	4	1	1	1	0	—		—		29	5
Plymouth Argyle	2015–16	League Two	42	11	1	0	1	0	—		6 (Note: Three appearances and three goals in Football League Trophy, three appearances in League Two play-offs)	3	50	14
Plymouth Argyle	2016–17	League Two	42	12	4	0	1	0	—		2 (Note: Appearances in EFL Trophy)	1	49	13
Plymouth Argyle	2017–18	League One	24	4	2	0	0	0	—		2	0	28	4
Plymouth Argyle	Total		108	27	7	0	2	0	0	0	10	4	127	31
Luton Town	2017–18	League Two	10	0	—		—		—		—		10	0
Luton Town	2018–19	League One	2	0	—		1	0	—		—		3	0
Luton Town	2019–20	Championship	0	0	0	0	1	1	—		—		1	1
Luton Town	Total		12	0	0	0	2	1	—		—		14	1
AFC Wimbledon (loan)	2018–19	League One	23	2	4	0	—		—		3	0	30	2
Salford City (loan)	2019–20	League Two	20	4	0	0	—		—		4	1	24	5
SJK	2020	Veikkausliiga	10	3	—		—		—		—		10	3
SJK	2021	Veikkausliiga	26	8	4	0	—		—		—		30	8
SJK	2022	Veikkausliiga	18	6	1	0	4	1	4 (Note: Appearances in UEFA Europa Conference League)	3	—		27	10
SJK	Total		54	17	5	0	4	1	4	3	0	0	67	21
East Bengal	2022–23	Indian Super League	5	1	2	0	—		—		—		7	1
KuPS	2023	Veikkausliiga	10	1	—		—		2	0	—		12	1
Brackley Town	2023–24	National League North	4	0	—		—		—		1 (Note: Appearance in FA Trophy)	0	5	0
Hednesford Town	2023–24	Northern Premier League (NPL) Division One West	10	3	—		—		—		2 (Note: One appearance and one goal in Birmingham Senior Cup, one appearance in Walsall Senior Cup)	1	12	4
Hednesford Town	2024–25	NPL Division One West	21	2	7	1	—		—		4 (Note: Two appearances in FA Trophy, one appearance and one goal in Staffordshire Senior Cup, one appearance in Walsall Senior Cup)	2	32	5
Hednesford Town	Total		31	5	7	1	—		—		6	3	44	9
Career total			365	78	30	2	12	2	7	3	28	10	442	95

== Honours ==
Birmingham City

- Birmingham Senior Cup: 2007–08

Swindon Town

- Football League Two: 2011–12

Plymouth Argyle

- EFL League Two runner-up: 2016–17

Luton Town

- EFL League Two runner-up: 2017–18

Hednesford Town

- Northern Premier League Division One West play-offs: 2025
