= Kelle Roos =

Dutch footballer (born 1992)

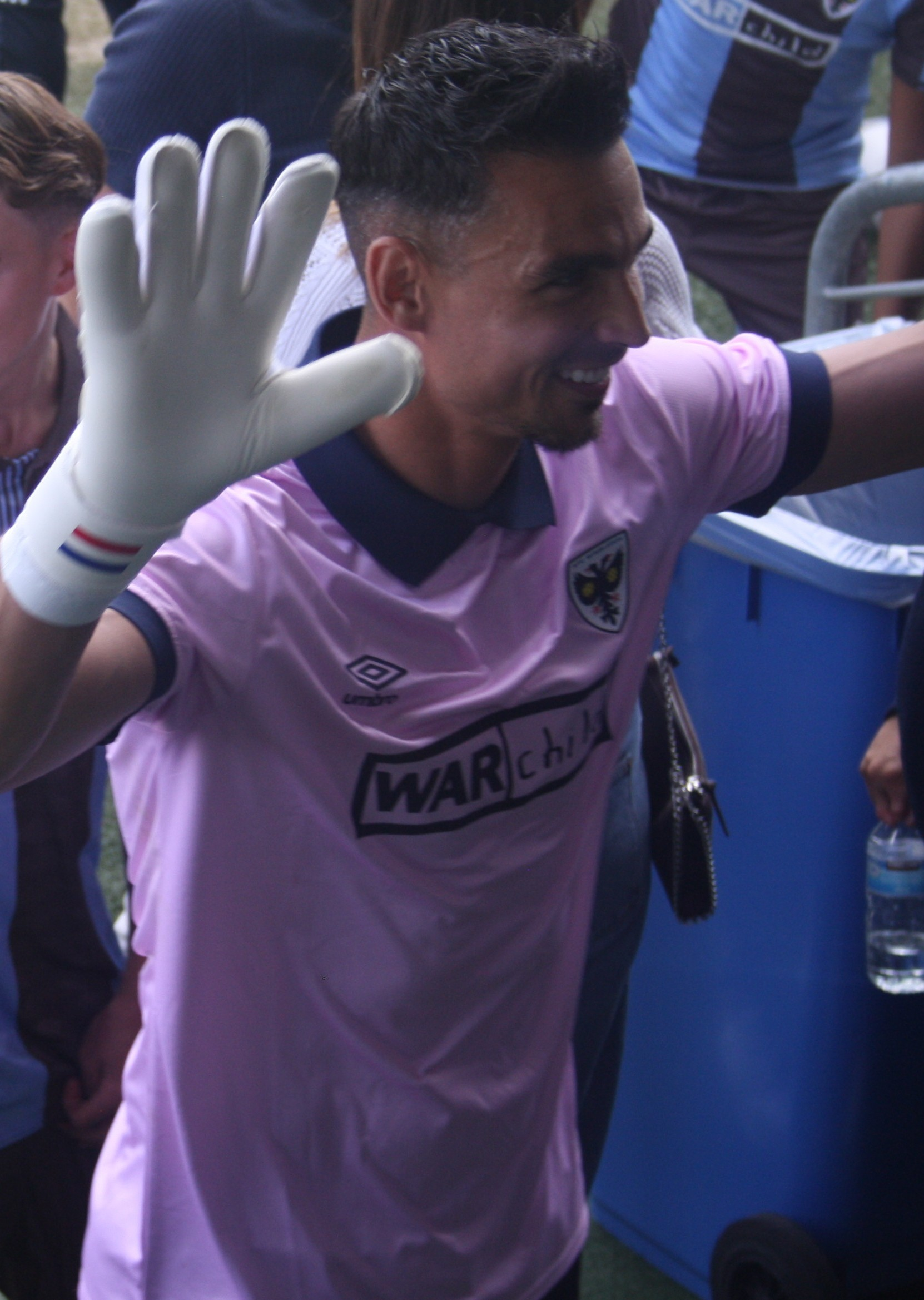
- Roos in 2016.

Personal information
- Full name: Kelle Willem Roos
- Date of birth: 31 May 1992 (age 34)
- Place of birth: Rijkevoort, Netherlands
- Height: 1.96 m (6 ft 5 in)
- Position: Goalkeeper

Youth career
- 1996–2001: VV Toxandria
- 2001–2002: VV Trekvogels
- 2002–2004: Juliana '31
- 2004–2005: Quick 1888
- 2005–2011: PSV Eindhoven
- 2011–2012: Willem II
- 2012–2013: N.E.C.

Senior career*
Years	Team	Apps	(Gls)
2013	Nuenen		
2013–2014	Nuneaton Town	9	(0)
2014–2022	Derby County	70	(0)
2015	→ Rotherham United (loan)	4	(0)
2016	→ AFC Wimbledon (loan)	17	(0)
2016–2017	→ Bristol Rovers (loan)	17	(0)
2017	→ Port Vale (loan)	8	(0)
2017	→ Plymouth Argyle (loan)	4	(0)
2022–2024	Aberdeen	68	(0)
2024–2025	Triestina	38	(0)
2025–2026	Notts County	24	(0)
2026	→ Kilmarnock (loan)	11	(0)

International career
2006–2007	Netherlands U15	2	(0)
- * Club domestic league appearances and goals as of 18:02, 5 May 2026 (UTC)

Kelle Willem Roos (born 31 May 1992) is a Dutch professional footballer who most recently played as a goalkeeper for EFL League One club Notts County.

Roos spent his youth with a wide variety of Dutch clubs, including VV Toxandria, VV Trekvogels, Juliana '31, Quick 1888, PSV Eindhoven, Willem II, N.E.C., and Nuenen. He earned a contract at English Conference Premier side Nuneaton Town in November 2013. He gained much attention from clubs throughout England with his performances during a run of clean sheets. He was sold to Derby County for £30,000 in January 2014 and made his first-team debut for the club nine months later. He joined Rotherham United on loan in July 2015 but struggled with inconsistency and had his loan spell cancelled after just six weeks. He joined AFC Wimbledon on loan in February 2016. He enjoyed a much more successful spell, keeping goal as the club won promotion with a 2–0 victory in the 2016 League Two play-off final. He spent the first half of the 2016–17 season on loan at Bristol Rovers and joined Port Vale and then Plymouth Argyle on emergency loans in the first half of the 2017–18 season. He broke into the Derby first team in January 2019.

Roos left Derby at the end of the 2021–22 season and signed for Scottish club Aberdeen, where he remained for two years. He joined Italian club Triestina in July 2024. He signed with English club Notts County in July 2025 and returned to Scotland on loan at Kilmarnock in January 2026.

== Early life ==
Roos grew up in Rijkevoort and excelled at both football and tennis as a child, but decided to focus on football at the age of 13, having settled as a goalkeeper the previous year. Despite being dyslexic, he worked hard at school to qualify for a place at university.

== Club career ==
=== Early career ===
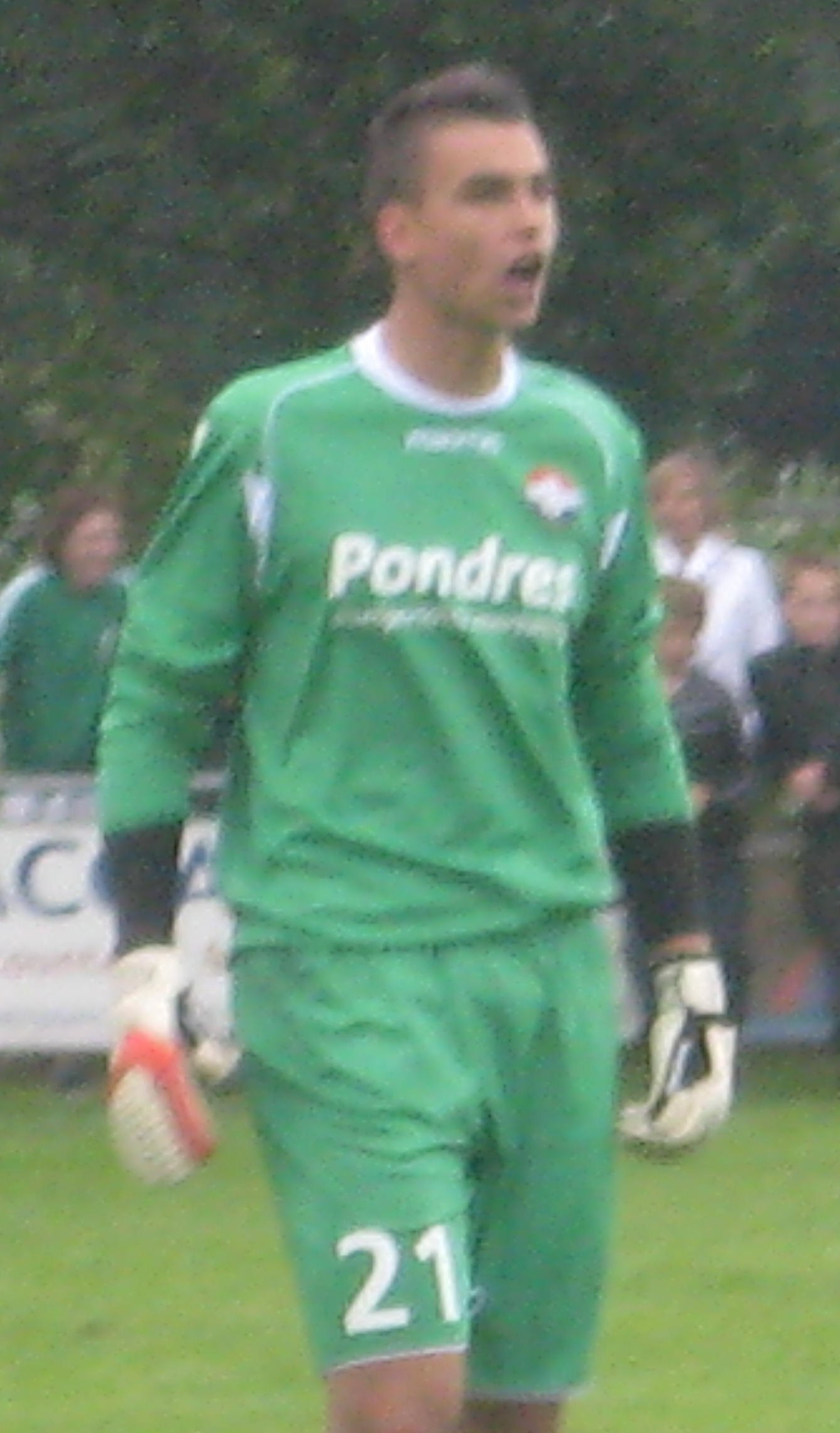
Roos playing for Willem II in September 2009

Roos began his career at amateur Dutch clubs VV Toxandria, VV Trekvogels, Juliana '31 and Quick 1888, before moving to PSV Eindhoven in 2005. After six years at the PSV Academy he moved to Willem II, where injuries hampered his progress, before moving to N.E.C. in 2012. At the start of the 2013–14 season, Roos had a trial at English Championship club Birmingham City and then at League One side Bristol City. He competed with Elliot Parish for the chance to win a permanent contract, with manager Sean O'Driscoll then signing Parish permanently. O'Driscoll also wanted to sign Roos and loan him out, but financial restraints left him only able to sign one of the pair. Having failed to earn a contract and unable to join a league side as the transfer window had closed, Roos returned to the Netherlands and signed for amateur Hoofdklasse side Nuenen.

=== Nuneaton Town ===
Having received offers from the Netherlands and England, Roos went on to join Conference Premier side Nuneaton Town on 8 November 2013, signing a contract until the end of the 2013–14 season. His "Boro" debut was delayed by almost two weeks as the club waited to receive international clearance. There were initial rumours and controversy over his debut, with led chief executive Ian Neale to deny that any pressure was placed on manager Kevin Wilkin to play Roos. His debut came on 23 November, in a 1–0 victory over Chester at Liberty Way, where he earned praise for a "fine" late save from a close-range Jason Jarrett strike. He played a total of nine league matches, keeping five clean sheets, and also played four cup matches, keeping three clean sheets, not conceding a goal in his first six appearances. His form drew the attention of Premier League club Liverpool, with whom he spent a week's trial in early January 2014, as well as Everton, Sunderland and Cardiff City. He also spent time training with Ipswich Town and Bolton Wanderers and was scouted by Crystal Palace, Queens Park Rangers and Bournemouth.

=== Derby County ===
Kelle has been outstanding since he has come in. He is developing really well and looks like he could be a good keeper... We felt because of Kelle we were in a position to release Adam Legzdins.

— Derby County first team coach Paul Simpson on Roos.

On 23 January 2014, Roos moved to Championship side Derby County after impressing during a trial. He signed a 2 1/2-year contract for an undisclosed fee, believed to be around £30,000 plus add-ons, including the requirement that Derby play a pre-season friendly with Nuneaton in the summer. He was installed as understudy to Lee Grant after the departure of goalkeeper Adam Legzdins, and started the 2014–15 season on the bench. He made his first-team debut for the "Rams" in a League Cup match against Reading at Pride Park Stadium on 23 September 2014. He made several saves and kept a clean sheet as Derby won 2–0. He played in Derby's next League Cup match, a 5–2 win over Fulham on 28 October, and also played three FA Cup matches as Derby recorded 1–0 and 2–0 wins over Southport and Chesterfield before Reading gained revenge by eliminating Derby from the FA Cup at the fifth round.

On 15 July 2015, Roos joined Championship rivals Rotherham United on a season-long loan deal, along with team-mate Farrend Rawson. However, he got off to a poor start with a 4–1 defeat to Milton Keynes Dons at the New York Stadium on 8 August, which led to heavy criticism from "Millers" fans on social media. Roos returned to Derby just six weeks into the loan period after conceding ten goals in his four appearances, leaving Rotherham bottom of the table. Manager Steve Evans stated that "at this minute in time his inconsistency is not something we could afford", and signed Lee Camp to replace him.

On 1 February 2016, Roos joined League Two side AFC Wimbledon on loan for the rest of the 2015–16 season. He made his debut for the "Dons" 12 days later in a 4–1 victory over Luton Town at Kingsmeadow. He quickly established himself in Neal Ardley's first-team and proved highly popular with supporters as he kept eight clean sheets in 20 appearances for the club. He helped the club achieve promotion to League One for the first time since their reformation, as he kept another clean sheet in a 2–0 victory over Plymouth Argyle in the League Two play-off final at Wembley Stadium, making an "excellent diving save" from a Graham Carey free kick when the game was still goalless.

On 24 August 2016, Roos signed with League One side Bristol Rovers on a season-long loan. He made his debut for the "Pirates" six days later in a 3–2 EFL Trophy defeat by Reading U23 at the Memorial Stadium. He made his league debut for the "Gas" on 10 September, in a 2–2 draw with Rochdale. However, he was dropped in December as manager Darrell Clarke decided to give Will Puddy a run in goal. He returned to Derby on 10 January 2017, having made 22 appearances in all competitions for Bristol Rovers.

On 16 September 2017, Roos returned to League Two on an emergency loan to Port Vale; the loan was approved as first-choice goalkeeper Rob Lainton was injured and manager Michael Brown did not have confidence in inexperienced duo Sam Hornby and Ryan Boot. He made his debut for the "Valiants" later that same day in a 1–1 draw with Forest Green Rovers at Vale Park, which proved to be Brown's last game as manager. Seven days later he spilled a routine cross to allow Yeovil Town the equalising goal in a 1–1 draw, but was backed by caretaker manager David Kelly, who said "he is a good presence for us and he will get over it". He played nine matches before he was forced to return to Derby after picking up an injury in October.

On 8 December 2017, he then joined League One side Plymouth Argyle on an emergency loan after injuries to Luke McCormick, Kyle Letheren and Robbert te Loeke. In doing so he was forced to cancel a planned trip back to the Netherlands to spend Christmas with his family. Roos played in four games for Argyle, going unbeaten and keeping one clean sheet before leaving Home Park on 28 December; Argyle signed Remi Matthews on loan from Norwich the day later.

With regular custodian Scott Carson out injured, Roos finally made his league debut for Derby on 19 January 2019, helping the "Rams" to 2–1 victory over Reading. Manager Frank Lampard said he then faced a "nice but difficult" selection decision between Roos and the returning Carson. He stuck with Roos until the end of the 2018–19 season, as Derby went on to reach the play-off final. Derby were beaten 2–1 by Aston Villa in the final, with Roos being at fault for the second Villa goal after misjudging a shot from Anwar El Ghazi to allow John McGinn to head the ball into an empty net. He signed a new three-year contract with Derby County at the end of the 2018–19 season.

Following some poor appearances, manager Phillip Cocu dropped Roos for Huddersfield Town loanee Ben Hamer after he conceded three goals at Fulham on 26 November 2019. He worked on his weaknesses with goalkeeping coach Shay Given and continued to play in the FA Cup. He volunteered money and time to charities during the COVID-19 pandemic in England.

Roos started Derby's first game of the 2020–21 season against Barrow, keeping a clean sheet in a 0–0 draw and then saving three penalties in the resultant shootout to help Derby advance to the next round of the EFL Cup. He competed with David Marshall for a first-team place, with new manager Wayne Rooney generally preferring the more experienced Marshall. He played on the final day of the season, a 3–3 draw with Sheffield Wednesday that was enough to keep Derby just above the relegation zone.

He was sent off for bringing down Sheffield United's Billy Sharp in a 1–0 away defeat on 25 September 2021. He lost this first-team place to Ryan Allsop in December, though remained on the bench ahead of Marshall. Roos played the final two games of the 2021–22 relegation season as Rooney wanted to reward him for his hard work in training.

=== Aberdeen ===
On 25 June 2022, Roos agreed to join Scottish Premiership team Aberdeen on a two-year contract upon the expiration of his contract at Derby County. Aberdeen manager Jim Goodwin said that Roos would compete with established number one Joe Lewis for the starting place. The team enjoyed a positive start to the 2022–23 campaign, sitting in third-place as the 2022 FIFA World Cup enforced winter break began. On 15 January, Roos tore his hamstring in the Scottish League Cup semi-final defeat to Rangers at Hampden Park and was sidelined for four months; fellow Dutchman Jay Gorter was signed on loan to replace him. He was returned to the starting eleven by new manager Barry Robson upon regaining his fitness. Speaking in May following a third-place finish in the league, Robson said that Roos was the best goalkeeper in the Premiership; Roos had kept 13 clean sheets and saved two penalties in his 31 league appearances. He played In the December 2023 League Cup final defeat to Rangers at Hampden Park. He returned to Hampden in the semi-final of the Scottish Cup, which ended in a penalty shootout defeat to Celtic. He said he would hold talks with new manager Jimmy Thelin after being linked with a move away from the club in the summer. However, his exit was confirmed at the end of June.

=== Triestina ===
On 18 July 2024, Roos joined Serie C side Triestina on a free transfer, signing a three-year deal with the Italian club, with an option for a further season if the club were promoted. He was reported to have been approached by Scottish club Hibernian during the January transfer window. He played 40 matches in the 2024–25 campaign and kept clean sheets in both relegation play-off games with Caldiero Terme.

=== Notts County ===
On 22 July 2025, Roos returned to England on a free transfer, joining League Two side Notts County on an initial two-year contract. He played poorly at Meadow Lane, leading manager Martin Paterson to admit that "I think we could bolster that area [goalkeeping]". On 15 January 2026, Roos joined Scottish Premiership club Kilmarnock on loan for the remainder of the 2025–26 season after Max Stryjek was sidelined following heart surgery. He gave away a winning goal on his debut, a 2–1 defeat to Dundee in the Scottish Cup. He remained first-choice at Rugby Park and said that the team were "moving in a great direction" under manager Neil McCann. On 11 April, he saved a stoppage-time penalty to secure a point against Dundee. On 2 September, Notts County announced the mutual termination of his contract.

== International career ==
While at PSV, Roos played for the Netherlands at under-15s, under-16s and under-17 levels.

== Personal life ==
Roos was accompanied by his partner Nadine Hanssen on his move to Aberdeen. Nadine decided to restart her football career with Aberdeen Women after the birth of their son Romeo in December 2021.

== Career statistics ==
As of match played on 11 April 2026

Appearances and goals by club, season and competition
Club	Season	League			National cup (Note: Includes FA Cup, Scottish Cup, Coppa Italia)		League cup (Note: Includes Football League Cup, Scottish League Cup)		Other		Total	
Club	Season	Division	Apps	Goals	Apps	Goals	Apps	Goals	Apps	Goals	Apps	Goals
Nuneaton Town	2013–14	Conference Premier	9	0	0	0	0	0	3 (Note: Appearances in the FA Trophy.)	0	12	0
Derby County	2013–14	Championship	0	0	—		—		0	0	0	0
Derby County	2014–15	Championship	0	0	3	0	2	0	—		5	0
Derby County	2015–16	Championship	0	0	0	0	0	0	—		0	0
Derby County	2016–17	Championship	0	0	0	0	0	0	—		0	0
Derby County	2017–18	Championship	0	0	0	0	0	0	—		0	0
Derby County	2018–19	Championship	16	0	4	0	1	0	3 (Note: Appearances in the play-offs.)	0	24	0
Derby County	2019–20	Championship	22	0	4	0	0	0	—		26	0
Derby County	2020–21	Championship	14	0	0	0	2	0	—		16	0
Derby County	2021–22	Championship	18	0	0	0	0	0	—		18	0
Derby County	Total		70	0	11	0	5	0	3	0	89	0
Rotherham United (loan)	2015–16	Championship	4	0	0	0	1	0	—		5	0
AFC Wimbledon (loan)	2015–16	League Two	17	0	—		—		3	0	20	0
Bristol Rovers (loan)	2016–17	League One	17	0	3	0	0	0	3 (Note: Appearances in the EFL Trophy.)	0	23	0
Port Vale (loan)	2017–18	League Two	8	0	0	0	—		1	0	9	0
Plymouth Argyle (loan)	2017–18	League One	4	0	—		—		—		4	0
Aberdeen	2022–23	Scottish Premiership	31	0	0	0	7	0	—		38	0
Aberdeen	2023–24	Scottish Premiership	37	0	3	0	4	0	8 (Note: 2 appearances in the UEFA Europa League and 6 appearances in the UEFA Conference League)	0	52	0
Aberdeen	Total		68	0	3	0	11	0	8	0	90	0
Triestina	2024–25	Serie C	38	0	0	0	0	0	2	0	40	0
Notts County	2025–26	League Two	24	0	1	0	1	0	0	0	26	0
Notts County	2026–27	League Two	0	0	0	0	0	0	0	0	0	0
Notts County	Total		24	0	1	0	1	0	0	0	26	0
Kilmarnock	2025–26	Scottish Premiership	11	0	1	0	—		—		12	0
Career total			270	0	19	0	18	0	23	0	330	0

== Honours ==
AFC Wimbledon

- Football League Two play-offs: 2016

Aberdeen

- Scottish League Cup runner-up: 2023–24
