= Moses Makasi =

English footballer (born 1995)

Personal information
- Full name: Kusu Moses Makasi
- Date of birth: 22 September 1995 (age 31)
- Place of birth: Lewisham, England
- Height: 1.80 m (5 ft 11 in)
- Position: Midfielder

Youth career
- West Ham United

Senior career*
Years	Team	Apps	(Gls)
2015–2019	West Ham United	0	(0)
2015	→ Chelmsford City (loan)	6	(0)
2018	→ Plymouth Argyle (loan)	7	(1)
2019	→ Stevenage (loan)	14	(0)
2019–2020	FC Eindhoven	24	(1)
2020–2021	Brage	49	(0)
- * Club domestic league appearances and goals as of 27 November 2021

Kusu Moses Makasi (born 22 September 1995) is an English professional footballer who plays as a midfielder.

== Career ==
Makasi signed his first professional contract with West Ham United in 2014. He spent time on loan at Chelmsford City in August and September 2015, making six league appearances. He signed a new contract with West Ham in May 2016.

Makasi began the 2017–18 season as captain of the U23 squad and scored in the EFL Trophy win over Swindon Town in August 2017. He was named on the bench for five first-team matches.

In January 2018 he joined Plymouth Argyle on loan for the remainder of the season. He made his first team debut on 13 February 2018, in a 4–2 home win against AFC Wimbledon, coming on as a substitute for Antoni Sarcevic. He scored his first goal for the club in his next game, his first start, in a 1–1 draw away at Fleetwood Town.

In total Makasi played seven league games for Argyle, scoring once. He returned to West Ham in April for cartilage surgery after a knee injury cut short his loan spell. In June 2018 he signed a new one-year contract with West Ham.

Makasi joined League Two club Stevenage on loan on 11 January 2019, signing for the remainder of the 2018–19 season.

Makasi was released by West Ham at the end of the 2018–19 season.

On 30 August 2019, Makasi joined Dutch club FC Eindhoven on a free transfer.

On 5 August 2020 he signed for Swedish club Brage.

== Personal life ==
Makasi was born in England and is of Nigerian descent.

== Career statistics ==
As of 6 March 2020

Appearances and goals by club, season and competition
Club	Season	League			FA Cup		League Cup		Other		Total	
Club	Season	Division	Apps	Goals	Apps	Goals	Apps	Goals	Apps	Goals	Apps	Goals
West Ham United	2015–16	Premier League	0	0	0	0	0	0	0	0	0	0
West Ham United	2016–17	Premier League	0	0	0	0	0	0	0	0	0	0
West Ham United	2017–18	Premier League	0	0	0	0	0	0	0	0	0	0
West Ham United	2018–19	Premier League	0	0	0	0	0	0	0	0	0	0
West Ham United	Total		0	0	0	0	0	0	0	0	0	0
Chelmsford City (loan)	2015–16	National League South	6	0	0	0	0	0	0	0	6	0
Plymouth Argyle (loan)	2017–18	League One	7	1	0	0	0	0	0	0	7	1
Stevenage (loan)	2018–19	League Two	14	0	0	0	0	0	0	0	14	0
FC Eindhoven	2019–20	Eerste Divisie	24	1	3	0	0	0	0	0	27	1
Brage	2020	Superettan	3	0	0	0	0	0	0	0	3	0
Career total			54	2	3	0	0	0	0	0	57	2
