= Alex Fletcher (footballer) =

English footballer

Personal information
- Full name: Alex Samuel Fletcher
- Date of birth: 9 February 1999 (age 27)
- Place of birth: Newton Abbot, England
- Height: 5 ft 10 in (1.79 m)
- Position: Forward

Youth career
- 2008–2016: Plymouth Argyle

Senior career*
Years	Team	Apps	(Gls)
2016–2020	Plymouth Argyle	19	(1)
2018	→ Torquay United (loan)	3	(0)
2019	→ Aldershot Town (loan)	6	(0)
2019–2020	→ Tiverton Town (loan)	11	(8)
2020–2021	Tiverton Town	7	(8)
2021–2023	Bath City	56	(23)
2023–2024	Weston-super-Mare	9	(1)
2024	→ Tiverton Town (loan)	10	(1)
Total		123	(42)
- * Club domestic league appearances and goals

Alex Samuel Fletcher (born 30 April 1999) is an English former professional footballer who played as a forward.

Fletcher played in the English Football League for Plymouth Argyle, and in non-league football for Torquay United, Aldershot Town, Tiverton Town, Bath City and Weston-super-Mare. Fletcher retired as player at the age of 25, having suffered a serious head injury while playing for Bath City the season before.

== Career ==
Fletcher, as an academy player, made his first team debut at home in the FA Cup in a 0–0 draw with Newport County, on as a 79th-minute substitute for Craig Tanner.

He signed a professional contract in the summer of 2017, and made his full debut in the EFL Trophy, in a group stage game vs Chelsea U-21s. Fletcher scored two goals in the last 2 minutes as Argyle came from behind to win on penalties.

Fletcher scored his first career league goal in a League One game, a 2–1 defeat to Fleetwood Town.

On 4 January 2018, Fletcher joined Torquay United, who were at the time bottom of the National League, on a 28-day loan. He went on to play just three times for Torquay, who did not take up the option to extend his spell.

On 3 September 2019, Fletcher joined Aldershot Town of the National League, initially on a one-month loan. On 7 December 2019 he joined Southern League club Tiverton Town F.C. on a month's loan deal. The deal was later extended for another 28 days and later to the end of the season. He re-joined Tiverton permanently at the start of the following season.

In January 2021, Fletcher joined Bath City for an undisclosed fee from Tiverton Town.

On 8 November 2022, Fletcher was critically injured when he crashed into advertising hoardings at the side of the pitch at Twerton Park; the fixture was abandoned soon afterwards. He was admitted into intensive care and underwent emergency neurosurgery. On 21 November 2022, Fletcher left intensive care. On 8 November 2023, Fletcher announced he had left Bath City and had taken up a role with the PFA to deliver education on improving brain health for teams in England. On 10 November 2023, fellow National League South side Weston-super-Mare announced the signing of Fletcher.

On 21 July 2024, Fletcher announced his retirement from football.

== Career statistics ==
Appearances and goals by club, season and competition
Club	Season	League			FA Cup		EFL Cup		Other		Total	
Club	Season	Division	Apps	Goals	Apps	Goals	Apps	Goals	Apps	Goals	Apps	Goals
Plymouth Argyle	2016–17	League Two	0	0	1	0	0	0	0	0	1	0
Plymouth Argyle	2017–18	League One	15	1	0	0	0	0	2 (Note: Appearances in EFL Trophy)	2	17	3
Plymouth Argyle	2018–19	League One	4	0	0	0	0	0	3	0	7	0
Plymouth Argyle	2019–20	League Two	0	0	0	0	0	0	0	0	0	0
Plymouth Argyle	Total		19	1	1	0	0	0	5	2	25	3
Torquay United (loan)	2017–18	National League	3	0	—		—		—		3	0
Aldershot Town (loan)	2019–20	National League	6	0	—		—		—		6	0
Tiverton Town (loan)	2019–20	Southern League; Premier Division South	11	8	—		—		—		11	8
Tiverton Town	2020–21	Southern League; Premier Division South	7	8	2	1	—		1 (Note: Appearance(s) in FA Trophy)	0	10	9
Bath City	2020–21	National League South	1	0	—		—		—		1	0
Bath City	2021–22	National League South	39	16	3	1	—		6 (Note: One appearance in FA Trophy, five appearances and two goals in Somerset Premier Cup)	2	48	19
Bath City	2022–23	National League South	16	7	3	2	—		1 (Note: Appearance in Somerset Premier Cup)	0	20	9
Bath City	2023–24	National League South	1	0	2	0	—		0	0	3	0
Bath City	Total		56	23	8	3	—		7	2	71	28
Weston-super-Mare	2023–24	National League South	11	1	—		—		3	1	14	2
Tiverton Town (loan)	2023–24	Southern League; Premier Division South	10	1	—		—		—		10	1
Career total			123	42	11	4	0	0	16	5	150	51
