= Remi Matthews =

English footballer

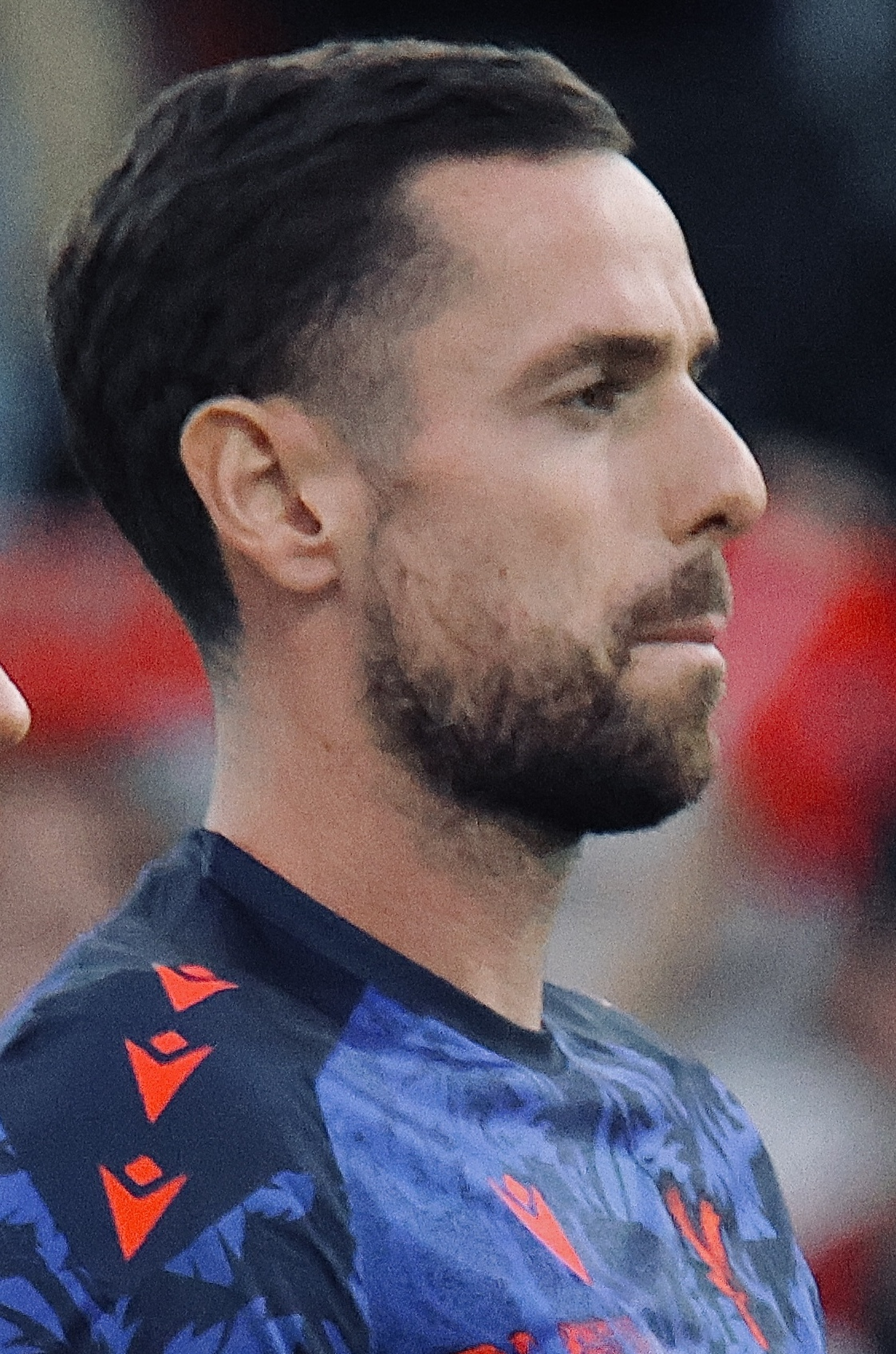
- Matthews in 2025

Personal information
- Full name: Remi Luke Matthews
- Date of birth: 10 February 1994 (age 32)
- Place of birth: Gorleston, England
- Height: 6 ft 0 in (1.84 m)
- Position: Goalkeeper

Team information
- Current team: Crystal Palace
- Number: 31

Youth career
- Norwich City

Senior career*
| Years | Team | Apps | (Gls) |
| 2014–2019 | Norwich City | 0 | (0) |
| 2014 | → Burton Albion (loan) | 0 | (0) |
| 2015–2016 | → Burton Albion (loan) | 2 | (0) |
| 2016 | → Doncaster Rovers (loan) | 9 | (0) |
| 2016–2017 | → Hamilton Academical (loan) | 17 | (0) |
| 2017 | → Plymouth Argyle (loan) | 6 | (0) |
| 2017–2018 | → Plymouth Argyle (loan) | 20 | (0) |
| 2018–2019 | → Bolton Wanderers (loan) | 3 | (0) |
| 2019–2020 | Bolton Wanderers | 48 | (0) |
| 2020–2021 | Sunderland | 6 | (0) |
| 2021– | Crystal Palace | 1 | (0) |
| 2022–2023 | → St Johnstone (loan) | 34 | (0) |
- * Club domestic league appearances and goals as of 14:20, 9 December 2023 (UTC)

Remi Luke Matthews (born 10 February 1994) is an English professional footballer who plays as a goalkeeper for Premier League club Crystal Palace.

Matthews began his career with Norwich City, but did not make a senior appearance. He was loaned to Scottish Premiership club Hamilton Academical and several English Football League teams, before joining Bolton Wanderers permanently in January 2019. In August the following year, he joined Sunderland on a one-year deal. In July 2021, Matthews signed for Crystal Palace on a two-year deal.

== Club career ==
=== Norwich City ===
Born in Gorleston, Norfolk, Matthews began his career at the academy of Norwich City. After an injury to their last loanee Chris Weale, Matthews was signed on a month-long loan by Burton Albion on 27 November 2014. Two days later, he was included in a matchday squad for the first time in his career, remaining an unused substitute in their 1–0 loss at Shrewsbury Town; this would happen four more times in his spell as he left without an appearance.

On 6 July 2015, Matthews returned to Burton on loan until the next January. A week later, he signed a new two-year contract at his parent club. He made his professional debut on 8 August, a 2–1 win against Scunthorpe United at the Pirelli Stadium in Burton's first ever League One match. They ended the season with a second promotion.

After six games in all competitions, Matthews returned to Norwich. On 24 March 2016 he went back to League One, joining Doncaster Rovers for the rest of the season. He made his debut the following day in a 4–1 loss at Colchester United, and totalled nine games for the team from the Keepmoat Stadium, who ended the campaign with relegation.

On 16 July 2016, Matthews joined Scottish Premiership club Hamilton Academical on a season-long loan, having signed a new two-year contract, with the option of another year at Norwich. He made his debut the same day, as Hamilton lost 2–1 to Ayr United in the Scottish League Cup.

On 20 October 2017, Matthews was signed by League One club Plymouth Argyle on an emergency loan as all three professional goalkeepers (Luke McCormick, Robbert te Loeke and Kyle Letheren) were out injured. He made his debut the next day in a 1–0 away win over AFC Wimbledon. Matthews returned to Norwich on 27 November after getting injured in a league game against Portsmouth.

On 29 December 2017, Matthews re-joined Plymouth on loan for a second time in the same season. Initially again on an emergency loan for just one game against Blackpool, it was extended in the January transfer window until the end of the season.

=== Bolton Wanderers ===
On 12 August 2018, Matthews joined Championship club Bolton Wanderers on an initial loan deal, with the move set to be made permanent in January 2019. However, on 5 January 2019, he returned to Norwich after the transfer fell through due to Bolton's transfer embargo. On 18 January, he joined on a permanent deal.

Matthews made his debut for Bolton on 14 August in a 2–1 loss at Leeds United in the first round of the EFL Cup. On 17 September 2019, Matthews kept a clean sheet in a 0–0 draw against Oxford United, making several crucial saves during the match. Bolton had been saved from liquidation only a few days before. Matthews assisted in gaining a much needed point for the side, only their second of a troubled League One campaign in 2019. On 26 June it was announced Matthews would be one of 14 senior players released at the end of his contract on 30 June.

=== Sunderland ===
Matthews joined Sunderland on 21 August 2020 on a one-year deal. On 25 May 2021 it was announced that Matthews would leave the club at the end of the season, following the expiration of his contract.

=== Crystal Palace and loan to St Johnstone ===
In July 2021, Matthews joined Premier League club Crystal Palace on a two-year contract.

Prior to the start of the 2022–23 season, Matthews was sent on a season-long loan to Scottish club St Johnstone. At the same time, he signed a one-year extension with Palace.

In July 2023, Matthews returned to Crystal Palace for the following season following the expiration of his loan deal with St Johnstone. On 9 December, he made his first appearance for the club and subsequent Premier League debut when he came on as a substitute replacing Sam Johnstone in a 2–1 home defeat against Liverpool.

On 5 June 2024, Crystal Palace said the player had agreed a one-year extension. One year later, the club announced Nathaniel Clyne and Matthews had both signed new contracts, with the latter signing a new two-year deal.

== Career statistics ==
As of match played 9 December 2023

Appearances and goals by club, season and competition
| Club | Season | League | | | National cup (Note: Includes FA Cup, Scottish Cup) | | League cup (Note: Includes Football League/EFL Cup, Scottish League Cup) | | Europe | | Other | | Total | |
| Club | Season | Division | Apps | Goals | Apps | Goals | Apps | Goals | Apps | Goals | Apps | Goals | Apps | Goals |
|---|---|---|---|---|---|---|---|---|---|---|---|---|---|---|
| Norwich City | 2014–15 | Championship | 0 | 0 | 0 | 0 | 0 | 0 | — | | 0 | 0 | 0 | 0 |
| Norwich City | 2018–19 | Championship | 0 | 0 | 0 | 0 | 0 | 0 | — | | — | | 0 | 0 |
| Norwich City | Total | | 0 | 0 | 0 | 0 | 0 | 0 | — | | 0 | 0 | 0 | 0 |
| Burton Albion (loan) | 2014–15 | League Two | 0 | 0 | — | | — | | — | | — | | 0 | 0 |
| Burton Albion (loan) | 2015–16 | League One | 2 | 0 | 1 | 0 | 2 | 0 | — | | 1 (Note: Appearance(s) in the EFL Trophy) | 0 | 6 | 0 |
| Doncaster Rovers (loan) | 2015–16 | League One | 9 | 0 | — | | — | | — | | — | | 9 | 0 |
| Hamilton Academical (loan) | 2016–17 | Scottish Premiership | 17 | 0 | 3 | 0 | 5 | 0 | — | | 2 (Note: Appearances in the Scottish Premiership relegation play-offs) | 0 | 27 | 0 |
| Plymouth Argyle (loan) | 2017–18 | League One | 26 | 0 | 1 | 0 | 0 | 0 | — | | 0 | 0 | 27 | 0 |
| Bolton Wanderers | 2018–19 | Championship | 18 | 0 | 1 | 0 | 1 | 0 | — | | — | | 20 | 0 |
| Bolton Wanderers | 2019–20 | League One | 33 | 0 | 1 | 0 | 1 | 0 | — | | 3 | 0 | 38 | 0 |
| Bolton Wanderers | Total | | 51 | 0 | 2 | 0 | 2 | 0 | — | | 3 | 0 | 58 | 0 |
| Sunderland | 2020–21 | League One | 6 | 0 | 1 | 0 | 0 | 0 | — | | 4 | 0 | 11 | 0 |
| Crystal Palace | 2021–22 | Premier League | 0 | 0 | 0 | 0 | 0 | 0 | — | | — | | 0 | 0 |
| Crystal Palace | 2023–24 | Premier League | 1 | 0 | 0 | 0 | 0 | 0 | — | | — | | 1 | 0 |
| Crystal Palace | 2024–25 | Premier League | 0 | 0 | 0 | 0 | 0 | 0 | — | | — | | 0 | 0 |
| Crystal Palace | 2025–26 | Premier League | 0 | 0 | 0 | 0 | 0 | 0 | 0 | 0 | 0 | 0 | 0 | 0 |
| Crystal Palace | 2026–27 | Premier League | 0 | 0 | 0 | 0 | 0 | 0 | 0 | 0 | — | | 0 | 0 |
| Crystal Palace | Total | | 1 | 0 | 0 | 0 | 0 | 0 | 0 | 0 | 0 | 0 | 1 | 0 |
| St Johnstone (loan) | 2022–23 | Scottish Premiership | 34 | 0 | 1 | 0 | — | | — | | — | | 35 | 0 |
| Career total | | | 146 | 0 | 9 | 0 | 9 | 0 | 0 | 0 | 11 | 0 | 175 | 0 |

== Honours ==
Sunderland

- EFL Trophy: 2020–21

Crystal Palace

- UEFA Conference League: 2025–26
