= Jamie Ness =

Scottish association football player

Personal information
- Date of birth: 2 March 1991 (age 35)
- Place of birth: Irvine, Scotland
- Height: 5 ft 10 in (1.77 m)
- Position: Central midfielder

Youth career
- 2007–2010: Rangers

Senior career*
Years	Team	Apps	(Gls)
2010–2012	Rangers	16	(1)
2012–2015	Stoke City	0	(0)
2014	→ Leyton Orient (loan)	13	(1)
2014–2015	→ Crewe Alexandra (loan)	33	(2)
2015–2017	Scunthorpe United	39	(0)
2017–2019	Plymouth Argyle	51	(3)
2019–2020	Dundee	8	(1)
2021–2022	Forfar Athletic	6	(1)
Total		166	(9)

International career
2007–2008	Scotland U17	9	(0)
2008–2010	Scotland U19	9	(1)
2010–2012	Scotland U21	2	(0)
- * Club domestic league appearances and goals as of 00:57, 7 March 2023 (UTC)

Jamie Ness (born 2 March 1991) is a Scottish former professional footballer who played as a midfielder.

Ness began his career with Rangers and made his debut for the first team in January 2011. He then scored against Celtic in the Scottish Cup but his progress was hampered by injuries. In 2012, he became a free agent and joined Stoke City. He failed to make an impression with Stoke and spent time out on loan with Leyton Orient and Crewe Alexandra. Ness joined Scunthorpe United in July 2015 on a free transfer. He spent two years with the Iron before joining Plymouth Argyle in June 2017. In 2019 he signed for Scottish Championship side Dundee. Ness would retire in 2022 following a season with Forfar Athletic.

== Career ==
=== Rangers ===
Ness made his first Rangers appearance in a pre-season friendly against Portsmouth and was predicted to have a bright future. Due to injuries he did not make his league debut until 26 December 2010, away to Motherwell, coming on as a substitute in the 4–1 win. On 2 January 2011, Ness made his full debut in an Old Firm derby which Rangers lost 2–0. On 6 February 2011, he scored his first Rangers goal with a stunning long-range strike in the third minute of a fifth round Scottish Cup match, at home to Celtic. He signed a two-year extension to his contract which was to the summer of 2013, but was later extended by a further two years until 2015.

Prior to the start of the 2011–12 season, Ness and his teammate Gregg Wylde were issued with first team squad numbers by Rangers manager Ally McCoist. Ness missed most of the 2011–12 season due to injury playing just five matches for Rangers and scored his first league goal in a 5–0 win over Dundee United on 2 May 2012.

In June 2012, a new company was formed which purchased the assets and history of Rangers as the old company entered liquidation proceedings. Ness lodged an objection against his contract being transferred to the new company. PFA Scotland had previously commented that players were entitled to become free agents if they objected to the transfer. Ness had raised a constructive dismissal claim against Rangers.

=== Stoke City ===
Ness signed a four-year contract with Premier League side Stoke City on 3 July 2012. It took a while until he was granted international clearance by FIFA due to contract dispute with Rangers but he made his first appearance in a Stoke shirt in a pre-season match against Columbus Crew on 24 July 2012. He made his competitive debut for Stoke against Swindon Town in the Football League Cup but he failed to finish the match after suffering an injury.

On 3 January 2014, Ness joined Leyton Orient on a 28-day loan. On 11 January he scored his first goal in English football on his home debut for the club in a 4–0 win over Carlisle United. On 14 August 2014 Ness joined Crewe Alexandra on loan until 1 January 2015. He extended his loan until the end of the 2014–15 season. He played 34 times for the Alex helping them avoid relegation.

=== Scunthorpe United ===
Ness joined Scunthorpe United on a free transfer on 10 July 2015. In May 2017 it was announced that Ness would be leaving the club at the end of his contract, after two years with the club.

=== Plymouth Argyle ===
Ness joined Plymouth Argyle in June 2017. He was released by Plymouth Argyle at the end of the 2018–19 season.

=== Dundee ===
Ness signed a two-year contract for Dundee in June 2019, with the option for a further year. His season was plagued with ankle and calf injuries, keeping him out for the majority of the time. Ness grabbed his first Dundee goal on 1 November 2019, scoring a late winner against Morton. Ness left the club by mutual consent in October 2020.

=== Forfar Athletic ===
After spending a year away from the game and trialling during preseason with Scottish Premiership side Motherwell, Ness returned to football with Scottish League Two side Forfar Athletic in August 2021. Ness would open his scoring tally for the Loons with a late winner away to Stranraer. On 22 June 2022, Ness would announce his retirement from football.

== Personal life ==
Ness grew up supporting Rangers and English club Manchester United and he cites Danny Wilson as his best friend in football. In November 2012, Ness and his girlfriend Heather Weir were saved from carbon monoxide poisoning by their pet Labrador which had been acting strangely.

== Career statistics ==
=== Club ===
Appearances and goals by club, season and competition
Club	Season	League			National cup (Note: Includes Scottish Cup and FA Cup)		League cup (Note: Includes Scottish League Cup and EFL Cup)		Other		Total	
Club	Season	Division	Apps	Goals	Apps	Goals	Apps	Goals	Apps	Goals	Apps	Goals
Rangers	2010–11	Scottish Premier League	11	0	2	1	0	0	0	0	13	1
Rangers	2011–12	Scottish Premier League	5	1	0	0	0	0	0	0	5	1
Rangers	Total		16	1	2	1	0	0	0	0	18	2
Stoke City	2012–13	Premier League	0	0	0	0	1	0	—		1	0
Stoke City	2013–14	Premier League	0	0	0	0	0	0	—		0	0
Stoke City	2014–15	Premier League	0	0	0	0	0	0	—		0	0
Stoke City	Total		0	0	0	0	1	0	—		1	0
Leyton Orient (loan)	2013–14	League One	13	1	1	0	—		0	0	14	1
Crewe Alexandra (loan)	2014–15	League One	34	2	1	0	0	0	0	0	35	2
Scunthorpe United	2015–16	League One	27	0	3	0	0	0	0	0	30	0
Scunthorpe United	2016–17	League One	12	0	0	0	1	0	4 (Note: Two appearances in EFL Trophy; Two appearances in League One play-offs)	0	17	0
Scunthorpe United	Total		39	0	3	0	1	0	4	0	47	0
Plymouth Argyle	2017–18	League One	27	3	0	0	0	0	2 (Note: Appearance(s) in EFL Trophy)	0	29	3
Plymouth Argyle	2018–19	League One	24	0	2	0	2	1	2	0	30	1
Plymouth Argyle	Total		51	3	2	0	2	1	4	0	59	4
Dundee	2019–20	Scottish Championship	8	1	1	0	3	0	1 (Note: Appearance(s) in Scottish Challenge Cup)	0	13	1
Forfar Athletic	2021–22	Scottish League Two	6	1	1	0	0	0	1	0	8	1
Career total			167	9	11	1	7	1	10	0	195	11

== Honours ==
Rangers

- Scottish Premier League: 2010–11

Individual

- Scottish Premier League Young Player of the Month: January 2010
