= 2017–18 Plymouth Argyle F.C. season =

English football club season

Plymouth Argyle
2017–18 season
- Chairman: James Brent
- Manager: Derek Adams
- Stadium: Home Park
- League One: 7th
- FA Cup: Second round (knocked out by Bradford)
- EFL Cup: First round (knocked out by Bristol City)
- EFL Trophy: Knocked out at Group Stage
- Top goalscorer: League: Graham Carey (14); All: Graham Carey (16)
- Highest home attendance: 14,634 vs. Portsmouth (14 April 2018)
- Lowest home attendance: League: 7,411 vs. Blackpool (12 September 2017); All: 3,800 vs. Exeter (3 October 2017)
- Average home league attendance: 10,413
| Home colours | Away colours |

The 2017–18 season was Plymouth Argyle's first season back in League One since the 2010–11 season, following their promotion from League Two and their 132nd year in existence. Along with competing in League One, the club participated in the FA Cup, EFL Cup and EFL Trophy. The season covers the period from 1 July 2017 to 30 June 2018.

== First-Team squad ==
As of 7 May 2018

| No. | Name | Pos. | Nat. | Place of birth | Age | Apps | Goals | Signed from | Date signed | Fee | Ends |
Goalkeepers
| 1 | Robbert te Loeke | GK | (Netherlands) | Arnhem | 37 | 2 | 0 | Achilles '29 | 1 July 2017 | Free | Undisclosed |
| 23 | Luke McCormick | GK | (England) | Coventry | 42 | 345 | 0 | Oxford United | 9 May 2013 | Free | Undisclosed |
| 25 | Kyle Letheren | GK | (Wales) | Llanelli | 38 | 8 | 0 | York City | 5 September 2017 | Free | Undisclosed |
| 31 | Michael Cooper | GK | (England) | Exeter | 26 | 1 | 0 | Academy | 1 July 2017 | Trainee | Undisclosed |
| 34 | Remi Matthews | GK | (England) | Gorleston | 32 | 28 | 0 | Norwich City | 20 October 2017 | Loan | 30 June 2018 |
Defenders
| 2 | Gary Miller | RB | (Scotland) | Glasgow | 39 | 56 | 0 | Partick Thistle | 23 June 2016 | Free | Undisclosed |
| 3 | Gary Sawyer | LB | (England) | Bideford | 40 | 228 | 6 | Leyton Orient | 25 June 2015 | Free | Undisclosed |
| 5 | Ryan Edwards | CB | (England) | Liverpool | 32 | 30 | 4 | Morecambe | 1 July 2017 | Undisclosed | Undisclosed |
| 15 | Sonny Bradley | CB | (England) | Kingston upon Hull | 34 | 96 | 11 | Crawley Town | 11 July 2016 | Free | Undisclosed |
| 17 | Aaron Taylor-Sinclair | LB | (Scotland) | Aberdeen | 35 | 29 | 0 | Doncaster Rovers | 1 July 2017 | Free | Undisclosed |
| 18 | Oscar Threlkeld | RB | (England) | Bolton | 31 | 97 | 3 | Bolton Wanderers | 1 July 2016 | Free | Undisclosed |
| 22 | Zak Vyner | CB | (England) | London | 29 | 18 | 1 | Bristol City | 18 January 2018 | Loan | 30 June 2018 |
| 26 | Jordan Bentley | DF | (England) | Plymouth | 27 | 2 | 0 | Academy | 4 March 2016 | Trainee | Undisclosed |
Midfielders
| 4 | Yann Songo'o | DM | (Cameroon) (France) | Toulon | 34 | 93 | 2 | Free agent | 19 June 2016 | Free | Undisclosed |
| 6 | Jamie Ness | CM | (Scotland) | Irvine | 35 | 30 | 3 | Scunthorpe United | 1 July 2017 | Free | Undisclosed |
| 7 | Antoni Sarcevic | CM | (England) | Manchester | 34 | 52 | 5 | Shrewsbury Town | 26 January 2017 | Free | Undisclosed |
| 10 | Graham Carey | AM | (Republic of Ireland) | Blanchardstown | 37 | 149 | 43 | Ross County | 2 July 2015 | Free | Undisclosed |
| 11 | Rúben Lameiras | AM | (Portugal) | Lisbon | 31 | 38 | 6 | Coventry City | 1 July 2017 | Free | Undisclosed |
| 14 | Moses Makasi | CM | (England) | London | 30 | 8 | 1 | West Ham | 31 January 2018 | Loan | 30 June 2018 |
| 24 | David Fox | CM | (England) | Leek | 42 | 96 | 3 | Colchester United | 22 July 2016 | Free | Undisclosed |
| 30 | Paul Paton | DM | (Northern Ireland) (Scotland) | Paisley | 39 | 3 | 0 | Free agent | 13 March 2018 | Free | Undisclosed |
| 32 | Cameron Sangster | CM | (England) | Newton Abbot | 26 | 2 | 0 | Academy | 1 July 2016 | Trainee | Undisclosed |
Forwards
| 8 | Lionel Ainsworth | RW | (England) | Nottingham | 38 | 24 | 0 | Motherwell | 1 July 2017 | Free | Undisclosed |
| 9 | Simon Church | CF | (Wales) (England) | Amersham | 37 | 2 | 0 | Scunthorpe United | 19 January 2018 | Free | Undisclosed |
| 16 | Joel Grant | LW | (Jamaica) | Acton | 38 | 35 | 6 | Exeter City | 1 July 2017 | Free | Undisclosed |
| 19 | Ryan Taylor | CF | (England) | Rotherham | 38 | 42 | 10 | Oxford United | 30 January 2017 | Free | Undisclosed |
| 27 | Alex Fletcher | CF | (England) | Newton Abbot | 27 | 18 | 3 | Academy | 22 June 2017 | Trainee | Undisclosed |
| 37 | Alex Battle | LW | (England) | Plymouth | 27 | 1 | 0 | Academy | 1 July 2016 | Trainee | Undisclosed |
Out on Loan
| 13 | Nathan Blissett | CF | (England) | West Bromwich | 35 | 25 | 4 | Torquay United | 5 January 2017 | £15,000 | Undisclosed |
| 21 | Gregg Wylde | LW | (Scotland) | Kirkintilloch | 35 | 64 | 8 | Millwall | 1 July 2017 | Free | Undisclosed |

== Statistics ==
As of 7 May 2018

| No. | Pos | Nat | Player | Total | | League One | | FA Cup | | League Cup | | League Trophy | |
| No. | Pos | Nat | Player | Apps | Goals | Apps | Goals | Apps | Goals | Apps | Goals | Apps | Goals |
|---|---|---|---|---|---|---|---|---|---|---|---|---|---|
| 1 | GK | (Netherlands) NED | Robbert te Loeke | 2 | 0 | 0+0 | 0 | 0+0 | 0 | 1+0 | 0 | 1+0 | 0 |
| 2 | DF | (England) ENG | Gary Miller | 18 | 0 | 11+4 | 0 | 0+0 | 0 | 1+0 | 0 | 2+0 | 0 |
| 3 | DF | (England) ENG | Gary Sawyer | 49 | 1 | 46+0 | 1 | 2+0 | 0 | 0+0 | 0 | 1+0 | 0 |
| 4 | MF | (Cameroon) CMR | Yann Songo'o | 39 | 0 | 24+9 | 0 | 2+0 | 0 | 1+0 | 0 | 3+0 | 0 |
| 5 | DF | (England) ENG | Ryan Edwards | 30 | 4 | 25+0 | 3 | 2+0 | 0 | 0+1 | 0 | 2+0 | 1 |
| 6 | MF | (Scotland) SCO | Jamie Ness | 29 | 3 | 26+1 | 3 | 0+0 | 0 | 0+0 | 0 | 2+0 | 0 |
| 7 | MF | (England) ENG | Antoni Sarcevic | 35 | 3 | 25+5 | 3 | 0+1 | 0 | 0+1 | 0 | 3+0 | 0 |
| 8 | FW | (England) ENG | Lionel Ainsworth | 24 | 0 | 3+16 | 0 | 0+2 | 0 | 1+0 | 0 | 1+1 | 0 |
| 9 | FW | (Wales) WAL | Simon Church | 2 | 0 | 0+2 | 0 | 0+0 | 0 | 0+0 | 0 | 0+0 | 0 |
| 10 | MF | (Republic of Ireland) IRL | Graham Carey | 48 | 16 | 42+0 | 14 | 2+0 | 2 | 1+0 | 0 | 2+1 | 0 |
| 11 | MF | (Portugal) POR | Rúben Lameiras | 37 | 6 | 25+9 | 6 | 0+0 | 0 | 1+0 | 0 | 1+1 | 0 |
| 13 | FW | (England) ENG | Nathan Blissett | 16 | 2 | 6+7 | 1 | 0+0 | 0 | 1+0 | 0 | 1+1 | 1 |
| 14 | MF | (England) ENG | Moses Makasi | 7 | 1 | 6+1 | 1 | 0+0 | 0 | 0+0 | 0 | 0+0 | 0 |
| 15 | DF | (England) ENG | Sonny Bradley | 44 | 4 | 39+1 | 4 | 2+0 | 0 | 1+0 | 0 | 1+0 | 0 |
| 16 | FW | (Jamaica) JAM | Joel Grant | 35 | 6 | 24+9 | 6 | 2+0 | 0 | 0+0 | 0 | 0+0 | 0 |
| 17 | DF | (Scotland) SCO | Aaron Taylor-Sinclair | 29 | 0 | 10+14 | 0 | 2+0 | 0 | 1+0 | 0 | 2+0 | 0 |
| 18 | DF | (England) ENG | Oscar Threlkeld | 26 | 0 | 24+0 | 0 | 0+0 | 0 | 0+1 | 0 | 1+0 | 0 |
| 19 | FW | (England) ENG | Ryan Taylor | 23 | 6 | 21+0 | 5 | 0+1 | 0 | 0+0 | 0 | 1+0 | 1 |
| 21 | FW | (Scotland) SCO | Gregg Wylde | 13 | 1 | 2+7 | 1 | 0+0 | 0 | 1+0 | 0 | 2+1 | 0 |
| 22 | DF | (England) ENG | Zak Vyner | 17 | 1 | 17+0 | 1 | 0+0 | 0 | 0+0 | 0 | 0+0 | 0 |
| 23 | GK | (England) ENG | Luke McCormick | 10 | 0 | 9+0 | 0 | 1+0 | 0 | 0+0 | 0 | 0+0 | 0 |
| 24 | MF | (England) ENG | David Fox | 48 | 1 | 42+3 | 1 | 2+0 | 0 | 0+0 | 0 | 0+1 | 0 |
| 25 | GK | (Wales) WAL | Kyle Letheren | 8 | 0 | 7+0 | 0 | 0+0 | 0 | 0+0 | 0 | 1+0 | 0 |
| 27 | FW | (England) ENG | Alex Fletcher | 16 | 3 | 3+11 | 1 | 0+0 | 0 | 0+0 | 0 | 2+0 | 2 |
| 30 | MF | (Northern Ireland) NIR | Paul Paton | 3 | 0 | 1+2 | 0 | 0+0 | 0 | 0+0 | 0 | 0+0 | 0 |
| 31 | GK | (England) ENG | Michael Cooper | 1 | 0 | 0+1 | 0 | 0+0 | 0 | 0+0 | 0 | 0+0 | 0 |
| 33 | MF | (England) ENG | Cameron Sangster | 2 | 0 | 0+2 | 0 | 0+0 | 0 | 0+0 | 0 | 0+0 | 0 |
| 34 | GK | (England) ENG | Remi Matthews | 27 | 0 | 26+0 | 0 | 1+0 | 0 | 0+0 | 0 | 0+0 | 0 |
| 37 | MF | (England) ENG | Alex Battle | 1 | 0 | 0+1 | 0 | 0+0 | 0 | 0+0 | 0 | 0+0 | 0 |
Player(s) who left the club:
| 9 | FW | (Turkey) TUR | Nadir Çiftçi | 8 | 0 | 6+1 | 0 | 0+0 | 0 | 0+0 | 0 | 0+1 | 0 |
| 14 | FW | (England) ENG | Jake Jervis | 28 | 4 | 17+7 | 4 | 2+0 | 0 | 0+0 | 0 | 1+1 | 0 |
| 20 | DF | (Czech Republic) CZE | Jakub Sokolík | 5 | 0 | 0+2 | 0 | 0+0 | 0 | 1+0 | 0 | 2+0 | 0 |
| 29 | GK | (Netherlands) NED | Kelle Roos | 4 | 0 | 4+0 | 0 | 0+0 | 0 | 0+0 | 0 | 0+0 | 0 |
| 32 | MF | (France) FRA | Toumani Diagouraga | 17 | 3 | 15+0 | 3 | 2+0 | 0 | 0+0 | 0 | 0+0 | 0 |
| 35 | GK | (England) ENG | Will Mannion | 1 | 0 | 0+0 | 0 | 0+0 | 0 | 0+0 | 0 | 1+0 | 0 |

=== Goals record ===
As of 7 May 2018

| Rank | No. | Nat. | Po. | Name | League One | FA Cup | League Cup | League Trophy | Total |
|---|---|---|---|---|---|---|---|---|---|
| 1 | 10 | (Republic of Ireland) | AM | Graham Carey | 14 | 2 | 0 | 0 | 16 |
| 2 | 11 | (Portugal) | AM | Rúben Lameiras | 6 | 0 | 0 | 0 | 6 |
| 2 | 16 | (Jamaica) | LW | Joel Grant | 6 | 0 | 0 | 0 | 6 |
| 2 | 19 | (England) | CF | Ryan Taylor | 5 | 0 | 0 | 1 | 6 |
| 5 | 14 | (England) | RW | Jake Jervis | 4 | 0 | 0 | 0 | 4 |
| 5 | 15 | (England) | CB | Sonny Bradley | 4 | 0 | 0 | 0 | 4 |
| 5 | 5 | (England) | CB | Ryan Edwards | 3 | 0 | 0 | 1 | 4 |
| 8 | 6 | (Scotland) | CM | Jamie Ness | 3 | 0 | 0 | 0 | 3 |
| 8 | 7 | (England) | CM | Antoni Sarcevic | 3 | 0 | 0 | 0 | 3 |
| 8 | 32 | (France) | CM | Toumani Diagouraga | 3 | 0 | 0 | 0 | 3 |
| 8 | 27 | (England) | CF | Alex Fletcher | 1 | 0 | 0 | 2 | 3 |
| 12 | 13 | (England) | CF | Nathan Blissett | 1 | 0 | 0 | 1 | 2 |
| 13 | 3 | (England) | LB | Gary Sawyer | 1 | 0 | 0 | 0 | 1 |
| 13 | 14 | (England) | CM | Moses Makasi | 1 | 0 | 0 | 0 | 1 |
| 13 | 21 | (Scotland) | LW | Gregg Wylde | 1 | 0 | 0 | 0 | 1 |
| 13 | 22 | (England) | CB | Zak Vyner | 1 | 0 | 0 | 0 | 1 |
| 13 | 24 | (England) | CM | David Fox | 1 | 0 | 0 | 0 | 1 |
| Total | | | | | 58 | 2 | 0 | 5 | 65 |

=== Disciplinary record ===
As of 7 May 2018

| Rank | No. | Nat. | Po. | Name | League One | | | FA Cup | | | League Cup | | | League Trophy | | | Total | | |
| Rank | No. | Nat. | Po. | Name | Booked | (yellow card) (yellow-red card) | Sent off (straight red) | Booked | (yellow card) (yellow-red card) | Sent off (straight red) | Booked | (yellow card) (yellow-red card) | Sent off (straight red) | Booked | (yellow card) (yellow-red card) | Sent off (straight red) | Booked | (yellow card) (yellow-red card) | Sent off (straight red) |
|---|---|---|---|---|---|---|---|---|---|---|---|---|---|---|---|---|---|---|---|
| 1 | 10 | (Republic of Ireland) | AM | Graham Carey | 7 | 0 | 1 | 1 | 0 | 0 | 0 | 0 | 0 | 1 | 0 | 0 | 9 | 0 | 1 |
| 2 | 5 | (England) | CB | Ryan Edwards | 4 | 1 | 1 | 0 | 0 | 0 | 0 | 0 | 0 | 0 | 0 | 0 | 4 | 1 | 1 |
| 3 | 19 | (England) | CF | Ryan Taylor | 5 | 0 | 0 | 0 | 0 | 0 | 0 | 0 | 0 | 0 | 0 | 0 | 5 | 0 | 0 |
| 3 | 6 | (Scotland) | CM | Jamie Ness | 5 | 0 | 0 | 0 | 0 | 0 | 0 | 0 | 0 | 0 | 0 | 0 | 5 | 0 | 0 |
| 3 | 24 | (England) | CM | David Fox | 5 | 0 | 0 | 0 | 0 | 0 | 0 | 0 | 0 | 0 | 0 | 0 | 5 | 0 | 0 |
| 3 | 4 | (Cameroon) | DM | Yann Songo'o | 5 | 0 | 0 | 0 | 0 | 0 | 0 | 0 | 0 | 0 | 0 | 0 | 5 | 0 | 0 |
| 3 | 2 | (England) | RB | Gary Miller | 4 | 0 | 1 | 0 | 0 | 0 | 0 | 0 | 0 | 0 | 0 | 0 | 4 | 0 | 1 |
| 8 | 3 | (England) | LB | Gary Sawyer | 3 | 0 | 0 | 0 | 0 | 0 | 0 | 0 | 0 | 0 | 0 | 0 | 3 | 0 | 0 |
| 8 | 17 | (Scotland) | LB | Aaron Taylor-Sinclair | 3 | 0 | 0 | 0 | 0 | 0 | 0 | 0 | 0 | 0 | 0 | 0 | 3 | 0 | 0 |
| 8 | 7 | (England) | CM | Antoni Sarcevic | 2 | 0 | 1 | 0 | 0 | 0 | 0 | 0 | 0 | 0 | 0 | 0 | 2 | 0 | 1 |
| 8 | 11 | (Portugal) | LW | Rúben Lameiras | 2 | 0 | 0 | 0 | 0 | 0 | 0 | 0 | 0 | 1 | 0 | 0 | 3 | 0 | 0 |
| 8 | 15 | (England) | CB | Sonny Bradley | 1 | 0 | 1 | 0 | 0 | 0 | 0 | 0 | 0 | 1 | 0 | 0 | 2 | 0 | 1 |
| 13 | 32 | (France) | CM | Toumani Diagouraga | 2 | 0 | 0 | 0 | 0 | 0 | 0 | 0 | 0 | 0 | 0 | 0 | 2 | 0 | 0 |
| 14 | — | (England) | RW | Jake Jervis | 1 | 0 | 0 | 0 | 0 | 0 | 0 | 0 | 0 | 0 | 0 | 0 | 1 | 0 | 0 |
| 14 | 14 | (England) | CM | Moses Makasi | 1 | 0 | 0 | 0 | 0 | 0 | 0 | 0 | 0 | 0 | 0 | 0 | 1 | 0 | 0 |
| 14 | 16 | (Jamaica) | LW | Joel Grant | 1 | 0 | 0 | 0 | 0 | 0 | 0 | 0 | 0 | 0 | 0 | 0 | 1 | 0 | 0 |
| 14 | 18 | (England) | RB | Oscar Threlkeld | 0 | 0 | 0 | 0 | 0 | 0 | 0 | 0 | 0 | 1 | 0 | 0 | 1 | 0 | 0 |
| 14 | 20 | (Czech Republic) | CB | Jakub Sokolík | 1 | 0 | 0 | 0 | 0 | 0 | 0 | 0 | 0 | 0 | 0 | 0 | 1 | 0 | 0 |
| 14 | 30 | (Northern Ireland) | DM | Paul Paton | 1 | 0 | 0 | 0 | 0 | 0 | 0 | 0 | 0 | 0 | 0 | 0 | 1 | 0 | 0 |
| 14 | 34 | (England) | GK | Remi Matthews | 1 | 0 | 0 | 0 | 0 | 0 | 0 | 0 | 0 | 0 | 0 | 0 | 1 | 0 | 0 |
| 14 | 22 | (England) | CB | Zak Vyner | 1 | 0 | 0 | 0 | 0 | 0 | 0 | 0 | 0 | 0 | 0 | 0 | 1 | 0 | 0 |
| Total | | | | | 55 | 1 | 5 | 1 | 0 | 0 | 0 | 0 | 0 | 4 | 0 | 0 | 58 | 1 | 5 |

== Transfers ==
=== Transfers in ===
| Date | Position | Nationality | Name | From | Fee | Ref. |
|---|---|---|---|---|---|---|
| 1 July 2017 | RW | (England) | Lionel Ainsworth | Motherwell | Free | |
| 1 July 2017 | CB | (England) | Ryan Edwards | Morecambe | Undisclosed | |
| 1 July 2017 | LW | (Jamaica) | Joel Grant | Exeter City | Free | |
| 1 July 2017 | AM | (Portugal) | Rúben Lameiras | Coventry City | Free | |
| 1 July 2017 | CM | (Scotland) | Jamie Ness | Scunthorpe United | Free | |
| 1 July 2017 | LB | (Scotland) | Aaron Taylor-Sinclair | Doncaster Rovers | Free | |
| 1 July 2017 | GK | (Netherlands) | Robbert te Loeke | Achilles '29 | Free | |
| 1 July 2017 | LW | (Scotland) | Gregg Wylde | Millwall | Free | |
| 5 September 2017 | GK | (Wales) | Kyle Letheren | York City | Free | |
| 9 October 2017 | CM | (France) | Toumani Diagouraga | Leeds United | Free | |
| 19 January 2018 | CF | (Wales) | Simon Church | Scunthorpe United | Free | |
| 13 March 2018 | DM | (Northern Ireland) | Paul Paton | St Johnstone | Free | |

=== Transfers out ===
| Date | Position | Nationality | Name | To | Fee | Ref. |
|---|---|---|---|---|---|---|
| 1 July 2017 | CF | (England) | Ryan Brunt | Exeter City | Released | |
| 1 July 2017 | CB | (Latvia) | Nauris Bulvītis | FK Ventspils | Released | |
| 1 July 2017 | DM | (England) | Jack Calver | Free agent | Released | |
| 1 July 2017 | AM | (England) | Ryan Donaldson | Hartlepool United | Released | |
| 1 July 2017 | GK | (France) | Vincent Dorel | Torquay United | Released | |
| 1 July 2017 | MF | (England) | David Ijaha | Wealdstone | Released | |
| 1 July 2017 | LB | (England) | Billy Palfrey | Truro City | Released | |
| 1 July 2017 | CF | (Northern Ireland) | Louis Rooney | Linfield | Released | |
| 1 July 2017 | CF | (England) | Jordan Slew | Rochdale | Released | |
| 1 July 2017 | CM | (Republic of Ireland) | Connor Smith | Yeovil Town | Released | |
| 1 July 2017 | CF | (England) | Jimmy Spencer | Mansfield Town | Released | |
| 1 July 2017 | MF | (England) | Ben Steer | Free agent | Released | |
| 9 January 2018 | CM | (France) | Toumani Diagouraga | Fleetwood Town | Released | |
| 31 January 2018 | CB | (Czech Republic) | Jakub Sokolík | Torquay United | Released | |
| 31 January 2018 | RW | (England) | Jake Jervis | Luton Town | £125,000 | |

=== Loans in ===
| Start date | Position | Nationality | Name | From | End date | Ref. |
|---|---|---|---|---|---|---|
| 21 August 2017 | CF | (Turkey) | Nadir Çiftçi | Celtic | 9 January 2018 | |
| 20 October 2017 | GK | (England) | Remi Matthews | Norwich City | Emergency cover | |
| 28 November 2017 | GK | (England) | Will Mannion | Hull City | Emergency cover | |
| 8 December 2017 | GK | (Netherlands) | Kelle Roos | Derby County | Emergency cover | |
| 29 December 2017 | GK | (England) | Remi Matthews | Norwich City | 30 June 2018 | |
| 18 January 2018 | CB | (England) | Zak Vyner | Bristol City | 30 June 2018 | |
| 31 January 2018 | DM | (England) | Moses Makasi | West Ham | 30 June 2018 | |

=== Loans out ===
| Start date | Position | Nationality | Name | To | End date | Ref. |
|---|---|---|---|---|---|---|
| 2 September 2017 | CB | (England) | Jordan Bentley | Sutton United | 1 October 2017 | |
| 27 October 2017 | CB | (England) | Callum Rose | Dorchester Town | 30 June 2018 | |
| 4 January 2018 | CF | (England) | Alex Fletcher | Torquay United | 1 February 2018 | |
| 15 January 2018 | CF | (England) | Nathan Blissett | Macclesfield | 30 June 2018 | |
| 30 January 2018 | LW | (Scotland) | Gregg Wylde | Morecambe | 30 June 2018 | |

== Competitions ==
=== Friendlies ===
On 5 May 2017, Plymouth Argyle announced Cardiff City will visit during the pre-season schedule. A week later, it was confirmed the club will visit the Netherlands again this summer playing two friendlies whilst abroad while other friendlies were also announced in England. Two more friendlies were revealed on 25 May 2017.

| 8 July 2017 | Plymouth Parkway | 1–3 | Plymouth Argyle | Plymouth |
| 15:00 BST | Williams | Report | Carey x2' Wylde | Stadium: Bolitho Park; Attendance: 1,600; Referee: Marc Whalley |

| 8 July 2017 | Saltash United | 0–2 | Plymouth Argyle | Saltash |
| 15:00 BST | | Report | Grant; Lameiras | Stadium: Kimberley Stadium; Attendance: 1,000 (approx.); Referee: Stuart Kane |

| 11 July 2017 | Tiverton Town | 1–2 | Plymouth Argyle | Tiverton |
| 19:30 BST | Rogers 9' | Report | Sarcevic 26'; Blissett 79' | Stadium: Ladysmead; Attendance: 507; Referee: Whalley |

| 12 July 2017 | Buckland Athletic | 1–5 | Plymouth Argyle | Newton Abbot |
| 19:30 BST | Johansen 67' | Report | Blissett 14', 18'; Lameiras 65', 88'; Grant 70' | Stadium: Homers Heath; Referee: Phil Eddie |

| 15 July 2017 | Weston-super-Mare | 0–4 | Plymouth Argyle | Weston-super-Mare |
| 15:00 BST | | Report | Lameiras 8'; Jervis 17', 42'; Miller 88' | Stadium: Woodspring Stadium; Attendance: 597; Referee: Savvas Yianni |

| 18 July 2017 | Torquay United | 0–2 | Plymouth Argyle | Torquay |
| 19:45 BST | | Report | Carey 38'; Grant 89' | Stadium: Plainmoor; Attendance: 1,780 (900 away); Referee: Sarginson |

| 19 July 2017 | Devon FA XI | 0–7 | Plymouth Argyle | Newton Abbot |
| 19:30 BST | | Report | Ainsworth 11', 57'; Fletcher 16', 76'; Ryan 71', 89'; Battle 81' | Stadium: Devon FA Headquarters; Attendance: 391; Referee: Adam Bromley |

| 21 July 2017 | Plymouth Argyle | 0–1 | Cardiff City | Plymouth |
| 19:00 BST | | Report | Zohore 49' | Stadium: Home Park; Attendance: 5,021; Referee: Swabey |

| 26 July 2017 | Feyenoord | 0–0 | Plymouth Argyle | Rotterdam |
| 13:00 BST | | Report | | Stadium: Varkenoord; Attendance: Behind closed doors |

=== League One ===
==== League table ====
| Pos | Team | Pld | W | D | L | GF | GA | GD | Pts | Promotion, qualification or relegation |
|---|---|---|---|---|---|---|---|---|---|---|
| 5 | Scunthorpe United | 46 | 19 | 17 | 10 | 65 | 50 | +15 | 74 | Qualification for League One play-offs (Note: Four teams play for one spot and promotion to the EFL Championship.) |
| 6 | Charlton Athletic | 46 | 20 | 11 | 15 | 58 | 51 | +7 | 71 | Qualification for League One play-offs |
| 7 | Plymouth Argyle | 46 | 19 | 11 | 16 | 58 | 59 | −1 | 68 | |
| 8 | Portsmouth | 46 | 20 | 6 | 20 | 57 | 56 | +1 | 66 | |
| 9 | Peterborough United | 46 | 17 | 13 | 16 | 68 | 60 | +8 | 64 | |

Source: BBC Sport
Rules for classification: 1) Points; 2) Goal difference; 3) Number of goals scored

==== Result summary ====
| Overall | | | | | | | | Home | | | | | | Away | | | | | |
| Pld | W | D | L | GF | GA | GD | Pts | W | D | L | GF | GA | GD | W | D | L | GF | GA | GD |
|---|---|---|---|---|---|---|---|---|---|---|---|---|---|---|---|---|---|---|---|
| 46 | 19 | 11 | 16 | 58 | 59 | −1 | 68 | 13 | 3 | 7 | 37 | 30 | +7 | 6 | 8 | 9 | 21 | 29 | −8 |

Last updated: 6 May 2018.

==== Results by matchday ====
| Matchday | 1 | 2 | 3 | 4 | 5 | 6 | 7 | 8 | 9 | 10 | 11 | 12 | 13 | 14 | 15 | 16 | 17 | 18 | 19 | 20 | 21 | 22 | 23 | 24 | 25 | 26 | 27 | 28 | 29 | 30 | 31 | 32 | 33 | 34 | 35 | 36 | 37 | 38 | 39 | 40 | 41 | 42 | 43 | 44 | 45 | 46 |
|---|---|---|---|---|---|---|---|---|---|---|---|---|---|---|---|---|---|---|---|---|---|---|---|---|---|---|---|---|---|---|---|---|---|---|---|---|---|---|---|---|---|---|---|---|---|---|
| Ground | A | H | A | H | A | H | H | A | H | A | A | H | H | A | A | H | A | H | H | A | H | A | H | A | A | H | H | A | H | A | H | A | H | A | H | A | H | A | H | H | H | A | A | H | A | A |
| Result | L | W | D | L | L | L | L | D | L | L | L | L | D | D | W | D | W | L | W | L | W | D | W | W | D | W | W | D | L | W | W | W | W | W | W | D | W | L | W | W | D | L | D | W | L | L |
| Position | 17 | 9 | 10 | 17 | 17 | 20 | 23 | 22 | 23 | 24 | 24 | 24 | 24 | 24 | 24 | 24 | 23 | 23 | 23 | 24 | 22 | 22 | 20 | 19 | 19 | 16 | 12 | 13 | 15 | 13 | 11 | 10 | 8 | 7 | 6 | 6 | 6 | 7 | 6 | 5 | 6 | 7 | 7 | 7 | 7 | 7 |

Updated to match(es) played on 7 May 2018. Source: Statto.com
A = Away; H = Home; W = Win; D = Draw; L = Loss

==== Matches ====
| 5 August 2017 1 | Peterborough United | 2–1 | Plymouth Argyle | Peterborough |
| 15:00 BST | Sawyer 4' (o.g.); Lopes (yellow card) 29'; Morias 47'; Grant (yellow card) 66' | Report | Carey (yellow card) 27'; Fox (yellow card) 51'; Wylde 76' | Stadium: London Road Stadium; Attendance: 7,622 (1,303 away); Referee: John Busby |

| 12 August 2017 2 | Plymouth Argyle | 2–0 | Charlton Athletic | Plymouth |
| 15:00 BST | Miller (yellow card) 35'; Jervis 53', 87' | Report | | Stadium: Home Park; Attendance: 11,178 (990 away); Referee: John Brooks |

| 19 August 2017 3 | Southend United | 1–1 | Plymouth Argyle | Southend-on-Sea |
| 15:00 BST | Bradley 6' (o.g.); Timlin (yellow card) 88' | Report | Fox (yellow card) 23'; Edwards 61', (yellow card) 63' | Stadium: Roots Hall; Attendance: 7,861 (754 away); Referee: Dean Whitestone |

| 26 August 2017 4 | Plymouth Argyle | 0–4 | Scunthorpe United | Plymouth |
| 15:00 BST | Sarcevic (red card) 45+3' | Report | Madden 27', 68' (yellow card) 45+3'; Bishop (yellow card) 45+2'; Gilks (yellow card) 53'; Townsend (yellow card) 56'; Ojo (yellow card) 65'; Hopper 77'; Morris 90+4' | Stadium: Home Park; Attendance: 9,605 (281 away); Referee: Chris Sarginson |

| 2 September 2017 5 | Walsall | 2–1 | Plymouth Argyle | Bescot |
| 15:00 BST | Agyei 23'; Wilson (yellow card) 70'; Oztumer 81' | Report | Carey (yellow card) 82' (goal) 87' (pen.) | Stadium: Bescot Stadium; Attendance: 5,495 (1,525 away); Referee: Robert Jones |

| 9 September 2017 6 | Plymouth Argyle | 0–1 | Milton Keynes Dons | Plymouth |
| 15:00 BST | Carey (red card) 33'; Edwards (yellow card) 48'; Grant (yellow card) 63'; Lameiras (yellow card) 90+4' | Report | Nesbitt 8'; Williams (yellow card) 68'; Sow (yellow card) 72'; Muirhead (yellow card) 82'; Cissé (yellow card) 90' | Stadium: Home Park; Attendance: 8,566 (211 away); Referee: Charles Breakspear |

| 12 September 2017 7 | Plymouth Argyle | 1–3 | Blackpool | Blackpool |
| 19:45 BST | Bradley (yellow card) 23' (goal) 49'; Edwards (yellow card) 45+3' (yellow-red card) 65'; Miller (yellow card) 60' | Report | Daniel 2'; Ryan 70'; Delfouneso 86'; Allsop (yellow card) 89' | Stadium: Bloomfield Road; Attendance: 7,411 (115 away); Referee: Kevin Johnson |

| 16 September 2017 8 | Bury | 0–0 | Plymouth Argyle | Bury |
| 15:00 BST | Humphrey (yellow card) 23' | Report | Ness (yellow card) 89' | Stadium: Gigg Lane; Attendance: 3,642 (526 away); Referee: Anthony Backhouse |

| 23 September 2017 9 | Plymouth Argyle | 0–3 | Doncaster Rovers | Plymouth |
| 15:00 BST | Miller (yellow card) 15'; Lameiras (yellow card) 24'; Songo'o (yellow card) 40'; Bradley (red card) 80' | Report | Butler 19'; May (yellow card) 50', (goal) 73'; Marquis 59' | Stadium: Home Park; Attendance: 8,510 (341 away); Referee: Nick Kinseley |

| 26 September 2017 10 | Wigan Athletic | 1–0 | Plymouth Argyle | Wigan |
| 15:00 BST | Toney (yellow card) 77'; Powell 83' (pen) | Report | Miller (yellow card) 14'; Ness (yellow card) 27'; Sololik (yellow card) 62'; Carey (yellow card) 64' | Stadium: DW Stadium; Attendance: 7,868 (336 away); Referee: Seb Stockbridge |

| 30 September 2017 11 | Bristol Rovers | 2–1 | Plymouth Argyle | Bristol |
| 15:00 BST | Gaffney 22'; Clarke (yellow card) 40'; Bodin 62'; Harrison (yellow card) 65'; Lines (yellow card) 90+2'; Brown (yellow card) 90+4' | Report | Blissett 52'; Carey (yellow card) 57'; Miller (red card) 64'; Edwards (yellow card) 90+4' | Stadium: Memorial Stadium; Attendance: 9,879 (1,291 away); Referee: Graham Salisbury |

| 7 October 2017 12 | Plymouth Argyle | 1–2 | Fleetwood Town | Plymouth |
| 15:00 BST | Fletcher 90+5' | Report | Glendon (yellow card) 43'; Pond (yellow card) 62'; Hiwula-Mayifuila 64'; Bolger (yellow card) 72'; Dempsey (yellow card) 75'; Bell 90+3' | Stadium: Home Park; Attendance: 8,064 (139 away); Referee: Craig Hicks |

| 14 October 2017 13 | Plymouth Argyle | 1–1 | Shrewsbury Town | Plymouth |
| 15:00 BST | Carey 58' | Report | Nsiala (yellow card) 41'; Whalley 78' | Stadium: Home Park; Attendance: 8,820 (452 away); Referee: Mark Heywood |

| 17 October 2017 14 | Blackburn Rovers | 1–1 | Plymouth Argyle | Blackburn |
| 19:45 BST | Smallwood (yellow card) 13'; Dack 45+2' | Report | Carey 31' | Stadium: Ewood Park; Attendance: 10,011 (415 away); Referee: Eddie Ilderton |

| 21 October 2017 15 | AFC Wimbledon | 0–1 | Plymouth Argyle | Norbiton |
| 15:00 BST | Fuller (yellow card) 40'; Barcham (yellow card) 50' | Report | Grant 64' | Stadium: Kingsmeadow; Attendance: 4,848 (779 away); Referee: Martin Coy |

| 28 October 2017 16 | Plymouth Argyle | 1–1 | Rochdale | Plymouth |
| 15:00 BST | Grant 1' | Report | Done 33'; Williams (yellow card) 53' | Stadium: Home Park; Attendance: 8,805 (163 away); Referee: Gavin Ward |

| 11 November 2017 17 | Bradford City | 0–1 | Plymouth Argyle | Bradford |
| 15:00 GMT | | Report | Taylor-Sinclair (yellow card) 31'; Edwards (yellow card) 33'; Jervis 35' (yellow card) 39'; Sawyer (yellow card) 82' | Stadium: Valley Parade; Attendance: 20,227 (770 away); Referee: Carl Boyeson |

| 18 November 2017 18 | Plymouth Argyle | 0–4 | Oxford United | Plymouth |
| 15:00 GMT | Edwards (red card) 14'; Songo'o (yellow card) 67' | Report | Ledson 15' (pen.); Thomas 52'; Henry 68'; Obika (yellow card) 73' (goal) 77' | Stadium: Home Park; Attendance: 10,805 (837 away); Referee: Graham Horwood |

| 21 November 2017 19 | Plymouth Argyle | 2–0 | Northampton Town | Plymouth |
| 19:45 GMT | Bradley 30', 52' | Report | | Stadium: Home Park; Attendance: 7,610 (208 away); Referee: Antony Coggins |

| 25 November 2017 20 | Portsmouth | 1–0 | Plymouth Argyle | Milton |
| 15:00 GMT | Naismith 25'; Kennedy (yellow card) 90+3' | Report | Sawyer (yellow card) 32'; Diagouraga (yellow card) 90+9' | Stadium: Fratton Park; Attendance: 17,823 (1,870 away); Referee: Bobby Madley |

| 9 December 2017 21 | Plymouth Argyle | 2–1 | Gillingham | Plymouth |
| 15:00 GMT | Grant 55'; Diagouraga 90' | Report | Wagstaff (yellow card) 36'; Nugent (yellow card) 57'; Eaves 84'; Byrne (yellow card) 87' | Stadium: Home Park; Attendance: 11,115 (398 away); Referee: Darren Handley |

| 16 December 2017 22 | Rotherham United | 1–1 | Plymouth Argyle | Rotherham |
| 15:00 GMT | Towell (yellow card) 34'; Wood (yellow card) 42' (yellow-red card) 50' | Report | Carey (yellow card) 31'; Taylor 82', (yellow card) 83' | Stadium: New York Stadium; Attendance: 7,562 (456 away); Referee: Andy Haines |

| 23 December 2017 23 | Plymouth Argyle | 4–1 | Oldham Athletic | Plymouth |
| 15:00 GMT | Diagouraga 3'; Carey 6'; Edwards 59'; Jervis 72' | Report | Wilson (yellow card) 40'; Byrne (yellow card) 43'; Gerrard 56'; Hunt (yellow card) 84' | Stadium: Home Park; Attendance: 10,017 (289 away); Referee: Lee Collins |

| 26 December 2017 24 | MK Dons | 0–1 | Plymouth Argyle | Milton Keynes |
| 15:00 GMT | | Report | Sawyer 16'; Songo'o (yellow card) 47' | Stadium: Stadium MK; Attendance: 9,268 (944 away); Referee: John Busby |

| 30 December 2017 25 | Blackpool | 2–2 | Plymouth Argyle | Blackpool |
| 15:00 GMT | Tilt (yellow card) 48'; Daniel 55'; Solomon-Otabor 90+4' | Report | Lameiras 39'; Carey 45' | Stadium: Bloomfield Road; Attendance: 3,417 (546 away); Referee: John Brooks |

| 1 January 2018 26 | Plymouth Argyle | 1–0 | Walsall | Plymouth |
| 15:00 GMT | Taylor 67' | Report | Flanagan (yellow card) 40'; Bakayoko (yellow card) 73' | Stadium: Home Park; Attendance: 10,432 (275 away); Referee: Kevin Johnson |

| 6 January 2018 27 | Plymouth Argyle | 3–0 | Bury | Plymouth |
| 15:00 GMT | Diagouraga 14' (yellow card) 18'; Carey 42'; Fox (yellow card) 56'; Sarcevic 78' | Report | Lowe (red card) 60'; Danns (yellow card) 61' | Stadium: Home Park; Attendance: 9,139 (143 away); Referee: Trevor Kettle |

| 13 January 2018 28 | Doncaster Rovers | 1–1 | Plymouth Argyle | Doncaster |
| 15:00 GMT | Beestin 37'; Rowe (yellow card) 63'; May (yellow card) 74'; Baudry (yellow card) 90+1' | Report | Edwards 74' | Stadium: Keepmoat Stadium; Attendance: 7,494 (897 away); Referee: Andy Haines |

| 20 January 2018 29 | Plymouth Argyle | 1–3 | Wigan Athletic | Plymouth |
| 15:00 GMT | Carey 27' (pen) | Report | Dunkley (yellow card) 27'; Grigg 29'; Massey 45+3'; Morsy (yellow card) 45+5'; Byrne (yellow card) 47'; Vaughan (yellow card) 53'; Burn 69' | Stadium: Home Park; Attendance: 11,492 (459 away); Referee: Gavin Ward |

| 27 January 2018 30 | Oldham Athletic | 1–2 | Plymouth Argyle | Oldham |
| 15:00 GMT | Gerrard (yellow card) 50'; Songo'o 54' (o.g.); Nepomuceno (yellow card) 90' | Report | Sarcevic 17', (yellow card) 51'; Lameiras 19'; Ness (yellow card) 25'; Songo'o (yellow card) 29'; Taylor (yellow card) 52'; Matthews (yellow card) 70' | Stadium: SportsDirect.com Park; Attendance: 4,274 (688 away); Referee: Martin Coy |

| 4 February 2018 31 | Plymouth Argyle | 2–0 | Blackburn Rovers | Plymouth |
| 15:00 GMT | Lameiras 25'; Taylor 37' | Report | Samuel (yellow card) 46'; Dack (yellow card) 47'; Bennett (yellow card) 75' | Stadium: Home Park; Attendance: 11,801 (1,226 away); Referee: Charles Breakspear |

| 10 February 2018 32 | Shrewsbury Town | 1–2 | Plymouth Argyle | Shrewsbury |
| 15:00 GMT | Morris 6'; Payne (yellow card) 83' | Report | Ness 27'; Vyner 62' | Stadium: New Meadow; Attendance: 7,036 (995 away); Referee: Ben Toner |

| 13 February 2018 33 | Plymouth Argyle | 4–2 | AFC Wimbledon | Plymouth |
| 19:45 GMT | Carey 16'; Ness (yellow card) 27'; Fox 40'; Taylor 45+3'; Lameiras 67'; Sarcevic (yellow card) 71'; Makasi (yellow card) 87' | Report | Taylor 37', 59'; Charles (yellow card) 62'; Kennedy (yellow card) 74' | Stadium: Home Park; Attendance: 10,671 (246 away); Referee: Brett Huxtable |

| 17 February 2018 34 | Oxford United | 0–1 | Plymouth Argyle | Oxford |
| 15:00 GMT | Dickie (yellow card) 84' | Report | Bradley 45+3'; Taylor-Sinclair (yellow card) 86'; Taylor (yellow card) 90' | Stadium: Kassam Stadium; Attendance: 8,301 (1,802 away); Referee: Mark Heywood |

| 24 February 2018 35 | Plymouth Argyle | 1–0 | Bradford City | Plymouth |
| 15:00 GMT | Sarcevic 34' | Report | Wyke (red card) 90' | Stadium: Home Park; Attendance: 11,113 (642 away); Referee: Graham Salisbury |

| 10 March 2018 36 | Fleetwood Town | 1–1 | Plymouth Argyle | Fleetwood |
| 15:00 GMT | Coyle (yellow card) 24'; Madden 56' | Report | Makasi 16'; Fox (yellow card) 60' | Stadium: Highbury Stadium; Attendance: 3,079 (605 away); Referee: Darren Handley |

| 17 March 2018 37 | Plymouth Argyle | 3–2 | Bristol Rovers | Plymouth |
| 15:00 GMT | Carey (yellow card) 14', (goal) 85' (pen); Ness 34', 48'; Matthews (yellow card) 58' | Report | Lines 12'; Harrison 36'; Partington (yellow card) 64'; Lockyer (yellow card) 85'; Bennett (yellow card) 90+4' | Stadium: Home Park; Attendance: 13,466 (1,593 away); Referee: John Brooks |

| 24 March 2018 38 | Charlton Athletic | 2–0 | Plymouth Argyle | Charlton |
| 15:00 GMT | Page 3'; Żyro 17'; Bauer (yellow card) 27'; Reeves (yellow card) 43' | Report | Paton (yellow card) 90+3' | Stadium: The Valley; Attendance: 13,989 (3,034 away); Referee: John Busby |

| 30 March 2018 39 | Plymouth Argyle | 4–0 | Southend United | Plymouth |
| 15:00 GMT | Lameiras 3', 88'; Carey 33', 52'; Taylor (yellow card) 45+3' | Report | Wordsworth (yellow card) 42' | Stadium: Home Park; Attendance: 11,965 (445 away); Referee: Brendan Malone |

| 7 April 2018 40 | Plymouth Argyle | 2–1 | Peterborough United | Plymouth |
| 15:00 GMT | Taylor 27', (yellow card) 88'; Ness (yellow card) 33'; Carey 90+2' (pen) | Report | Marriott 9'; Taylor (yellow card) 19' (yellow-red card) 90+1'; Shephard (yellow card) 54', (red card) 75'; Cooper (yellow card) 58' | Stadium: Home Park; Attendance: 10,923 (385 away); Referee: Craig Hicks |

| 14 April 2018 41 | Plymouth Argyle | 0–0 | Portsmouth | Plymouth |
| 15:00 GMT | | Report | | Stadium: Home Park; Attendance: 14,634 (1,600 away); Referee: Dean Whitestone |

| 21 April 2018 42 | Northampton Town | 2–0 | Plymouth Argyle | Northampton |
| 15:00 GMT | Grimes (yellow card) 25'; O’Toole 42'; Bradley 61' (o.g.); Taylor (yellow card) 87' | Report | | Stadium: Sixfields Stadium; Attendance: 6,868 (1,452 away); Referee: Lee Collins |

| 24 April 2018 43 | Rochdale | 1–1 | Plymouth Argyle | Rochdale |
| 19:45 GMT | Delaney 55' | Report | Fox (yellow card) 5'; Vyner (yellow card) 17'; Grant 53'; Carey (yellow card) 64' | Stadium: Spotland; Attendance: 2,760 (539 away); Referee: Darren Drysdale |

| 28 April 2018 44 | Plymouth Argyle | 2–1 | Rotherham United | Plymouth |
| 15:00 GMT | Grant 56'; Carey 90+1' (pen) | Report | Towell 33'; Williams (yellow card) 51'; Rodák (yellow card) 90+2' | Stadium: Home Park; Attendance: 13,407 (577 away); Referee: Darren Handley |

| 1 May 2018 45 | Scunthorpe United | 2–0 | Plymouth Argyle | Scunthorpe |
| 19:45 GMT | Adelakun 32'; Holmes (yellow card) 45'; Toney 60' | Report | | Stadium: Glanford Park; Attendance: 4,712 (600~ away); Referee: Ben Toner |

| 5 May 2018 46 | Gillingham | 5–2 | Plymouth Argyle | Gillingham |
| 17:30 GMT | Parker 7'; Eaves 30', 36', 51'; Zakuani (yellow card) 45+2'; Wilkinson (yellow card) 85'; List 90+1' | Report | Grant 23'; Carey 77'; Songo'o (yellow card) 85' | Stadium: Priestfield Stadium; Attendance: 6,269 (2,461) away); Referee: Brendan Malone |

=== FA Cup ===
On 16 October 2017, Plymouth Argyle were drawn at home against Grimsby Town in the first round. A second round away trip to Bradford City was confirmed.

| 4 November 2017 First round | Plymouth Argyle | 1–0 | Grimsby Town | Plymouth |
| 15:00 GMT | Carey 9' (yellow card) 48' | Report | Davies (yellow card) 60'; Dixon (yellow card) 72' | Stadium: Home Park; Attendance: 5,137; Referee: John Busby |

| 2 December 2017 Second round | Bradford City | 3–1 | Plymouth Argyle | Bradford |
| 15:00 GMT | Vincelot 38'; Knight-Percival 50'; Wyke 64' | Report | Carey 63' | Stadium: Valley Parade; Attendance: 4,957; Referee: Tony Harrington |

=== EFL Cup ===
On 16 June 2017, Plymouth Argyle were drawn away to Bristol City in the first round.

| 8 August 2017 First round | Bristol City | 5–0 | Plymouth Argyle | Ashton Gate |
| 19:45 BST | Hegeler 2'; Baker 14'; Smith 19'; Hinds 39'; Paterson 79' | Report | | Stadium: Ashton Gate Stadium; Attendance: 9,838 (1,988 away); Referee: Oliver Langford |

=== EFL Trophy ===
On 12 July 2017, Plymouth were drawn against Chelsea U23s, Exeter City and Yeovil Town in Southern Group D.

| Pos | Lge | Team | Pld | W | PW | PL | L | GF | GA | GD | Pts | Qualification |
|---|---|---|---|---|---|---|---|---|---|---|---|---|
| 1 | L2 | Yeovil Town (Q) | 3 | 2 | 1 | 0 | 0 | 6 | 3 | +3 | 8 | Round 2 |
| 2 | ACA | Chelsea U21 (Q) | 3 | 1 | 0 | 2 | 0 | 6 | 4 | +2 | 5 | Round 2 |
| 3 | L1 | Plymouth Argyle (E) | 3 | 0 | 2 | 0 | 1 | 5 | 6 | −1 | 4 | |
| 4 | L2 | Exeter City (E) | 3 | 0 | 0 | 1 | 2 | 4 | 8 | −4 | 1 | |

Updated to match(es) played on 28 November 2017. Source: EFL.com
(E) Eliminated; (Q) Qualified to the phase indicated

| 15 August 2017 Group Game 1 | Plymouth Argyle | 2–2 (5–4 p) | Chelsea U21s | Plymouth |
| 19:00 BST | Lameiras (yellow card) 81'; Carey (yellow card) 85'; Fletcher 88', 90+1' | Report | Hudson-Odoi 62', 74'; Sterling (yellow card) 68'; Ampadu (yellow card) 90+4' | Stadium: Home Park; Attendance: 3,962 |
| | Penalties |
| | Carey (penalty scored); Fletcher (penalty scored); Ainsworth (penalty scored); Fox (penalty scored); Wylde (penalty scored) | | McCormick (penalty scored); Muheim (penalty scored); Christie-Davies (penalty scored); Maddox (penalty missed); Sterling (penalty scored) |

| 3 October 2017 Group Game 2 | Plymouth Argyle | 2–2 (5–3 p) | Exeter City | Plymouth |
| 19:45 BST | Ryan Edwards 19'; Blissett 75' | Report | McAlinden 13'; Kyle Edwards 70' | Stadium: Home Park; Attendance: 3,800 (286 away) |
| | Penalties |
| | Wylde (penalty scored); Jervis (penalty scored); Sarcevic (penalty scored); Lameiras (penalty scored); Çiftçi (penalty scored) | | (penalty missed) James; (penalty scored) Jay; (penalty scored) Sweeney; (penalty scored) Taylor |

| 28 November 2017 Group Game 3 | Yeovil Town | 2–1 | Plymouth Argyle | Yeovil |
| 19:45 GMT | James 61'; Surridge 88' | Report | Taylor 16'; Bradley (yellow card) 48'; Threlkeld (yellow card) 87' | Stadium: Huish Park; Attendance: 1,110 |
