= Robbert te Loeke =

Dutch footballer

Personal information
- Date of birth: 1 December 1988 (age 37)
- Place of birth: Arnhem, Netherlands
- Height: 1.93 m (6 ft 4 in)
- Position: Goalkeeper

Youth career
- SML
- FC Utrecht
- Vitesse
- Werder Bremen

Senior career*
| Years | Team | Apps | (Gls) |
| 2007–2008 | Werder Bremen II | 0 | (0) |
| 2008–2012 | Cambuur | 17 | (0) |
| 2012–2013 | SC Veendam | 0 | (0) |
| 2013–2016 | Dordrecht | 41 | (0) |
| 2016–2017 | Achilles '29 | 38 | (0) |
| 2017–2018 | Plymouth Argyle | 0 | (0) |
| Total | | 96 | (0) |
- * Club domestic league appearances and goals

Robbert te Loeke (born 1 December 1988) is a Dutch former professional footballer who played as a goalkeeper. In his career he played for Achilles '29, Werder Bremen II, SC Cambuur, SC Veendam, FC Dordrecht and lastly for Plymouth Argyle.

== Career ==
te Loeke started his career at SML and FC Utrecht, before a transfer to German giants SV Werder Bremen II came about. te Loeke was locked in a transfer battle which turned into a lawsuit between himself, Utrecht and Bremen, with the Dutch side wanting €350,000 as a compensation fee, and with Bremen unwilling to pay up. In the end, te Loeke found himself as back-up goalkeeper for long staying Eerste Divisie side SC Cambuur. For the 2010–11 season at Cambuur, te Loeke played against his future side Plymouth Argyle in a pre-season friendly, drawing 3–3 with the then EFL League One side.

For the 2012–13 season te Loeke left Cambuur and joined SC Veendam. Veendam went on to file for bankruptcy and in April 2013 the club folded, with their records expunged and te Loeke, after an injury hit season down to suffering from a Hernia, found himself unemployed. In the summer of 2013 he went on trial with non-contract side Team VVCS, Cypriot side Ermis Aradippou and Scottish Premiership side Ross County, but a move did not materialise and instead on 22 August 2013, te Loeke signed for FC Dordrecht as a back-up goalkeeper.

For the entirety of the 2016–17 season, te Loeke played as first choice goalkeeper for Groesbeek based side Achilles '29. Achilles were relegated with just 19 points from 38 games, and te Loeke left the club.

On 27 June 2017 te Loeke signed for EFL League One club Plymouth Argyle. He played in just two games all season, a 5–0 English League Cup defeat to Bristol City and a 2–2 EFL Trophy draw with Chelsea. He was released by Plymouth at the end of the 2017–18 season. te Loeke later called time on his professional career, stating that injuries had made his dream move to England a horror story.

== Career statistics ==
Appearances and goals by club, season and competition
| Club | Season | League | | | National Cup | | League Cup | | Other | | Total | |
| Club | Season | Division | Apps | Goals | Apps | Goals | Apps | Goals | Apps | Goals | Apps | Goals |
|---|---|---|---|---|---|---|---|---|---|---|---|---|
| Cambuur | 2011–12 | Eerste Divisie | 17 | 0 | 1 | 0 | – | | – | | 18 | 0 |
| Veendam | 2012–13 | Eerste Divisie | 0 | 0 | 0 | 0 | – | | – | | 0 | 0 |
| Dordrecht | 2013–14 | Eerste Divisie | 4 | 0 | 0 | 0 | – | | – | | 4 | 0 |
| Dordrecht | 2014–15 | Eredivisie | 3 | 0 | 0 | 0 | – | | – | | 3 | 0 |
| Dordrecht | 2015–16 | Eerste Divisie | 34 | 0 | 0 | 0 | – | | – | | 34 | 0 |
| Dordrecht | Total | | 41 | 0 | 0 | 0 | 0 | 0 | 0 | 0 | 41 | 0 |
| Achilles '29 | 2016–17 | Eerste Divisie | 38 | 0 | 1 | 0 | – | | – | | 39 | 0 |
| Plymouth Argyle | 2017–18 | League One | 0 | 0 | 0 | 0 | 1 | 0 | 1 | 0 | 2 | 0 |
| Career total | | | 96 | 0 | 2 | 0 | 1 | 0 | 1 | 0 | 100 | 0 |
