= List of Bristol Rovers F.C. players (25–99 appearances) =

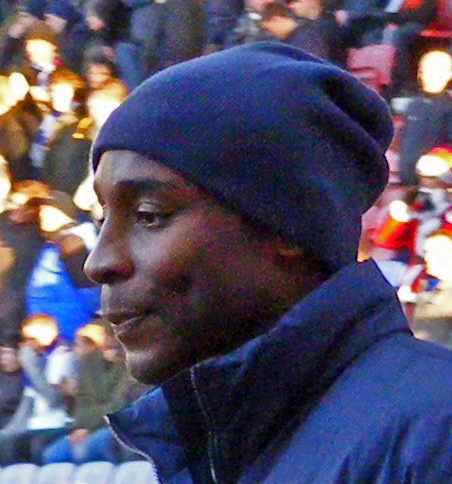
Jason Roberts was Bristol Rovers' top scorer in the 1999–2000 season with 25 goals.

Bristol Rovers Football Club is an English professional association football club based in Bristol, who play in League One, the third tier of the English football league system, as of the 2024–25 season. The club was formed in 1883 under the name Black Arabs F.C. playing their home games at Purdown in Bristol, but they used the name for only a single season, becoming Eastville Rovers and moving to a site known as Three Acres in 1884. Eastville Rovers were somewhat nomadic, moving home in 1891 to the Schoolmaster's Cricket Ground, in 1892 to Durdham Down, and in 1894 to Ridgeway, before finally settling at Eastville Stadium and changing their name to Bristol Eastville Rovers in 1897. Two years later they adopted their current name of Bristol Rovers when they became founder members of the Southern League. They remained at Eastville Stadium for 99 years, before leaving in 1986 when financial pressures meant that they could no longer afford to pay the rent, whereupon they moved to Bath City's Twerton Park, a move that saved the club £30,000 a year. After playing for ten years in Bath, the club returned to Bristol in 1997 when they agreed to share Bristol Rugby's Memorial Stadium. Since joining The Football League in 1920, when the top division of the Southern League effectively became the Football League Third Division, Rovers have spent most of their time in the second and third tiers of the English football league system; the team has never played in the top flight and spent six years, 2001 to 2007, in the fourth tier.

== Players ==
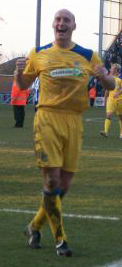
Adam Barrett played 90 league games for Rovers between 2002 and 2004.

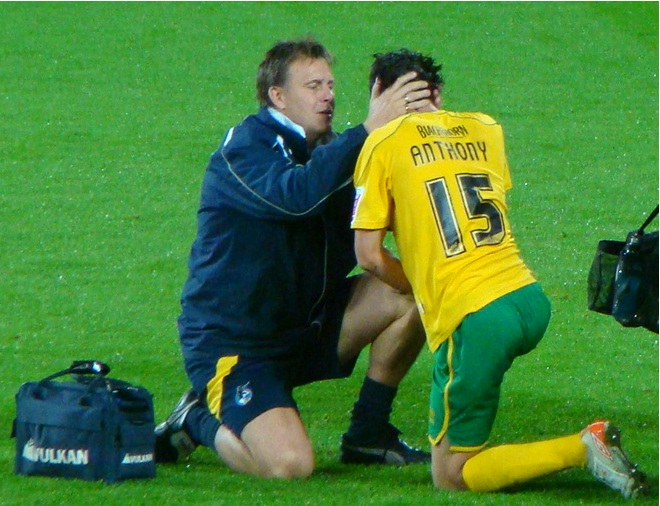
Former goalkeeper Phil Kite (left), seen here performing his duties as Rovers' physio

The list of players below includes all team members who have played between 25 and 99 professional league games for Bristol Rovers, which includes games played in the Southern League (1899–1920), Football League (1920–2014 and 2015–) and Football Conference (2014–2015), and also includes substitute appearances. Statistics are correct as of match played 21 November 2026

Position key: GK – Goalkeeper; DF – Defender; MF – Midfielder; FW – Forward

† Current Bristol Rovers player, as of 21 August 2026
‡ Capped at full international level^{[a]}

Table of players, including nationality, playing position and club statistics
Player	Nationality^{[b]}	Pos^{[c]}	Club career	Apps^{[d]}	Goals^{[e]}	Ref^{[f]}
Sandy Allan	Scotland	FW	1970–1973	58	18	
Frank Allcock	England	MF	1952–1956	59	0	
Julian Alsop	England	FW	1997–1998	33	4	
Mikkel Andersen	Denmark	GK	2009–2011 (loan)	58	0	
Harry Anderson	England	MF	2021–2023	72	6	
Ijah Anderson	England	DF	2003–2004	53	0	
John Anderson	Scotland	MF	2004–2006	54	2	
Nick Anderton	England	DF	2021–2023	35	1	
Joe Anyinsah	England	MF	2011–2013	62	8	
Arthur Attwood	England	FW	1930–1931	51	27	
Kevin Austin	Trinidad and Tobago ‡	DF	2002–2004	56	0	
Jonah Ayunga	Kenya	FW	2020–2021	30	2	
Jack Baldwin	England	DF	2020–2021	41	1	
Kofi Balmer †	Northern Ireland	DF	2026 (loan); 2026–	37	2	
Paul Bannon	Republic of Ireland	FW	1983–1986	29	8	
Victor Barney	England	MF	1965–1970	31	3	
Adam Barrett	England	DF	2002–2004	90	0	
Stewart Barrowclough	England	MF	1979–1981	61	14	
Mike Barry	England	MF	1977–1979	47	3	
George Barton	Scotland	DF	1928–1932	66	5	
Philip Bates	England	FW	1980	29	4	
Billy Beats	England ‡	FW	1903–1906	94	44	
Tommy Becton	England	FW	1901–1902	25	3	
James Belshaw	England	GK	2021–2024	80	0	
Frankie Bennett	England	MF	1996–2000	44	4	
Kyle Bennett	England	MF	2018–2021	48	3	
Les Berry	England	GK	1930–1932	34	0	
John Bethune	Scotland	DF	1920–1921	30	0	
Scott Bevan	England	GK	2011–2013	37	0	
Marcus Bignot	England	DF	2000–2001	26	1	
John Black	Scotland	FW/MF	1930–1932	49	3	
Bert Blake	England	MF	1931–1935	31	2	
Nathan Blissett	England	FW	2014–2015	25	6	
Dominic Blizzard	England	MF	2009–2011	39	1	
Billy Bodin	England	MF/FW	2015–2018	95	35	
Lamare Bogarde	Netherlands	MF	2023 (loan); 2023–2024 (loan)	32	0	
Cian Bolger	Republic of Ireland	DF	2011–2012	49	2	
Jack Bonham	Republic of Ireland	GK	2018–2019 (loan)	40	0	
Thomas Boucher	England	FW	1900–1901	27	10	
Danny Boxall	Republic of Ireland	DF	2002–2004	63	0	
Harold Boxley	England	MF/FW	1920–1923	47	0	
Patrick Boyle	Scotland	DF	1907–1908	29	1	
William Brandon	England	DF	1919–1920	26	0	
Ronnie Briggs	Northern Ireland ‡	GK	1965–1968	35	0	
Cliff Britton	England ‡	MF	1926–1930	50	1	
Tom Broadbent	England	DF	2017–2019	29	0	
Fabian Broghammer	Germany	MF	2012–2014	40	3	
Bobby Brown	England	FW/MF	1967–1972	35	4	
Jevani Brown	Jamaica	MF	2023–2025	33	1	
Wayne Brown	England	MF	2010–2012	59	3	
Ryan Brunt	England	FW	2013–2014	35	5	
Simon Bryant	England	MF	1999–2004	87	2	
Harry Buckle	Ireland ‡	FW	1907–1908	33	10	
Dave Bumpstead	England	MF	1961–1963	40	0	
Albert Butterworth	England	FW	1936–1939	95	12	
Joseph Caddick	England	FW	1914–1915	27	7	
Joe Calvert	England	GK	1931–1932	42	0	
Martin Cameron	Scotland	FW	2000–2002	39	6	
Mustapha Carayol	Gambia ‡	MF	2011–2012	30	4	
Wayne Carlisle	Northern Ireland	MF	2002–2004	71	14	
Darren Carr	England	DF	1986–1988	30	0	
Lance Carr	South Africa	FW	1946–1947	42	8	
Tim Carter	England	GK	1985–1987	47	0	
Ray Cashley	England	GK	1982–1985	53	0	
Fabrizio Cavegn †	Switzerland	FW	2025–	57	14	
Jonson Clarke-Harris	England	FW	2019–2020	42	24	
David Clarkson	Scotland ‡	FW	2012–2014	60	12	
Seanan Clucas	Northern Ireland	MF	2012–2014	36	0	
George Chance	England	FW	1920–1924	80	11	
Josh Coburn	England	FW	2022–2023 (loan)	35	10	
James Connolly	Wales	DF	2022 (loan); 2022–2024	66	2	
Kamil Conteh	Sierra Leone ‡	MF	2024–2026	62	1	
Tommy Cook	England ‡	FW	1931–1933	42	20	
Terry Cooper	England ‡	DF/MF	1979–1981	59	0	
Mick Cosgrove	Scotland	MF	1928–1930	58	6	
Paul Coutts	Scotland	MF	2021–2023	62	0	
Matthew Cox	England	GK	2023–2024 (loan)	28	0	
Tony Craig	England	DF	2018–2020	97	5	
Tristan Crama	France	DF	2023–2024 (loan)	27	0	
Steve Cross	England	MF	1991–1996	43	2	
Nick Culkin	England	GK	2000–2001	45	0	
Bill Culley	Scotland	FW	1926–1928	57	45	
Keith Curle	England ‡	DF	1981–1983	32	4	
Frank Curran	England	FW	1938–1947	37	24	
Walter Currie	Scotland	MF	1922–1923	42	0	
James Daly	England	FW	2020–2021	31	3	
J. Dargue	Scotland	FW	1908–1909	36	3	
William Davies	England	MF	1900–1903	49	0	
George Davison	England	FW	1914–1920	57	20	
Jimmy Daws	England	MF	1924–1925	29	0	
Miah Dennehy	Republic of Ireland ‡	MF	1978–1980	52	6	
George Dennis	England	DF	1930–1932	26	4	
Norman Dinsdale	England	MF	1930–1932	31	3	
Colin Dobson	England	FW	1972–1976	63	4	
Bill Dodgin	England	MF	1936–1937	30	1	
George Douglas	England	FW	1926–1928	45	5	
Brian Doyle	England	DF	1957–1960	43	1	
Darryl Duffy	Scotland	FW	2008–2011	76	16	
Albert Dunkley	England	FW	1904–1906	54	9	
Jermaine Easter	Wales‡	FW	2015–2017	68	12	
Christian Edwards	Wales ‡	DF	2003–2006	99	3	
Les Edwards	England	DF	1948–1958	47	0	
Sam Edwards	England	FW	1924–1925	33	5	
Max Ehmer	Germany	DF	2020–2021	28	1	
Jack Ellis	England	GK	1934–1938	86	0	
Gary Emmanuel	Wales	MF	1979–1981	65	2	
Andrew Evans	Wales	MF	1975–1977	42	2	
Jack Evans	Wales ‡	FW	1926–1928	63	7	
John Eyres	England	FW	1932–1934	63	12	
Alex Findlay	England	MF	1930–1932	37	9	
William Floyd	England	DF	1908–1909	34	0	
Mark Foran	England	DF	2000–2002	43	2	
Fred Forbes	Scotland	FW	1929–1931	63	10	
Jim Forbes	England	MF	1926–1928	59	5	
Tony Ford	England	DF	1969–1971	28	1	
Shaq Forde †	England	FW	2024–	71	7	
Jamie Forrester	England	FW	2004–2006	52	9	
Gerry Francis	England ‡	MF	1985–1986; 1988	34	0	
John Frowen	Wales	DF	1958–1963	84	0	
Roger Frude	England	FW/MF	1963–1967	41	8	
Samuel Furniss	England	MF	1921–1924	90	2	
Kevin Gall	Wales	MF/FW	2001–2003	50	5	
Bobby Gardiner	Scotland	FW	1937–1939	66	10	
Jimmy Gardner	England	FW	1925–1926	32	4	
William Gerrish	England	FW	1904–1909	49	11	
Ali Gibb	England	DF/MF	2004–2006	64	2	
Viv Gibbins	England ‡	FW	1932–1933	37	15	
James Gibbons	England	DF	2022–2024	37	0	
Lewis Gibson	England	DF	2022–2023 (loan)	31	1	
Carl Gilbert	England	FW	1969–1971	45	15	
Matthew Gill	England	MF	2011–2013	45	0	
Donnie Gillies	Scotland	DF	1980–1983	59	0	
Brian Godfrey	Wales ‡	MF	1971–1973	81	16	
Lewis Gordon	Scotland	DF	2022–2024	61	0	
Jake Gosling	Gibraltar‡	MF	2014–2017	41	3	
Bill Gould	England	FW	1906–1907	38	1	
Bobby Gould	England	FW	1977–1978	36	12	
Josh Grant	England	MF	2020–2024	84	5	
Josiah Gray	England	MF	1903–1904	32	3	
Richard Gray	England	GK	1899–1902	53	0	
Giuliano Grazioli	England	FW	2002–2003	34	11	
Mike Green	England	DF	1971–1974	77	2	
Ron Green	England	GK	1985–1986	56	0	
Ryan Green	Wales ‡	DF	2006–2009	71	0	
Hillary Griffiths	England	FW	1900–1901; 1904–1905	47	14	
Joe Griffiths	England	FW	1912–1920	44	1	
Josh Griffiths	England	GK	2024–2025 (loan)	28	0	
Walter Hales	England	DF	1904–1908	77	2	
Jack Hall	England	DF	1920–1922	28	0	
Jock Hamilton	Scotland	MF	1929–1931	63	2	
Frank Handley	England	MF	1907–1910	93	0	
Brandon Hanlan	England	FW	2020–2021	45	7	
Steve Harding	England	DF	1977–1981	38	1	
Paul Hardyman	England	DF	1992–1995	67	5	
Josh Hare	England	DF	2019–2021	29	0	
Cian Harries	Wales	DF	2020–2022	47	1	
Tom Harris	England	FW	1935–1937	28	16	
Matt Harrold	England	FW	2011–2014	76	24	
Billy Hartill	England	FW	1936–1938	36	19	
Irvine Harwood	England	FW	1934–1936	51	14	
Matt Hayfield	England	DF	1994–1998	41	0	
Barry Hayles	Jamaica ‡	FW	1997–1998	62	32	
Paul Hendrie	Scotland	MF	1977–1979	31	1	
Kenny Hibbitt	England	MF	1986–1990	53	5	
Martin Higgins	England	MF	1908–1909	27	2	
Peter Higgins	Wales	MF	1969–1973	37	5	
David Hillier	England	MF	1999–2002	83	1	
Lewis Hogg	England	MF	1999–2003	57	3	
Syd Holcroft	England	FW	1924–1927	33	9	
Syd Homer	England	FW	1927–1929	38	4	
Luca Hoole	Wales	DF	2019–2024	89	3	
Will Hoskins	England	FW	2010–2011	43	17	
Harold Houghton	England	FW	1935–1937	63	23	
James Howie	Scotland ‡	FW	1902–1903	26	10	
Scott Howie	Scotland	GK	2001–2003	90	0	
Archie Hughes	Scotland	MF/FW	1911–1912	34	5	
Mark Hughes	Wales	DF	1980–1984	74	3	
Jack Hunt	England	DF	2023–2025	45	3	
James Hunt	England	MF	2004–2007	95	6	
Harold Hutchinson	Scotland	MF	1906–1908	30	1	
Isaac Hutchinson	England	MF	2024–2026	45	5	
Graham Hyde	England	MF	2002–2004	58	3	
Sammy Igoe	England	MF	2006–2008	72	2	
Albert Iles	England	FW	1937–1939	46	19	
Anssi Jaakkola	Finland ‡	GK	2019–2023	46	0	
Billy Jackson	England	FW	1932–1934	37	14	
Trevor Jacobs	England	DF	1973–1976	82	3	
Joe Jacobson	Wales	DF	2007–2009	73	1	
Alex Jakubiak	Scotland	FW	2018–2019 (loan)	38	2	
Gavin Jarvie	Scotland	DF	1904–1907	89	1	
Bryn Jones	Wales	MF	1969–1975	90	6	
Jack Jones	England	FW	1897–1902	76	36	
James Jones	England	FW	1911–1915	39	12	
Lee Jones	Wales	GK	1998–2000	76	0	
Scott Jones	England	DF	2000–2002	58	3	
Gavin Kelly	England	GK	1990–1994	30	0	
Michael Kelly	Scotland	DF	2017–2021	27	0	
Jack Kifford	Scotland	DF	1900–1901	28	0	
Alf King	Scotland	FW	1928–1930	45	10	
Phil Kite	England	GK	1980–1984	96	0	
James Lamont	Scotland	MF	1899–1900	27	2	
John Laurie	Scotland	FW	1909–1910	42	3	
Thomas Lea	England	FW	1922–1924	49	1	
Luke Leahy	England	DF	2019–2021	70	8	
Fred Leamon	Jersey	FW	1946–1949	43	21	
Syd Leigh	England	FW	1920–1922	68	36	
Stéphane Léoni	France	DF	1998–2000	38	0	
Doug Lewis	England	MF/FW	1932–1934	27	4	
Jack Lewis	Wales ‡	FW	1899–1900; 1904–1906	81	30	
James Liddell	Scotland	FW	1921–1924	31	5	
Henry Liley	England	GK	1946–1951	27	0	
Jamie Lindsay	Scotland	MF	2024–2025	28	2	
Larry Lloyd	England ‡	DF	1967–1969	43	1	
Matt Lockwood	England	DF	1996–1998	63	1	
Ryan Loft	England	FW	2022–2023	50	5	
Fred Lunn	England	FW	1922–1923	31	10	
Billy Lyon	Scotland	MF	1901–1903	49	2	
Jimmy McCambridge	Ireland ‡	FW	1933–1935	58	23	
Christian McClean	England	FW	1988–1991	51	6	
Adam McColl	Scotland	FW	1909–1911	32	1	
Luke McCormick	England	MF	2020–2021 (loan); 2022–	96	10	
Frank McCourt	Northern Ireland ‡	MF	1945–1950	32	1	
Scott McGleish	England	FW	2011–2012	27	7	
John McIlvenny	England	FW	1952–1959	79	11	
Bobby McKay	Scotland ‡	FW	1932–1935	91	17	
Mark McKeever	Republic of Ireland	MF	1998–1999 (loan); 2001–2003	42	0	
Ian McLean	Canada ‡	DF	1993–1994	35	2	
Jack McLean	Scotland	MF	1902–1903	29	1	
Lee Maddison	England	DF	1991–1995	73	0	
Lee Mansell	England	MF	2014–2017	81	7	
John Marquis	England	FW	2022–2024	71	13	
Walter Marriott	England	FW	1902–1904	56	6	
Chris Martin	Scotland ‡	FW	2023–2025	56	21	
Lee Martin	England	DF	1996–1998	25	0	
Ronnie Mauge	Trinidad and Tobago ‡	MF	1999–2002	53	0	
Jeff Meacham	England	FW	1987–1988	26	9	
Michael Meaker	Wales	MF	1998–2001	27	2	
Don Megson	England	DF	1970–1971	31	1	
Alec Millar	Scotland	DF	1937–1939	52	0	
Kevin Miller	England	GK	2003–2005	72	0	
Esmond Million	England	GK	1962–1963	38	0	
Tommy Mills	Wales ‡	FW	1936–1939	99	17	
Clinton Mola †	England	DF	2024–	82	2	
Andy Monkhouse	England	MF	2014–2015	39	8	
Cristian Montano	Colombia	MF	2015–2017	53	3	
Byron Moore	England	MF	2016–2018	47	2	
Taylor Moore	England	DF	2024–2026	51	1	
Trevor Morgan	England	FW	1985–1987	55	24	
Sam Morris	England	MF	1911–1915	89	0	
Ian Muir	Scotland	MF	1953–1957	26	0	
Bobby Muir	Scotland	FW	1901–1903	46	6	
Bill Murray	Scotland	MF	1933–1935	40	0	
David Murray	South Africa ‡	MF/FW	1928–1930	39	12	
John Neilson	Scotland	MF	1900–1902	49	6	
Ron Nicholls	England	GK	1954–1958	71	0	
Tom Nichols	England	FW	2017–2020	94	4	
Sam Nicholson	Scotland	MF	2020–2022	64	11	
Paul Nixon	New Zealand ‡	FW	1989–1991	44	6	
Oliver Norburn	England	MF	2011–2014	56	3	
Malcolm Norman	Wales	GK	1958–1962	69	0	
Joe Norton	England	FW	1920–1922	36	2	
Mark O'Connor	England	MF	1984–1986	80	10	
Gatlin O'Donkor	England	FW	2024–2025 (loan)	28	4	
John-Joe O'Toole	Republic of Ireland	MF	2013–2014	59	16	
Eric Oakton	England	FW	1931–1932	40	9	
Abu Ogogo	England	MF	2019–2021	46	3	
Promise Omochere †	Republic of Ireland	FW	2024–	37	6	
Arthur Ormston	England	FW	1927–1928	27	15	
Gilbert Ovens	England	DF	1904–1910	66	0	
Bill Panes	England	DF	1916–1924	91	0	
John Parker	England	FW	1922–1924	27	6	
Sonny Parker	England	DF	2002–2005	30	1	
Joe Partington	England	DF	2017–2019	53	3	
Jim Paterson	Scotland	DF	2012–2013	43	1	
John Paterson	Scotland	FW	1928–1932	46	5	
John Paul	Scotland	FW	1899–1901	51	13	
Charles Payne	England	FW	1914–1915	31	3	
Shaun Penny	England	FW	1979–1982	60	13	
Ivor Perry	Wales	MF	1927–1929	35	1	
Jason Perry	Wales ‡	DF	1997–1998	25	0	
Robbie Pethick	England	DF	1999–2001	63	2	
John Petts	England	MF	1965–1970	92	3	
Harry Phillips	England	MF	1910–1913	63	2	
Jack Phillips	Wales	FW	1928–1930	65	37	
Wilkie Phillips	England	FW	1923–1925	90	35	
David Pipe	Wales ‡	MF	2007–2010	86	3	
Dick Plumb	England	FW	1965–1968	39	8	
Dwayne Plummer	England^{[g]}	FW	2000–2002	35	1	
Wayne Powell	Wales	FW	1972–1978	32	10	
Graeme Power	England	DF	1996–1998	26	0	
Jack Preece	England	DF	1935–1938	79	0	
Charlie Preedy	England	GK	1933–1934	39	0	
Stanley Prout	England	FW	1934–1936	39	5	
Rob Quinn	Republic of Ireland	MF	2002–2004	79	3	
Tom Ramasut	Wales	MF	1996–1998	42	6	
J. Rankin	Scotland	FW	1910–1912	47	6	
George Reay	England	FW	1928–1930	67	9	
Charlie Reece	England	MF	2007–2011	30	0	
Carl Regan	England	DF	2009–2011	56	0	
Gavin Reilly	Scotland	FW	2018–2020	34	4	
George Richards	England	FW	1911–1913	28	10	
Graham Ricketts	England	MF	1954–1961	32	0	
Sean Rigg	England	MF/FW	2006–2010	57	2	
Harry Roberts	England	DF	1937–1939	77	1	
Jason Roberts	Grenada ‡	FW	1998–2000	78	38	
John Roberts	England	FW	1907–1910	82	28	
William Robertson	Wales	MF	1899–1903	65	3	
A. Rodgers	Unknown	FW	1909–1911	28	0	
Alex Rodman	England	MF	2018–2023	76	8	
Harold Roe	England	FW	1912–1920	62	12	
Ken Ronaldson	Scotland	MF/FW	1965–1969	76	15	
Albert Rotherham	England	DF/MF	1925–1929	46	0	
Bill Routledge	England	FW	1931–1934	64	5	
Joe Rowley	England	MF	1926–1928	61	2	
John Rudge	England	FW	1972–1975	70	17	
George Russell	England	DF	1931–1932	55	1	
Jock Rutherford	England	MF	1922–1923	29	1	
Robbie Ryan	Republic of Ireland	DF	2004–2007	65	0	
Andy Sandell	England	MF	2006–2007	36	3	
Harvey Saunders	England	FW	2021–2023	33	2	
Arthur Savage	England	FW	1906–1909	40	3	
Dave Savage	Republic of Ireland ‡	MF	2003–2005	65	3	
Gary Sawyer	England	DF	2010–2012	61	0	
John Scales	England	DF	1985–1987	72	2	
Robert Scorer	England	MF	1923–1925	37	0	
Tony Sealy	England	FW	1989–1991	37	7	
Joel Senior	England	DF	2024–2026	50	0	
Scott Shearer	Scotland	GK	2005–2007	47	0	
James Shervey	Unknown	FW	1909–1914	50	16	
Michael Slocombe	England	MF	1956–1963	32	0	
Sam Slocombe	England	GK	2017–2018	25	0	
Richard Smallwood †	England	MF	2026 (loan); 2026–	28	0	
Adam Smith	England	GK	2017–2019	28	0	
Andrew Smith	Scotland	FW	1903–1906	70	35	
Jimmy Smith	Scotland	FW	1933–1935	26	13	
John Smith	England	FW	1907–1908	31	10	
Len Smith	England	MF	1926–1929	45	1	
Mark Smith	England	MF	1998–2002	33	0	
Sidney Smith	England	MF	1923–1925	39	0	
Wilf Smith	England	DF	1975–1976	54	2	
Wilf Smith	England	DF/MF	1937–1946	26	0	
Ruel Sotiriou	Cyprus	FW	2024–2026	51	6	
Lino Sousa	England	DF	2024–2025 (loan)	25	0	
Jack Sparkes †	England	DF	2025–	50	3	
Arthur Squires	England	FW	1913–1915	57	8	
Craig Stanley	England	MF	2011–2012	34	1	
Harry Stansfield	England	GK	1912–1921	60	0	
David Steele	Scotland ‡	MF	1919–1922	67	2	
Byron Stevenson	Wales ‡	MF	1985–1986	31	3	
Bill Stoddart	England	MF	1931–1933	40	0	
Thomas Strang	Unknown	MF	1907–1909	59	1	
Kevin Street	England	MF	2002–2003	33	2	
Robin Stubbs	England	FW	1969–1972	93	32	
Les Sullivan	England	FW	1936–1938	40	10	
Ben Swallow	Wales	MF	2009–2011	40	0	
Ryan Sweeney	Republic of Ireland	DF	2017 (loan); 2017–2018 (loan)	39	3	
Paul Tait	England	FW	2002–2004	74	19	
Tommy Tait	Scotland ‡	DF	1903–1906	96	1	
Albert Taylor	England	FW	1933–1936	53	17	
David Taylor	England	DF	1914–1915	26	0	
Gareth Taylor	Wales ‡	DF/FW	1991–1995	47	16	
John Taylor	England	FW	1992–1994	95	44	
Larry Taylor	England	GK	1965–1970	90	0	
Lee Thorpe	England	FW	2004–2005	35	4	
Danny Tolland	Ireland	FW	1937–1939	34	3	
Frank Townrow	England	MF/FW	1931–1933	50	6	
Robert Trees	England	MF	1998–2001	46	1	
Paul Trollope	Wales ‡	MF	2004–2006	30	2	
Mike Trought	England	DF	1999–2002	33	0	
Robbie Turner	England	FW	1987	26	2	
Samuel Turner	England	FW	1907–1908	30	9	
George Tweed	England	DF	1936–1937	25	0	
Ed Upson	England	MF	2018–2021	94	4	
Harvey Vale	Republic of Ireland ‡	MF	2023–2024 (loan)	39	2	
Gary Waddock	Republic of Ireland ‡	MF	1992–1994	71	1	
Davie Walker	England	FW	1905–1907; 1911–1912	78	28	
Sid Wallington	England	MF	1933–1937	94	1	
Mark Walters	England ‡	MF	1999–2002	82	13	
James Walton	England	MF/FW	1923–1924	40	1	
Grant Ward	England	MF	2023–2025	75	3	
Jed Ward	England	GK	2021–2026	38	0	
Zain Westbrooke	England	MF	2020–2023	46	2	
John Westwood	England	DF	1909–1915	98	0	
Glenn Whelan	Republic of Ireland ‡	MF	2021–2023	42	0	
Tom White	England	DF	1994–2000	54	1	
Wilfred Whitfield	England	MF	1938–1947	26	1	
Percival Whitton	England	MF	1918–1920	29	1	
Freddie Wilcox	England	FW	1901–1903	48	18	
Jonah Wilcox	England	FW	1925–1926	32	18	
Andy Williams	England	MF/FW	2007–2010	88	8	
Bobby Williams	England	FW	1967–1969	29	5	
George Williams	England	DF	2021	26	0	
Johnny Williams	England	MF	1966–1969	69	10	
Keith Williams	England	FW	1962–1963	49	18	
Ryan Williams	England	MF	2003–2006	43	4	
Tom Williams	England	MF/FW	1926–1928	75	27	
Che Wilson	England	DF	2000–2002	75	0	
D. Wilson	Unknown	FW	1903–1905	35	12	
James Wilson	Wales ‡	DF	2023–2025	72	2	
Danny Woodards	England	DF	2011–2014	70	4	
Billy Woodhall	England	FW	1923–1925	38	13	
Jack Woodman	England	FW	1935–1937	39	21	
Ken Wookey	Wales	FW	1946–1948	54	9	
Frank Wragge	England	DF/MF	1923–1926	62	1	
Ian Wright	England	DF	1993–1996	54	1	
Bert Young	England	FW	1930–1932	75	11	
Brad Young †	England	GK	2025–	40	0	
Jack Young	Scotland	FW	1906–1907	33	14	
Lee Zabek	England	DF	1997–2000	29	1	
Chris Zebroski	England	FW	2011–2012	39	3	

== Footnotes ==
- ^{a} Unless otherwise stated, all international caps are taken from Byrne & Jay (2003).
- ^{b} A player's nationality is defined as the country they have represented at the international level if they have done so; otherwise it is their country of birth.
- ^{c} Playing positions are taken from Byrne & Jay (2003) unless otherwise stated.
- ^{d} Number of league appearances for Bristol Rovers
- ^{e} Number of league goals scored for Bristol Rovers
- ^{f} Unless otherwise stated, player statistics are taken from Byrne & Jay (2003).
- ^{g} Dwayne Plummer played one unofficial game for the Cayman Islands national team in 2000, before being declared ineligible to represent them. He is English-born.

== See also ==
- List of Bristol Rovers F.C. players
- Category:Bristol Rovers F.C. players
- Bristol Rovers F.C.#Current squad

== Bibliography ==
- Byrne, Stephen; Jay, Mike (2003). Bristol Rovers Football Club: The Definitive History 1883–2003. Stroud: Tempus Publishing. ISBN 978-0-7524-2717-1.
- Rollin, Glenda; Rollin, Jack, eds. (2007). Sky Sports Football Yearbook 2007–2008. London: Headline Publishing Group. ISBN 978-0-7553-1664-9.
- Rollin, Glenda; Rollin, Jack, eds. (2009). Sky Sports Football Yearbook 2009–2010. London: Headline Publishing Group. ISBN 978-0-7553-1948-0.
