= Jack Preece =

Jack Preece is the name of:

- Jack Preece (footballer)
- Jack Preece (rugby union)
