= Cyril Bridge =

English footballer

Personal information
- Date of birth: 28 August 1909
- Place of birth: Bristol, England
- Date of death: 27 January 1988 (aged 78)
- Place of death: Bristol, England
- Height: 5 ft 10 in (1.78 m)
- Position: Left back

Senior career*
Years	Team	Apps	(Gls)
19??–1932	St Philips Marsh Adult School		
1932–1939	Bristol City	155	(0)
- * Club domestic league appearances and goals

Cyril Bridge (28 August 1909 – 27 January 1988) was an English footballer who played as a left back. He made over 150 Football League appearances in the years before the Second World War.

== Career ==
Bridge played locally for St Philips Marsh Adult School in the Bristol & District League. Joe Bradshaw signed Bridge in August 1930 for Bristol City. After retirement Bridge remained local until his death in 1988 when his ashes were scattered on the pitch at Ashton Gate.
