= Carl Gilbert =

Carl Gilbert may refer to:

- Carl Gilbert (footballer) (born 1948), former English footballer
- Carl A. Gilbert (1892–1972), American football coach
- Carl J. Gilbert (1906–1983), American lobbyist and trade representative
