= Michael Slocombe =

English footballer (1941–2022)

Personal information
- Date of birth: 3 May 1941
- Place of birth: Bristol, England
- Date of death: 30 August 2022 (aged 81)
- Position: Midfielder

Youth career
- ?–1956: Dings United
- 1956–1961: Bristol Rovers

Senior career*
Years	Team	Apps	(Gls)
1961–1963	Bristol Rovers	32	(0)
1963–1967	Welton Rovers		
1967–1969	Bath City		
1969–1971	Welton Rovers		
1971–?	St Philips Marsh Adult School		
?–1979	Doug Hillard Sport		
1979–1984	Venture United		
1984–1990	Hungerford Ferrets		

Managerial career
- 1990–????: St Philips Marsh Adult School
- * Club domestic league appearances and goals

Michael Slocombe (3 May 1941 – 30 August 2022) was an English professional footballer who played as a midfielder in the English Football League for Bristol Rovers.

== Career ==
Slocombe signed his first professional contract with The Pirates in the summer of 1961 and made 32 appearances in two seasons with the club.

== Later life and death ==
Following a leg break, Slocombe retired from football in 1990. He went on to work as a window cleaner as well as spending 25 years as a relief school caretaker for Bristol City Council. Slocombe died on 30 August 2022.
