= 1950–51 FA Cup qualifying rounds =

Tournament details
- Country: England; Wales

The FA Cup 1950–51 is the 70th season of the world's oldest football knockout competition; The Football Association Challenge Cup, or FA Cup for short. The large number of clubs entering the tournament from lower down the English football league system meant that the competition started with a number of preliminary and qualifying rounds. The 25 victorious teams from the fourth round qualifying progressed to the first round proper.

== Extra preliminary round ==
=== Ties ===
Tie	Home team	Score	Away team
1	Alnwick Town	4–0	Newbiggin Colliery Welfare
2	Amersham Town	0–13	Wycombe Wanderers
3	Ashby Institute	8–1	Armthorpe Welfare
4	Barton Town	5–3	Upton Colliery
5	Basford United	1–5	Langold W M C
6	Basingstoke Town	1–2	Alton Town
7	Beccles	4–2	Diss Town
8	Bedford Avenue	6–1	Bedford St Cuthberts
9	Bedford Queens Works	6–5	Lynton Works
10	Betteshanger Colliery Welfare	1–0	Folkestone
11	Biggleswade & District	6–0	Dunstable Town
12	Bishop's Stortford	2–1	Leyton
13	Boldon Colliery Welfare	3–1	Morpeth Town
14	Brandon Colliery Welfare	0–1	Ushaw Moor
15	Brigg Town	3–1	Lysaghts Sports
16	Buckingham Town	1–5	Yiewsley
17	Burscough	3–1	St Helens Town
18	Chertsey Town	1–3	Wimbledon
19	Chesham United	4–2	Witney Town
20	Cheshunt	4–2	Hoddesdon Town
21	Chippenham United	6–0	Coleford Athletic
22	Cockfield	0–3	Shildon
23	Cromptons Recreation	3–0	U G B St Helens
24	Crossens	0–12	Skelmersdale United
25	Dorchester Town	6–3	Portland United
26	Eastern Coachworks	8–2	Fakenham Town
27	Ellesmere Port Town w/o-scr Wallasey Transport		
28	Enfield	5–0	Pinner
29	Evenwood Town	5–2	Langley Park Colliery Welfare
30	Ferryhill Athletic	2–2	Crook Town
31	Finchley	5–0	Stevenage Town
32	Flint Town United	4–2	Liverpool Police
33	Frome Town	0–5	Bath City
34	Hallam	2–4	Worksop Town
35	Haverhill Rovers	2–2	Bungay Town
36	Headington United	6–0	Kidlington
37	Heanor Athletic	3–1	Bourne Town
38	Hemel Hempstead	1–1	Banbury Spencer
39	Holbeach United	2–0	Bentinck Colliery Welfare
40	Ilfracombe Town	8–2	Ilminster Town
41	Leavesden	8–1	Morris Motors
42	Letchworth Town	3–2	Arlesey Town
43	Longfleet St Mary's	1–1	Hamworthy
44	Lynemouth Welfare	2–9	West Stanley
45	Margate	1–2	Ashford
46	Marlow	2–4	Aylesbury United
47	Marston Shelton Rovers	3–0	Bedford Corinthians
48	Meltham	2–3	Marsden
49	Metropolitan Police	2–1	Surbiton Town
50	Moor Green	2–2	Lye Town
51	N A C Athletic	1–5	Huntley & Palmers
52	Newburn	3–1	Wardley Welfare
53	Newport I O W	4–0	Totton
54	Newquay	7–0	Weston Super Mare St Johns
55	Odd Down	0–6	Corsham Town
56	Osberton Radiator	1–2	Pressed Steel
57	Ossett Town	5–2	Brunswick Institute
58	Oswestry Town	2–1	Hednesford Town
59	Parliament Street Methodists	3–4	Linby Colliery
60	Peasedown Miners Welfare	0–3	Chippenham Town
61	Plymouth United	0–4	Green Waves
62	Polytechnic	2–6	Hertford Town
63	Purton	5–3	Pewsey Vale
64	Radstock Town	2–3	Westbury United
65	Ransome & Marles	6–0	Mablethorpe
66	Redhill	2–2	Vickers Armstrong
67	Retford Town	2–0	Boots Athletic
68	Rufford Colliery	7–3	Neville's Athletic
69	Ryde Sports	2–1	Andover
70	Seaham Colliery Welfare	1–2	Eppleton Colliery Welfare
71	Shaftesbury	2–1	Bournemouth Gasworks Athletic
72	Shankhouse	2–6	Cramlington Welfare
73	Shefford Town	3–3	Huntingdon United
74	Shepton Mallet Town	1–5	Devizes Town
75	Sheringham	3–1	Felixstowe United
76	Sherwood Colliery	0–8	Ilkeston Town
77	Skegness Town	3–10	Boston United
78	Slough Centre	2–2	Abingdon Town
79	South Hetton Colliery Welfare	2–1	Stanley United
80	South Shields Ex Schoolboys	1–1	Annfield Plain
81	Spennymoor United	1–2	Blackhall Colliery Welfare
82	St Blazey	3–3	Exmouth Town
83	St Ives Town	2–1	Kempston Rovers
84	Stamford	1–1	Raleigh Athletic
85	Sudbury Town	4–0	Churchman Sports
86	Sutton Town	0–1	Shirebrook
87	Sutton Town (Birmingham)	0–3	Stourbridge
88	Sutton United	3–1	Banstead Athletic
89	Swindon British Railways	4–1	Melksham
90	Taunton	4–2	Wadebridge Town
91	Teversal & Silverhill Colliery Welfare	2–2	Long Eaton Town
92	Thorne Colliery	2–2	Pilkington Recreation
93	Thornycroft Athletic	5–5	Pirelli General Cables
94	Truro City	4–3	Callington
95	Tufnell Park Edmonton	6–3	Harrow Town
96	Vauxhall Motors	5–0	Stewartby Works
97	Ware	4–0	Wood Green Town
98	Warminster Town	6–2	Timsbury Athletic
99	Welton Rovers	5–4	Swindon Victoria
100	West Auckland Town	2–1	Chilton Athletic
101	Whitstable	1–0	Chatham Town
102	Windsor & Eton	1–1	Maidenhead United
103	Wingate Welfare	4–2	Murton Colliery Welfare
104	Woking	2–2	Carshalton Athletic
105	Wolverton Town & B R	3–2	Eynesbury Rovers
106	Wootton Bassett Town	2–1	Spencer Moulton
107	Wootton Blue Cross	2–0	Waterlows
108	Wymondham Town	1–5	City Of Norwich School O B U
109	Yorkshire Amateur	4–1	Harrogate Town

=== Replays ===
Tie	Home team	Score	Away team
30	Crook Town	4–4	Ferryhill Athletic
35	Bungay Town	2–1	Haverhill Rovers
38	Banbury Spencer	5–1	Hemel Hempstead
43	Hamworthy	1–0	Longfleet St Mary's
50	Lye Town	3–1	Moor Green
66	Vickers Armstrong	4–2	Redhill
73	Huntingdon United	5–4	Shefford Town
78	Abingdon Town	4–3	Slough Centre
80	Annfield Plain	3–1	South Shields Ex Schoolboys
82	Exmouth Town	1–4	St Blazey
84	Raleigh Athletic	5–2	Stamford
91	Long Eaton Town	3–2	Teversal & Silverhill Colliery Welfare
92	Pilkington Recreation	3–5	Thorne Colliery
93	Pirelli General Cables	3–2	Thornycroft Athletic
102	Maidenhead United	2–1	Windsor & Eton
104	Carshalton Athletic	7–4	Woking

=== 2nd replay ===
Tie	Home team	Score	Away team
30	Ferryhill Athletic	0–4	Crook Town

== Preliminary round ==
=== Ties ===
Tie	Home team	Score	Away team
1	Alnwick Town	10–2	Newburn
2	Amble	1–1	Hexham Hearts
3	Arundel	1–0	Bognor Regis Town
4	Ashby Institute	2–1	Thorne Colliery
5	Ashington	3–1	Annfield Plain
6	Aylesbury United	2–2	Uxbridge
7	Aylesford Paper Mills	0–3	Tonbridge
8	Baldock Town	1–3	Huntingdon United
9	Barnet	2–3	Hendon
10	Barry Town	4–0	Soundwell
11	Barton Town	1–3	Frickley Colliery
12	Barwell Athletic	1–2	Whitwick Colliery
13	Bath City	2–0	Chippenham Town
14	Bedford Avenue	0–4	Wootton Blue Cross
15	Bedworth Town	3–1	Morris Sports
16	Berkhamsted Town	1–1	Bicester Town
17	Betteshanger Colliery Welfare	2–1	Erith & Belvedere
18	Bexhill Town	0–1	Haywards Heath
19	Bideford	7–1	Dartmouth United
20	Bilston	1–3	Wellington Town
21	Birtley	1–4	Gosforth & Coxlodge
22	Blandford United	4–1	Gosport Borough Athletic
23	Boldon Colliery Welfare	1–4	West Stanley
24	Bootle Athletic	2–1	Earle
25	Boston United	3–2	South Normanton Miners Welfare
26	Bourneville Athletic	1–5	Hereford United
27	Bowater Lloyds	4–1	Faversham Town
28	Brentwood & Warley	0–1	Tilbury
29	Bridgwater Town	1–1	Glastonbury
30	Bridlington Central United	6–3	Smith's Dock
31	Brierley Hill Alliance	7–1	Darlaston
32	Brigg Town	4–0	Bentley Colliery
33	Briggs Sports	2–0	Clacton Town
34	Bungay Town	1–4	Leiston
35	Camberley	3–0	Cobham
36	Canterbury City	0–1	Sittingbourne
37	Carshalton Athletic	4–2	Vickers Armstrong
38	Chesham United	5–0	Abingdon Town
39	Cheshunt	2–1	Ware
40	Chingford Town	1–0	Ilford
41	Chippenham United	4–1	Purton
42	Chorley	1–2	Darwen
43	Cinderford Town	2–1	St Philip's Marsh Adult School
44	Clandown	3–0	Calne & Harris United
45	Cleator Moor Celtic	1–0	Holme Head Works
46	Clevedon	5–0	Douglas
47	Clitheroe	1–1	Leyland Motors
48	Coalville Town	2–2	Brush Sports
49	Congleton Town	3–1	Buxton
50	Corsham Town	3–2	Warminster Town
51	Coventry Amateurs	2–3	Atherstone Town
52	Cowes	1–1	Bournemouth
53	Cradley Heath	0–1	Stourbridge
54	Cramlington Welfare	5–1	West Sleekburn Welfare
55	Creswell Colliery	9–0	Staveley Welfare
56	Cromer	0–4	Sudbury Town
57	Cromptons Recreation	2–1	Formby
58	Crook Town	2–2	Ushaw Moor
59	Dawdon Colliery Welfare	1–1	Blackhall Colliery Welfare
60	Devizes Town	4–0	Wootton Bassett Town
61	Dorking w/o-scr Dulwich Hamlet		
62	Dover	1–2	Snowdown Colliery Welfare
63	Droylsden	5–5	Macclesfield
64	Easington Colliery Welfare	3–1	Wingate Welfare
65	East Grinstead	6–1	Littlehampton Town
66	Eastbourne	2–1	Shoreham
67	Eastbourne Comrades	0–0	Newhaven
68	Enfield	5–1	Willesden
69	Eton Manor	2–4	Barking
70	Farsley Celtic	1–0	Appleby Frodingham
71	Filey Town	3–7	Head Wrightsons
72	Fleetwood	3–1	Lytham
73	Flint Town United	2–0	Llandudno
74	Frizington United	5–1	Threlkeld
75	Glossop	1–4	Altrincham
76	Goole Town	5–0	Brodsworth Main Colliery
77	Gorleston	0–1	Eastern Coachworks
78	Grantham	5–1	Heanor Athletic
79	Gravesend & Northfleet	5–2	Sheppey United
80	Great Harwood	1–4	Horwich R M I
81	Great Yarmouth Town	3–2	City Of Norwich School O B U
82	Green Waves	2–3	Truro City
83	Grimethorpe Athletic	1–2	Stocksbridge Works
84	Hanham Athletic	0–2	Troedyrhiw
85	Harwich & Parkeston	5–3	Bishop's Stortford
86	Hatfield Town	1–2	Civil Service
87	Haydock C & B Recreation	1–3	Burscough
88	Hayes	3–0	Southall
89	Headington United	3–4	Slough Town
90	Heaton Stannington	0–3	South Shields
91	Hertford Town	1–3	Wealdstone
92	Hitchin Town	2–1	Marston Shelton Rovers
93	Holt United (Norfolk)	1–4	Thetford Town
94	Horden Colliery Welfare	1–0	Eppleton Colliery Welfare
95	Horsham	4–2	Hove
96	Hoylake Athletic	2–7	Prescot Cables
97	Huntley & Palmers	1–2	Banbury Spencer
98	Hyde United	5–0	Atherton Collieries
99	Ibstock Penistone Rovers	2–0	Tamworth
100	Ilkeston Town	0–4	Long Eaton Town
101	Jump Home Guard	3–3	Parkhouse Colliery
102	Kidderminster Harriers	3–0	Halesowen Town
103	Kilnhurst Colliery	0–3	Beighton Miners Welfare
104	Kingstonian	6–1	Farnham Town
105	Lancaster City	5–1	Barnoldswick & District
106	Lancing Athletic	2–3	Hastings United
107	Langold W M C	2–1	Holbeach United
108	Leatherhead	1–3	Walton & Hersham
109	Leavesden	1–2	Yiewsley
110	Leighton United	5–1	Bedford Queens Works
111	Letchworth Town	2–2	Biggleswade & District
112	Linby Colliery	3–0	Retford Town
113	Llanelli	2–0	Ebbw Vale
114	Lovells Athletic	2–2	Stonehouse
115	Lye Town	2–1	Boldmere St Michaels
116	Maidenhead United	0–2	Wycombe Wanderers
117	Maidstone United	5–2	Ramsgate Athletic
118	Matlock Town	2–4	Stalybridge Celtic
119	Merthyr Tydfil	11–3	Bristol St George
120	Metropolitan Police	4–4	Hounslow Town
121	Millom Town	2–3	Florence & Ullcoats United
122	Milnthorpe Corinthians	5–2	Bowthorn United
123	Moira United	0–1	Lockheed Leamington
124	Morecambe	0–4	Bacup Borough
125	Mount Hill Enterprise	1–1	Hoffman Athletic (Stonehouse)
126	Nantwich	4–3	Ellesmere Port Town
127	Newhall United	2–2	Hinckley Athletic
128	Newport I O W	5–1	Winchester City
129	Newquay	3–0	St Austell
130	Oak Villa	2–6	Barnstaple Town
131	Oswestry Town w/o-scr Shrewsbury Town		
132	Oxford City	5–4	Pressed Steel
133	Parkgate Welfare	2–0	Denaby United
134	Parson Drove	4–1	Wimblington Old Boys
135	Paulton Rovers	1–1	Trowbridge Town
136	Penrith	12–0	Moss Bay
137	Pirelli General Cables	1–2	Hamworthy
138	Potton United	2–6	Bedford Town
139	R A O C Hilsea	0–5	Poole Town
140	Rainham Town	0–0	Crittall Athletic
141	Raleigh Athletic	1–1	Gedling Colliery
142	Ransome & Marles	0–1	Spalding United
143	Rawmarsh Welfare	0–0	Norton Woodseats
144	Romford	7–1	Grays Athletic
145	Romsey Town	3–2	East Cowes Victoria
146	Rufford Colliery	0–2	Shirebrook
147	Runcorn	3–1	Mossley
148	Ryde Sports	3–3	Dorchester Town
149	Selby Town	4–1	South Kirkby Colliery
150	Shaftesbury	1–5	Alton Town
151	Sheringham	0–3	Gothic
152	Shilbottle Colliery Welfare	1–6	Blyth Spartans
153	Shildon	3–5	Evenwood Town
154	Shotton Colliery Welfare	1–8	Consett
155	Silksworth Colliery Welfare	3–3	Tow Law Town
156	Skelmersdale United	1–0	Bangor City
157	Skinnigrove Works	0–5	Whitby Town
158	South Bank East End	1–1	Bridlington Trinity
159	South Liverpool	0–0	Wigan Athletic
160	South Lynn	0–1	Chatteris Town
161	Southwick	1–2	Worthing
162	St Albans City	1–0	Finchley
163	St Blazey	0–6	Ilfracombe Town
164	St Neots & District	5–2	St Ives Town
165	Stafford Rangers	1–2	Dudley Town
166	Steel Peech & Tozer S S	2–0	Maltby Main Colliery
167	Stoneycroft	3–5	Marine
168	Stowmarket Corinthians	7–3	Beccles
169	Street	7–0	Tiverton Town
170	Sutton United	0–0	Tooting & Mitcham United
171	Swindon British Railways	1–5	Welton Rovers
172	Taunton	3–2	Wells City
173	Tufnell Park Edmonton	0–2	Edgware Town
174	West Auckland Town	4–0	South Hetton Colliery Welfare
175	Westbury United	1–6	Salisbury
176	Whitstable	0–2	Ashford
177	Whitton United	1–3	Lowestoft Town
178	Wimbledon	9–3	Guildford
179	Winsford United	2–0	Ashton United
180	Winterton Rangers	1–3	Ossett Town
181	Wisbech Town	1–0	Bury Town
182	Wolverton Town & B R	6–3	Vauxhall Motors
183	Woodford Town	4–0	Clapton
184	Yorkshire Amateur	2–0	Marsden

=== Replays ===
Tie	Home team	Score	Away team
2	Hexham Hearts w/o-scr Amble		
6	Uxbridge	1–1	Aylesbury United
16	Bicester Town	2–1	Berkhamsted Town
29	Glastonbury	7–0	Bridgwater Town
47	Leyland Motors	2–0	Clitheroe
48	Brush Sports	2–1	Coalville Town
52	Bournemouth	4–2	Cowes
58	Ushaw Moor	3–2	Crook Town
59	Blackhall Colliery Welfare	3–1	Dawdon Colliery Welfare
63	Macclesfield	7–2	Droylsden
67	Newhaven	3–0	Eastbourne Comrades
101	Parkhouse Colliery	7–1	Jump Home Guard
111	Biggleswade & District	3–2	Letchworth Town
114	Stonehouse	1–0	Lovells Athletic
120	Metropolitan Police	1–2	Hounslow Town
125	Hoffman Athletic (Stonehouse)	2–1	Mount Hill Enterprise
127	Hinckley Athletic	2–1	Newhall United
135	Trowbridge Town	4–1	Paulton Rovers
140	Crittall Athletic	2–1	Rainham Town
141	Gedling Colliery	8–1	Raleigh Athletic
143	Norton Woodseats	4–2	Rawmarsh Welfare
148	Dorchester Town	4–2	Ryde Sports
155	Tow Law Town	2–0	Silksworth Colliery Welfare
158	Bridlington Trinity	4–2	South Bank East End
159	Wigan Athletic	3–2	South Liverpool
170	Tooting & Mitcham United	1–0	Sutton United

=== 2nd replay ===
Tie	Home team	Score	Away team
6	Aylesbury United	4–1	Uxbridge

== 1st qualifying round ==
=== Ties ===
Tie	Home team	Score	Away team
1	Alton Town	9–0	Hamworthy
2	Altrincham	3–1	Macclesfield
3	Arundel	0–2	Hastings United
4	Ashby Institute	0–3	Brigg Town
5	Ashington	2–1	West Stanley
6	Atherstone Town	2–4	Lockheed Leamington
7	Bacup Borough	2–0	Darwen
8	Banbury Spencer	4–0	Bicester Town
9	Barking	2–2	Briggs Sports
10	Beighton Miners Welfare	1–1	Worksop Town
11	Betteshanger Colliery Welfare	2–1	Ashford
12	Bideford	2–2	Barnstaple Town
13	Biggleswade & District	1–2	Wootton Blue Cross
14	Blandford United	6–2	Bournemouth
15	Bowater Lloyds	1–1	Snowdown Colliery Welfare
16	Bridlington Central United	4–5	Head Wrightsons
17	Brush Sports	5–2	Whitwick Colliery
18	Burscough	2–0	Bootle Athletic
19	Carshalton Athletic	1–0	Hounslow Town
20	Chatteris Town	0–2	Newmarket Town
21	Chesham United	1–1	Wycombe Wanderers
22	Chingford Town	3–2	Crittall Athletic
23	Cinderford Town	0–2	Barry Town
24	Civil Service	2–5	Enfield
25	Clandown	2–0	Devizes Town
26	Clevedon	2–2	Llanelli
27	Cramlington Welfare	5–2	Gosforth & Coxlodge
28	Dudley Town	0–0	Stourbridge
29	Eastbourne	3–2	Horsham
30	Eastern Coachworks	2–2	Sudbury Town
31	Evenwood Town	3–2	Easington Colliery Welfare
32	Farsley Celtic	3–1	Frickley Colliery
33	Florence & Ullcoats United	2–5	Aspatria Spartans
34	Frizington United w/o-scr Kells Welfare Centre		
35	Grantham	0–0	Boston United
36	Great Yarmouth Town	3–0	Gothic
37	Gresley Rovers	0–2	Bedworth Town
38	Hayes	7–1	Cheshunt
39	Hendon	7–1	Edgware Town
40	Hexham Hearts	2–1	Alnwick Town
41	Hinckley Athletic	4–0	Ibstock Penistone Rovers
42	Histon Institute	1–0	Parson Drove
43	Horden Colliery Welfare	4–0	Consett
44	Huntingdon United	1–5	Hitchin Town
45	Kidderminster Harriers	0–1	Hereford United
46	King's Lynn	2–2	Abbey United
47	Kingstonian	4–0	Dorking
48	Langold W M C	5–1	Long Eaton Town
49	Leighton United	2–8	Bedford Town
50	Leiston	0–1	Lowestoft Town
51	Leyland Motors	1–1	Fleetwood
52	Linby Colliery	2–0	Shirebrook
53	Marine	0–1	Cromptons Recreation
54	Merthyr Tydfil	7–0	Hoffman Athletic (Stonehouse)
55	Milnthorpe Corinthians	0–5	Netherfield
56	Nelson	5–2	Lancaster City
57	Newhaven	1–2	East Grinstead
58	Newport I O W	6–6	Poole Town
59	Newquay	5–2	Ilfracombe Town
60	Norton Woodseats	9–0	Steel Peech & Tozer S S
61	Ossett Town	1–3	Selby Town
62	Oswestry Town	2–1	Lye Town
63	Parkgate Welfare	0–2	Stocksbridge Works
64	Parkhouse Colliery	1–2	Creswell Colliery
65	Penrith	1–2	Cleator Moor Celtic
66	Peterborough United	3–0	Symingtons Recreation
67	Romford	5–1	Tilbury
68	Romsey Town	1–1	Dorchester Town
69	Rossendale United	6–5	Horwich R M I
70	Runcorn	4–1	Nantwich
71	Rushden Town	2–2	Kettering Town
72	Salisbury	2–1	Chippenham United
73	Scarborough	7–2	Bridlington Trinity
74	Sittingbourne	2–0	Maidstone United
75	Skelmersdale United	6–2	Prescot Cables
76	Slough Town	2–2	Oxford City
77	South Shields	0–2	Blyth Spartans
78	South Shields St Peters	1–4	South Bank
79	Spalding United	8–0	Gedling Colliery
80	Stalybridge Celtic	2–6	Hyde United
81	Stonehouse	3–1	Troedyrhiw
82	Stowmarket Corinthians	5–0	Thetford Town
83	Street	3–0	Taunton
84	Tonbridge	1–0	Gravesend & Northfleet
85	Tooting & Mitcham United	3–2	Camberley
86	Tow Law Town	3–2	West Auckland Town
87	Trowbridge Town	6–1	Corsham Town
88	Truro City	2–4	Glastonbury
89	Ushaw Moor	1–3	Blackhall Colliery Welfare
90	Wealdstone	1–5	St Albans City
91	Wellingborough Town	2–0	Desborough Town
92	Wellington Town	3–1	Brierley Hill Alliance
93	Welton Rovers	2–1	Bath City
94	Whitby Town	10–2	Cargo Fleet Works
95	Wigan Athletic	1–1	Flint Town United
96	Wimbledon	0–2	Walton & Hersham
97	Winsford United	4–0	Congleton Town
98	Wisbech Town	0–2	March Town United
99	Wolverton Town & B R	3–2	St Neots & District
100	Woodford Town	3–2	Harwich & Parkeston
101	Worthing	1–2	Haywards Heath
102	Yiewsley	2–2	Aylesbury United
103	Yorkshire Amateur	0–4	Goole Town

=== Replays ===
Tie	Home team	Score	Away team
9	Briggs Sports	2–1	Barking
10	Worksop Town	5–3	Beighton Miners Welfare
12	Barnstaple Town	3–1	Bideford
15	Snowdown Colliery Welfare	2–0	Bowater Lloyds
21	Wycombe Wanderers	4–2	Chesham United
26	Llanelli	7–1	Clevedon
28	Stourbridge	1–3	Dudley Town
30	Sudbury Town	0–1	Eastern Coachworks
35	Boston United	4–1	Grantham
46	Abbey United	0–1	King's Lynn
51	Fleetwood	2–4	Leyland Motors
58	Poole Town	1–0	Newport I O W
68	Dorchester Town	2–0	Romsey Town
71	Kettering Town	4–0	Rushden Town
76	Oxford City	1–2	Slough Town
95	Flint Town United	1–3	Wigan Athletic
102	Aylesbury United	2–0	Yiewsley

== 2nd qualifying round ==
=== Ties ===
Tie	Home team	Score	Away team
1	Alton Town	9–0	Blandford United
2	Altrincham	3–2	Winsford United
3	Ashington	0–0	Hexham Hearts
4	Aylesbury United	0–2	Wycombe Wanderers
5	Bacup Borough	3–2	Rossendale United
6	Banbury Spencer	1–1	Slough Town
7	Bedford Town	3–1	Wolverton Town & B R
8	Betteshanger Colliery Welfare	0–0	Snowdown Colliery Welfare
9	Boston United	0–4	Linby Colliery
10	Brush Sports	3–2	Bedworth Town
11	Burscough	3–2	Skelmersdale United
12	Carshalton Athletic	1–1	Kingstonian
13	Cleator Moor Celtic	8–3	Aspatria Spartans
14	Corby Town	5–0	Wellingborough Town
15	Cramlington Welfare	2–0	Blyth Spartans
16	Dudley Town	0–1	Oswestry Town
17	East Grinstead	1–5	Haywards Heath
18	Eastbourne	5–4	Hastings United
19	Eastern Coachworks	1–1	Lowestoft Town
20	Enfield	2–0	St Albans City
21	Frizington United	1–2	Netherfield
22	Glastonbury	3–0	Barnstaple Town
23	Goole Town	3–1	Brigg Town
24	Great Yarmouth Town	2–1	Stowmarket Corinthians
25	Hendon	2–0	Hayes
26	Hinckley Athletic	7–0	Lockheed Leamington
27	Horden Colliery Welfare	4–0	Evenwood Town
28	Kettering Town	2–2	Peterborough United
29	King's Lynn	6–0	March Town United
30	Llanelli	5–5	Merthyr Tydfil
31	Nelson	4–1	Leyland Motors
32	Newmarket Town	1–3	Histon Institute
33	Newquay	1–2	Street
34	Norton Woodseats	1–3	Worksop Town
35	Poole Town	1–3	Dorchester Town
36	Romford	2–2	Briggs Sports
37	Runcorn	1–1	Hyde United
38	Salisbury	4–2	Clandown
39	Scarborough	3–2	South Bank
40	Selby Town	2–3	Farsley Celtic
41	Spalding United	2–2	Langold W M C
42	Stocksbridge Works	6–3	Creswell Colliery
43	Stonehouse	1–1	Barry Town
44	Tonbridge	3–1	Sittingbourne
45	Tooting & Mitcham United	2–1	Walton & Hersham
46	Tow Law Town	0–0	Blackhall Colliery Welfare
47	Wellington Town	1–4	Hereford United
48	Welton Rovers	0–2	Trowbridge Town
49	Whitby Town	4–2	Head Wrightsons
50	Wigan Athletic	1–0	Cromptons Recreation
51	Woodford Town	1–1	Chingford Town
52	Wootton Blue Cross	3–4	Hitchin Town

=== Replays ===
Tie	Home team	Score	Away team
3	Hexham Hearts	2–6	Ashington
6	Slough Town	5–1	Banbury Spencer
8	Snowdown Colliery Welfare	1–0	Betteshanger Colliery Welfare
12	Kingstonian	2–4	Carshalton Athletic
19	Lowestoft Town	2–1	Eastern Coachworks
28	Peterborough United	1–2	Kettering Town
30	Merthyr Tydfil	1–2	Llanelli
36	Briggs Sports	1–2	Romford
37	Hyde United	3–0	Runcorn
41	Langold W M C	1–2	Spalding United
43	Barry Town	3–2	Stonehouse
46	Blackhall Colliery Welfare	3–0	Tow Law Town
51	Chingford Town	0–4	Woodford Town

== 3rd qualifying round ==
=== Ties ===
Tie	Home team	Score	Away team
1	Alton Town	2–2	Dorchester Town
2	Ashington	3–1	Cramlington Welfare
3	Bacup Borough	0–2	Nelson
4	Burscough	0–2	Wigan Athletic
5	Carshalton Athletic	1–3	Tooting & Mitcham United
6	Cleator Moor Celtic	2–1	Netherfield
7	Corby Town	1–5	Kettering Town
8	Eastbourne	4–2	Haywards Heath
9	Enfield	2–4	Hendon
10	Farsley Celtic	3–2	Goole Town
11	Hinckley Athletic	0–1	Brush Sports
12	Hitchin Town	2–3	Bedford Town
13	Horden Colliery Welfare	4–1	Blackhall Colliery Welfare
14	Hyde United	1–1	Altrincham
15	King's Lynn	3–1	Histon Institute
16	Llanelli	1–1	Barry Town
17	Lowestoft Town	1–2	Great Yarmouth Town
18	Oswestry Town	1–2	Hereford United
19	Salisbury	1–0	Trowbridge Town
20	Scarborough	3–0	Whitby Town
21	Slough Town	1–1	Wycombe Wanderers
22	Spalding United	2–2	Linby Colliery
23	Street	0–1	Glastonbury
24	Tonbridge	1–1	Snowdown Colliery Welfare
25	Woodford Town	2–2	Romford
26	Worksop Town	1–2	Stocksbridge Works

=== Replays ===
Tie	Home team	Score	Away team
1	Dorchester Town	1–0	Alton Town
14	Altrincham	1–2	Hyde United
16	Barry Town	1–2	Llanelli
21	Wycombe Wanderers	2–0	Slough Town
22	Linby Colliery	3–1	Spalding United
24	Snowdown Colliery Welfare	3–6	Tonbridge
25	Romford	1–1	Woodford Town

=== 2nd replay ===
Tie	Home team	Score	Away team
25	Romford	1–2	Woodford Town

== 4th qualifying round ==
The teams that entered in this round are: Colchester United, Scunthorpe United, Yeovil Town, Bromley, Leytonstone, Bishop Auckland, Cheltenham Town, Guildford City, Chelmsford City, Gainsborough Trinity, Stockton, Workington, Walthamstow Avenue, Dartford, Witton Albion, Worcester City, Weymouth, Gloucester City, North Shields, Billingham Synthonia. Rhyl, Northwich Victoria, Bromsgrove Rovers and Nuneaton Borough.

=== Ties ===
Tie	Home team	Score	Away team
1	Ashington	2–1	Farsley Celtic
2	Billingham Synthonia	1–3	Scarborough
3	Bishop Auckland	2–0	Horden Colliery Welfare
4	Bromley	3–1	Leytonstone
5	Bromsgrove Rovers	3–2	Kettering Town
6	Dorchester Town	1–4	Glastonbury
7	Gainsborough Trinity	3–1	Brush Sports
8	Gloucester City	2–1	Salisbury
9	Guildford City	0–0	Bedford Town
10	Hereford United	1–0	Scunthorpe & Lindsey United
11	Hyde United	2–2	Nelson
12	King's Lynn	1–1	Dartford
13	Linby Colliery	3–1	Nuneaton Borough
14	Llanelli	5–0	Weymouth
15	Rhyl	0–0	Wigan Athletic
16	Stocksbridge Works	2–2	Worcester City
17	Stockton	0–1	North Shields
18	Tonbridge	3–3	Hendon
19	Tooting & Mitcham United	5–3	Great Yarmouth Town
20	Walthamstow Avenue	2–0	Eastbourne
21	Witton Albion	4–2	Northwich Victoria
22	Woodford Town	1–7	Colchester United
23	Workington	0–1	Cleator Moor Celtic
24	Wycombe Wanderers	0–4	Chelmsford City
25	Yeovil Town	2–4	Cheltenham Town

=== Replays ===
Tie	Home team	Score	Away team
9	Bedford Town	1–2	Guildford City
11	Nelson	3–0	Hyde United
12	Dartford	3–0	King's Lynn
15	Wigan Athletic	2–3	Rhyl
16	Worcester City	3–0	Stocksbridge Works
18	Hendon	1–2	Tonbridge

== 1950–51 FA Cup ==
See 1950–51 FA Cup for details of the rounds from the first round proper onwards.
