= 1947–48 FA Cup qualifying rounds =

Tournament details
- Country: England; Wales

The 1947–48 FA Cup is the 67th season of the Football Association Challenge Cup, or FA Cup for short. The large number of clubs entering the tournament from lower down the English football league system meant that the competition started with a number of preliminary and qualifying rounds. The 25 victorious teams from the fourth round qualifying progressed to the first round proper.

== Extra preliminary round ==
=== Ties ===
Tie	Home team	Score	Away team
1	Abingdon Town	2–4	Aylesbury United
2	Andover	7–0	Pirelli General Cables
3	Appleby Frodingham	4–1	Dinnington Athletic
4	Armthorpe Welfare	3–1	Matlock Town
5	Banbury Spencer	5–0	Oxford City
6	Barton Town	3–4	Grimethorpe Athletic
7	Bentley Colliery	2–4	Winterton Rangers
8	Betteshanger Colliery Welfare	3–2	Aylesford Paper Mills
9	Blackhall Colliery Welfare	2–1	Willington
10	Chippenham Town	4–2	Odd Down
11	Civil Service	2–0	Harlow Town
12	Clapton	2–1	Rainham Town
13	Cockermouth	6–1	Pica
14	Cowes	1–3	Newport I O W
15	Dawdon Colliery Welfare	0–0	Horden Colliery Welfare
16	Droylsden	2–0	Wilmslow Albion
17	Easington Colliery Welfare	4–1	Shotton Colliery Welfare
18	Edgware Town	9–0	Acton Town
19	Frome Town	1–2	Welton Rovers
20	Harworth Colliery Athletic	7–3	Pilkington Recreation
21	Hemel Hempstead	3–4	Berkhamsted Town
22	Henley Town	1–7	Lyons Club
23	Leavesden	7–1	Willesden
24	Lloyds (Sittingbourne)	2–4	Chatham Town
25	Lymington	1–2	Portland United
26	Marlow	0–2	Maidenhead United
27	Monckton Athletic	1–2	Brodsworth Main Colliery
28	Murton Colliery Welfare	2–2	Stanley United
29	Pinner	2–0	Saffron Walden Town
30	Pressed Steel	0–3	Huntley & Palmers
31	Redford Sports	0–5	Southall
32	Sawbridgeworth	4–1	Crown & Manor
33	Sittingbourne	3–4	Bexley
34	Tufnell Park	4–3	Royston Town
35	Upminster	0–1	Grays Athletic
36	Wallingford Town	4–2	Chesham United
37	Ware	2–3	Edmonton Borough
38	Warminster Town	3–4	Clandown
39	Welwyn Garden City	1–5	Enfield
40	West Thurrock Athletic	3–0	Ford Sports (Dagenham)
41	Weymouth	4–1	Longfleet St Mary's
42	Whitstable w/o-scr Chatham		
43	Winchester City	0–1	Salisbury
44	Wombwell Athletic	4–3	Firbeck Main Colliery
45	Wood Green Town	1–4	Chipperfield
46	Wootton Bassett Town	0–2	Pewsey Vale
47	Wycombe Wanderers	4–2	Hounslow Town
48	Yiewsley	3–3	Windsor & Eton

=== Replays ===
Tie	Home team	Score	Away team
15	Horden Colliery Welfare	9–0	Dawdon Colliery Welfare
28	Stanley United	2–2	Murton Colliery Welfare
48	Windsor & Eton	3–2	Yiewsley

=== 2nd replay ===
Tie	Home team	Score	Away team
28	Stanley United	1–2	Murton Colliery Welfare

== Preliminary round ==
=== Ties ===
Tie	Home team	Score	Away team
1	Annfield Plain	5–2	Amble
2	Appleby	3–9	Milnthorpe Corinthians
3	Arlesey Town	2–0	Leighton Town
4	Armthorpe Welfare	1–4	Norton Woodseats
5	Ashford	4–1	Whitstable
6	Ashton United	2–0	Winsford United
7	Banbury Spencer	8–2	Osberton Radiator
8	Barry Town	2–0	Aberaman & Aberdare
9	Bedford Queens Works	1–8	Letchworth Town
10	Bedford Town	7–4	Eynesbury Rovers
11	Betteshanger Colliery Welfare	2–1	Woolwich Polytechnic
12	Bicester Town	1–3	Metal & Produce Recovery
13	Biggleswade & District	9–1	St Neots & District
14	Birtley	0–2	Blyth Spartans
15	Bitterne Nomads	2–3	Thornycroft Athletic
16	Boldmere St Michaels	0–1	Hednesford Town
17	Boots Athletic	0–4	Ilkeston Town
18	Bournemouth Gasworks Athletic	4–0	Portland United
19	Bourneville Athletic	0–3	Birmingham City Transport
20	Bowthorn United	2–2	Kells Welfare Centre
21	Bradford United	1–0	Luddendenfoot
22	Brodsworth Main Colliery	3–4	Rawmarsh Welfare
23	Burscough	3–1	Bangor City
24	Buxton	6–1	Macclesfield
25	Chichester City	5–2	Eastbourne Comrades
26	Chilton Athletic	2–3	Shildon
27	Congleton Town	3–3	Witton Albion
28	Crittall Athletic	3–2	Tilbury
29	Crook Colliery Welfare	1–2	Murton Colliery Welfare
30	Dagenham British Legion	4–1	London Transport
31	Darlaston	1–2	Worcester City
32	Dartford	3–2	Erith & Belvedere
33	De Havilland (Bolton)	1–3	Morecambe
34	Devizes Town	4–0	Purton
35	Dover	1–5	Gravesend & Northfleet
36	Earlestown	3–0	Haydock C & B Recreation
37	Easington Colliery Welfare	2–0	Brandon Colliery Welfare
38	East Grinstead	5–2	Newhaven
39	Ebbw Vale	2–0	Hoffman Athletic (Stonehouse)
40	Edgware Town	7–0	Pinner
41	Ellesmere Port Town	3–0	Lostock Gralam
42	Epsom	4–3	Brookwood Hospital
43	Eton Manor	2–3	Ekco
44	Ferryhill Athletic	3–2	Consett
45	Filey Town	3–2	South Bank East End
46	Finchley	3–2	Civil Service
47	Fleetwood	7–1	Great Harwood
48	Florence & Ullcoats United	1–3	Frizington United
49	Fodens Motor Works	1–2	Hyde United
50	Folkestone	6–0	Callender Athletic
51	Formby	0–4	Wigan Athletic
52	Gedling Colliery	6–1	Holbeach United
53	Gloucester City	2–4	Hanham Athletic
54	Gorleston	2–4	Whitton United
55	Gosport Borough Athletic	2–0	East Cowes Victoria
56	Grays Athletic	3–2	Ilford
57	Grimethorpe Athletic w/o-scr Thurnscoe		
58	Guisborough	4–1	Cargo Fleet Works
59	Halesowen Town	4–1	Cradley Heath
60	Harrow Town	4–0	Tufnell Park
61	Harworth Colliery Athletic	4–1	Wombwell Athletic
62	Hastings & St Leonards	1–2	Horsham
63	Hayes	3–1	Windsor & Eton
64	Headington United	4–0	Wallingford Town
65	Hereford United	11–0	Thynnes Athletic
66	Histon Institute	6–4	Abbey United
67	Hitchin Town	8–0	Waterlows
68	Hoddesdon Town	5–3	Edmonton Borough
69	Horden Colliery Welfare	2–0	Spennymoor United
70	Huntley & Palmers	4–1	Aylesbury United
71	Kempston Rovers	4–1	Bedford Avenue
72	Leyton	1–2	Harwich & Parkeston
73	Llandudno	2–7	Earle
74	Llanelli	3–0	Cardiff Corinthians
75	Lowca	3–2	Penrith
76	Lysaghts Sports	4–1	Kiveton Park Colliery
77	Lytham	0–1	Bacup Borough
78	Maidenhead United	7–2	Lyons Club
79	Maidstone United	3–4	Ramsgate Athletic
80	Maltby Main Colliery	1–4	Appleby Frodingham
81	March Town	4–2	Wisbech Town
82	Margate	3–0	Chatham Town
83	Merthyr Tydfil	2–1	Clevedon
84	Metropolitan Police	4–6	Walton & Hersham
85	Moor Green	2–7	Stafford Rangers
86	Nantwich	1–8	Altrincham
87	Netherfield	10–2	Cockermouth
88	Newbiggin Colliery Welfare	1–5	West Stanley
89	Newport I O W	5–2	Weymouth
90	Newton Y M C A	1–2	Orrell
91	Northwich Victoria	8–1	Wheelock Albion
92	Norwich C E Y M S	0–0	Cromer
93	Ossett Town	5–1	Meltham Mills
94	Oswestry Town	1–4	Bromsgrove Rovers
95	Parton United	3–1	Cleator Moor Celtic
96	Paulton Rovers	5–1	Radstock Town
97	Peasedown Miners Welfare	2–3	Clandown
98	Poole Town	3–2	Bournemouth
99	Redhill	9–0	Guildford
100	Rhyl	10–0	Crossens
101	Romford	1–3	Barking
102	Salisbury	5–1	Basingstoke Town
103	Salisbury Corinthians	1–2	Andover
104	Sandown	2–2	Ryde Sports
105	Sawbridgeworth	1–6	Berkhamsted Town
106	Scalegill	1–0	Moss Bay
107	Scunthorpe & Lindsey United	5–1	Sheffield
108	Seaham Colliery Welfare	5–1	Langley Park Colliery Welfare
109	Sheppey United	3–2	Bexley
110	Skelmersdale United	8–0	Stoneycroft
111	Slough United	0–1	Southall
112	Soundwell	2–0	Bristol Aeroplane Company
113	South Shields	13–0	Radcliffe Welfare United
114	Spalding United	3–2	Ollerton Colliery
115	St Albans City	1–0	Chipperfield
116	St Helens Town	0–1	Prescot Cables
117	St Philip's Marsh Adult School	1–5	Lovells Athletic
118	Stamford	4–0	Bourne Town
119	Stonehouse	4–7	Weston Super Mare St Johns
120	Stourbridge	1–0	Dudley Town
121	Swindon G W R Corinthians	2–1	Pewsey Vale
122	Swindon Victoria	4–2	Melksham
123	Tow Law Town	4–6	Evenwood Town
124	Twickenham	1–3	Leavesden
125	Upton Colliery	1–3	Goole Town
126	Vauxhall Motors	7–1	Stewartby Works
127	Wealdstone	2–0	Enfield
128	Welton Rovers	0–2	Trowbridge Town
129	West Auckland Town	5–3	Blackhall Colliery Welfare
130	West Thurrock Athletic	4–1	Clapton
131	Westbury United	3–0	Chippenham Town
132	Whitby Albion Rangers	2–0	South Bank St Peters
133	William Colliery	8–2	Distington
134	Wiltshire County Mental Hospital	4–0	Dilton Rovers
135	Winterton Rangers	1–2	Denaby United
136	Woking	2–0	Leatherhead
137	Wolverton Town	4–2	Luton Amateur
138	Woodford Town	1–8	Brentwood & Warley
139	Wycombe Wanderers	3–1	Uxbridge
140	Youlgrave	6–6	Droylsden

=== Replays ===
Tie	Home team	Score	Away team
20	Kells Welfare Centre	1–3	Bowthorn United
27	Witton Albion	7–0	Congleton Town
92	Cromer	1–3	Norwich C E Y M S
104	Ryde Sports	4–1	Sandown
140	Droylsden	2–1	Youlgrave

== 1st qualifying round ==
=== Ties ===
Tie	Home team	Score	Away team
1	Altrincham	4–1	Hyde United
2	Annfield Plain	2–4	South Shields
3	Ashington	4–3	West Stanley
4	Ashton United	2–6	Witton Albion
5	Bacup Borough	2–3	Morecambe
6	Barking	3–1	Crittall Athletic
7	Basford United	3–1	Stamford
8	Bedford Town	2–0	Arlesey Town
9	Berkhamsted Town	3–4	Harrow Town
10	Biggleswade & District	4–5	Kempston Rovers
11	Billingham Synthonia	1–3	Portrack Shamrocks
12	Blyth Spartans	4–0	Throckley
13	Bognor Regis Town	1–1	Shoreham
14	Boston United	5–3	Gedling Colliery
15	Bournemouth Gasworks Athletic	0–3	Gosport Borough Athletic
16	Bowthorn United	4–2	Lowca
17	Bradford United	4–2	South Kirkby Colliery
18	Bromsgrove Rovers	3–2	Worcester City
19	Burscough	0–3	Rhyl
20	Buxton	2–0	Northwich Victoria
21	Cambridge Town	3–1	King's Lynn
22	Chatteris Town	2–5	Bury Town
23	Coalville Town	1–0	Atherstone Town
24	Darwen	1–3	Fleetwood
25	Denaby United	4–1	Appleby Frodingham
26	Desborough Town	1–0	Stewarts & Lloyds
27	Earlestown	0–1	Wigan Athletic
28	East Grinstead	7–1	Bexhill Town
29	Ebbw Vale	3–2	Llanelli
30	Ekco	3–0	Dagenham British Legion
31	Ellesmere Port Town	2–2	Droylsden
32	Evenwood Town	3–1	Seaham Colliery Welfare
33	Ferryhill Athletic	1–0	Shildon
34	Folkestone	5–1	Betteshanger Colliery Welfare
35	Frickley Colliery	1–3	Selby Town
36	Goole Town	3–1	Ossett Town
37	Gothic	3–1	Sheringham
38	Gravesend & Northfleet	4–0	Ashford
39	Grays Athletic	3–0	West Thurrock Athletic
40	Gresley Rovers	3–2	Nuneaton Borough
41	Grimethorpe Athletic	4–2	Lysaghts Sports
42	Guisborough	1–2	Whitby Albion Rangers
43	Halesowen Town	2–1	Birmingham City Transport
44	Harwich & Parkeston	1–4	Brentwood & Warley
45	Harworth Colliery Athletic	0–1	Norton Woodseats
46	Hednesford Town	2–3	Stourbridge
47	Hereford United	2–1	Stafford Rangers
48	Histon Institute	3–2	Parson Drove
49	Hoddesdon Town	1–2	Edgware Town
50	Horsham	1–1	Haywards Heath
51	Ilkeston Town	2–1	Ransome & Marles
52	Kingstonian	10–1	Epsom
53	Leavesden	2–1	St Albans City
54	Leiston	8–2	Old Grammarians
55	Leyland Motors	1–2	Horwich R M I
56	Maidenhead United	5–2	Huntley & Palmers
57	Margate	0–3	Dartford
58	Merthyr Tydfil	9–0	Hanham Athletic
59	Metal & Produce Recovery	0–3	Banbury Spencer
60	Moira United	1–3	Brush Sports
61	Murton Colliery Welfare	2–3	Easington Colliery Welfare
62	Nelson	2–1	Chorley
63	Netherfield	5–1	Scalegill
64	Newburn	2–0	Gosforth & Coxlodge
65	Newmarket Town	2–3	March Town
66	Norwich C E Y M S	1–6	Great Yarmouth Town
67	Orrell	0–6	Prescot Cables
68	Parton United	3–2	Frizington United
69	Paulton Rovers	4–3	Clandown (Match declared void)
70	Peterborough Westwood Works	0–5	Peterborough United
71	Plymouth United	1–2	Dartmouth United
72	Poole Town	2–1	Andover
73	Ramsgate Athletic	4–2	Sheppey United
74	Ryde Sports	3–0	Thornycroft Athletic
75	Salisbury	0–0	Newport I O W
76	Scunthorpe & Lindsey United	8–0	Rawmarsh Welfare
77	Skelmersdale United	3–2	Earle
78	Soundwell	0–10	Barry Town
79	South Bank	2–3	Stockton
80	Southall	2–1	Headington United
81	Spalding United	0–4	Grantham
82	St Austell	2–1	Glastonbury
83	Street	9–1	Somerton Amateurs
84	Sutton United	1–3	Carshalton Athletic
85	Swindon G W R Corinthians	1–4	Westbury United
86	Tamworth	6–0	Ibstock Penistone Rovers
87	Trowbridge Town	4–1	Devizes Town
88	Vauxhall Motors	2–2	Letchworth Town
89	Walton & Hersham	2–2	Redhill
90	Wealdstone	5–4	Finchley
91	Wellingborough Town	0–3	Rushden Town
92	Wells City	0–1	Newton Abbot Spurs
93	West Auckland Town	1–0	Horden Colliery Welfare
94	Weston Super Mare St Johns	1–4	Lovells Athletic
95	Whitby	4–2	Filey Town
96	Whitton United	3–5	Lowestoft Town
97	William Colliery	3–4	Milnthorpe Corinthians
98	Wiltshire County Mental Hospital	5–3	Swindon Victoria
99	Woking	2–3	Tooting & Mitcham United
100	Wolverton Town	1–2	Hitchin Town
101	Worthing	3–2	Chichester City
102	Wycombe Wanderers	1–0	Hayes
103	Yorkshire Amateur	0–0	Thorne Colliery

=== Replays ===
Tie	Home team	Score	Away team
13	Shoreham	2–5	Bognor Regis Town
31	Droylsden	3–1	Ellesmere Port Town
50	Haywards Heath	3–8	Horsham
69	Clandown	4–1	Paulton Rovers
75	Newport I O W	2–0	Salisbury
88	Letchworth Town	1–5	Vauxhall Motors
89	Redhill	2–1	Walton & Hersham
103	Thorne Colliery	4–3	Yorkshire Amateur

== 2nd qualifying round ==
=== Ties ===
Tie	Home team	Score	Away team
1	Altrincham	4–1	Droylsden
2	Banbury Spencer	4–0	Maidenhead United
3	Barking	0–0	Brentwood & Warley
4	Barry Town	2–0	Ebbw Vale
5	Bognor Regis Town	1–3	Worthing
6	Bowthorn United	3–4	Parton United
7	Bromsgrove Rovers	1–1	Halesowen Town
8	Brush Sports	3–1	Tamworth
9	Bury Town	2–1	Cambridge Town
10	Desborough Town	1–2	Peterborough United
11	Edgware Town	1–2	Wealdstone
12	Ferryhill Athletic	4–0	Evenwood Town
13	Fleetwood	2–0	Morecambe
14	Folkestone	4–1	Ramsgate Athletic
15	Goole Town	2–0	Thorne Colliery
16	Gosport Borough Athletic	5–2	Newport I O W
17	Gothic	3–1	Leiston
18	Grantham	7–0	Basford United
19	Gravesend & Northfleet	0–1	Dartford
20	Grays Athletic	1–0	Ekco
21	Gresley Rovers	3–0	Coalville Town
22	Hitchin Town	2–3	Bedford Town
23	Horsham	5–2	East Grinstead
24	Ilkeston Town	1–0	Boston United
25	Kempston Rovers	1–2	Vauxhall Motors
26	Kingstonian	0–2	Tooting & Mitcham United
27	Leavesden	3–2	Harrow Town
28	Lowestoft Town	2–3	Great Yarmouth Town
29	March Town	1–0	Histon Institute
30	Merthyr Tydfil	2–1	Lovells Athletic
31	Nelson	4–1	Horwich R M I
32	Netherfield	4–1	Milnthorpe Corinthians
33	Newburn	1–5	Blyth Spartans
34	Newton Abbot Spurs	2–4	Street
35	Norton Woodseats	7–1	Grimethorpe Athletic
36	Portrack Shamrocks	0–1	Whitby
37	Prescot Cables	1–1	Skelmersdale United
38	Redhill	5–2	Carshalton Athletic
39	Rushden Town	1–2	Kettering Town
40	Ryde Sports	2–1	Poole Town
41	Scunthorpe & Lindsey United	1–0	Denaby United
42	Selby Town	3–1	Bradford United
43	South Shields	3–1	Ashington
44	Southall	3–3	Wycombe Wanderers
45	St Austell	5–2	Dartmouth United
46	Stockton	8–1	Whitby Albion Rangers
47	Stourbridge	4–0	Hereford United
48	Trowbridge Town	4–3	Clandown
49	West Auckland Town	0–1	Easington Colliery Welfare
50	Wigan Athletic	2–1	Rhyl
51	Wiltshire County Mental Hospital	1–3	Westbury United
52	Witton Albion	6–3	Buxton

=== Replays ===
Tie	Home team	Score	Away team
3	Brentwood & Warley	2–3	Barking
7	Halesowen Town	1–2	Bromsgrove Rovers
37	Skelmersdale United	0–3	Prescot Cables
44	Wycombe Wanderers	1–2	Southall

== 3rd qualifying round ==
=== Ties ===
Tie	Home team	Score	Away team
1	Barking	0–2	Grays Athletic
2	Barry Town	3–4	Merthyr Tydfil
3	Blyth Spartans	0–3	South Shields
4	Bromsgrove Rovers	2–0	Stourbridge
5	Brush Sports	5–1	Gresley Rovers
6	Bury Town	3–0	March Town
7	Dartford	1–0	Folkestone
8	Easington Colliery Welfare	3–3	Ferryhill Athletic
9	Fleetwood	1–1	Nelson
10	Gosport Borough Athletic	1–2	Ryde Sports
11	Gothic	2–3	Great Yarmouth Town
12	Grantham	11–1	Ilkeston Town
13	Horsham	1–0	Worthing
14	Kettering Town	3–4	Peterborough United
15	Leavesden	1–3	Wealdstone
16	Parton United	1–4	Netherfield
17	Redhill	1–0	Tooting & Mitcham United
18	Scunthorpe & Lindsey United	2–1	Norton Woodseats
19	Selby Town	0–5	Goole Town
20	Southall	3–4	Banbury Spencer
21	St Austell	1–2	Street
22	Vauxhall Motors	1–1	Bedford Town
23	Westbury United	0–3	Trowbridge Town
24	Whitby	1–3	Stockton
25	Wigan Athletic	3–0	Prescot Cables
26	Witton Albion	4–2	Altrincham

=== Replays ===
Tie	Home team	Score	Away team
8	Ferryhill Athletic	3–1	Easington Colliery Welfare
9	Nelson	2–1	Fleetwood
22	Bedford Town	0–2	Vauxhall Motors

== 4th qualifying round ==
The teams that entered in this round are: Barnet, Bishop Auckland, Yeovil Town, Bath City, South Liverpool, Gillingham, Guildford City, Chelmsford City, Cheltenham Town, Colchester United, Gainsborough Trinity, Shrewsbury Town, Scarborough, North Shields, Workington, Dulwich Hamlet, Walthamstow Avenue, Wellington Town, Runcorn, Stalybridge Celtic, Marine, Lancaster City, Bromley and Kidderminster Harriers.

=== Ties ===
Tie	Home team	Score	Away team
1	Bishop Auckland	3–2	North Shields
2	Bromsgrove Rovers	5–2	Brush Sports
3	Colchester United	3–1	Chelmsford City
4	Ferryhill Athletic	1–1	Stockton
5	Gillingham	3–1	Barnet
6	Grantham	3–3	Goole Town
7	Grays Athletic	0–1	Banbury Spencer
8	Great Yarmouth Town	3–0	Bury Town
9	Guildford City	5–2	Dulwich Hamlet
10	Horsham	2–1	Redhill
11	Kidderminster Harriers	2–4	Cheltenham Town
12	Lancaster City	5–1	Nelson
13	Marine	3–1	Wigan Athletic
14	Merthyr Tydfil	2–1	Bath City
15	Ryde Sports	0–1	Trowbridge Town
16	Scarborough	2–3	South Shields
17	Scunthorpe & Lindsey United	4–2	Gainsborough Trinity
18	South Liverpool	2–3	Runcorn
19	Street	2–1	Yeovil Town
20	Vauxhall Motors	2–1	Peterborough United
21	Walthamstow Avenue	0–1	Dartford
22	Wealdstone	0–2	Bromley
23	Wellington Town	0–1	Shrewsbury Town
24	Witton Albion	2–3	Stalybridge Celtic
25	Workington	2–1	Netherfield

=== Replays ===
Tie	Home team	Score	Away team
4	Stockton	3–2	Ferryhill Athletic
6	Goole Town	2–3	Grantham

== 1947–48 FA Cup ==
See 1947–48 FA Cup for details of the rounds from the first round proper onwards.
