= Joe Rowley (footballer, born 1899) =

English footballer

Personal information
- Full name: Joseph Rowley
- Date of birth: 13 October 1899
- Place of birth: Wellington, Shropshire, England
- Date of death: 1982 (aged 82–83)
- Position: Wing half

Senior career*
Years	Team	Apps	(Gls)
1918–1919	Talbot Stead Tube Works		
1919–1920	Wellington St George's		
1920–1921	Oakengates Town		
1922–1926	Coventry City	148	(2)
1926–1928	Bristol Rovers	61	(1)
1928	Oakengates Town		
1928–1934	Oswestry Town		
1934	Oakengates Town		
Total		209	(3)
- * Club domestic league appearances and goals

Joseph Rowley (13 October 1899 – 1982) was an English footballer who played in the Football League for Bristol Rovers and Coventry City.
