= Norman Dinsdale =

English footballer

Personal information
- Full name: Norman Dinsdale
- Date of birth: 20 June 1898
- Place of birth: Hunslet, England
- Date of death: 1970 (aged 71–72)
- Height: 5 ft 10 in (1.78 m)

Senior career*
Years	Team	Apps	(Gls)
1917	Kiveton Park		
1919–1920	Anston Athletic		
1920–1928	Notts County	267	(11)
1928–1930	Coventry City	90	(10)
1930–1931	Bristol Rovers	31	(3)
1931–193?	Heanor Town		
- Kidderminster Harriers
- * Club domestic league appearances and goals

Norman Dinsdale (20 June 1898 – 1970) was an English professional footballer who played as a centre half. He made 426 appearances in the Football League playing for Notts County, Coventry City and Bristol Rovers, and also played non-league football for Anston Athletic, Heanor Town and Kidderminster Harriers.
