= Jack Woodman =

English footballer

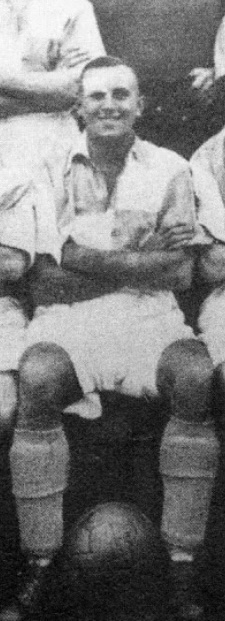
- Woodman, Bristol Rovers, 1936

Personal information
- Full name: John Albert Edward Woodman
- Date of birth: 9 July 1914
- Place of birth: Bristol, England
- Date of death: 16 January 1984 (aged 69)
- Place of death: Bristol, England
- Height: 5 ft 9 in (1.75 m)
- Position: Centre forward

Senior career*
Years	Team	Apps	(Gls)
????–1935	Melrose		
1935–1937	Bristol Rovers	39	(21)
1937–1938	Preston North End	0	(0)
1938–1939	Swindon Town	0	(0)
1939	Wrexham	3	(1)
- * Club domestic league appearances and goals

John Albert Edward Woodman (9 July 1914 – 16 January 1984) was a professional footballer who played in England during the 1930s.

Prior to turning professional, Woodman played for Windmill Hill School in Bristol and Melrose in the Bristol Suburban League. He signed with Bristol Rovers on 23 May 1935 and spent two years playing for them, ending the 1935–36 season as the club's top scorer with fifteen goals.

He commanded a transfer fee of £500, at the time a large sum, when he was signed by Preston North End in 1937. He failed to make a single first team appearance for Preston however, and the following season he was sold to Swindon Town for £350. During his spell in Swindon he again made no appearances for the first team. He signed for Wrexham in 1939, and played in all three of their matches before the 1939–40 Football League season was abandoned due to the outbreak of World War II.
