= Jack Kifford =

Scottish footballer

Personal information
- Full name: John Kifford
- Date of birth: 20 October 1875
- Place of birth: Paisley, Scotland
- Date of death: 1921 (aged 45–46)
- Position: Full back

Senior career*
Years	Team	Apps	(Gls)
1896–1897	Paisley Neilston		
1897–1898	Abercorn	14	(0)
1898–1900	Derby County	6	(0)
1900–1901	Bristol Rovers		
1901–1905	West Bromwich Albion	96	(8)
1905–1906	Millwall Athletic		
1906–1907	Carlisle United		
1907–1908	Coventry City		
Total		116	(8)
- * Club domestic league appearances and goals

John Kifford (20 October 1875 – 1921) was a Scottish footballer who played in the Football League for Derby County and West Bromwich Albion, and in the Scottish Football League for Abercorn.
