= Carl A. Gilbert =

American football coach (1892–1972)

Biographical details
- Born: February 20, 1892; Wilkinsburg, Pennsylvania, U.S.
- Died: June 21, 1972 (aged 80); Meadville, Pennsylvania, U.S.

Playing career
- 1912–1913: Allegheny
- Position: Center

Coaching career (HC unless noted)
- 1918: Allegheny

Head coaching record
- Overall: 2–1

Carl Arlington Gilbert (February 20, 1892 – June 21, 1972) was an American college football coach. Gilbert served as the head football coach at Allegheny College in Meadville, Pennsylvania for one season, in 1918, compiling a record of 2–1.

A native of Scottdale, Pennsylvania, Gilbert played football at Allegheny as a center, captaining the 1913 team.

Gilbert died on June 21, 1972, at the Meadville Hospital.

== Head coaching record ==
Year	Team	Overall	Conference	Standing	Bowl/playoffs
Allegheny Gators (Independent) (1918)
1918	Allegheny	2–1			
Allegheny:		2–1			
Total:		2–1			
