= Bill Routledge =

English footballer

Personal information
- Full name: William H. Routledge
- Date of birth: 28 October 1907
- Place of birth: Haltwhistle, England
- Date of death: 1972
- Height: 6 ft 0 in (1.83 m)
- Position: Defender

Senior career*
| Years | Team | Apps | (Gls) |
| ?–1927 | Stakeford United | | |
| 1927–1928 | South Shields | 0 | (0) |
| 1928–1929 | Crystal Palace | 0 | (0) |
| 1929–1930 | Bangor City | | |
| 1930 | Colwyn Bay United | | |
| 1930–1931 | Chelsea | 0 | (0) |
| 1931–1934 | Bristol Rovers | 64 | (5) |
| 1934–1936 | York City | 78 | (1) |
| 1936–1937 | Carlisle United | 16 | (0) |
| 1939 | St Mirren | | |
- * Club domestic league appearances and goals

William H. Routledge (28 October 1907 – 1972) was an English footballer who played for Bristol Rovers, York City and Carlisle United in the Football League.

== Career ==
Born in Haltwhistle, Northumberland, Routledge was a sprinter before playing football and represented England Schools at international level. He played for Stakeford United before signing for South Shields in August 1927, where he made no league appearances before signing for Crystal Palace in June 1928. After failing to make any league appearances, he moved to Wales to play for Bangor City in September 1929 an Colwyn Bay United in February 1930. He returned to England after signing for Chelsea in May 1930, and after failing to make any league appearances, he signed for Bristol Rovers in May 1931. He made 64 appearances and scored five goals in the league during three seasons for Rovers, before signing for York City in May 1934. He captained the team for two seasons and after making 86 appearances and scoring one goal he moved to Carlisle United in May 1936. He made 16 appearances for them during the 1936–37 season and joined Scottish side St Mirren in February 1939.
