= Richard Gray (footballer) =

English footballer

Personal information
- Date of birth: 1877
- Place of birth: Derby, England
- Position: Goalkeeper

Senior career*
Years	Team	Apps	(Gls)
1895–1898	Burton Swifts	93	(3)
1899–1901	Bristol Rovers	53	(0)
1901–1902	Burton United	50	(0)
Total		196	(3)
- * Club domestic league appearances and goals

Richard Gray (born 1877) was an English professional footballer who played as a goalkeeper in The Football League for Burton Swifts and Burton United, and in the Southern League for Bristol Rovers.

Gray started his career playing for Burton Swifts, for whom he managed to score three goals in his 93 Football League appearances, before moving to Bristol Rovers in 1899. Rovers had just turned professional, and joined the newly created Southern League, and Gray was the first choice 'keeper in his two seasons in the West Country. He played in 53 of Rovers 56 League matches during this spell. In the meantime, his former club had merged with Burton Wanderers to form Burton United, and Gray moved to the new club in 1901, going on to play 50 times for them in the Football League.

== Bibliography ==
- Byrne, Stephen; Jay, Mike (2003). Bristol Rovers Football Club - The Definitive History 1883-2003. Stroud: Tempus. ISBN 0-7524-2717-2.
- Joyce, Michael (2004). Football League Players' Records 1888–1939. Nottingham: SoccerData. ISBN 1-899468-67-6.
