= Ivor Perry =

Welsh footballer

Personal information
- Full name: Ivor Leslie Perry
- Date of birth: 18 July 1904
- Place of birth: Ystrad, Rhondda, Wales
- Date of death: 1965
- Position: Centre half

Senior career*
Years	Team	Apps	(Gls)
- Ystrad Rovers
?–1926	Pontypridd		
1926–1927	Torquay United	55	(2)
1927–1929	Bristol Rovers	35	(1)
1932–?	Walton-on-Thames		
- * Club domestic league appearances and goals

Ivor Leslie Perry (18 July 1904 – 1965) was a Welsh professional footballer who played in The Football League for Bristol Rovers.

Perry started his career with his home town club Ystrad Rovers, and after an unsuccessful trial with Tottenham Hotspur he joined Pontypridd. He joined Torquay United in August 1926, for whom he played a total of 55 games in the Southern League and Western League, scoring once in each league during the 1926–27 season. In the summer of 1927 he joined the only Football League club of his career in Bristol Rovers, where he played 35 times in Football League Division Three South in two years.

After leaving Bristol Rovers he had his second unsuccessful trial with a club, this time at Middlesbrough, and he later played for Walton-on-Thames, where he made his debut in a 7–0 win over Dorking in November 1932.

== Sources ==
- Jay, Mike; Byrne, Stephen (1994). Pirates in Profile: A Who's Who of Bristol Rovers Players. Bristol: Potten, Baber & Murray. p. 198. ISBN 0-9524835-0-5.
- Byrne, Stephen; Jay, Mike (2003). Bristol Rovers Football Club - The Definitive History 1883-2003. Stroud: Tempus. p. 503. ISBN 0-7524-2717-2.
- Joyce, Michael (2004). Football League Players' Records 1888–1939. Nottingham: SoccerData. p. 207. ISBN 1-899468-67-6.
