= Walter Currie (footballer) =

Scottish footballer (1895–1979)

Personal information
- Full name: Walter Robertson Currie
- Date of birth: 2 December 1895
- Place of birth: Auchterderran, Scotland
- Date of death: 1979 (aged 83–84)
- Position: Wing-half

Senior career*
Years	Team	Apps	(Gls)
1913–1914	Denbeath Star		
1914–1916	Cowdenbeath		
1916	East Fife		
1916–1919	Raith Rovers	21	(2)
1919–1922	Leicester City	32	(1)
1922–1923	Bristol Rovers	42	(0)
1923	Clackmannan		
1925–1927	Lochgelly United	13	(0)
Total		108	(3)
- * Club domestic league appearances and goals

Walter Robertson Currie (2 December 1895 – 1979) was a Scottish footballer who played in the Football League for Bristol Rovers and Leicester City.
