= Dwayne Plummer =

English footballer (born 1978)

Personal information
- Date of birth: 12 May 1978 (age 48)
- Place of birth: Bristol, England
- Height: 5 ft 10 in (1.78 m)
- Position: Midfielder

Team information
- Current team: Maldon Town

Youth career
- ????–1995: Bristol City

Senior career*
Years	Team	Apps	(Gls)
1995–1998	Bristol City	14	(0)
1998–2000	Stevenage Borough		
2000	Chesham United		
2000–2002	Bristol Rovers	35	(1)
2003	Harlow Town	1	(0)
2003	Gravesend & Northfleet United	1	(0)
2003	Aylesbury United	7	(1)
2003	Bath City	4	(0)
2003–2004	Crawley Town	3	(0)
2004	Hendon	18	(5)
2004	Thurrock	5	(0)
2004–2005	Kingstonian	1	(0)
2005	Staines Town	8	(2)
2005–2006	AFC Wimbledon	25	(4)
2006–2007	Braintree Town	13	(0)
2007	Boreham Wood	?	(0)
2007	East Thurrock United	3	(2)
2007–2008	Thurrock	18	(2)
2008	Carshalton Athletic	?	(0)
2008–2009	Reno	?	(4)
2009–2010	Arnett Gardens	?	(2)
2010	Maldon Town	11	(3)
- * Club domestic league appearances and goals

Dwayne Plummer (born 12 May 1978) is an English former professional footballer who played as a striker. He has also represented the Cayman Islands in a 5–0 friendly defeat to American club side D.C. United, but he never played for them in a full international after FIFA ruled that he did not meet eligibility requirements.

== Playing career ==
Plummer began his career as a trainee with Bristol City, turning professional in September 1995. He featured in a Paul Gascoigne skills video as a youngster. He joined Stevenage Borough in November 1998 on a free transfer, after initially being on loan.

He then played for Chesham United before joining Bristol Rovers in September 2000. Later that month he scored the winning penalty as Rovers put Premiership Everton out of the League Cup. His time with Rovers was disrupted by injuries, and he left in September 2002 when his contract was terminated for 'gross misconduct' involving an 'incident at a gym'. He had a few months without a club before joining Harlow Town in January 2003. Later that month he joined Gravesend & Northfleet, but was released after just one substitute appearance, a 2–1 defeat at home to Margate.

He joined Aylesbury United, from where he joined Bath City in September 2003, having been with the club since pre-season. He played six times, all as a substitute, before leaving following a disagreement with the Bath fans during the defeat away to Thame United in the FA Cup. Plummer joined Crawley Town in November 2003, but left the following January. He joined Hendon, making his debut against Crawley on 17 January, before joining Thurrock in June 2004.

He joined Kingstonian in December 2004, before joining Staines Town in the 2005 close-season. He was a regular in the Staines side, but left to join AFC Wimbledon in October 2005, having broken his nose in his final game for Staines. He joined Braintree Town in June 2006, but missed the first six games of the season having been sent off while at Wimbledon, a fact he failed to inform the Braintree manager George Borg until the last minute.

Plummer joined Boreham Wood in February 2007, and joined Carshalton Athletic in February 2008.

His younger brother Tristan played for Bristol City.
