= George Reay =

English footballer

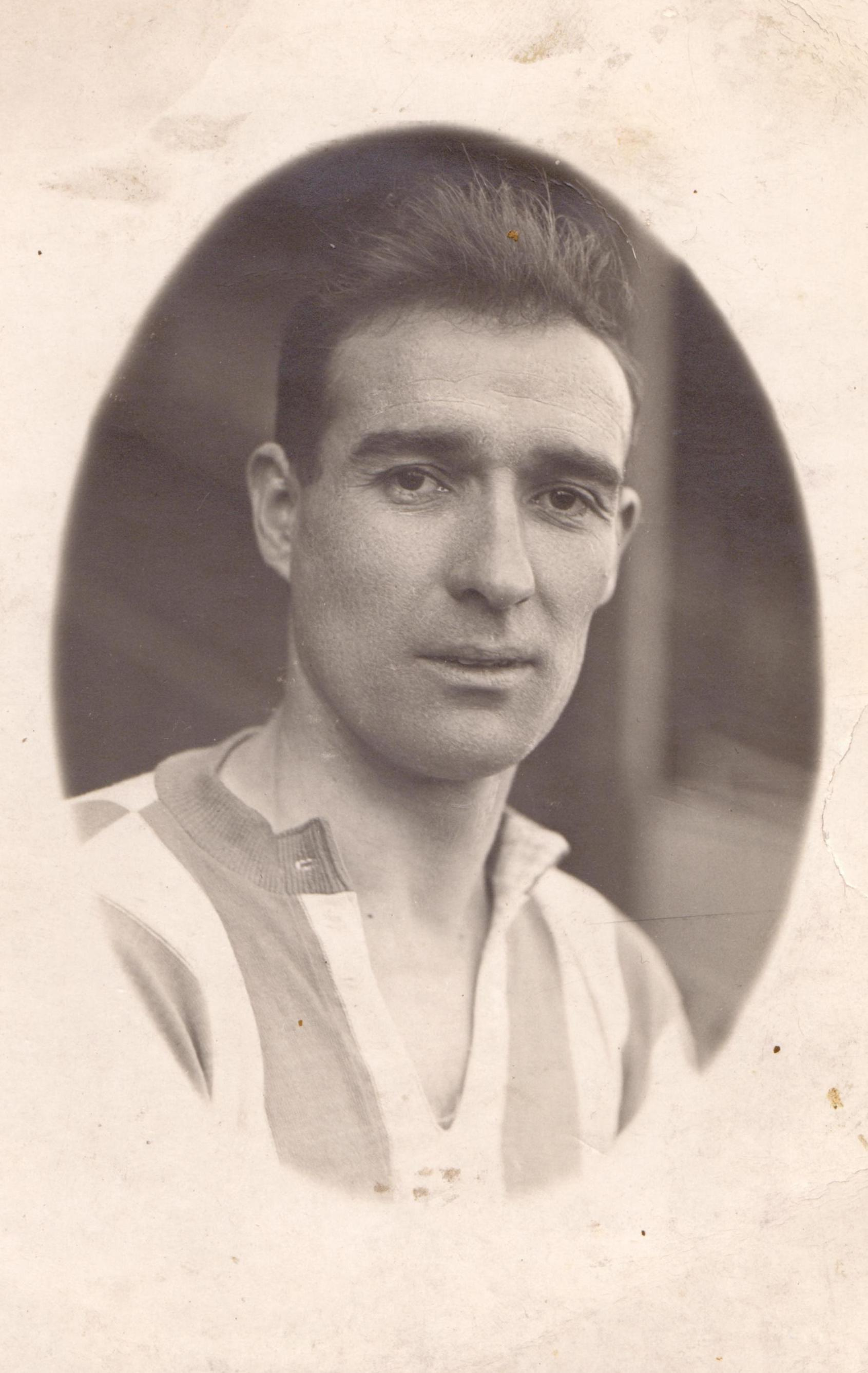

Personal information
- Date of birth: 2 February 1900
- Place of birth: Pit Row, East Howdon, North Tyneside
- Date of death: 29 May 1970 (aged 70)
- Place of death: Rushden, Northamptonshire, England
- Height: 5 ft 11 in (1.80 m)
- Position: Outside right

Senior career*
| Years | Team | Apps | (Gls) |
| 1921–1922 | Percy Main Amateurs | | |
| 1922–1923 | South Shields | 4 | (0) |
| 1923 | Blyth Spartans | | |
| 1923–1924 | Reading | 1 | (0) |
| 1924–1925 | Kettering Town | | |
| 1925–1928 | Raith Rovers | 69 | (17) |
| 1928–1930 | Bristol Rovers | 67 | (9) |
| 1930–1931 | Coventry | 14 | (3) |
| 1931–1934 | Burton Town | | |
- Rushden Town
- Kettering Town
| 1934 | Gresley Town | 1 | (0) |
- * Club domestic league appearances and goals

George Thompson Reay (2 February 1900 – 29 May 1970) was an English professional footballer who played for several British football clubs during the 1920s and 1930s. He was the eldest brother of Ted Reay, who himself played for Sheffield United and Queens Park Rangers, before emigrating to Perth, Australia.

George was born in a miner's row cottage at Howdon, now part of Wallsend on 2 February 1900. He was the fourth child and eldest son of caulker William Reay and his wife Mary Thompson Peel, who had married in 1893. After leaving school, George sought employment at Percy Main Colliery and joined the pit's football team at the end of the First World War. In September 1922, he was scouted and signed for South Shields F.C.. A newspaper article at the time described him as a "22 year-old outside right with a good turn of speed". However, scoring no goals for the club during the 1922–23 season, George was transferred and spent only a short time playing for both Blyth Spartans and Reading F.C.

Following the aforementioned moves in the north east of England, George gained his first notable move when he was bought by Northamptonshire-based club Kettering Town F.C. in the summer of 1924. From here, he was transferred to the Scottish side Raith Rovers after being signed by manager James Henry Logan on 6 December 1925. A letter confirming an appeal by George for his transfer fee to be paid stipulates that the transfer fee was £700.

It was at Raith that George came into his own as an influential outside right. He scored his first goal for Raith on 27 February 1926 in a 2–0 victory over Clydebank, which was witnessed by a crowd of 2,000. George's goal came when he "nodded" the ball into the Clydebank goal after the ball fell in front of him.

Following a transfer to Bristol Rovers in 1928, George made almost seventy appearances for the club and scored at least nine goals for the side. This encouraged James McIntyre, the manager for Coventry City, to sign him in time for the commencement of the 1930-31 season.

At Coventry, George played in reserve, standing in for an injured Percy Richards. He started in eleven Football League Third Division (South) games in this capacity and three FA Cup appearances in the 1930-31 season. His first appearance for the club took place on 11 October 1930 at home to Northampton Town F.C..

In spring 1931, he was released by Coventry's new manager, Harry Storer, and moved to Burton Town.

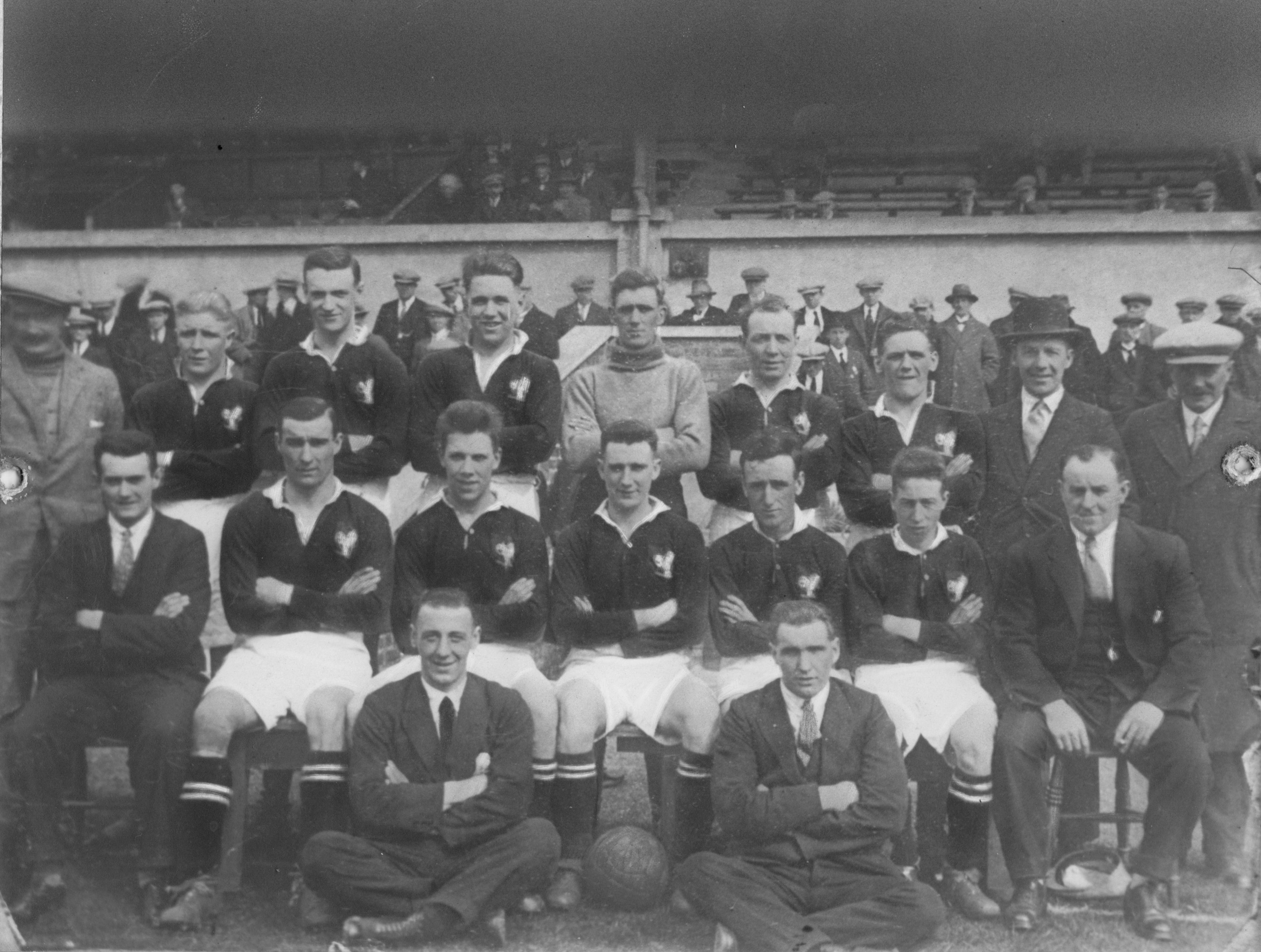
George Reay (middle row, second left) with the Raith Rovers first team in 1927.

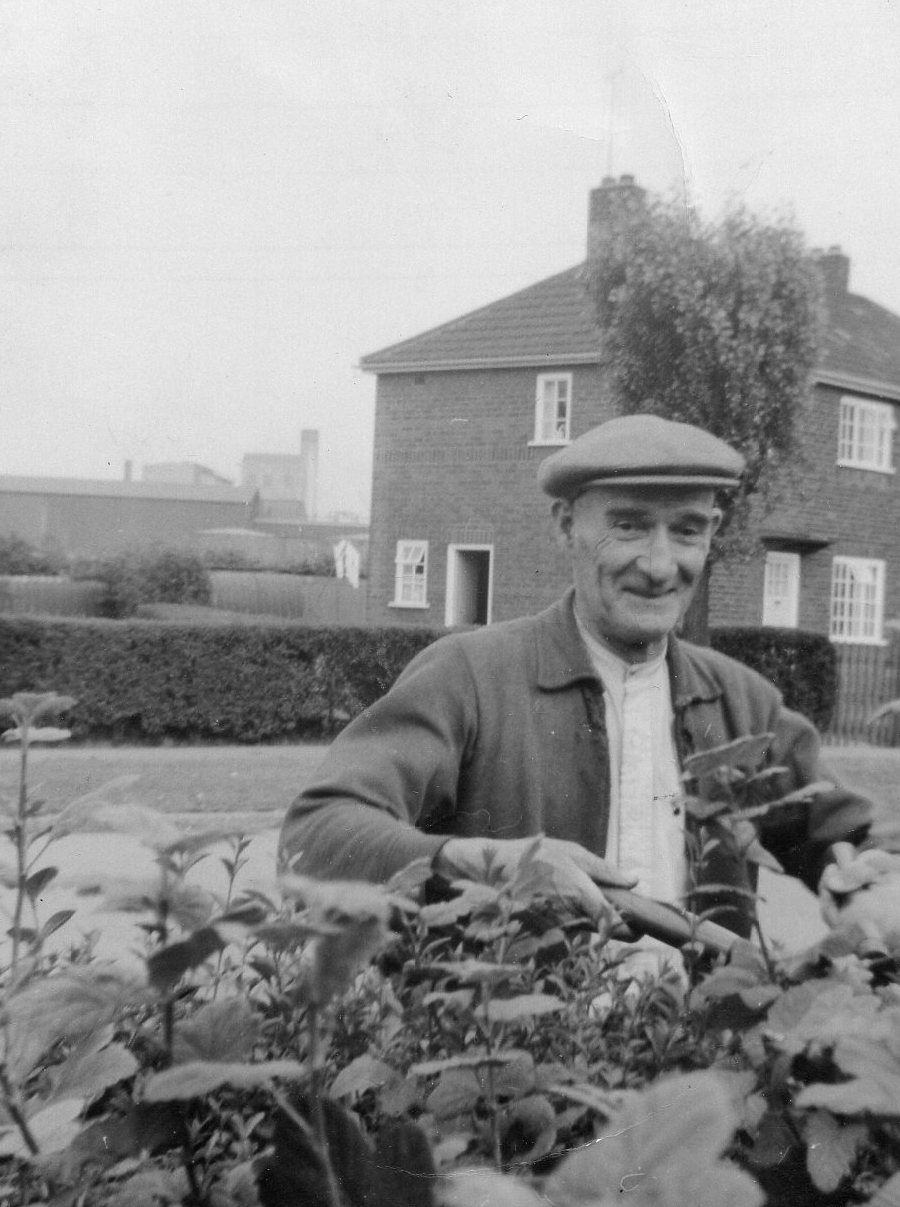
Reay enjoying his retirement outside his Corby home.
