= Martin Higgins =

English footballer

Personal information
- Full name: Martin Higgins
- Date of birth: 1879
- Place of birth: Consett, England
- Position: Wing half

Senior career*
Years	Team	Apps	(Gls)
1903–1904	Bishop Auckland		
1904–1908	Grimsby Town	95	(8)
1908–1909	Bristol Rovers		
1909–1911	New Brompton		
1911–1912	Grimsby Town	1	(0)
1912–191?	Scunthorpe & Lindsey United		
- * Club domestic league appearances and goals

Martin Higgins (born 1879) was an English professional footballer who played as a wing half.
