= Sonny Parker (footballer) =

English footballer

Personal information
- Date of birth: 28 February 1983 (age 43)
- Place of birth: Middlesbrough, England
- Position: Defender

Youth career
- ????–2002: Birmingham City

Senior career*
| Years | Team | Apps | (Gls) |
| 2002–2005 | Bristol Rovers | 30 | (1) |
| 2005 | Gateshead | 17 | (1) |
| 2005–2006 | Bishop Auckland | 12 | (0) |
| 2006 | Horden Colliery Welfare | ? | (?) |
| | Osmotherley Rangers | 14 | (3) |
- * Club domestic league appearances and goals

Sonny Parker (born 28 February 1983) is a former professional footballer who played as a defender in The Football League for Bristol Rovers between 2002 and 2005.

Parker was a youth team player at Birmingham City, and although he progressed to become a regular in their reserves he never made the jump into the first team squad. He joined Bristol Rovers in December 2002 following his release by Birmingham and he went on to make 30 appearances in the Football League Third Division, scoring once, as well as playing twice in the FA Cup and once in the Football League Cup.

He was released by Rovers in the summer of 2005 and returned to his native North East England to join Gateshead. He played seventeen times and scored once in half a season with them, before moving to Bishop Auckland, where he spent the remainder of the 2005–06 campaign. The following season he joined Horden Colliery Welfare, but after the manager left the club late in 2006 he was released. He now works for his family-run business in Teesside and is a time-served joiner.
