= Jack Preece (footballer) =

English footballer

Personal information
- Full name: John Causer Preece
- Date of birth: 30 April 1914
- Place of birth: Wolverhampton, England
- Date of death: 5 July 2003 (aged 89)
- Place of death: Chippenham, England
- Height: 5 ft 10 in (1.78 m)
- Position: Right back

Senior career*
Years	Team	Apps	(Gls)
- Sunbeam Motors
- Wolverhampton Wanderers
- Willenhall Town
- Bristol Rovers
1938–1939	Bradford City	3	(0)
1939–1947	Southport	36	(0)
1947–1948	Swindon Town	7	(0)
- Chippenham United
Total		46+	(0+)
- * Club domestic league appearances and goals

John Causer Preece (30 April 1914 – 5 July 2003) was an English professional footballer who played as a right back.

== Career ==
Born in Wolverhampton, Preece spent his early career with Sunbeam Motors, Wolverhampton Wanderers, Willenhall Town and Bristol Rovers. He joined Bradford City in July 1938, making 3 league appearances for the club, before moving to Southport in May 1939. At Southport he made 36 league appearances between 1939 and 1947. He later played for Swindon Town and Chippenham United. At Swindon he made 7 league appearances between June 1947 and 1948.

== Sources ==
- Frost, Terry (1988). Bradford City A Complete Record 1903-1988. Breedon Books Sport. ISBN 0-907969-38-0.
