= St Philip's Marsh Adult School F.C. =

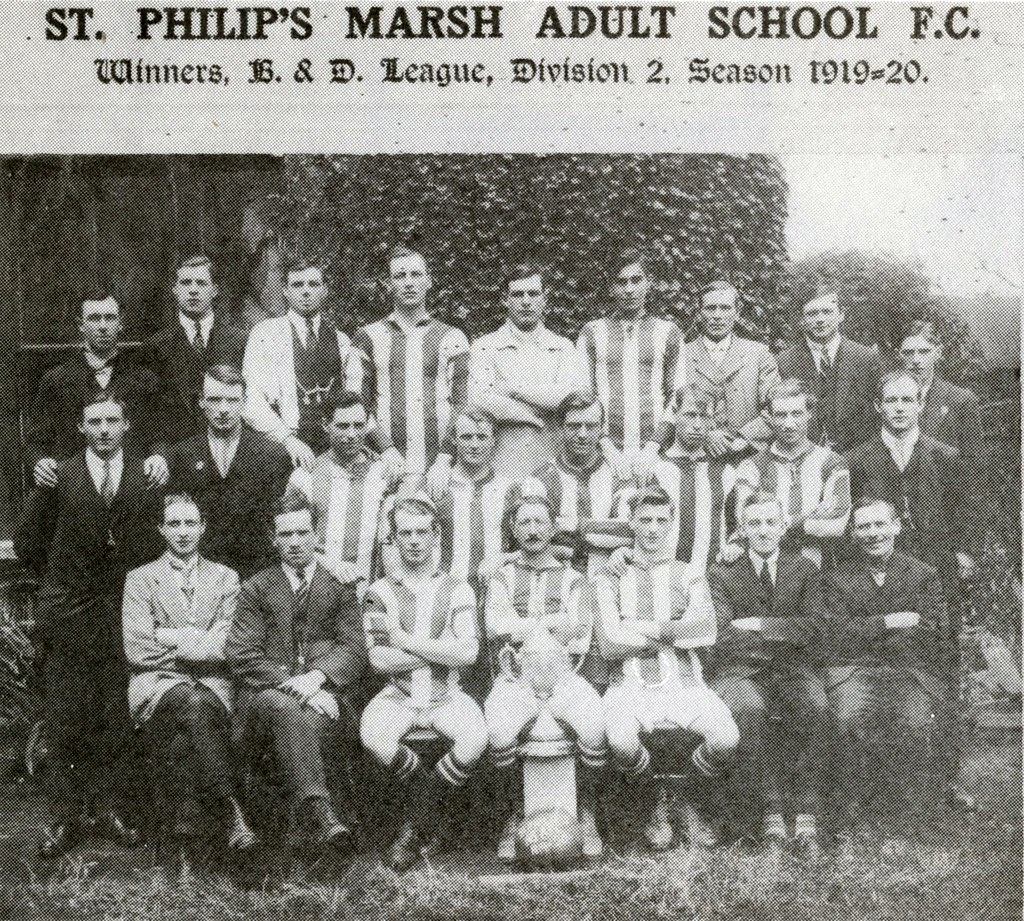
- Full name: St Philip's Marsh Adult School Football Club
- Nickname: Saints
- Founded: 1919
- Ground: Gordon Road
Home colours

St Philip's Marsh Adult School Football Club was an English association football club based in the St Philip's Marsh area of Bristol.

== History ==
The club was founded in 1919 and won Division Two of the Bristol and District Football League in its first season. In the 1920s, Arsenal great Eddie Hapgood started his footballing career with the club.

The club was relegated from the Gloucestershire County League in 1994–95, thanks to a points deduction for not fulfilling a fixture on the scheduled date, and it was forced into the Bristol Premier League.

In 1999, a five-a-side team representing the club reached the semi-final of the Sega Dreamcast Millennium Cup, a competition which started with over 4,000 entrants, but lost to Launching Fiends at Highbury Stadium; Robbie Earle was guest coach for the final stages.

== Colours ==
The club's colours were originally blue and white stripes, and by the 1990s all white.

== Ground ==
The club originally played at Sparke Evans Park, moving to a purpose-built ground at Victoria Terrace in 1921. The club moved again in 1963 when the local electricity board took over the ground for building. The club moved to Norton Lane before finishing at the John Harvey Sports Ground in Gordon Road.

== FA Cup results ==
St Philip's Marsh Adult School played in the FA Cup throughout the 1930s, 40s and 50s. This table shows the progress that the team made through the qualifying rounds of the FA Cup each season that they entered it. A W in a cell indicates that they won that match, a WR that they won after a replay, and a L that they were defeated.

Season	Qualifying rounds					
Season	EP	P	1Q	2Q	3Q	4Q
1932–33	W	W	W	W	L	
1933–34	WR	W	L			
1934–35		W	W	WR	L	
1935–36		W	L			
1936–37		W	L			
1937–38		L				
1938–39		W	L			
World War II
1945–46	Did not participate					
1946–47			W	L		
1947–48		L				
1948–49	Did not participate					
1949–50	L					
1950–51		L				
