= 1996–97 Bristol Rovers F.C. season =

Bristol Rovers
1996–97 season
- Chairman: Geoff Dunford
- Manager: Ian Holloway (player-manager)
- Stadium: Memorial Stadium
- Second Division: 17th
- FA Cup: First round
- League Cup: First round
- Football League Trophy: First round
- Top goalscorer: Beadle (12)
- Average home league attendance: 5,630

During the 1996–97 English football season, Bristol Rovers F.C. competed in the Football League Second Division.

== Season summary ==
In the 1996–97 season, Holloway took over as manager with the club struggling both on and off the pitch. In his first season in charge of Bristol Rovers, he led the club to 17th place in Division Two.

== Final league table ==
Pos	Team	Pld	W	D	L	GF	GA	GD	Pts
15	Preston North End	46	18	7	21	49	55	−6	61
16	Bournemouth	46	15	15	16	43	45	−2	60
17	Bristol Rovers	46	15	11	20	47	50	−3	56
18	Wycombe Wanderers	46	15	10	21	51	57	−6	55
19	Plymouth Argyle	46	12	18	16	47	58	−11	54

Rules for classification: In the Football League goals scored (GF) takes precedence over goal difference (GD).

== Results ==
Bristol Rovers' score comes first

=== Legend ===
Win	Draw	Loss

=== Football League Second Division ===
Date	Opponent	Venue	Result	Attendance	Scorers
17 August 1996	Peterborough United	H	1–0	6,232	Gurney
24 August 1996	Preston North End	A	0–0	9,752	
31 August 1996	Stockport County	H	1–1	6,380	Archer
7 September 1996	Millwall	A	0–2	7,881	
10 September 1996	Bournemouth	H	3–2	4,170	Tillson, Parmenter, Beadle
14 September 1996	Watford	H	0–1	6,276	
17 September 1996	Wrexham	A	0–1	2,401	
21 September 1996	Plymouth Argyle	A	1–0	8,879	Archer
28 September 1996	Chesterfield	H	2–0	5,008	Cureton (2)
1 October 1996	York City	A	2–2	3,714	Cureton, Beadle
4 October 1996	Crewe Alexandra	H	2–0	6,211	Cureton, Gurney
12 October 1996	Notts County	A	1–1	4,558	Beadle
15 October 1996	Rotherham United	A	0–0	2,490	
19 October 1996	Blackpool	H	0–0	5,823	
26 October 1996	Bury	A	1–2	4,082	Miller
29 October 1996	Brentford	H	2–1	5,163	Cureton, Browning
2 November 1996	Gillingham	H	0–0	5,530	
12 November 1996	Shrewsbury Town	A	0–2	2,331	
19 November 1996	Burnley	H	1–2	4,123	Beadle
23 November 1996	Luton Town	A	1–2	5,315	Harris
30 November 1996	Bury	H	4–3	4,496	Beadle (3), Clark
3 December 1996	Walsall	A	0–1	4,084	
15 December 1996	Bristol City	A	1–1	18,674	Beadle
21 December 1996	Wycombe Wanderers	H	3–4	4,465	Cureton, Harris, Lockwood
26 December 1996	Bournemouth	A	0–1	5,036	
11 January 1997	Chesterfield	A	0–1	3,305	
18 January 1997	York City	H	1–1	4,470	Beadle
21 January 1997	Brentford	A	0–0	4,191	
1 February 1997	Shrewsbury Town	H	2–0	4,924	Browning, Beadle
8 February 1997	Gillingham	A	0–1	6,900	
15 February 1997	Luton Town	H	3–2	5,612	Miller, Tillson, Holloway
22 February 1997	Burnley	A	2–2	8,847	Cureton, Alsop
25 February 1997	Plymouth Argyle	H	2–0	6,005	Cureton (2)
1 March 1997	Walsall	H	0–1	5,891	
8 March 1997	Wycombe Wanderers	A	0–2	5,386	
16 March 1997	Bristol City	H	1–2	8,078	Alsop
18 March 1997	Watford	A	0–1	6,139	
23 March 1997	Preston North End	H	1–0	6,405	Cureton
29 March 1997	Peterborough United	A	2–1	6,132	Alsop, Beadle
31 March 1997	Wrexham	H	2–0	6,225	Skinner, Beadle
5 April 1997	Stockport County	A	0–1	5,689	
8 April 1997	Millwall	H	1–0	5,324	Skinner
12 April 1997	Crewe Alexandra	A	0–1	4,281	
20 April 1997	Notts County	H	1–0	6,309	Bennett
26 April 1997	Blackpool	A	2–3	6,673	Cureton, Parmenter
3 May 1997	Rotherham United	H	1–2	5,950	Monington (own goal)

=== FA Cup ===
Round	Date	Opponent	Venue	Result	Attendance	Goalscorers
R1	16 November 1996	Exeter City	H	1–2	5,841	Parmenter

=== League Cup ===
Round	Date	Opponent	Venue	Result	Attendance	Goalscorers
R1 1st Leg	20 August 1996	Luton Town	A	0–3	2,643	
R1 2nd Leg	4 September 1996	Luton Town	H	2–1 (lost 2–4 on agg)	2,320	Gurney, Archer

=== Football League Trophy ===
Round	Date	Opponent	Venue	Result	Attendance	Goalscorers
SR1	10 December 1996	Brentford	H	1–2	2,752	

== Squad ==
Note: Flags indicate national team as defined under FIFA eligibility rules; some limited exceptions apply. Players may hold more than one non-FIFA nationality.

No.	Pos.	Nation	Player
—	GK	(England) ENG	Andy Collett
—	GK	(England) ENG	Shane Higgs
—	DF	(England) ENG	Jamie Clapham (on loan from Tottenham Hotspur)
—	DF	(England) ENG	Billy Clark
—	DF	(England) ENG	Brian Gayle
—	DF	(England) ENG	Andy Gurney
—	DF	(England) ENG	Matt Lockwood
—	DF	(England) ENG	Lee Martin
—	DF	(England) ENG	Graeme Power
—	DF	(Wales) WAL	David Pritchard
—	DF	(England) ENG	Andy Tillson
—	DF	(England) ENG	Tom White
—	MF	(England) ENG	Lee Archer
—	MF	(England) ENG	Steve Bowey
—	MF	(Wales) WAL	Marcus Browning

No.	Pos.	Nation	Player
—	MF	(England) ENG	Jon French
—	MF	(England) ENG	Matt Hayfield
—	MF	(England) ENG	Ian Holloway (player-manager)
—	MF	(Wales) WAL	Josh Low
—	MF	(England) ENG	Paul Miller
—	MF	(England) ENG	Ryan Morgan
—	MF	(Wales) WAL	Tom Ramasut
—	MF	(England) ENG	Justin Skinner
—	MF	(England) ENG	Lee Zabek
—	FW	(England) ENG	Julian Alsop
—	FW	(England) ENG	Peter Beadle
—	FW	(England) ENG	Frankie Bennett
—	FW	(England) ENG	Jamie Cureton
—	FW	(England) ENG	Jason Harris (on loan from Crystal Palace)
—	FW	(England) ENG	Steve Parmenter
