= 1997–98 Bristol Rovers F.C. season =

Bristol Rovers
1997–98 season
- Chairman: Denis Dunford
- Manager: Ian Holloway (player-manager)
- Stadium: Memorial Stadium
- Second Division: 5th
- FA Cup: Third round
- League Cup: First round
- Auto Windscreens Shield: Quarter finals
- Top goalscorer: League: Hayles (23); All: Hayles (26)
- Average home league attendance: 6,413

During the 1997–98 English football season, Bristol Rovers F.C. competed in the Football League Second Division.

== Season summary ==
The 1997–98 season saw Bristol Rovers reach the playoff places, finishing in 5th place and despite taking a first-leg advantage of 3–1 against Northampton Town, Rovers subsequently lost 3–0 in the second leg and went out 4–3 on aggregate in the semi-finals.

== Final league table ==
Pos	Team	Pld	W	D	L	GF	GA	GD	Pts	Promotion or relegation
3	Grimsby Town (O, P)	46	19	15	12	55	37	+18	72	Qualification for the Second Division play-offs
4	Northampton Town	46	18	17	11	52	37	+15	71	Qualification for the Second Division play-offs
5	Bristol Rovers	46	20	10	16	70	64	+6	70	Qualification for the Second Division play-offs
6	Fulham	46	20	10	16	60	43	+17	70	Qualification for the Second Division play-offs
7	Wrexham	46	18	16	12	55	51	+4	70	

Rules for classification: In the Football League goals scored (GF) takes precedence over goal difference (GD).
(O) Play-off winners; (P) Promoted

== Results ==
Bristol Rovers' score comes first

=== Legend ===
Win	Draw	Loss

=== Football League Second Division ===
Date	Opponent	Venue	Result	Attendance	Scorers
9 August 1997	Plymouth Argyle	H	1–1	7,386	Hayles
16 August 1997	York City	A	1–0	3,307	Hayles
23 August 1997	Carlisle United	H	3–1	6,044	Bennett, Hayles, Penrice
30 August 1997	Burnley	A	0–0	9,887	
2 September 1997	Bournemouth	A	1–1	5,550	Cureton (pen)
9 September 1997	Walsall	H	2–0	6,225	Ramasut, Hayles
13 September 1997	Gillingham	H	1–2	6,572	Hayles
20 September 1997	Chesterfield	A	0–0	5,309	
27 September 1997	Oldham Athletic	A	4–4	5,990	Beadle (2), Hayles, Cureton (pen)
4 October 1997	Wrexham	H	1–0	6,829	Ramasut
14 October 1997	Watford	H	1–2	8,110	Penrice
18 October 1997	Wycombe Wanderers	A	0–1	5,836	
21 October 1997	Brentford	A	3–2	3,967	Hayles (2), Beadle
25 October 1997	Blackpool	H	0–3	6,183	
1 November 1997	Northampton Town	A	1–1	7,264	Cureton
4 November 1997	Bristol City	H	1–2	7,552	Tillson
8 November 1997	Fulham	H	2–3	6,166	Penrice (2)
18 November 1997	Preston North End	A	2–1	7,798	Penrice, Alsop
22 November 1997	Southend United	A	1–1	3,653	Beadle (pen)
29 November 1997	Millwall	H	2–1	5,542	Beadle, Hayles
2 December 1997	Wigan Athletic	A	0–3	2,738	
12 December 1997	Grimsby Town	H	0–4	4,801	
20 December 1997	Luton Town	A	4–2	5,266	Cureton, Hayles (2), Beadle
26 December 1997	Walsall	A	1–0	6,634	Beadle
28 December 1997	Bournemouth	H	5–3	7,256	Beadle (3), Hayles (2)
10 January 1998	Plymouth Argyle	A	2–1	6,850	Cureton, Hayles
17 January 1998	Burnley	H	1–0	7,208	Cureton
24 January 1998	Carlisle United	A	1–3	5,725	Cureton
31 January 1998	Gillingham	A	1–1	5,593	Cureton (pen)
7 February 1998	Chesterfield	H	3–1	5,481	Bennett, Cureton (2)
14 February 1998	Wrexham	A	0–1	3,716	
21 February 1998	Oldham Athletic	H	3–1	5,789	Hayles (2), Ramasut
24 February 1998	Wycombe Wanderers	H	3–1	5,805	Hayles, Beadle, Ramasut
28 February 1998	Watford	A	2–3	12,186	White, Cureton
3 March 1998	Fulham	A	0–1	6,843	
7 March 1998	Northampton Town	H	0–2	6,535	
10 March 1998	York City	H	1–2	4,289	Ramasut
14 March 1998	Bristol City	A	0–2	17,086	
21 March 1998	Preston North End	H	2–2	5,278	Cureton (pen), Hayles
27 March 1998	Southend United	H	2–0	5,323	Tillson, Hayles
4 April 1998	Millwall	A	1–1	5,635	Zabek
10 April 1998	Wigan Athletic	H	5–0	6,038	Hayles, Ramasut, Beadle (3)
13 April 1998	Grimsby Town	A	2–1	5,484	Hayles (2)
18 April 1998	Luton Town	H	2–1	8,038	Beadle, Tillson
25 April 1998	Blackpool	A	0–1	7,057	
2 May 1998	Brentford	H	2–1	9,043	Cureton, Hayles

=== Second Division play-offs ===
Round	Date	Opponent	Venue	Result	Attendance	Goalscorers
SF 1st Leg	10 May 1998	Northampton Town	H	3–1	9,173	Beadle (pen), Bennett, Hayles
SF 2nd Leg	13 May 1998	Northampton Town	A	0–3 (lost 3–4 on agg)	7,501	

=== FA Cup ===
Round	Date	Opponent	Venue	Result	Attendance	Goalscorers
R1	14 November 1997	Gillingham	H	2–2	4,825	Alsop, Holloway
R1R	25 November 1997	Gillingham	A	2–0	4,459	Hayles, Penrice
R2	6 December 1997	Wisbech Town	A	2–0	3,593	Beadle, Hayles
R3	3 January 1998	Ipswich Town	H	1–1	8,610	Beadle
R3R	13 January 1998	Ipswich Town	A	0–1	11,362	

=== League Cup ===
Round	Date	Opponent	Venue	Result	Attendance	Goalscorers
R1 1st Leg	12 August 1997	Bristol City	A	0–0	9,341	
R1 2nd Leg	26 August 1997	Bristol City	H	1–2 (lost 1–2 on agg)	5,872	Alsop

=== Football League Trophy ===
Round	Date	Opponent	Venue	Result	Attendance	Goalscorers
SR1	8 December 1997	Cambridge United	H	1–0	2,386	Cureton
SR2	6 January 1998	Exeter City	A	2–1	1,851	Bennett, Tillson
SQF	28 January 1998	Walsall	H	0–1 (a.e.t.)	4,165	

== Squad ==
Note: Flags indicate national team as defined under FIFA eligibility rules; some limited exceptions apply. Players may hold more than one non-FIFA nationality.

No.	Pos.	Nation	Player
-	GK	(England) ENG	Andy Collett
-	GK	(England) ENG	Shane Higgs
-	GK	(Wales) WAL	Lee Jones (on loan from Swansea City)
-	DF	(England) ENG	Steve Foster
-	DF	(England) ENG	David Pritchard
-	DF	(England) ENG	Andy Tillson
-	DF	(Wales) WAL	Jason Perry
-	DF	(England) ENG	Matt Lockwood
-	DF	(England) ENG	Tom White
-	DF	(England) ENG	Brian Gayle
-	DF	(England) ENG	Graeme Power
-	DF	(England) ENG	Luke Basford
-	DF	(England) ENG	Mark Smith
-	DF	(England) ENG	Billy Clark
-	DF	(England) ENG	Lee Martin

No.	Pos.	Nation	Player
-	MF	(England) ENG	Gary Penrice
-	MF	(England) ENG	Ian Holloway (player-manager)
-	MF	(Wales) WAL	Tom Ramasut
-	MF	(England) ENG	Matt Hayfield
-	MF	(England) ENG	Lee Zabek
-	MF	(England) ENG	Josh Low
-	MF	(England) ENG	Jon French
-	MF	(England) ENG	Lee Archer
-	FW	(Jamaica) JAM	Barry Hayles
-	FW	(England) ENG	Jamie Cureton
-	FW	(England) ENG	Peter Beadle
-	FW	(England) ENG	Julian Alsop
-	FW	(England) ENG	Frankie Bennett
-	FW	(England) ENG	Steve Parmenter
-	FW	(England) ENG	David Whyte

== Transfers ==
=== In ===
Date	Pos.	Name	From	Fee
1 August 1997	DF	(Wales) Jason Perry	(Wales) Cardiff City	Free transfer
1 August 1997	DF	(England) Steve Foster	(England) Woking	£150,000
1 August 1997	MF	(England) Gary Penrice	(England) Watford	Free transfer
1 August 1997	FW	(Jamaica) Barry Hayles	(England) Stevenage	£250,000

=== Out ===
Date	Pos.	Name	To	Fee
1 August 1997	MF	(England) Paul Miller	(England) Lincoln City	Free transfer
1 August 1997	DF	(England) Andy Gurney	(England) Torquay United	Free transfer
31 October 1997	DF	(England) Billy Clark	(England) Exeter City	Free transfer
1 December 1997	MF	(England) Ryan Morgan	(England) Clevedon Town	Free transfer
8 December 1997	MF	(England) Brian Gayle	(England) Shrewsbury Town	Monthly
13 March 1998	FW	(England) Julian Alsop	(Wales) Swansea City	£30,000
13 March 1998	FW	(England) Steve Parmenter	(England) Yeovil Town	Free transfer
14 March 1998	FW	(England) David Whyte	(England) Southend United	Signed

Transfers in: ▼£400,000
Transfers out: ▲£30,000
Total spending: ▼£370,000
