= 1999–2000 Bristol Rovers F.C. season =

Bristol Rovers
1999–2000 season
- Manager: Ian Holloway
- Second Division: 7th
- FA Cup: First round
- League Cup: Second round
- Football League Trophy: Area quarter-final
- Top goalscorer: Jamie Cureton and Jason Roberts (22)

During the 1999–2000 English football season, Bristol Rovers competed in the Football League Second Division.

== Season summary ==
Bristol Rovers nearly reached the play-offs, finishing seventh that season despite never dropping out of the playoffs all season until the last day of the season with a defeat at Cardiff City.

== Final league table ==
Pos	Team	Pld	W	D	L	GF	GA	GD	Pts	Promotion or relegation
5	Millwall	46	23	13	10	76	50	+26	82	Qualification for the Second Division play-offs
6	Stoke City	46	23	13	10	68	42	+26	82	Qualification for the Second Division play-offs
7	Bristol Rovers	46	23	11	12	69	45	+24	80	
8	Notts County	46	18	11	17	61	55	+6	65	
9	Bristol City	46	15	19	12	59	57	+2	64	

Rules for classification: 1) Points; 2) Goal difference; 3) Goals scored

== First-team squad ==
Squad at end of season

Note: Flags indicate national team as defined under FIFA eligibility rules; some limited exceptions apply. Players may hold more than one non-FIFA nationality.

No.	Pos.	Nation	Player
1	GK	(Wales) WAL	Lee Jones
2	DF	(England) ENG	Dave Pritchard
3	DF	(England) ENG	Trevor Challis
4	DF	(England) ENG	Steve Foster
5	DF	(England) ENG	Andy Thomson
6	DF	(England) ENG	Andy Tillson
7	MF	(England) ENG	Ronnie Mauge
8	MF	(England) ENG	David Hillier
9	MF	(Wales) WAL	Michael Meaker
10	FW	(England) ENG	Jamie Cureton
11	FW	(Grenada) GRN	Jason Roberts
12	DF	(England) ENG	Robbie Pethick
14	DF	(England) ENG	Mark Smith
15	MF	(Latvia) LVA	Vitālijs Astafjevs
16	DF	(England) ENG	Mike Trought
17	DF	(France) FRA	Stéphane Léoni
18	FW	(England) ENG	Nathan Ellington

No.	Pos.	Nation	Player
20	GK	(Netherlands) NED	Michel Kuipers
21	MF	(England) ENG	Jamie Shore
22	MF	(England) ENG	Lee Zabek
23	DF	(England) ENG	Tom White
24	FW	(England) ENG	Bobby Zamora
25	GK	(England) ENG	Ray Johnston
26	DF	(England) ENG	Robert Trees
27	MF	(England) ENG	Ian Holloway
28	FW	(England) ENG	Gary Penrice
29	GK	(England) ENG	Brian Parkin
30	MF	(England) ENG	Mark Walters
31	MF	(England) ENG	Simon Bryant
32	FW	(Trinidad and Tobago) TRI	Nigel Pierre
34	MF	(England) ENG	Lewis Hogg
35	MF	(England) ENG	Jordan Stewart (on loan from Leicester City)
36	DF	(Sweden) SWE	Marcus Andreasson
37	MF	(England) ENG	Robert Wolleaston (on loan from Chelsea)

=== Left club during season ===
Note: Flags indicate national team as defined under FIFA eligibility rules; some limited exceptions apply. Players may hold more than one non-FIFA nationality.

No.	Pos.	Nation	Player
19	FW	(England) ENG	Frankie Bennett (to Forest Green Rovers)
29	GK	(England) ENG	Stuart Taylor (on loan from Arsenal)

No.	Pos.	Nation	Player
32	DF	(England) ENG	Shaun Byrne (on loan from West Ham United)
33	GK	(England) ENG	Rhys Evans (on loan from Chelsea)
