= 2003–04 Plymouth Argyle F.C. season =

English football club season

Plymouth Argyle
2003–04 season
- Manager: Paul Sturrock August–March; Kevin Summerfield (caretaker) March–April; Bobby Williamson April onwards
- Stadium: Home Park
- Second Division: 1st (promoted)
- FA Cup: First round
- League Cup: First round
- Football League Trophy: Second round (South)
- Top goalscorer: David Friio (14 goals)
- Highest home attendance: Queens Park Rangers (19,888); Away: Sheffield Wednesday (20,090)
- Lowest home attendance: Wycombe Wanderers (4,298); Away: Colchester United (2,367)
- Biggest win: 7–0 Chesterfield (home)
- Biggest defeat: 3–0 Queens Park Rangers (away); 3–0 Tranmere Rovers (away); 4–1 Oldham Athletic (away)

The 2003/04 football season saw Plymouth Argyle regain a place in the second tier of English football for the first time in twelve seasons, Along the way to capturing the Division Two championship they accumulated 90 league points, 21 clean sheets and a club record of seven straight clean sheets whilst also losing arguably the most successful manager in recent history in Paul Sturrock to Southampton F.C.

== Players ==
=== First-team squad ===
Squad at end of season

Note: Flags indicate national team as defined under FIFA eligibility rules; some limited exceptions apply. Players may hold more than one non-FIFA nationality.

No.	Pos.	Nation	Player
1	GK	FRA	Romain Larrieu
2	DF	IRL	David Worrell
3	MF	ENG	Lee Hodges
4	MF	FRA	David Friio
5	DF	IRL	Graham Coughlan
6	MF	ENG	Steve Adams
7	MF	ENG	David Norris
8	MF	CAN	Jason Bent
9	FW	IRL	Mickey Evans (Note: Evans was born in Plymouth, England, but also qualified to represent the Republic of Ireland internationally and made his international debut for the Republic of Ireland in October 1997.)
10	FW	ENG	Ian Stonebridge
11	MF	ENG	Martin Phillips
14	DF	NIR	Tony Capaldi (Note: Capaldi was born in Porsgrunn, Norway, but also qualified to represent Scotland and Northern Ireland internationally through his father and grandmother respectively and represented Northern Ireland at U-18 and U-21 level before making his international debut for Northern Ireland in March 2004.)
15	DF	ENG	Paul Wotton (captain)
16	DF	ENG	Hasney Aljofree

No.	Pos.	Nation	Player
18	FW	ENG	Nathan Lowndes
19	MF	SCO	Marino Keith
21	FW	SCO	Blair Sturrock
22	DF	ENG	Paul Connolly
23	GK	ENG	Luke McCormick
24	DF	WAL	Peter Gilbert (Note: Gilbert was born in Newcastle upon Tyne, England, but also qualified to represent Wales internationally and represented Wales at U-21 level.)
25	DF	ENG	Matt Villis
26	MF	ENG	Andrew Watkins
27	FW	ENG	Ryan Trudgian
28	DF	IRL	Wayne O'Sullivan (Note: O'Sullivan was born in Akrotiri, Cyprus, but also qualified to represent the Republic of Ireland internationally and represented the Republic of Ireland at U-21 level.)
29	MF	ENG	Marcus Martin
32	FW	ENG	Stewart Yetton
34	DF	ENG	Ryan Dickson

=== Left club during season ===
Note: Flags indicate national team as defined under FIFA eligibility rules; some limited exceptions apply. Players may hold more than one non-FIFA nationality.

No.	Pos.	Nation	Player
17	DF	NIR	Brian McGlinchey (to Torquay United)
20	MF	ENG	David Beresford (to Tranmere Rovers)

No.	Pos.	Nation	Player
20	DF	COD	Eugène Kangulungu (released)
31	GK	FIN	Jani Viander (to Brentford)

== Pre-season ==
=== Matches ===
15 July 2003	St Blazey	0–1	Plymouth Argyle	Blaise Park, Cornwall
			Evans

17 July 2003	Tiverton	1–3	Plymouth Argyle	Ladysmead, Devon
			Keith; Wotton

23 July 2003	SV Wacker Burghausen	1–0	Plymouth Argyle

26 July 2003	SC Schwanenstadt	0–0	Plymouth Argyle
		45 Minute Match

26 July 2003	FC Astra Giurgiu	1–0	Plymouth Argyle
		45 Minute Match

28 July 2003	SV Bad Ischl	1–1	Plymouth Argyle
			Beresford

30 July 2003	Plymouth Argyle	2–2	Charlton Athletic	Home Park
	Friio; Wotton

2 August 2003	Plymouth Argyle	0–0	West Bromwich Albion	Home Park

4 August 2003	Saltash United	0–5	Plymouth Argyle	Kimberley Stadium, Saltash
			Lowndes; Coughlan; Beresford

Last updated: 5 November 2014
Source:Greens on Screen

== Football League Second Division ==
=== League table ===
Pos	Team	Pld	W	D	L	GF	GA	GD	Pts	Promotion or relegation
1	Plymouth Argyle (C, P)	46	26	12	8	85	41	+44	90	Promotion to Football League Championship
2	Queens Park Rangers (P)	46	22	17	7	80	45	+35	83	Promotion to Football League Championship
3	Bristol City	46	23	13	10	58	37	+21	82	Qualification for the Second Division play-offs
4	Brighton & Hove Albion (O, P)	46	22	11	13	64	43	+21	77	Qualification for the Second Division play-offs
5	Swindon Town	46	20	13	13	76	58	+18	73	Qualification for the Second Division play-offs

Rules for classification: In the Football League goals scored (GF) takes precedence over goal difference (GD).
(C) Champions; (O) Play-off winners; (P) Promoted

=== Matches ===
9 August 2003 1	Plymouth Argyle	2–2	Grimsby Town	Home Park, Plymouth
15:00	Keith 32'; Coughlan 51'		Boulding 28'; Anderson 64'	Attendance: 9,590; Referee: L Cable

16 August 2003 2	Rushden and Diamonds	2–1	Plymouth Argyle	Nene Park, Irthlingborough
15:00	Lowe 54'; Jack 56'		Capaldi 77'	Attendance: 4,045; Referee: B Knight

23 August 2003 3	Plymouth Argyle	3–1	Stockport County	Home Park, Plymouth
15:00	Keith 21'; Hodges 23'; Bent 28'		Beckett 43'	Attendance: 7,594; Referee: Eddie Ilderton

25 August 2003 4	Chesterfield	1–1	Plymouth Argyle	Saltergate, Chesterfield
19:45	Brandon 50'		Friio 66'	Attendance: 4,089; Referee: Mark Clattenburg

30 August 2003 5	Plymouth Argyle	3–3	Brighton	Home Park, Plymouth
15:00	Coughlan 19'; Stonebridge 81'; Friio 89'		Connolly 14' (o.g.); Butters 36'; Knight 73'	Attendance: 9,289; Referee: M Fletcher

6 September 2003 6	Brentford	1–3	Plymouth Argyle	Griffin Park, London
15:00	May 27'		Stonebridge 9'; Evans 58', 84'	Attendance: 5,688; Referee: Steve Tomlin

12 September 2003 7	Plymouth Argyle	2–1	Luton Town	Home Park, Plymouth
15:00	Evans 82'; Friio 90'		McSheffrey 58'	Attendance: 9,894; Referee: Anthony Bates

16 September 2003 8	Peterborough United	2–2	Plymouth Argyle	London Road, Peterborough
19:45	Arber 27' (pen.); Clarke 81'		Wotton 10' (pen.); Capaldi 84'	Attendance: 4,183; Referee: R Pearson

20 September 2003 9	Wrexham	2–2	Plymouth Argyle	Racecourse Ground, Wrexham
15:00	Lawrence 28'; Jones 42' (pen.)		Norris 31'; Capaldi 49'	Attendance: 3,945; Referee: Michael Ryan

27 September 2003 10	Plymouth Argyle	2–0	Barnsley	Home Park, Plymouth
15:00	Coughlan 38'; Evans 75'			Attendance: 8,695; Referee: Richard Beeby

27 September 2003 11	Plymouth Argyle	0–1	Bristol City	Home Park, Plymouth
15:00			Peacock 27'	Attendance: 13,923; Referee: P Armstrong

4 October 2003 12	Wycombe Wanderers	0–0	Plymouth Argyle	Adams Park, High Wycombe
15:00				Attendance: 5,708; Referee: Mike Thorpe

11 October 2003 13	Plymouth Argyle	6–0	Tranmere	Home Park, Plymouth
15:00	Friio 7'; Wotton 38'; Gilbert 45'; Keith 49'; Evans 56'; Norris 79'			Attendance: 7,610; Referee: Andre Marriner

18 October 2003 14	Port Vale	1–5	Plymouth Argyle	Vale Park, Stoke-on-Trent
15:00	McPhee 51'		Keith 35'; Friio 38', 72'; Adams 45'; Wotton 46'	Attendance: 5,786; Referee: Lee Probert

22 October 2003 15	Sheffield Wednesday	1–3	Plymouth Argyle	Hillsborough Stadium, Sheffield
19:45	Reddy 84'		Friio 22', 64'; Wotton 46' (pen.)	Attendance: 20,090; Referee: G Laws

25 October 2003 16	Plymouth Argyle	1–0	Blackpool	Home Park, Plymouth
15:00	Keith 42'			Attendance: 12,372; Referee: Steve Tanner

1 November 2003 17	Plymouth Argyle	2–2	Oldham	Home Park, Plymouth
15:00	Wotton 17'; Evans 50'		Beharall 10', 63'	Attendance: 11,205; Referee: M Warren

15 November 2003 18	Queens Park Rangers	3–0	Plymouth Argyle	Loftus Road, London
15:00	Gallen 35', 75'; Thorpe 72'			Attendance: 17,049; Referee: Trevor Parkes

22 November 2003 19	Plymouth Argyle	2–0	Hartlepool United	Home Park, Plymouth
15:00	Keith 45'; Lowndes 48'			Attendance: 9,000; Referee: Iain Williamson

29 November 2003 20	Colchester United	0–2	Plymouth Argyle	Layer Road, Colchester
15:00			Capaldi 4'; Keith 11'	Attendance: 4,332; Referee: Kevin Wright

13 December 2003 21	Swindon Town	2–3	Plymouth Argyle	County Ground (Swindon), Swindon
15:00	Fallon 80'; Parkin 90'		Capaldi 13'; Norris 76'; Keith 90'	Attendance: 9,374; Referee: B Curson

20 December 2003 22	Plymouth Argyle	3–0	Notts County	Home Park, Plymouth
15:00	Lowndes 28'; Evans 79', 82'			Attendance: 9,923; Referee: R Olivier

26 December 2003 23	AFC Bournemouth	0–2	Plymouth Argyle	Dean Court, Bournemouth
15:00			Wotton 22'; Norris 40'	Attendance: 8,901; Referee: Richard Beeby

28 December 2003 24	Plymouth Argyle	2–0	Brentford	Home Park, Plymouth
15:00	Capaldi 48'; Lowndes 63'			Attendance: 17,882; Referee: P Prosser

3 January 2004 25	Plymouth Argyle	7–0	Chesterfield	Home Park, Plymouth
15:00	Hodges 4'; Capaldi 11'; Lowndes 12', 18'; Friio 15', 36', 88'			Attendance: 13,109; Referee: Keith Hill

10 January 2004 26	Grimsby Town	0–0	Plymouth Argyle	Blundell Park, Grimsby
15:00				Attendance: 5,007; Referee: Eddie Evans

17 January 2003 27	Plymouth Argyle	3–0	Rushden and Diamonds	Home Park, Plymouth
15:00	Coughlan 47'; Stonebridge 58'; Wotton 90'			Attendance: 13,021; Referee: Clive Penton

24 January 2004 28	Stockport County	0–2	Plymouth Argyle	Edgeley Park, Stockport
15:00			Friio 29'; Coughlan 62'	Attendance: 6,608; Referee: Paul Robindon

31 January 2004 29	Brighton	2–1	Plymouth Argyle	Withdean Stadium, Brighton
15:00	Benjamin 12'; Knight 34'		Lowndes 88'	Attendance: 6,379; Referee: Phil Joslin

7 February 2004 30	Plymouth Argyle	0–0	AFC Bournemouth	Home Park, Plymouth
15:00				Attendance: 13,371; Referee: B Knight

17 February 2004 31	Tranmere Rovers	3–0	Plymouth Argyle	Prenton Park, Tranmere
19:45	Dadi 19', 52'; Hume 23'			Attendance: 7,948; Referee: M Cowburn

21 February 2004 32	Plymouth Argyle	2–1	Port Vale	Home Park, Plymouth
15:00	Phillips 80'; Stonebridge 90'		McPhee 53'	Attendance: 13,371; Referee: B Knight

28 February 2004 33	Blackpool	0–1	Plymouth Argyle	Bloomfield Road, Blackpool
15:00			Stonebridge 54'	Attendance: 7,253; Referee: Scott Mathieson

2 March 2004 34	Plymouth Argyle	2–0	Sheffield Wednesday	Hillsborough Stadium, Sheffield
19:45	Evans 7'; Coughlan 77'			Attendance: 17,218; Referee: Andy Penn

6 March 2004 35	Notts County	0–0	Plymouth Argyle	Meadow Lane, Nottingham
15:00				Attendance: 8,057; Referee: Nigel Miller

13 March 2004 36	Plymouth Argyle	2–1	Swindon Town	Home Park, Plymouth
15:00	Keith 11'; Evans 84'		Mooney 90'	Attendance: 16,080; Referee: P Walton

16 March 2004 37	Plymouth Argyle	2–0	Peterborough United	Home Park, Plymouth
19:45	Lowndes 55'; Wotton 79' (pen.)			Attendance: 13,110; Referee: Joe Ross

20 March 2004 38	Luton Town	1–1	Plymouth Argyle	Kenilworth Road, Luton
15:00	Coyne 42'		Adams 90'	Attendance: 8,499; Referee: Graham Salisbury

27 March 2004 39	Plymouth Argyle	0–0	Wrexham	Home Park, Plymouth
15:00				Attendance: 12,275; Referee: P Taylor

3 April 2004 40	Barnsley	1–0	Plymouth Argyle	Oakwell, Barnsley
15:00	Birch 81'			Attendance: 9,266; Referee: Mark Clattenburg

10 April 2004 41	Plymouth Argyle	2–1	Wycombe Wanderers	Home Park, Plymouth
15:00	Coughlan 39'; Evans 80'		Tyson 5'	Attendance: 14,806; Referee: D R Crick

13 April 2004 42	Bristol City	1–0	Plymouth Argyle	Ashton Gate, Bristol
19:45	Peacock 85'			Attendance: 19,045; Referee: R Pearson

17 April 2004 43	Oldham Athletic	4–1	Plymouth Argyle	Boundary Park, Oldham
15:00	Johnson 34'; Owen 42'; Eyres 45'; Murray 67'		Wotton 51'	Attendance: 6,924; Referee: M Cowburn

24 April 2004 44	Plymouth Argyle	2–0	Queens Park Rangers	Home Park, Plymouth
15:00	Evans 81'; Friio 86'			Attendance: 19,888; Referee: Paul Durkin

1 May 2004 45	Hartlepool	1–3	Plymouth Argyle	Victoria Park (Hartlepool)
15:00	Boyd 11'		Hodges 12'; Lowndes 42'; Tinkler 48' (o.g.)	Attendance: 7,437; Referee: Anthony Leake

8 May 2004 46	Plymouth Argyle	2–0	Colchester United	Home Park, Plymouth
15:00	Friio 17'; Norris 47'			Attendance: 19,868; Referee: A R Hall

Last updated: 8 November 2014
Source:Soccerbase

== FA Cup ==
=== Matches ===
8 November 2003 Round One	Northampton	3–2	Plymouth Argyle	Sixfields Stadium, Northampton
15:00	Walker 37'; Hargreaves 60'; Asamoah 83'		Friio 32'; Stonebridge 63'	Attendance: 4,385; Referee: L Cable

Last updated: 9 November 2014
Source:Soccerbase

== League Cup ==
=== Matches ===
12 August 2003 Round One	Colchester United	2–1	Plymouth Argyle	Layer Road, Colchester
19:45	Fagan 22'; Pinault 40'		Evans 24'	Attendance: 2,367; Referee: Joe Ross

Last updated: 9 November 2014
Source:Soccerbase

== Football League Trophy ==
=== Matches ===
14 October 2003 Round One	Plymouth Argyle	4–0	Bristol City	Home Park, Plymouth
19:45	Keith 10'; Lowndes 45', 86'; Gilbert 55'			Attendance: 4,927; Referee: D R Crick

4 November 2003 Round Two	Plymouth Argyle	2–2 (2–4 p)	Wycombe Wanderers	Home Park, Plymouth
19:45	Coughlan 22'; Evans 34'		McSporran 8', 15'	Attendance: 4,298; Referee: B Curson

Last updated: 9 November 2014
Source:Soccerbase

== Notable events ==
- 22 October 2003: Plymouth Argyle defeat Sheffield Wednesday 3–1 at Hillsborough to go top of Division Two.
- 24 October 2003: Argyle receive performance of the week award for their 5–1 victory over Port Vale.
- 1 November 2003: Paul Sturrock named Division Two Manager of the Month for October.
- 6 November 2003: David Friio announced as Division Two player of the month for October.
- 23 December 2003: Paul Sturrock signs a four-and-a-half-year contract with Argyle.
- 26 December 2003: Paul Wotton scores Argyle's 5000th League goal in a 2–0 victory over AFC Bournemouth. Plymouth Argyle become the first League side to score 50 goals in that season.
- 2 January 2004: Paul Sturrock named Division Two Manager of the Month for December.
- 3 January 2004: David Friio scores the first hat-trick for Argyle since Paul McGregor in March 2000.
- 6 January 2004: Paul Sturrock named as winner of the second quarter of the League managers Association's Tissot Managers' Performance League.
- 17 January 2004: Billy Rafferty and Paul Mariner make a guest appearance at Home Park. Argyle played Rushden & Diamonds on that day and won 3–0.
- 5 February 2004: Graham Coughlan announced as Division Two player of the month for January.
- 19 February 2004: The club's first retail outlet in Plymouth city centre opens. The club also unveils next season's away kit – the first to be voted for by fans.
- 2 March 2004: Plymouth Argyle complete the second "double" over Sheffield Wednesday in their history, by beating them for a second time in the season. Argyle won the match 2–0.
- 3 March 2004: Paul Sturrock agrees personal terms to take over as Southampton manager.
- 4 March 2004: Sturrock is unveiled by Southampton as their new manager at a press conference.
- 17 March 2004: The club announces that next year's away kit will be white, instead of tangerine, due to supporter demands.
- 27 March 2004: One hundred former Argyle players returned to Home Park for the game against Wrexham.
- 31 March 2004: Tony Capaldi becomes the first Plymouth Argyle player to win a cap for a home nation since Dave Phillips (Wales) in 1984. Capaldi plays for Northern Ireland.
- 10 April 2004: It becomes mathematically certain that Plymouth Argyle will achieve promotion or a play-off place, following a 2–1 win over Wycombe Wanderers.
- 20 April 2004: Bobby Williamson is unveiled as the permanent successor to Paul Sturrock, following much speculation about the managerial vacancy.
- 24 April 2004: A 2–0 win over Queens Park Rangers hands Argyle both promotion and the Division Two title.
- 6 May 2004: Graham Coughlan is named as the Division Two player of the season.
- 8 May 2004: Mickey Evans is announced as the club's player of the season and Luke McCormick as the most promising player as decided by fans. Plymouth Argyle are presented with the Division Two trophy after their 2–0 win over Colchester United
- 17 May 2004: Paul Sturrock is named as the Division Two manager of the season for his efforts at Argyle.
- 21 May 2004: The club holds its centenary ball to celebrate the previous season. The Plymouth Argyle team of the century, decided by supporters, is announced.

== Transfers ==
=== Out ===
Date	Player	Transfer	To	Fee
12 September 2003	Brian McGlinchey	Three month loan	Torquay United	-
24 September 2003	Joe Broad	Sale	Torquay United	Free
2 October 2003	David Beresford	One month loan	Macclesfield Town	-
4 November 2003	David Beresford	Sale	Tranmere Rovers	Free
9 January 2004	Jani Viander	Sale	Brentford	Free
13 January 2004	Brian McGlinchey	Sale	Torquay United	Free
1 June 2004	Martin Phillips	Release	–	–
1 June 2004	Jason Bent	Release	–	–
1 June 2004	Eugene Kangulungu	Release	–	–
1 June 2004	Wayne O'Sullivan	Release	–	–
6 July 2004	Matthew Villis	Season loan	Torquay United	-
30 July 2004	Ian Stonebridge	Sale	Wycombe Wanderers	Free
