= Trought =

Trought is a surname. Notable people with the surname include:

- Mike Trought (born 1980), English footballer
- Stuart Trought, former President of the States of Alderney
