= Lee Archer =

Lee Archer may refer to:

- Lee Archer (pilot) (1919–2010), a Tuskegee Airman in the U.S. Army Air Corps during World War II
- Lee Archer (footballer) (born 1972), English former professional footballer
- John Lee Archer (1791–1852), architect and engineer
