= Jamie Cureton =

English footballer (born 1975)

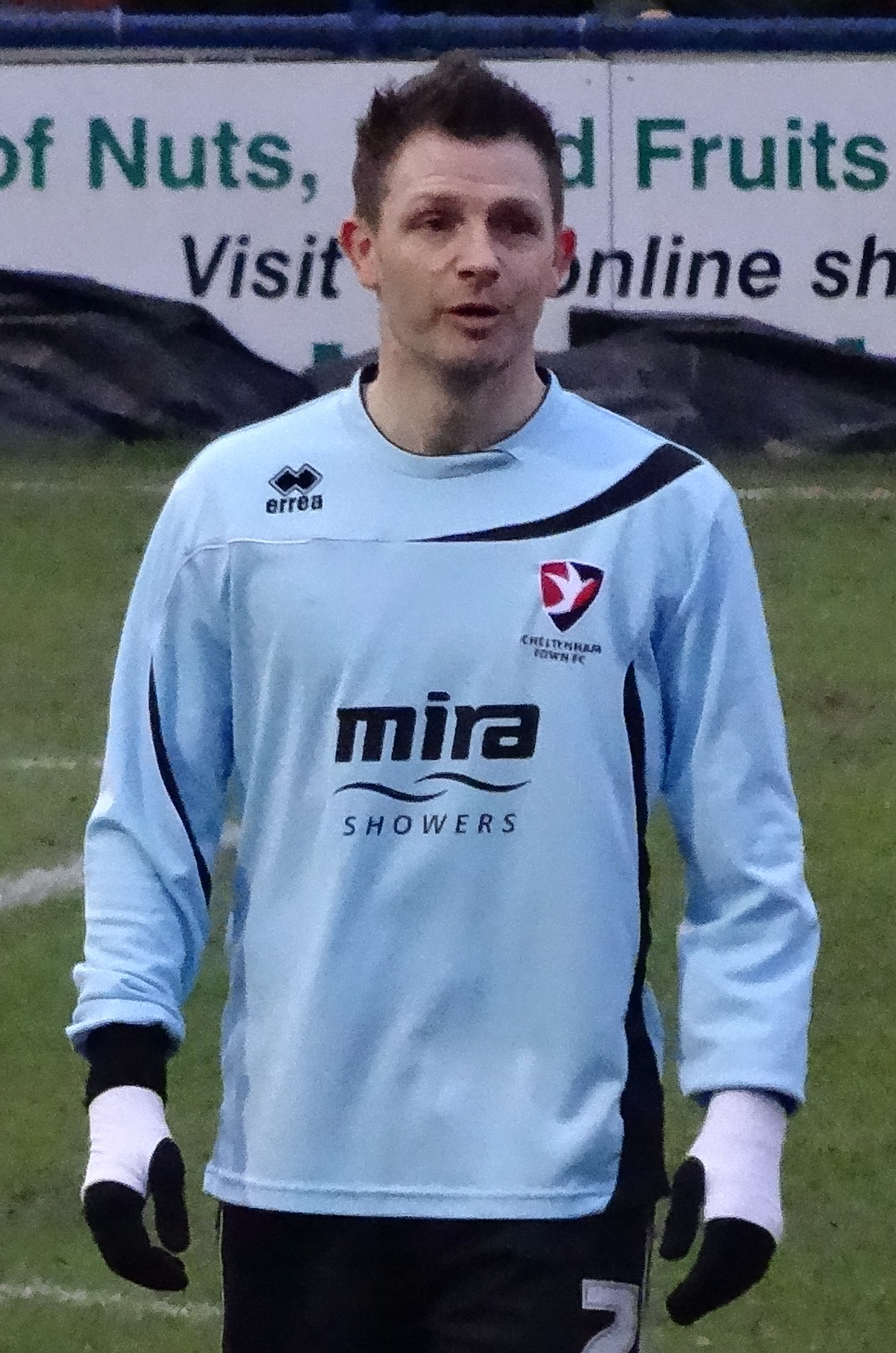
- Cureton playing for Cheltenham Town in 2014

Personal information
- Full name: Jamie Cureton
- Date of birth: 28 August 1975 (age 51)
- Place of birth: Bristol, England
- Height: 1.73 m (5 ft 8 in)
- Position: Striker

Team information
- Current team: Clevedon Town (player-manager)

Youth career
- Bristol Rovers
- Southampton
- 1988–1993: Norwich City

Senior career*
Years	Team	Apps	(Gls)
1993–1996	Norwich City	29	(6)
1995–1996	→ AFC Bournemouth (loan)	5	(0)
1996	→ Bristol Rovers (loan)	6	(4)
1996–2000	Bristol Rovers	168	(68)
2000–2003	Reading	108	(50)
2003–2004	Busan I'Cons	21	(4)
2004–2005	Queens Park Rangers	43	(6)
2005–2006	Swindon Town	30	(7)
2005–2006	→ Colchester United (loan)	8	(4)
2006–2007	Colchester United	44	(23)
2007–2010	Norwich City	69	(16)
2008–2009	→ Barnsley (loan)	8	(2)
2010	→ Shrewsbury Town (loan)	12	(0)
2010–2011	Exeter City	41	(17)
2011–2012	Leyton Orient	19	(1)
2012	→ Exeter City (loan)	7	(1)
2012–2013	Exeter City	40	(21)
2013–2014	Cheltenham Town	35	(11)
2014–2016	Dagenham & Redbridge	83	(26)
2016	Farnborough	7	(8)
2016	Eastleigh	7	(1)
2016	Farnborough	1	(1)
2016–2017	St Albans City	15	(4)
2017	→ Farnborough (dual registration)	8	(6)
2017–2018	Farnborough	23	(10)
2018–2020	Bishop's Stortford	82	(47)
2019–2020	→ Enfield (dual registration)	2	(0)
2020	Hornchurch	8	(2)
2020–2023	Enfield	22	(5)
2024	Maldon & Tiptree	2	(0)
2024–2025	Cambridge City	3	(0)
2025–2026	Kings Park Rangers	19	(12)
2026	Holland	0	(0)
2026–	Clevedon Town	0	(0)

International career
1993	England U18	4	(1)

Managerial career
- 2018–2019: Bishop's Stortford (joint)
- 2019–2020: Bishop's Stortford
- 2020–2023: Enfield
- 2024–2025: Cambridge City
- 2025–2026: Kings Park Rangers
- 2026–: Clevedon Town
- * Club domestic league appearances and goals as of 20 October 2026 (UTC)

Jamie Cureton (born 28 August 1975) is an English football coach and player who plays as a striker. He is currently a player-manager for Clevedon Town.

Cureton began his career at Norwich City in 1994, and after the club's relegation from the Premier League, spent 21 seasons competing in The Football League, as well as one season at South Korean side Busan I'Cons in 2003. Subsequently, he has continued his career with several non-league clubs, including periods as a player-coach and player-manager.

He is one of the few footballers to have made over 1,050 competitive appearances (nearly 1,100) and has scored 402 goals across the course of his career, which has spanned ten tiers of the football pyramid from the Premier League to the Eastern Counties Division One North. He is the only player to have scored in the top 10 divisions of the English football pyramid.

Cureton's longest associations have been with Norwich City (five seasons), Bristol Rovers and Enfield (four seasons each). His 2022–23 Essex Senior Football League title with Enfield and his 2025–26 Eastern Counties Division One North title with Kings Park Rangers, both as player-manager, are his only club trophies, though he has been part of five promotions and won the 2006–07 Football League Championship Golden Boot.

== Playing career ==
=== Early years ===
Born in Bristol, Cureton began his professional career with Norwich City, before moving on to Bristol Rovers. In 1993, he turned down an offer from Manchester United to stay at Carrow Road. An England youth international, he achieved significant status with the Norwich fans when he dyed his hair yellow and green for an East Anglian Derby game against Ipswich Town in 1996 and subsequently scoring in the same fixture. He was sold by Mike Walker to Bristol Rovers in 1996.

=== Bristol Rovers ===
Cureton enjoyed a prolific spell at his hometown club. This was particularly the case during the 1999–2000 season where he struck up a partnership with Jason Roberts that almost took the club to promotion. After the club dipped out of the play-off places on the final day of the season he decided his future lay with pastures new, and headed to Reading.

=== Reading ===
Cureton moved to Reading in 2000, playing there for three years. While at the club, Cureton discovered a star in the "Perseus" constellation and named it after himself. Here he struck a formidable partnership with Martin Butler, becoming one of the most feared combinations in the Football League. In his first season (2000–01), he scored 30 goals, including a goal in the play-off final against Walsall, a game which Reading went on to lose 3–2. The following season however, it was Cureton who scored the goal to get Reading promoted. He scored the equaliser against Brentford in the closing stages, with a deft flick to help it over the keeper, into the corner of the net.

=== Busan I'Cons ===
Cureton then made a mid-2003 switch to K League side Busan I'Cons (now Busan IPark), playing under former Chelsea manager Ian Porterfield. He failed to settle in East Asia however, describing the move as "another big mistake" in 2014. Cureton's time playing in South Korea is documented in the book, Who Ate All the Squid?: Football Adventures in South Korea.

=== Return to England ===
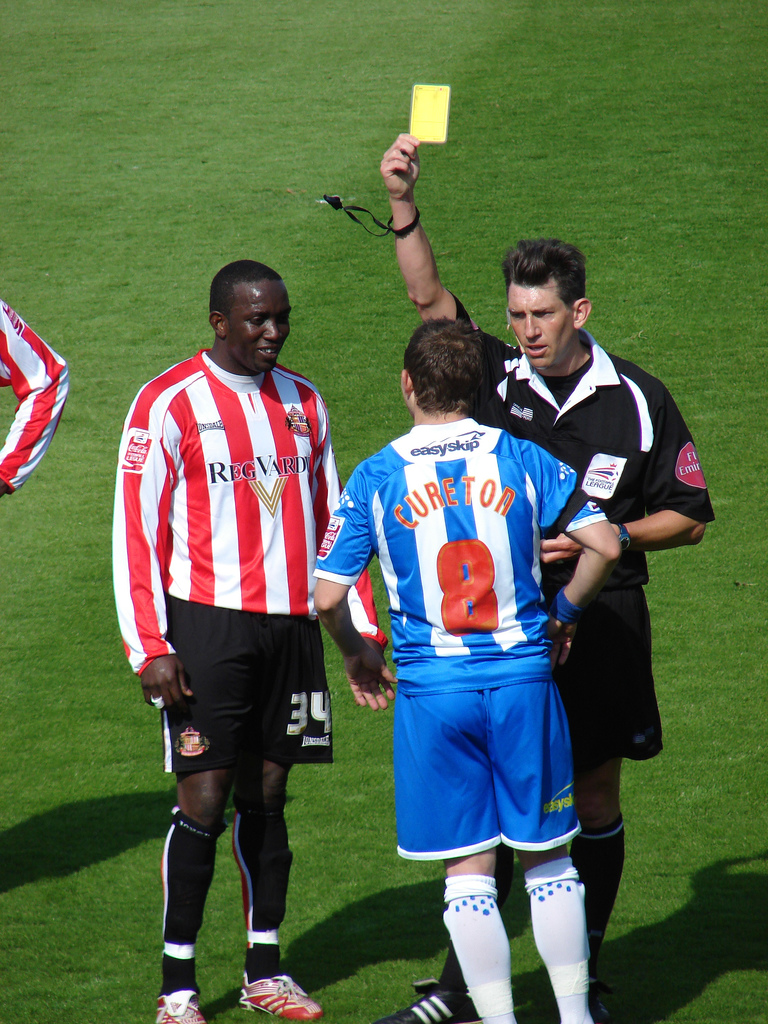
Cureton receiving a yellow card during a 2007 match for Colchester against Sunderland.

After being released from his contract at Busan, he returned to England and joined Queens Park Rangers on 30 January 2004. One of the more memorable of the six goals he scored there was a volley from a tight angle against Coventry City which echoed Marco Van Basten's goal against USSR in the Euro 1988 final. After a mostly unsettled season at Loftus Road though, he joined Swindon Town in June 2005.

He failed to make his mark in his first spell at the club and subsequently joined Colchester United on loan. He then briefly returned to Swindon Town as they failed to avoid relegation to League Two. After Swindon's relegation, Cureton activated a clause in his contract that allowed him to leave Swindon on a free transfer, and rejoined Colchester on a permanent basis. His first full season with the U's proved to be hugely successful as the Essex club managed a 10th-place finish in the Championship, partnering Chris Iwelumo.

One of Cureton's main highlights in a Colchester shirt was the hat-trick he scored in the 3–0 away win against Essex rivals Southend United on 7 April 2007.

His 23 goals in the 2006–07 season gave him the Championship Golden Boot as the league's top scorer, and made him the first Colchester United striker since Tony Adcock to score 20 league goals in a season; the first for 22 years.

On 5 June 2007, due to agent demands, Cureton handed in a transfer request to Colchester United, citing Colchester's ambitions differing from his own. This inevitably fuelled speculation that Cureton might return to Norwich City, the club where he began his career. Cureton himself stated that he would like to return to the club.

Colchester initially rejected the transfer request, saying that Cureton was an important part of the club's future and that they wanted to keep him, though Norwich City manager Peter Grant confirmed that he would like to sign Cureton. Cureton moved to Norwich City for £825,000 on 29 June 2007. He was signed as a replacement for Robert Earnshaw, Norwich's top scorer of the 2006–07 season, who left for Derby County in a £3.5 million deal the same day.

=== Norwich City ===
After his success at Colchester United, Cureton returned to Norwich City. He scored two goals in the League Cup against Barnet and two on his league debut for Norwich against Southampton. Cureton continued to play very much a bit part during the season and one of his goals came during the Canaries' 1–0 win at Scunthorpe United, a victory that lifted Norwich clear of the relegation places ahead of the Christmas and New Year fixtures.

Due to lack of first team football, on 27 November 2008, Cureton joined Barnsley on a 3-month loan deal, but on 14 January 2009, he was recalled to Norwich City after Glenn Roeder's termination as manager.

When Norwich played Barnsley on the following weekend, the Canaries were 4–0 victors with Cureton scoring their second. Cureton played his 100th game for Norwich City against Coventry but put in a bad performance and was dropped for the rest of the season.

The following season, newly appointed manager Paul Lambert started Cureton for the first three games, only to drop him to the bench for the next two games, leaving him an unused sub for both.

Cureton scored his first two goals of the season, against Leyton Orient and Bristol Rovers, both in which he came on as a late sub. Cureton scored the winning penalty in a Football League Trophy match against Swindon. However this was to be his last appearance for Norwich as after this he failed to even secure a place on the bench. After being loaned out to Shrewsbury for the remainder of the season Cureton was released by Norwich City.

Cureton joined Shrewsbury Town on loan until the end of the 2009–10 season on 16 February 2010 from Norwich.

=== Exeter City and Leyton Orient ===
Cureton spent the 2010 pre-season on trial with Exeter City, stating he would like to link up with a club closer to his Bristol home, and joined on a short-term deal in August 2010. A contract extension saw him continue with the Grecians until the end of 2010–11, a season in which he finished as the club's top scorer, with 20 goals in all competitions, and won the Supporter's Player of the Year and Player's Player of the Year awards. A deal was offered for Cureton to stay at Exeter for 2011-12 was declined by Cureton, who instead joined Leyton Orient in June 2011. He scored his first and only goal for the O's on 7 January 2012, in a 4–1 loss at Carlisle United, before re-joining Exeter on loan just under two months later. He scored one goal in seven appearances as the Grecians were relegated from League One. Cureton was released by Orient after the expiry of his contract in May 2012, and signed a permanent deal with Exeter in July 2012. He played 42 games in 2012–13, scoring 21 goals, but was released at the end of the season.

=== Cheltenham Town ===
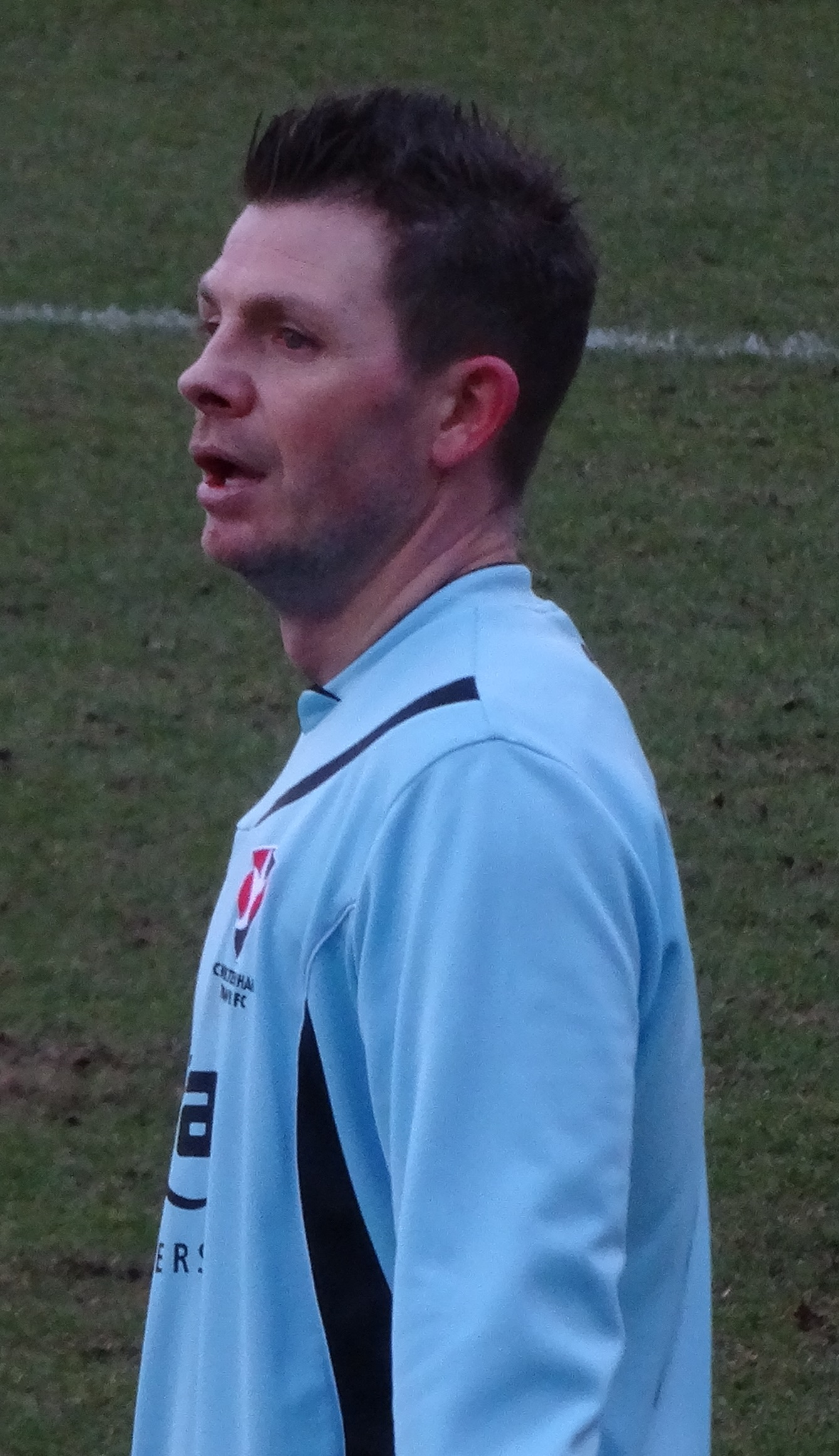
Cureton playing for Cheltenham Town in 2014

On 17 June 2013, it was announced that Cureton had agreed terms on a one-year deal with Cheltenham Town. He ended the season with 11 goals in 36 appearances which included 12 substitute appearances. He was released by the club on 7 May 2014.

=== Dagenham & Redbridge ===
On 24 July 2014, Cureton agreed a one-year deal with League Two side Dagenham & Redbridge, the 14th club of his senior career. Following the retirements of Ryan Giggs and Kevin Phillips and Ian Goodison's departure from Tranmere Rovers, 39-year-old Cureton was the oldest onfield player in all four of England's top divisions. He was awarded Player of the Year 2014–15 at the Daggers on the last home game of the season.

=== Later career ===
Cureton signed a short-term contract with Farnborough in August 2016, before moving to Eastleigh of the National League the following month. In early December, he departed Eastleigh after a change of management, and briefly re-joined Farnborough, scoring in his first game since returning to the club in a 3–2 home defeat against Hanwell Town, before joining St Albans City that same month. He returned to Farnborough in April 2017 on dual registration for the remainder of the 2016–17 season, and in July a permanent deal of one year was agreed. Having scored ten goals in 23 league appearances for Farnborough, Cureton joined Bishop's Stortford midway through the 2017–18 season, making his début in a 3–0 defeat to Royston Town on 1 January 2018. In April 2019, Cureton reached the landmark of 1,000 senior club appearances, scoring twice as Bishop's Stortford beat Brightlingsea Regent 3–2. In 2019 he signed dual registration terms with Enfield, who groundshare with Bishop's Stortford. After being sent off eight minutes into his debut on 8 October, he scored in his second appearance on 24 October, becoming the first player to score in the top nine levels of English football. In February 2020, Cureton signed for Isthmian Premier League side Hornchurch. In June 2020, following a brief spell at the club in the 2019–20 season, Cureton signed for Enfield.

On 7 October 2023, Cureton, after announcing his retirement from senior football, joined fellow Isthmian League side Maldon & Tiptree as a coach and was part of the coaching staff for his first game against former club Enfield. He came out of retirement as a player in March 2024, appearing as a late substitute in Maldon & Tiptree's 1–0 defeat to Wroxham on 2 March.

During the 2024–25 season, Cureton again returned from retirement while manager of Cambridge City, making his début for the club, aged 49, on 5 April 2025, as a late substitute in a 1–2 loss to Ipswich Wanderers. As player-manager he played the full 90 minutes in their 1–0 win vs Sporting Bengal on 21 April 2025 in the last home game of the season.

In October 2025, Cureton joined Eastern Counties League Division One North club Kings Park Rangers. He made his league debut for the club on 18 October, as a second-half substitute in a 4–0 win over Diss Town. On 25 October, he scored his first goal for the club, becoming the first player to score in all of the top ten divisions in English football.

On 25 August 2026, Eastern Counties League Division One North club Holland announced the signing of Cureton.

== International career ==
In 1993, he made four appearances for England U18 and scored one goal in them.

In addition, he has made appearances for England's veterans national team.

== Coaching career ==
Cureton was appointed as an assistant coach at Arsenal's academy in September 2017.

Following the resignation of Adam Flint in September 2018, Cureton became manager of Bishop's Stortford alongside club owner Steve Smith, as an interim to begin with. They guided Stortford to a seventh-place finish in the Isthmian Premier that season. In October 2019 he took sole charge of the position.

In September 2020, he was appointed manager while still an active player at Enfield, becoming player-manager. During the 2022–23 season, Cureton guided Enfield to the Essex Senior League title and promotion to the eighth tier. He departed the club on 11 September 2023.

On 7 October 2023, Cureton joined fellow Isthmian League side Maldon & Tiptree as a coach and was part of the coaching staff for his first game against former club Enfield.

On 17 May 2024, Cureton was appointed manager of Isthmian League North Division club Cambridge City.

On 17 September 2025, Cureton was relieved of his position at Cambridge City owing to the club's poor start to the season; the club sat 18th in the Isthmian League North Division, having won only four points in their first seven games.

On 31 December 2025, Cureton was appointed player-manager of King's Park Rangers.

On 2 October 2026, Cureton was appointed manager of Clevedon Town.

== Personal life ==
In 2026, his autobiography called 'Last of the Goalhangers: The man who completed English football' was published.

== Career statistics ==
As of match played 25 August 2026

Appearances and goals by club, season and competition
Club	Season	League			FA Cup		League Cup		Other		Total	
Club	Season	Division	Apps	Goals	Apps	Goals	Apps	Goals	Apps	Goals	Apps	Goals
Norwich City	1994–95	Premier League	17	4	2	0	1	0	—		20	4
Norwich City	1995–96	First Division	12	2	0	0	0	0	—		12	2
Norwich City	Total		29	6	2	0	1	0	—		32	6
AFC Bournemouth (loan)	1995–96	Second Division	5	0	—		—		1 (Note: Appearance(s) in Football League Trophy)	0	6	0
Bristol Rovers	1996–97	Second Division	38	11	1	0	0	0	1	0	40	11
Bristol Rovers	1997–98	Second Division	43	13	2	0	2	0	2	1	49	14
Bristol Rovers	1998–99	Second Division	46	25	6	2	2	1	1	1	55	29
Bristol Rovers	1999–2000	Second Division	46	22	1	0	4	1	2	1	53	24
Bristol Rovers	2000–01	Second Division	1	1	—		—		—		1	1
Bristol Rovers	Total		174	72	10	2	8	2	6	3	198	79
Reading	2000–01	Second Division	43	26	3	1	2	1	5 (Note: Two appearances and one goal in Football League Trophy, three appearances and one goal in Second Division play-offs)	2	53	30
Reading	2001–02	Second Division	38	15	2	1	2	0	0	0	42	16
Reading	2002–03	First Division	27	9	2	0	1	0	2 (Note: Appearances in First Division play-offs)	0	32	9
Reading	Total		108	50	7	2	5	1	7	2	127	55
Busan I'Cons	2003	K League	21	4	—		—		—		21	4
Queens Park Rangers	2003–04	Second Division	13	2	—		—		—		13	2
Queens Park Rangers	2004–05	Championship	30	4	1	0	2	1	—		33	5
Queens Park Rangers	Total		43	6	1	0	2	1	0	0	46	7
Swindon Town	2005–06	League One	30	7	—		1	0	1	0	32	7
Colchester United (loan)	2005–06	League One	8	4	2	3	—		—		10	7
Colchester United	2006–07	Championship	44	23	1	1	1	0	—		46	24
Colchester United	Total		52	27	3	4	1	0	0	0	56	31
Norwich City	2007–08	Championship	41	12	2	0	2	2	—		45	14
Norwich City	2008–09	Championship	22	2	0	0	1	0	—		23	2
Norwich City	2009–10	League One	6	2	0	0	0	0	2	0	8	2
Norwich City	Total		69	16	2	0	3	2	2	0	76	18
Barnsley (loan)	2008–09	Championship	8	2	—		—		—		8	2
Shrewsbury Town (loan)	2009–10	League Two	12	0	—		—		—		12	0
Exeter City	2010–11	League One	41	17	1	0	0	0	5	3	47	20
Leyton Orient	2011–12	League One	19	1	2	0	2	0	0	0	23	1
Exeter City (loan)	2011–12	League One	7	1	—		—		—		7	1
Exeter City	2012–13	League Two	40	21	1	0	1	0	1	0	43	21
Exeter City	Total		47	22	1	0	1	0	1	0	50	22
Cheltenham Town	2013–14	League Two	35	11	1	0	0	0	0	0	36	11
Dagenham & Redbridge	2014–15	League Two	45	19	2	0	1	1	0	0	48	20
Dagenham & Redbridge	2015–16	League Two	38	7	5	1	0	0	2	1	45	9
Dagenham & Redbridge	Total		83	26	7	1	1	1	2	1	93	29
Farnborough	2016–17	SL Division One Central	7	8	3	1	—		—		10	9
Eastleigh	2016–17	National League	7	1	—		—		—		7	1
Farnborough	2016–17	SL Division One Central	1	1	—		—		—		1	1
St Albans City	2016–17	National League South	15	4	—		—		2 (Note: One appearance and one goal in Herts Senior Cup, one in Herts Charity Cup)	1	17	5
Farnborough	2016–17	SL Division One Central	8	6	—		—		—		8	6
Farnborough	2017–18	SL Premier Division	23	10	1	0	—		7	3	31	13
Farnborough	Total		31	16	1	0	—		7	3	39	19
Bishop's Stortford	2017–18	SL Premier Division	20	9	0	0	—		0	0	20	9
Bishop's Stortford	2018–19	IL Premier Division	36	22	1	0	—		6	3	43	25
Bishop's Stortford	2019–20	IL Premier Division	26	16	2	2	—		3	0	31	18
Bishop's Stortford	Total		82	47	3	2	—		9	3	94	52
Enfield	2019–20	Essex Senior League	2	0	0	0	—		0	0	2	0
Hornchurch	2019–20	IL Premier Division	8	2	0	0	—		0	0	8	2
Enfield	2020–21	Essex Senior League	7	2	0	0	—		2	0	9	2
Enfield	2021–22	Essex Senior League	15	3	0	0	—		2	3	17	6
Enfield	2022–23	Essex Senior League	0	0	0	0	—		1	0	1	0
Enfield	Total		22	5	0	0	—		5	3	27	8
Maldon & Tiptree	2023–24	IL Division One North	2	0	0	0	—		1	0	3	0
Cambridge City	2024–25	IL Division One North	3	0	0	0	—		0	0	3	0
Cambridge City	2025–26	IL Division One North	0	0	0	0	—		0	0	0	0
Kings Park Rangers	2025–26	Eastern Counties Division One North	19	12	—		—		2	0	21	12
Holland	2026–27	Eastern Counties Division One North	0	0	0	0	1	0	0	0	1	0
Clevedon Town	2026–27	Western Football League Premier Division	0	0	0	0	0	0	0	0	0	0
Career total			975	363	44	12	26	7	51	19	1,096	402

== Honours ==
=== As a player ===
Reading

- Football League Second Division runner-up: 2001–02

Queens Park Rangers

- Football League Second Division runner-up: 2003–04

Individual

- Football League Championship Golden Boot: 2006–07
- PFA Team of the Year: 2012–13 League Two

=== As a player-manager ===
Enfield

- Essex Senior Football League Champions: 2022–23

Kings Park Rangers

- Eastern Counties Division One North: 2025–26

== See also ==
- List of men's footballers with the most official appearances
