= 2001 FA Trophy final =

2001 FA Trophy Final
- Event: 2000–01 FA Trophy
Canvey Island	Forest Green Rovers
1	0
- Date: 13 May 2001
- Venue: Villa Park, Birmingham
- Referee: Alan Wiley
- Attendance: 10,007

The 2001 FA Trophy Final was the 32nd final of The Football Association's cup competition for levels 5–8 of the English football league system. It was contested by Canvey Island and Forest Green Rovers on 13 May 2001 at Villa Park, Birmingham.

Canvey Island won the match 1-0 thanks to a goal from Ben Chenery in a final held away from the old Wembley Stadium as work was beginning on building the new Wembley Stadium. A crowd of 10,007 were in attendance.

== Route to the final ==
=== Canvey Island ===
Second round	Harlow Town	2–2	Canvey Island	Harlow
15:00

Second round replay	Canvey Island	2–0	Harlow Town	Canvey Island
19:45

Third round	Canvey Island	5–1	Northwood	Canvey Island
15:00		Report		Attendance: 302

Fourth round	Bilston Town	0–1	Canvey Island	Bilston
15:00		Report	Parmenter 34'	Attendance: 536

Fifth round	Canvey Island	1–1	Stevenage Borough	Canvey Island
15:00	Vaughan 6'	Report	Illman 19'	Attendance: 1,010

Fifth round replay	Stevenage Borough	0–0 (2–4 p)	Canvey Island	Stevenage
19:45		Report		Attendance: 1,148

Quarter-finals	Canvey Island	1–0	Telford United	Canvey Island
15:00	Jones 26'	Report		Attendance: 807

Semi-finals 1st leg	Canvey Island	2–0	Chester City	Canvey Island
15:00		Report		Attendance: 1,221

Semi-finals 2nd leg	Chester City	0–2 (0–4 agg.)	Canvey Island	Chester
15:00				Stadium: Deva Stadium

=== Forest Green Rovers ===
Third round	Forest Green Rovers	6–1	Barton Rovers	Nailsworth
15:00				Stadium: The Lawn

Fourth round	Matlock Town	2–2	Forest Green Rovers	Matlock
15:00

Fourth round replay	Forest Green Rovers	3–1	Matlock Town	Nailsworth
19:45				Stadium: The Lawn

Fifth round	Forest Green Rovers	2–0	Rushden & Diamonds	Nailsworth
15:00				Stadium: The Lawn

Quarter-finals	Forest Green Rovers	2–1	Worksop Town	Nailsworth
15:00				Stadium: The Lawn

Semi-finals 1st leg	Forest Green Rovers	2–2	Hereford United	Nailsworth
15:00				Stadium: The Lawn

Semi-finals 2nd leg	Hereford United	1–4 (3–6 agg.)	Forest Green Rovers	Hereford
19:45				Stadium: Edgar Street

== Match ==
=== Details ===
13 May 2001
15:00 BST

Canvey Island	1–0	Forest Green Rovers
Chenery 16'	Report

Villa Park, Birmingham
Attendance: 10,007
Referee: Alan Wiley (Burntwood)

(England) Ashley Harrison
(England) John Kennedy
(England) Chris Duffy
(England) Ben Chenery
(England) Mick Bodley
(England) Steve Ward
(England) Steve Tilson
(England) Mark Stimson (substituted off) 84'
(England) Neil Gregory
(England) Wayne Vaughan (substituted off) 75'
(England) Steve Parmenter
Substitutes:
(England) Mickey Bennett
(England) Andy Jones (substituted on) 75'
(England) Adam Miller
(England) Adam Tanner (substituted on) 84'
(England) Mark Loxton
Manager:
(England) Jeff King

(England) Stephen Perrin
(England) Rob Cousins
(England) Adam Lockwood
(England) Adrian Foster
(England) Billy Clark
(England) Chris Burns
(England) Tony Daley
(England) Jason Drysdale (substituted off) 46'
(England) Martin Foster (substituted off) 74'
(England) Alex Meechan
(England) Stuart Slater
Substitutes:
(England) Paul Hunt (substituted on) 74'
(England) Ian Hedges
(England) Frankie Bennett (substituted on) 46'
(England) Luke Price
(England) Matthew Ghent
Manager:
(England) Nigel Spink & Dave Norton

Match rules

- 90 minutes.
- 30 minutes of extra time if necessary.
- Penalty shootout if scores still level.
- Five named substitutes.
- Maximum of three substitutions.
