= John Kennedy (English footballer) =

English footballer

Personal information
- Full name: John Kennedy
- Date of birth: 19 August 1978 (age 48)
- Place of birth: Newmarket, England
- Position: Midfielder

Youth career
- Ipswich Town

Senior career*
| Years | Team | Apps | (Gls) |
| 1997–1999 | Ipswich Town | 8 | (0) |
| 1998 | → Morecambe (loan) | | |
| 1998 | → Morecambe (loan) | | |
| 2000–2006 | Canvey Island | 88 | (6) |
| 2006–2009 | Histon | 112 | (9) |
| 2009–2011 | Cambridge City | 53 | (1) |
| 2011–2022 | Bury Town | 187 | (1) |

International career
| 2002–2004 | England National Game XI | | |
- * Club domestic league appearances and goals as of end of 2017–18 season

John Kennedy (born 19 August 1978) is an English former footballer.

== Career ==
Born in Newmarket, Kennedy joined the Ipswich Town yuioth system, signing professionally in July 1995. He made his Ipswich debut as a substitute on 20 December 1997 in a 3–1 win at Port Vale. That was his only Town appearance of the 1997–98 season and he was loaned to Morecambe in March, returning in May. He was loaned to Morecambe again between August and October 1998, before returning to Ipswich and going on to make seven first team appearances in the remainder of the 1998–99 season.

Kennedy failed to make a first team appearance in 1999–2000 and was released at the end of the season.

After a trial at Darlington, he signed for Canvey Island in August 2000. He won the FA Trophy with Canvey in 2000–01, and was voted man of the match in the final. He was selected for the Middlesex Wanderers touring team in 2002. Later in 2002 he was selected for the England National Game squad for a match against Italy, the only player from outside the Football Conference. Although he scored on his debut, England lost 3–2. He was selected again for a match against Belgium the following February, and for a match against the United States in June 2004.

Kennedy remained at Canvey until July 2006, when he signed for Histon. He left Histon in December 2009 to sign for Cambridge City, before moving onto Bury Town in 2011. After eleven years at Bury, he retired at the end of the 2021–22 season.

== Honours ==
Canvey Island

- FA Trophy: 2000–01
