= Barry McConnell =

English footballer

Personal information
- Full name: Barry McConnell
- Date of birth: 1 January 1977 (age 49)
- Place of birth: Exeter, England
- Height: 5 ft 10 in (1.78 m)
- Position: Defender

Team information
- Current team: Exmouth Town

Youth career
- Exeter City

Senior career*
| Years | Team | Apps | (Gls) |
| 1995–2005 | Exeter City | 167 | (19) |
| 2000 | → Weston-super-Mare (loan) | ? | (?) |
| 2005 | Tamworth | 2 | (0) |
| 2005–2006 | Forest Green Rovers | 4 | (0) |
| 2006 | Tiverton Town | ? | (?) |
| 2006 | Weston-super-Mare | ? | (?) |
| 2007 | Dorchester Town | ? | (?) |
| 2007–2008 | Weston-super-Mare | ? | (?) |
| 2008–2012 | Truro City | ? | (?) |
| 2012–2014 | Weymouth | ? | (?) |
| 2014 – | Exmouth Town | ? | (?) |
- * Club domestic league appearances and goals as of 03:24, 15 June 2013 (UTC)

Barry McConnell (born 1 January 1977) is an English footballer who plays for Exmouth Town. He is primarily a right sided defender or midfielder.

== Career ==
Born in Exeter, Devon, McConnell originally came through Exeter City's youth system in 1995, and was a first-team player for almost 10 years, featuring in a variety of positions. He also had a testimonial match against Charlton Athletic in which a host of big names played such as Danny Murphy. Exeter lost the game 4-1 and McConnell did not start but he came on to convert a penalty.

Upon his departure in December 2005, he spent a brief period with Tamworth before moving to Forest Green Rovers whom he left at the end of the 2005/2006 season.

He began the 2006–2007 season with Tiverton Town and had a short spell with Weston-super-Mare before signing an 18-month contract with Dorchester in February 2007, but Dorchester later released him.

In the 2007–2008 season McConnell again linked up with Weston after being signed by new manager Tony Ricketts. This marked his third stint at the club and he featured regularly in the first team. He made over 30 appearances for the club before signing with Truro after the close of the 2007–08 season.
