= Matt Villis =

English footballer

Personal information
- Full name: Matthew Villis
- Date of birth: 13 April 1984 (age 42)
- Place of birth: Bridgwater, England
- Position: Centre back

Team information
- Current team: Taunton Town

Youth career
- –2002: Bridgwater Town
- 2002–2003: Plymouth Argyle

Senior career*
Years	Team	Apps	(Gls)
2003–2005	Plymouth Argyle	0	(0)
2004–2005	→ Torquay United (loan)	22	(0)
2005–2007	Torquay United	18	(0)
2007–2010	Tiverton Town	85	(2)
2010–2013	Weston-super-Mare	101	(2)
2013–2014	Tiverton Town	24	(1)
2014–2015	Bideford		
2015	Yate Town		
2015–	Taunton Town	21	(1)
- * Club domestic league appearances and goals as of 19:03, 3 April 2013 (UTC)

Matthew Villis (born 13 April 1984) is an English footballer who played for Taunton Town as a centre back, having previously played for Bridgwater Town, Plymouth Argyle, Torquay United, Weston-Super-Mare, Tiverton Town, Bideford and Yate Town

== Career ==
Villis began his career as a junior with Bridgwater Town before signing as a trainee with Plymouth Argyle, turning professional in July 2003.

He then joined Torquay United on a season-long loan deal in July 2004, making his league debut as an early substitute for Lee Canoville in a 4–2 defeat at home to Sheffield Wednesday. He went on to play 22 times that season as Torquay unsuccessfully battled against relegation from Division Two.

He was released by Plymouth at the end of the season and joined Torquay on a free transfer in June 2005. Despite beginning the season as a regular squad member, he lost his place after Torquay's FA Cup draw against non-league Harrogate Town and was linked with a move to ambitious non-league side Truro City. He returned to the Torquay side in February 2006 as the Gulls battled against a second successive relegation and was a regular until the end of the season under first John Cornforth and then Ian Atkins.

He was confined to the substitute's bench for the early part of the 2006-07 season, although was restored to the first team under new manager Lubos Kubik before missing the remainder of the season due to injury. He was released in May 2007 after Torquay's relegation to the Conference National. He joined Bridgwater Town on trial in early July 2007 and was again linked with Truro City before joining Southern League side Tiverton Town later the same month.

In the summer of 2010, Villis signed for Conference South side Weston-super-Mare. As of April 2012, Villis had scored three goals in 103 appearances for the Seagulls.

In the summer of 2013, Villis rejoined Tiverton Town. In July 2018, Villis was appointed as first team coach at Taunton Town.

== Statistics ==
Appearances and goals by club, season and competition
Club	Season	League			FA Cup		League Cup		Other		Total	
Club	Season	Division	Apps	Goals	Apps	Goals	Apps	Goals	Apps	Goals	Apps	Goals
Plymouth Argyle	2003–04	Second Division	0	0	0	0	0	0	0	0	0	0
Torquay United	2004–05	League One	22	0	0	0	0	0	2	0	24	0
Torquay United	2005–06	League Two	12	0	1	0	1	0	0	0	14	0
Torquay United	2006–07	League Two	6	0	1	0	0	0	0	0	7	0
Torquay United	Total		40	0	2	0	1	0	2	0	45	0
Tiverton Town	2007–08	Southern Premier Division	41	1	1	0	—		4	0	46	1
Tiverton Town	2008–09	Southern Premier Division	32	1	0	0	—		0	0	32	1
Tiverton Town	2009–10	Southern Premier Division	12	0	0	0	—		0	0	12	0
Tiverton Town	Total		85	2	1	0	0	0	4	0	90	2
Weston-super-Mare	2010–11	Conference South	33	0	0	0	—		0	0	33	0
Weston-super-Mare	2011–12	Conference South	38	1	3	1	—		4	1	45	3
Weston-super-Mare	2012–13	Conference South	30	1	0	0	—		0	0	30	1
Weston-super-Mare	Total		101	2	3	1	0	0	4	1	108	4
Career total			226	4	6	1	1	0	10	1	243	6
