= Tiverton Town F.C. =

English football club

Coordinates: 50°54′33″N 3°29′25″W

Tiverton Town
- Full name: Tiverton Town Football Club
- Nicknames: "Tivvy", "The Yellows"
- Founded: 1913 (as Tiverton Athletic)
- Ground: The Slee Blackwell Solicitors Stadium/Ladysmead, Tiverton
- Capacity: 3,500 (520 seated)
- Chairman: Mark Farrell
- Manager: Asa Hall
- League: Southern League Division One South
- 2025–26: Southern League Premier Division South, 22nd of 22 (relegated)
- Website: www.tivertontownfc.uk
Home colours	Away colours

Tiverton Town Football Club are an English football club based in Tiverton, Devon. The club are currently members of the Southern League Division One South and play at The Slee Blackwell Solicitors Stadium, previously known as Ladysmead.

== History ==
The club was established in 1913 as Tiverton Athletic, and initially played at the Athletic Ground. They joined the East Devon League, winning the Senior Division in 1924–25, 1925–26, 1926–27, and 1927–28. They then joined the North Devon League, winning it in 1931–32, after which they transferred to the Exeter & District League, which they won in 1933–34.

In 1951–52, the club won the league's Senior Division, and, in 1956, won the Devon Senior Cup for the first time. They won the league again in 1964–65 and 1965–66, a season in which they also won the Senior Cup for a second time.

In 1973, the club joined the Western League. They were relegated to Division One at the end of the 1980–81 season after finishing bottom of the league. After finishing as runners-up in 1988–89, they were promoted back to the Premier Division. Following two fourth-placed finishes, the club finished third in 1991–92, second in 1992–93 (a season in which they also won the League Cup for the first time), and won the league and League Cup double in 1993–94. They won the league again the following season, and after finishing as runners-up in 1995–96, a season in which they also picked up the League Cup, achieved back-to-back titles again in 1996–97 (a double season) and 1997–98. They also won the FA Vase in 1998, beating Tow Law Town 1–0 in the final.

In 1998–99, the club won the FA Vase again, beating Bedlington Terriers 1–0, and finished second in the league, earning promotion to Division One West of the Southern League. In 2000–01, they finished second, and were promoted to the Premier Division, where they remained until 2011. In 2006–07, they won the Southern League Cup.

On 18 April 2012, it was announced in the national press that Tiverton had appointed 27-year-old internet entrepreneur Matthew Conridge as their new chairman. Believed to be one of the youngest football chairman in the UK ever, Conridge was quoted as saying, "I'm not here to chuck thousands of pounds into a black hole, I'm here to pull everyone together and work with a good team.... This club will not spend more than it can afford to chase a dream.... If we can't afford a budget to go to Blue Square Bet South we won't pay it." On 30 April 2013, the club released a press release as follows "Tiverton Town can confirm that Matthew Conridge has stepped down as Chairman of Tiverton Town to pursue other business interests. The club would like to place on record its gratitude for all his hard work whilst in the position. Former Tivvy chairman Dave Wright is taking over the position of chairman for the time being. The club also wishes to confirm the departure of interim manager Jamie Ward together with his assistant Paul Short."

In May 2013, Tiverton Town announced the arrival of John Clarkson as their new manager: "John Clarkson was tonight introduced to the media and Tivvy fans at a press conference at Ladysmead. Clarkson has arrived from Spain where he was manager of Ontinyent in Segunda B. He had been managing in Spain for the last six years". In May 2014, Clarkson stepped down from the position following the team's disappointing 2–0 Devon Bowl Final defeat to Plymouth Parkway who were playing in the league below Tiverton. He had led the side to the play-off's, where they lost to 9-man Paulton, and two Cup finals, but cited the last couple of months as the reason he was going, "The last couple of months have really taken it out of me, three or four games a week was just too much" He added, "I'm off to take my coaching badges during the summer and once I've completed them, I will decide on what I'm going to do." Despite a much higher wage budget than other teams in the league (thanks to John Clarkson's financial input), the club could not reach its aim of promotion in its centenary season. At the end of the season, many of the club's higher profile players left following John Clarkson's resignation and the reduction of the wage budget. Yellows legend Martyn Rogers was named as Clarkson's replacement and given the task of rebuilding the squad on a much more restricted wage budget.

In the 2016/17 season, Tiverton Town gained promotion to the Southern League Premier Division. They beat Salisbury 0–2 with goals from Michael Landricombe and Tom Bath in the playoff final in front of over 2,000, returning them to the Southern League Premier after being relegated in 2011.

In the 2017/18 season, Tivvy finished in a highly respectable position of 6th, especially considering the low budget and crowds compared to the top five and most of the league. Tivvy managed to beat four of the top five, though their playoff hopes ended because of poor away form.

At the end of the 2022/23 season, long standing Benefactor and chairman, Ian Moorcroft, announced he was departing the club to spend more time with his family. The club sought out a new chairman and landed on former Plymouth Argyle CEO, Michael Dunford.

The 2023/24 season started with promise with a new committee and a rebuilt squad for the new season. Hope was in the air for Tiverton Town Fans. However, the season was bleak from the outset and the longest serving manager in the clubs history, Martyn Rogers, was sacked after a string of mediocre results. And former Taunton Town Manager, Leigh Robinson, was appointed as the new manager.

However, shortly after this the new chairman, Michael Dunford, decided to call time on his spell as chairman. His tenure at the club was short and tumultuous. He was replaced with at the end of November 2023. Ian Moorcroft Became Chairman again before the home game with Hungerford Town on 2 December 2023

== Stadium ==
The club currently play at The Slee Blackwell Solicitors Stadium, Ladysmead, Bolham Road, Tiverton, Devon, EX16 6SG.

Opened in 1946, the ground has a capacity of 3,500, of which 520 is seated.

As Tiverton Athletic, the club played its home games at the Athletic Ground, now known as Amory Park. The ground boasted a huge wooden pavilion with a seated veranda, which was quite extravagant for a non-league club in the 1910s. In 1921, Athletic were effectively evicted from their ground and moved to a local rugby pitch, Elm Field (aka "The Elms"), with the reformed rugby club taking their place at their old ground. The Elms housed a wooden 150-seat stand on one side, with grass banks behind the goals being the only other spectator zones.

The Elms was virtually destroyed during World War II, meaning the club had to move, eventually relocating to Ladysmead. The club's record attendance of 3,000 came in the FA Cup first round, against Leyton Orient on 12 November 1994. After falling behind 1-0, Leyton Orient equalised. During the celebrations by the fans, part of what appeared to be a freshly built wall collapsed and led to a lengthy delay.

== Players ==
As of 31st August 2026.

=== Current squad ===
Note: Flags indicate national team as defined under FIFA eligibility rules; some limited exceptions apply. Players may hold more than one non-FIFA nationality.

No.	Pos.	Nation	Player
1	GK	ENG	Louis Smith
2	DF	ENG	Mason Winter
3	DF	ENG	Corey Koerner
4	DF	ENG	Louie Slough
5	DF	ENG	Matt Wood
6	DF	ENG	Ed Palmer (Captain)
21	MF	ENG	Aaron Wellington
8	MF	ENG	Asa Hall (Player/Manager)
9	FW	ENG	Owen Howe
10	FW	ENG	Louis Jagger-Cane
11	FW	ENG	Jacob Wellington

No.	Pos.	Nation	Player
14	MF	ENG	Jack Kennell
31	MF	ENG	Billy Tucker
-	MF	ENG	Caleb Pryce-Hall (On Loan (Corsham Town))
17	FW	ENG	Aidan Horne
18	MF	ENG	Cole Harford
12	MF	ENG	Finn Roberts
10	MF	ENG	Ryan Keates
—	DF	ENG	Lewis Flowers
—	DF	ENG	Finn Hodge (On Loan (Corsham Town))
—	FW	ENG	Karim Coulibaly

=== Dual Registered Players ===
Note: Flags indicate national team as defined under FIFA eligibility rules; some limited exceptions apply. Players may hold more than one non-FIFA nationality.

No.	Pos.	Nation	Player
—	MF	ENG	Joe Wylie (Dual Registered with Cullompton Town)

== Staff ==
=== Off-Pitch Staff ===
Position	Name
Chairman	Mark Farrell
Vice Chairman	Vacant
Committee Chairman & Welfare Officer	Ollie Priestley
Commercial Manager	Craig Bryce
Treasurer	Jon Lines
Club Secretary	Viv Curtis
Fixture Secretary	Anthony Dodd
Head of Media	Ryan Downer
Ground Safety Officer	Marian Pile
Groundsman	Stuart Antell

=== On-Pitch Staff ===
Position	Name
Director of Football	(England) Lee Lashenko
Head of Football Development	(England) Mike Ebdon
Men's Team Manager	(England) Asa Hall
Men's Team Coach	(England) Steven Orchard
Men's Team Coach	(England) David Steele
Women's Team Manager	(England) David Kelland
Women's Team Manager	(England) Amy Woodman
U18's Team Manager	(England) Richard Barrass
U18's Team Manager	(England) Stevie King
U18's Team Coach	(England) Jack Balchin
Physio	(England) Ellie Jones
Kitman	(England) William Buttle

== Honours ==
- FA Vase
  - Winners 1998, 1999
  - Runners-up 1993
- Southern League
  - South & West Division One Play-Off Winners 2016–17
  - League Cup winners 2007
- Western League
  - Champions 1993–94, 1994–95, 1996–97, 1997–98
  - League Cup winners 1992–93, 1993–94, 1995–96, 1996–97, 1997–98
  - Amateur Trophy Winners 1977–78, 1978–79
- Exeter & District League
  - Champions 1933–34, 1964–65, 1965–66
- North Devon League
  - Champions 1931–32
- East Devon League
  - Senior Division champions 1924–25, 1925–26, 1926–27, 1927–28
- East Devon Senior Cup
  - Winners 1929, 1936, 1938, 1953, 1961, 1963, 1967
- Devon Senior Cup
  - Winners 1956, 1966
- Devon St. Luke's Cup
  - Winners 1991, 1992, 1993, 1994, 1995, 1997, 2000, 2003, 2006, 2017

== Club records ==
- Highest League Position: 4th in Southern League premier Division 2002–03
- F.A Cup best Performance: First round 1990–91, 1991–92, 1994–95, 1997–98, 2001–02, 2002–03, 2004–05
- F.A Trophy best Performance: Fifth round 2000–01
- F.A. Vase best performance: Winners 1997–98, 1998–99
- League victory: 14–1 v University College SW, 11 February 1933
- League defeat: 0–10 v Dawlish Town, 27 December 1969
- Record attendance: 3,000 v Leyton Orient, 12 November 1994
- Top goalscorer: Phil Everett, 378

== Former players ==
1. Players that have played/managed more than 15 times in the football league or any foreign equivalent to this level (i.e. fully professional league).
2. Players with full international caps.
3. Players that hold a club record or have captained the club.

Alfie pond

- (England) Craig Alcock
- (Republic of Ireland) Kwame Ampadu
- (England) Alan Banks
- (England) Elliot Benyon
- (England) Steve Book
- (England) Simon Bryant
- (England) Paul Buckle
- (England) Sean Canham
- (England) Steve Collis
- (England) Matt Villis
- (England) Chris Curran
- (England) Steve Flack
- (England) Ben Foster
- (England) George Friend
- (England) Matthew Hewlett
- (England) Scott Hiley
- (England) Kevin Hill
- (Wales) Chris Holloway
- (England) Chris Vinnicombe
- (England) Ian Hutchinson
- (England) John Impey
- (England) Scott Laird
- (England) Ryan Leonard
- (England) Sam Malsom
- (England) Nicky Marker
- (England) Barry McConnell
- (Wales) Kurt Nogan
- (England) Phil Walsh
- (England) Mark Ovendale
- (England) Richard Pears
- (England) Graeme Power
- (England) Stephen Reed
- (Wales) Jason Rees
- (England) Nathan Rudge
- (England) Mark Saunders
- (England) Danny Seaborne
- (Singapore) John Wilkinson
- A list of Tiverton Players former and current can be found, including those that do not meet the criteria above here:Category:Tiverton Town F.C. players
