= Simon Bryant (footballer) =

English footballer

Personal information
- Full name: Simon Christopher Bryant
- Date of birth: 22 November 1982 (age 43)
- Place of birth: Bristol, England
- Height: 5 ft 9 in (1.75 m)
- Position: Midfielder

Team information
- Current team: Longwell Green

Youth career
- ?–1999: Bristol Rovers

Senior career*
| Years | Team | Apps | (Gls) |
| 1999–2004 | Bristol Rovers | 87 | (2) |
| 2003–2004 | → Tiverton Town (loan) | 6 | (0) |
| 2004–2005 | Forest Green Rovers | | |
| –2008 | Hanham Athletic | | |
| 2008 | Mangotsfield United | 0 | (0) |
| 2008–2009 | Cadbury Heath | 13 | (2) |
| 2009–2010 | Oldland Abbotonians | 12 | (1) |
| 2010– | Longwell Green | 10 | (1) |
- * Club domestic league appearances and goals as of 21:25, 16 October 2011 (UTC)

Simon Christopher Bryant (born 22 November 1982) is an English former professional footballer, who spent five years (1999–2004) in The Football League with Bristol Rovers.

Bryant began his career as a trainee with Bristol Rovers and after being promoted to the professional ranks at the club in 1999, he remained at the club as a player until 2004. During this spell he went on loan to Tiverton Town during the Christmas and new year period in 2003/2004.

He signed for Mangotsfield United in the summer of 2008, but left the club after less than a month, citing work commitments, without having played a single competitive match. He joined Cadbury Heath in August that year. He moved to Oldland Abbotonians a year later, where he made 12 league appearances, scoring once, during the 2009–10 season.
