= Micky Evans =

English footballer

Personal information
- Birth name: Michael Evans
- Date of birth: 3 August 1946 (age 80)
- Place of birth: West Bromwich, England
- Height: 6 ft 0 in (1.83 m)
- Position: Full back

Senior career*
Years	Team	Apps	(Gls)
- Vono Sports
1963–1972	Walsall	231	(7)
1972–1975	Swansea City	92	(6)
1975–1977	Crewe Alexandra	62	(4)
1977–197x	Worcester City		(1)
–	Stourbridge		
–	Stafford Rangers		
–	Halesowen Town		
–	Rushall Olympic		
- * Club domestic league appearances and goals

Michael Evans (born 3 August 1946) is an English former footballer who played as a full back in the Football League for Walsall, Swansea City and Crewe Alexandra. He then played for a number of non-league clubs including Worcester City, Stourbridge, Stafford Rangers, Halesowen Town and Rushall Olympic, and has scouted for various Midlands clubs.
