= Tom Ramasut =

Welsh footballer and manager

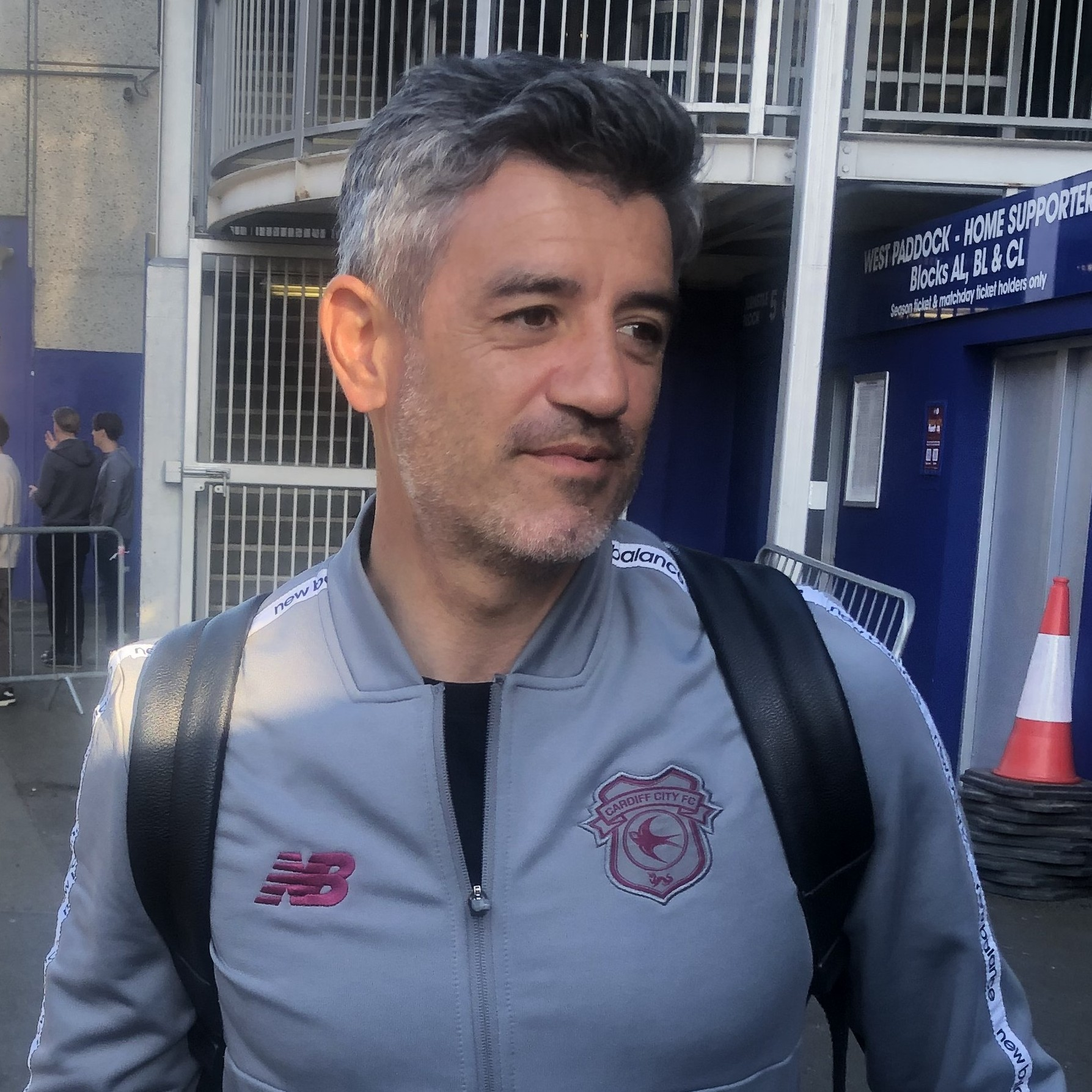
- Tom Ramasut in 2025.

Personal information
- Full name: Mahan William Thomas Ramasut
- Date of birth: 30 August 1977 (age 49)
- Place of birth: Cardiff, Wales
- Height: 1.78 m (5 ft 10 in)
- Position: Midfielder

Team information
- Current team: Bristol Rovers (interim academy head of coaching)

Senior career*
Years	Team	Apps	(Gls)
1995–1996	Norwich City	0	(0)
1996–1998	Bristol Rovers	42	(6)
1995–1996	Merthyr Tydfil		
1996–1998	Llanelli	8	(1)
1998–1999	Haverfordwest County	31	(5)
1999–2000	Merthyr Tydfil		
2000–2001	Barry Town	52	(13)
2001–2002	Carmarthen Town	1	(0)
2003	Bath City		
2003	Aylesbury United		
2006–2007	Carmarthen Town	30	(1)
2007–2009	Haverfordwest County	40	(3)
2009–2010	Aberaman Athletic		
2010–2011	Haverfordwest County	17	(2)
Total		221	(31)

International career
1996–98	Wales U21	4	(0)

Managerial career
- 2014–2016: Cambrian & Clydach Vale
- 2021–2025: Cardiff City (assistant)
- * Club domestic league appearances and goals as of 07:17, 21 July 2010 (UTC)

Mahan William Thomas Ramasut (born 30 August 1977) is a Welsh football manager and former player. He is currently interim academy head of coaching at Bristol Rovers.

== Career ==
Born in Cardiff, he began his playing career at Norwich City, and although he made regular appearances in the reserve team he was released before making his first team debut. He signed for Bristol Rovers on 12 September 1996 and went on to make 42 league appearances for the club, and was released in the summer of 1998 after failing to agree terms on a new contract. After unsuccessful trials at Walsall and Cardiff City he moved to Merthyr Tydfil in the Southern League for the 1998–99 season.

Tom moved to League of Wales team Llanelli during the 1999–2000 season, and the following year he joined Haverfordwest County, also in the League of Wales. He briefly re-joined Merthyr at the start of the 2001–02 season, before being released in November 2001, and then signed for Barry Town. He remained at Barry until the beginning of the 2003–04 season, when financial problems lead to the team releasing its entire first-team squad.

His next move was due to be to Southern League team Bath City, but because the move from Wales to England counts as an international transfer under FIFA rules there was a delay while he waited for the international transfer window to open. During this time he temporarily signed for Carmarthen Town, before finally being able to move to Bath in September 2003. Two months later, in November 2003, he moved to Aylesbury United who were playing in the Ryman League at the time. In January 2004 he had an unsuccessful trial with Queens Park Rangers and was later released by Aylesbury. Later he returned to Wales and joined Carmarthen Town for a second spell at the club.

He spent two years with Haverfordwest County before joining Aberaman Athletic in May 2009. However, he returned to Haverfordwest just seven months later.

== Coaching career ==
Ramasut moved into coaching in 2011 when he began coaching at Cardiff City's academy, taking on a number of roles in the academy including head of coaching. He also spent time with Bridgend Town and Cambrian & Clydach. Ramasut took over the role as under 23s manager for a short period following the departure of manager Andy Legg before becoming assistant to incoming boss Steve Morison. Ramasut was promoted from the under 23s to the senior position as he and Morison became co-managers following the departure of Mick McCarthy, the duo lead the Bluebirds to 4 points from 3 games. Following this run Steve Morison was appointed as first team manager with Ramasut his assistant

In March 2026, Ramasut joined the coaching staff of Cymru Premier club Cardiff Met.

In the summer of 2026, Ramasut returned to former club Bristol Rovers as Interim Head of Coaching with the club's academy.

== Non-football interests ==
Ramasut is a fluent Welsh speaker who was a co-founder of the popular Cardiff music venue Gwdihw until its controversial close in 2018, the venue had hosted both up and coming and established acts such as Catfish and the Bottlemen and Gruff Rhys. He was also a director at Cardiff music venue 10 Feet Tall
