= Graeme Power (footballer, born 1977) =

English footballer

Personal information
- Full name: Graeme Power
- Date of birth: 7 March 1977 (age 49)
- Place of birth: London Borough of Harrow, England
- Height: 6 ft 0 in (1.83 m)
- Position: Defender

Senior career*
Years	Team	Apps	(Gls)
1995–1996	Queens Park Rangers	0	(0)
1996–1998	Bristol Rovers	26	(0)
1998–2003	Exeter City	171	(2)
2003–2004	Tiverton Town	19	(0)
2004	Weymouth	?	(0)
2006–2009	Truro City	75	(1)
- * Club domestic league appearances and goals

Graeme Power is an English former professional footballer who played as a defender.

Power began his career with Queens Park Rangers in 1995, but made no first team appearances. After two years at Bristol Rovers, he moved to Exeter City in 1998 and made 192 appearances for the Grecians in all competitions.

Whilst still involved at Exeter on a coaching basis, Power moved to Truro City in the summer of 2006, where he played for three full seasons, winning the FA Vase at Wembley Stadium in 2007 before leaving in late December 2009.

He is now a teacher at Paignton Academy.
