= Mike Trought =

English footballer

Personal information
- Full name: Michael John Trought
- Date of birth: 19 October 1980 (age 46)
- Place of birth: Bristol, England
- Position: Defender

Team information
- Current team: Mangotsfield United

Senior career*
Years	Team	Apps	(Gls)
1998–2002	Bristol Rovers	33	(0)
2000	→ Clevedon Town (loan)		
2002–2005	Bath City		
2005	Backwell United		
2005–?	Clevedon Town		
- Paulton Rovers
2009–	Mangotsfield United	6	(0)

Managerial career
- 2000–?: Bedminster Down – Cross Hands
- * Club domestic league appearances and goals as of 20:25, 31 March 2010 (UTC)

Michael John Trought (born on 19 October 1980) is a former English professional footballer who played in The Football League for Bristol Rovers and currently plays for Southern League team Mangotsfield United.

== Biography ==
Trought was born in Bristol and began his career as a trainee with Bristol Rovers, joining their professional squad in 1998. He made 33 League appearances in four years with the club The Pirates, before joining Bath City in 2002. While with Rovers, he was loaned to Clevedon Town in 2000.

== Career ==
In three seasons with Bath City, he played 81 times in all competitions, scoring once, but his time there was often interrupted by minor injuries. He subsequently spent time with Backwell United, Clevedon Town, and Paulton Rovers, before taking a brief break from football. He returned to the sport in August 2009, joining Mangotsfield United.

== Management ==
Early in his career, Trought gained some management experience as manager of Sunday league side Bedminster Down–Cross Hands F.C. in 2000, earning promotion in each of his first two seasons with the club.
