= David Pritchard (footballer) =

English footballer

Personal information
- Date of birth: 27 May 1972 (age 54)
- Place of birth: Wolverhampton, England
- Position: Defender

Senior career*
Years	Team	Apps	(Gls)
1990–1992	West Bromwich Albion	5	(0)
1992–1994	Telford United		
1994–2002	Bristol Rovers	163	(1)

International career
	Wales B	1	(0)
- * Club domestic league appearances and goals

David Pritchard (born 27 May 1972) is an English former professional footballer, who played for West Bromwich Albion, Telford United and Bristol Rovers.

Pritchard began his career at West Brom, before moving on to Telford United. He moved to Bristol Rovers in 1994, making 163 appearances for the club and scoring just one goal. He was forced to retire from the game due to a knee injury in 2002.
