= Billy Clark (footballer, born 1967) =

English footballer and coach

Personal information
- Full name: William Raymond Clark
- Date of birth: 19 May 1967 (age 59)
- Place of birth: Christchurch, England
- Height: 5 ft 11 in (1.80 m)
- Position: Defender

Senior career*
| Years | Team | Apps | (Gls) |
| 1984–1987 | AFC Bournemouth | 4 | (0) |
| 1987–1997 | Bristol Rovers | 248 | (14) |
| 1991 | →Bath City (loan) | 3 | (0) |
| 1997 | → Cheltenham Town (loan) | | |
| 1997–1999 | Exeter City | 41 | (3) |
| 1999–2001 | Forest Green Rovers | 75 | (6) |
| 2001–2003 | Newport County | | |
| 2003–2005 | Weston-super-Mare | | |
| 2005–2007 | Clevedon Town | | |
| 2007 | Weston-super-Mare | 10 | (0) |
- * Club domestic league appearances and goals

William Raymond Clark (born 19 May 1967) is a former professional footballer and a current youth team coach with Bath City.

Clark was born in Christchurch, Hampshire on the south coast of England and began his footballing career as a trainee with AFC Bournemouth. Most of his career was spent with Bristol Rovers, where he spent ten years and made 289 appearances for the club in all competitions, scoring fifteen goals.

Later, Clark rejoined Weston-super-Mare for his second stint with the club. He captained The Seagulls from 2003 to 2005 before moving to rivals Clevedon Town. His role with Weston was a coach/player which he played defense as well as being used in a coaching capacity.

Clark subsequently retired from professional football. He was a youth coach with Bristol Rovers before moving on to perform the same role with Bath City FC in 2009.
