= Julian Alsop =

English footballer

Personal information
- Full name: Julian Mark Alsop
- Date of birth: 28 May 1973 (age 53)
- Place of birth: Nuneaton, England
- Height: 6 ft 4 in (1.93 m)
- Position: Striker

Senior career*
Years	Team	Apps	(Gls)
1990–1992	Nuneaton Borough		
1992–1995	VS Rugby		
1995–1996	Racing Club Warwick		
1996	Tamworth		
1996–1997	Halesowen Town	22	(12)
1997–1998	Bristol Rovers	35	(4)
1998	→ Swansea City (loan)	5	(2)
1998–2000	Swansea City	89	(14)
2000–2003	Cheltenham Town	120	(36)
2003–2004	Oxford United	34	(5)
2004	Northampton Town	7	(1)
2004–2005	Forest Green Rovers	3	(1)
2005–2006	Tamworth	9	(1)
2005–2006	→ Forest Green Rovers (loan)	9	(2)
2006	Forest Green Rovers	14	(3)
2006–2008	Newport County		
2008	Cirencester Town		
2008–2009	Bishop's Cleeve		
2009–2010	Cheltenham Town	41	(4)
2010–2011	Bishop's Cleeve	34	(8)
2012–2013	Carmarthen Town	12	(0)
2014	Monmouth Town		
- * Club domestic league appearances and goals

Julian Mark Alsop (born 28 May 1973) is an English former professional footballer.

== Career ==
A tall, strong striker, Alsop first came to prominence with Bristol Rovers before joining Swansea City in 1998 for £30,000 immediately following a loan deal.

He signed for Cheltenham Town from Swansea and was less than prolific in his first season, but his second year with the club proved to be a revelation. His partnership with Tony Naylor led to Alsop scoring 26 goals, including the second goal as Cheltenham beat Rushden and Diamonds 3–1 in the Division Three play-off final. His third and final season with the club was beset by injuries and he left Cheltenham for Oxford United at the end of 2002–4 |Oxford United]], Alsop signed for Northampton Town during the 2004–2005 season.

When the season was over he signed for Conference National side Forest Green Rovers. After a brief spell at fellow Conference team Tamworth he returned to Forest Green Rovers.

He signed for Conference South team Newport County in July 2006 after being released from his contract at Forest Green. During his time at Newport they twice narrowly missed out on the promotion play-offs and twice appeared in the FAW Premier Cup final, winning the 2008 final. Alsop was released by Newport at the end of the 2007–08 season.

Other clubs include Halesowen and Northampton Town.

Alsop signed for Cirencester Town after being released from Newport County on a free transfer but left the side after several months to sign for Bishops Cleeve.

On 20 July 2009, Alsop made a surprise return to the Football League and signed a non-contract, month-by month agreement with Cheltenham Town, after playing in the first three pre-season friendlies for the club.

He came off the bench on 18 August away at Rochdale to score a 90th minute winning goal in a 1–0 victory for Cheltenham Town.

We went shopping for a big strong centre-forward at the start of the season, but couldn't afford the players we wanted. If you go shopping at Sainsbury's and ask for a fillet steak but can't afford it, you have to find something else and we've ended up with a gristly old fatty lump of lard up front – but it tasted good.

— Manager Martin Allen explains Alsop's return to Cheltenham.

He was released by the club along with seven other players in May 2010. In July 2010, he returned to Bishop's Cleeve. Alsop announced that he was set to retire from football on 25 April 2011. He had made 34 league appearances during his second spell at Bishop's Cleeve, scoring eight goals.

In January 2012 he came out of retirement to play for Welsh club Carmarthen Town. He made his début for Carmarthen Town as a second-half substitute in a 2–1 win over Aberystwyth Town on 2 January, and remained with the club until December 2012, making twelve league appearances in total.

In January 2014, Alsop joined Welsh League outfit Monmouth Town.

== Honours ==
Swansea City

- Football League Third Division: 1999–2000

Cheltenham Town

- Football League Third Division play-offs: 2002
