= Matt Hayfield =

English footballer (born 1975)

Personal information
- Full name: Matthew Hayfield
- Date of birth: 8 August 1975 (age 51)
- Place of birth: Bristol, England
- Position: Midfielder

Senior career*
Years	Team	Apps	(Gls)
1994–1998	Bristol Rovers	44	(0)
1997	→ Yeovil Town (loan)	5	(1)
1998	Shrewsbury Town	2	(0)
1998–2000	Yeovil Town	39	(9)
2000–2001	Woking	45	(4)
2001–2002	Basingstoke Town	22	(2)
Total		157	(16)
- * Club domestic league appearances and goals

Matthew Hayfield (born 8 August 1975) is a former professional footballer, who played as a midfielder in The Football League for Bristol Rovers and Shrewsbury Town. He also played non-League football for Yeovil Town, Woking and Basingstoke Town.

Hayfield began his career as an apprentice at Bristol Rovers, where he was promoted to the professional squad in 1994. He went on to make 44 League appearances for The Pirates, and also played in a further ten cup matches, all without scoring. He was loaned out to Football Conference team Yeovil Town early in the 1997–98 season, where he played five league games and scored once.

On his release from Bristol Rovers in 1998, Hayfield joined Shrewsbury Town on a short-term deal, where he played in just two League games, before returning to Yeovil. In his second spell with the Somerset club he played 39 times in the Conference, and scored nine goals, before leaving them in 2000. He spent just over a season with Woking, where he played in 45 league games, followed by a year-long spell with Basingstoke Town, for whom he played 22 times in the Isthmian League before being released in May 2002.
