= Steve Parmenter =

English footballer (born 1977)

Personal information
- Full name: Steven James Parmenter
- Date of birth: 22 January 1977 (age 49)
- Place of birth: Chelmsford, England
- Height: 5 ft 9 in (1.75 m)
- Positions: Midfielder; forward

Youth career
- 1993–1995: Southend United

Senior career*
Years	Team	Apps	(Gls)
1995–1996	Queens Park Rangers	0	(0)
1996–1998	Bristol Rovers	18	(2)
1997	→ Yeovil Town (loan)		
1998	Yeovil Town		
1998	Dorchester Town		
1998	Kingstonian		
1998–2004	Canvey Island		
2004-2005	Wivenhoe Town	2	(0)
2004–2005	Bishop's Stortford		
2005	Cambridge City		
2005–?	Braintree Town		
2006-2006	Wivenhoe Town	38	(3)

International career
	Wales Under-21	2	(0)
- * Club domestic league appearances and goals

Steven James Parmenter (born 22 January 1977) is an English former professional footballer who played in the Football League for Bristol Rovers.

Parmenter played schoolboy football with Cambridge United and Ipswich Town before spending two years in the Southend United youth system. He was signed by Queens Park Rangers in 1995 and won a Football Combination league title with their reserve team, but never made an appearance for the first eleven. He signed for Bristol Rovers in the summer of 1996 and made his senior debut as a substitute against Stockport County on 31 August, in a game which also marked Rovers' first match back in Bristol after ten years of playing their home matches in Bath.

After his spell in Bristol ended in 1998, Parmenter played for a number of non-league clubs, most notably for Canvey Island where he spent six years and earned an FA Trophy-winner's medal in 2001.

Following his footballing career, he trained as a match official and as of 2020 was working as an assistant referee, officiating in Premier League 2, National League, and FA Women's Super League matches. Since 2015 he has been an officer in the Metropolitan Police.
