= Lee Zabek =

English footballer

Personal information
- Full name: Lee Kevin Zabek
- Date of birth: 13 October 1978 (age 48)
- Place of birth: Bristol, England
- Position: Midfielder

Youth career
- ?–1996: Bristol Rovers

Senior career*
Years	Team	Apps	(Gls)
1996–2000	Bristol Rovers	29	(1)
2000–2002	Exeter City	33	(0)
2002–2004	Clevedon Town		
2004–?	Keynsham Town		
2007–2009	Nicholas Wanderers		
- * Club domestic league appearances and goals

Lee Kevin Zabek (born 13 October 1978) is a former professional footballer, who played in The Football League for Bristol Rovers and Exeter City.

Bristol-born Zabek started out as a trainee with his home town team, Bristol Rovers, and graduated through to their professional ranks in the summer of 1996. He went on to make 29 League appearances for The Pirates, scoring once, before being released in 2000. He then spent two years with Exeter City, playing 33 times in the League for them without finding the back of the net.

After leaving Exeter in 2002, Zabek dropped down to non-League football, firstly with Clevedon Town, with whom he spent two years, and then with Keynsham Town in 2004. Following his spell with Keynsham he dropped even further down the football pyramid, playing for Bristol Premier Combination side Nicholas Wanderers with Lee Rose (UTW) between 2007 and 2009, as well as turning out for a number of Sunday league teams.
