= Tom White (footballer, born 1976) =

English footballer

Personal information
- Full name: Thomas White
- Date of birth: 26 January 1976 (age 50)
- Place of birth: Bristol, England
- Position: Defender

Youth career
- Bristol Rovers

Senior career*
Years	Team	Apps	(Gls)
1994–2000	Bristol Rovers	54	(1)
2000	→ Hereford United (loan)	16	(0)
2000–2003	Yeovil Town	67	(1)
2003	→ Woking (loan)	2	(0)
- * Club domestic league appearances and goals as of 19:25, 4 October 2010 (UTC)

Tom White (born 26 January 1976 in Bristol) is an English footballer, he plays as a defender.

Tom started his career as a trainee at Bristol Rovers, later moving on loan to Hereford United, before signing permanently for Yeovil Town. While at Yeovil he won the FA Trophy in 2002, and won promotion from the Football Conference in 2003 before being loaned to Woking. The end of his Yeovil career was ruined by knee injuries and was released at the end of the 2002–03 season.

In November 2001, Tom and his girlfriend Louis lost their daughter Olivia to a brain tumour after a yearlong battle.
