= Andy Tillson =

English footballer (born 1966)

Personal information
- Full name: Andrew Tillson
- Date of birth: 30 June 1966 (age 60)
- Place of birth: Huntingdon, England
- Height: 6 ft 2 in (1.88 m)
- Position: Defender

Senior career*
Years	Team	Apps	(Gls)
1987–1988	Kettering Town	37	(3)
1988–1990	Grimsby Town	106	(5)
1990–1992	Queen Park Rangers	29	(2)
1992	→ Grimsby Town (loan)	4	(0)
1992–2000	Bristol Rovers	252	(11)
2000–2002	Walsall	51	(2)
2002–2003	Rushden & Diamonds	19	(0)
Total		498	(23)
- * Club domestic league appearances and goals

Andy Tillson (born 30 June 1966) is an English football coach and former player who was head coach at Team Bath. Following Team Bath's decision to disband at the end of the 2008–09 season, Tillson was initially appointed as Weymouth's assistant manager, but on 15 June 2009 it was announced that he would instead join Exeter City as First Team Coach under manager Paul Tisdale.

He was signed for Queens Park Rangers by Don Howe in 1990 from Grimsby Town along with Darren Peacock to cover a major injury crisis at Loftus Road and made his debut in the 1–1 draw with Derby County.

He was a central defender and his chances were limited once Alan McDonald, Danny Maddix and Paul Parker returned from injury. He made just 29 appearances for QPR scoring 2 goals before being signed by Bristol Rovers for a club record fee of £370,000 in 1992. He became the club captain of Bristol Rovers and made over 250 league appearances for the club before joining Walsall and then Rushden & Diamonds.

== Honours ==
Walsall

- Football League Second Division play-offs: 2001

Individual

- PFA Team of the Year: 2000–01 Second Division
