= Frankie Bennett =

English footballer

Personal information
- Full name: Frank Bennett
- Date of birth: 3 January 1969 (age 57)
- Place of birth: Birmingham, England
- Height: 5 ft 11 in (1.80 m)
- Position: Forward

Senior career*
Years	Team	Apps	(Gls)
1992–1993	Halesowen Town		
1993–1996	Southampton	19	(1)
1996	→ Shrewsbury Town (loan)	4	(3)
1996–2000	Bristol Rovers	44	(4)
2000	Exeter City	9	(1)
2000–2001	Forest Green Rovers	27	(2)
2001	Aberystwyth Town		
2001–2002	Weston-super-Mare		
2002–2004	Bath City		
2004–??	Brislington		
- * Club domestic league appearances and goals

Frank Bennett (born 3 January 1969) is an English former professional football forward.

Bennett played for Halesowen Town before joining Southampton in February 1993 for an initial fee of £10,000. He played 19 times, mainly as a substitute, and scored once against Chelsea, before joining Shrewsbury Town on loan in October 1996 and moved to Bristol Rovers the following month for a fee of £3,000.

He joined Exeter City on non-contract terms in February 2000, but left to join Forest Green Rovers the following month. He was a part of the Forest Green side that reached the 2001 FA Trophy final after he scored in a 4-1 semi final win over Hereford United at Edgar Street.

He moved to Aberystwyth Town and then followed manager Frank Gregan to Weston-super-Mare. He joined Bath City in June 2002. He struggled with injury and turned down a reduced deal in May 2004, joining Brislington in August 2004.

Bennett has a wife named Michelle, a son, Joshua, and a daughter, Shanee.
