= Lee Archer (footballer) =

English footballer

Personal information
- Full name: Lee Archer
- Date of birth: 6 November 1972 (age 53)
- Place of birth: Bristol, England
- Position: Midfielder

Senior career*
Years	Team	Apps	(Gls)
1991–1998	Bristol Rovers	126	(19)
1997–1998	→ Yeovil Town (loan)	6	(7)
1998–1999	Rushden & Diamonds	1	(0)
1999–2000	Yeovil Town	4	(0)
2010	Gloucester City	3	(0)
- * Club domestic league appearances and goals

Lee Archer (born 6 November 1972) is an English former professional footballer who played as a midfielder.

Archer was born in Bristol, and began his career as a trainee at his home town club Bristol Rovers. He made 200 appearances for Rovers in all competitions. He was known as a quick left winger or left sided midfielder and was part of a Bristol Rovers side that lost out to Huddersfield at Wembley in the playoff final. Having to give up professional football due to knee injuries he then had a spell at Yeovil Town before moving on to Rushden & Diamonds. He then moved back for a second spell at Yeovil Town. He is now owner of Pro Fitness personal training.

After a long break from the game Lee made a surprise comeback at the age of 37 in August 2010 when he was tempted back by former Bristol Rovers teammate David Mehew to play for Gloucester City as cover for the injured Jake Harris. The Tigers were going through something of an injury crisis and manager Mehew called up his old friend in an effort to patch over some of the gaps in his squad. Although he hadn't played a competitive match at any level for over seven years he impressed on his Gloucester debut; a 5–0 win over Redditch United.
